= Laverrière (disambiguation) =

Laverrière is a commune in Oise department, France.

Laverrière or La Verrière may also refer to:

- Alphonse Laverrière, Swiss architect
- La Verrière, a commune in Yvelines department, Île-de-France, France
  - La Verrière station
