= La Neuville-sur-Oudeuil =

- Commune
- Location of La Neuville-sur-Oudeuil
- Location within France Location within Hauts-de-France
- Coordinates: 49°34′27″N 2°00′28″E
- Country: France
- Region: Hauts-de-France
- Department: Oise
- Arrondissement: Beauvais
- Canton: Grandvilliers
- Intercommunality: Picardie Verte

Government
  - Mayor (2020–2026): Christine Ortegat
- Area^{1}: 3.7 km^{2} (1.4 sq mi)
- Elevation: 175 m (574 ft)
- Highest elevation: 187 m (614 ft)
- Lowest elevation: 148 m (486 ft)
- Population (2023): 301
  - Density: 81/km^{2} (210/sq mi)
- Time zone: UTC+01:00 (CET)
  - Summer (DST): UTC+02:00 (CEST)
- INSEE/Postal code: 60458 /60690
- ^{1} French Land Register data, which excludes lakes, ponds, glaciers > 1 km^{2} (0.386 sq mi or 247 acres) and river estuaries.

La Neuville-sur-Oudeuil (French pronunciation: [la nøvil syʁ udœj], literally La Neuville on Oudeuil) is a commune in the Oise department in northern France.

== See also ==
- Communes of the Oise department
