= Halloy =

Halloy may refer to:

- Jean Baptiste Julien d'Omalius d'Halloy (1783–1875), Belgian geologist
- Halloy, Oise, a French commune
- Halloy, Pas-de-Calais, a French commune
- Château de Halloy, a castle in Halloy, Belgium
- Halloy, Belgium, a village in Belgium

== See also ==
- Halloy-lès-Pernois, Somme, a French commune
