= Briot, Oise =

Briot
- Commune
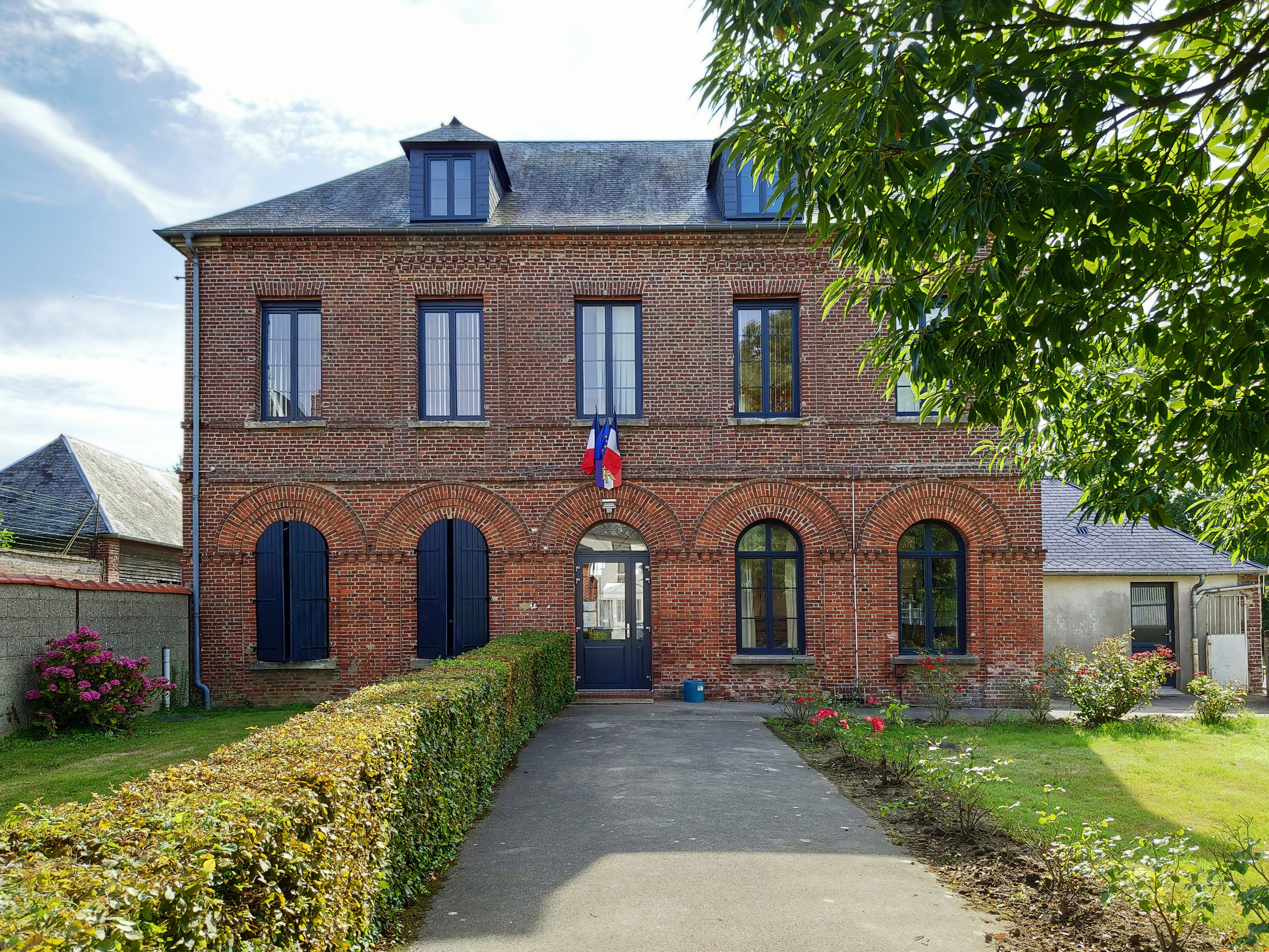
- Town hall
- Location of Briot
- Location within France Location within Hauts-de-France
- Coordinates: 49°39′02″N 1°55′29″E
- Country: France
- Region: Hauts-de-France
- Department: Oise
- Arrondissement: Beauvais
- Canton: Grandvilliers
- Intercommunality: Picardie Verte

Government
  - Mayor (2020–2026): Franck Cordier
- Area^{1}: 6.49 km^{2} (2.51 sq mi)
- Elevation: 190 m (620 ft)
- Highest elevation: 204 m (669 ft)
- Lowest elevation: 158 m (518 ft)
- Population (2023): 302
  - Density: 46.5/km^{2} (121/sq mi)
- Time zone: UTC+01:00 (CET)
  - Summer (DST): UTC+02:00 (CEST)
- INSEE/Postal code: 60108 /60210
- ^{1} French Land Register data, which excludes lakes, ponds, glaciers > 1 km^{2} (0.386 sq mi or 247 acres) and river estuaries.

Briot (French pronunciation: [bʁijo]) is a commune in the Oise department in northern France.

== Population ==
Historical population
Year	Pop.	±% p.a.
1968	288	—
1975	269	−0.97%
1982	258	−0.59%
1990	265	+0.34%
1999	262	−0.13%
2007	301	+1.75%
2012	288	−0.88%
2017	283	−0.35%
2023	302	+1.09%
Source: INSEE

== See also ==
- Communes of the Oise department
