= Lavacquerie =

- Commune
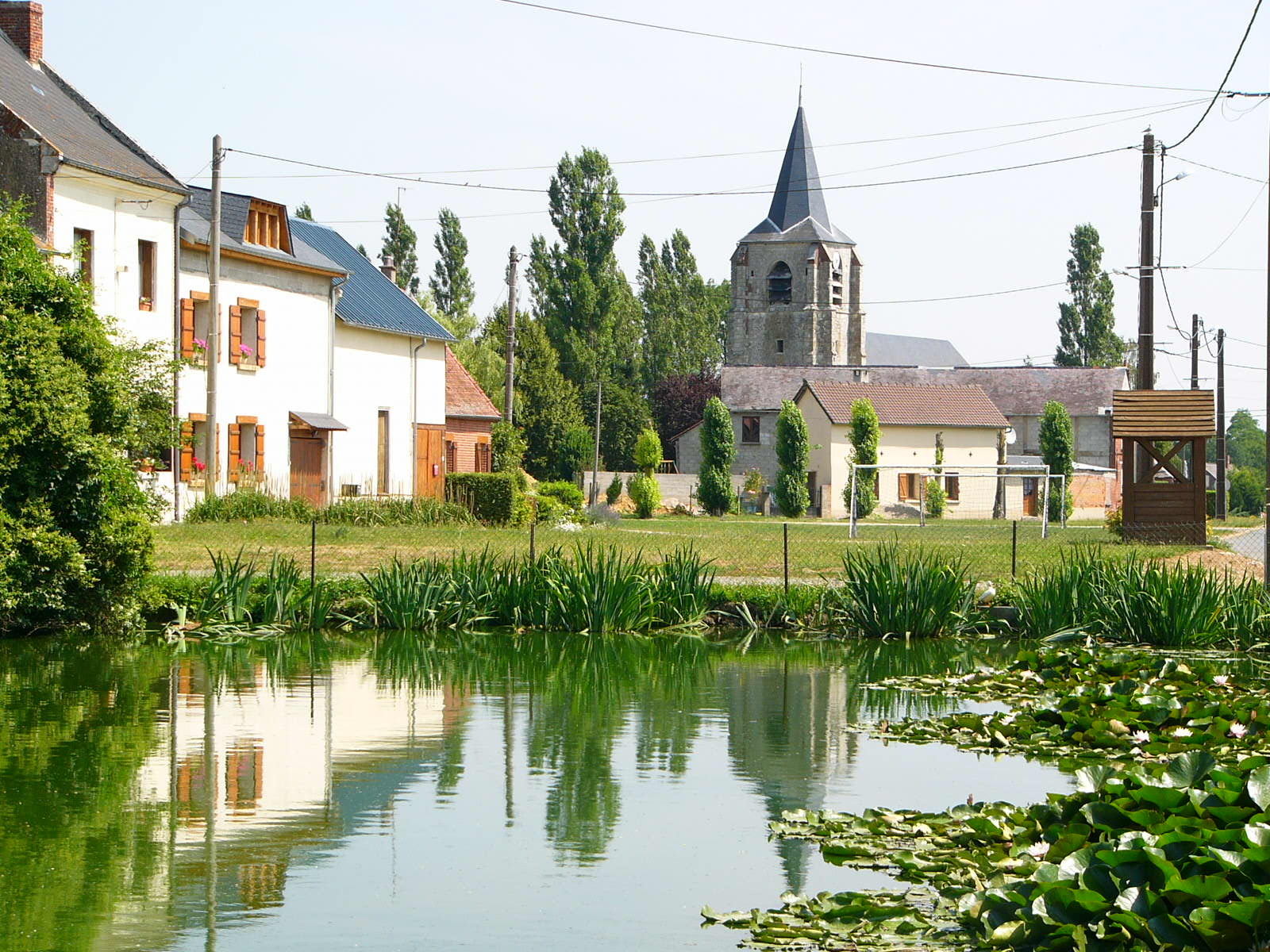
- The church and lake in Lavacquerie
- Location of Lavacquerie
- Location within France Location within Hauts-de-France
- Coordinates: 49°40′56″N 2°05′38″E
- Country: France
- Region: Hauts-de-France
- Department: Oise
- Arrondissement: Beauvais
- Canton: Grandvilliers
- Intercommunality: Picardie verte

Government
  - Mayor (2020–2026): Paul Jamault
- Area^{1}: 8.28 km^{2} (3.20 sq mi)
- Elevation: 185 m (607 ft)
- Highest elevation: 187 m (614 ft)
- Lowest elevation: 118 m (387 ft)
- Population (2023): 182
  - Density: 22.0/km^{2} (56.9/sq mi)
- Time zone: UTC+01:00 (CET)
  - Summer (DST): UTC+02:00 (CEST)
- INSEE/Postal code: 60353 /60120
- ^{1} French Land Register data, which excludes lakes, ponds, glaciers > 1 km^{2} (0.386 sq mi or 247 acres) and river estuaries.

Lavacquerie (French pronunciation: [lavakʁi]) is a commune in the Oise department in northern France.

== See also ==
- Communes of the Oise department
