= Hannaches =

- Commune
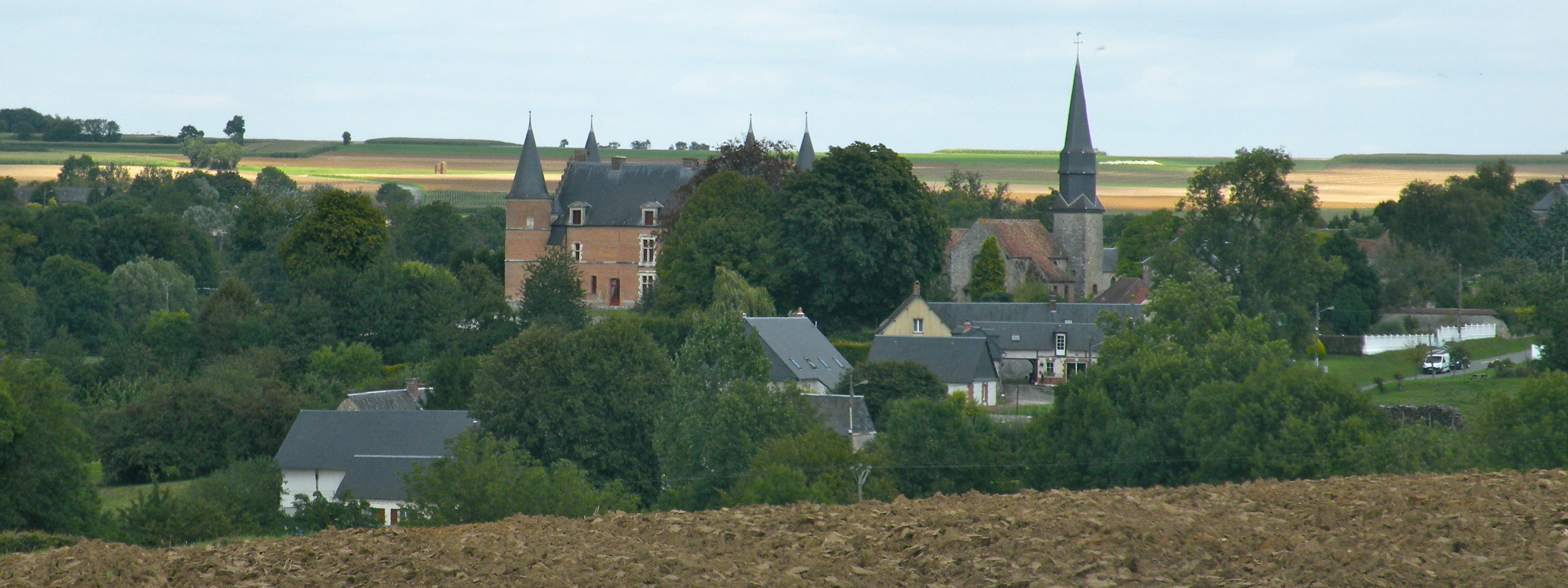
- A general view of Hannaches
- Location of Hannaches
- Location within France Location within Hauts-de-France
- Coordinates: 49°29′56″N 1°48′29″E
- Country: France
- Region: Hauts-de-France
- Department: Oise
- Arrondissement: Beauvais
- Canton: Grandvilliers
- Intercommunality: Picardie Verte

Government
  - Mayor (2020–2026): David Legoix
- Area^{1}: 9.52 km^{2} (3.68 sq mi)
- Elevation: 151 m (495 ft)
- Highest elevation: 218 m (715 ft)
- Lowest elevation: 123 m (404 ft)
- Population (2023): 132
  - Density: 13.9/km^{2} (35.9/sq mi)
- Time zone: UTC+01:00 (CET)
  - Summer (DST): UTC+02:00 (CEST)
- INSEE/Postal code: 60296 /60650
- ^{1} French Land Register data, which excludes lakes, ponds, glaciers > 1 km^{2} (0.386 sq mi or 247 acres) and river estuaries.

Hannaches (French pronunciation: [anaʃ]) is a commune in the Oise department in northern France.

== See also ==
- Communes of the Oise department
