= Le Gallet =

- Commune
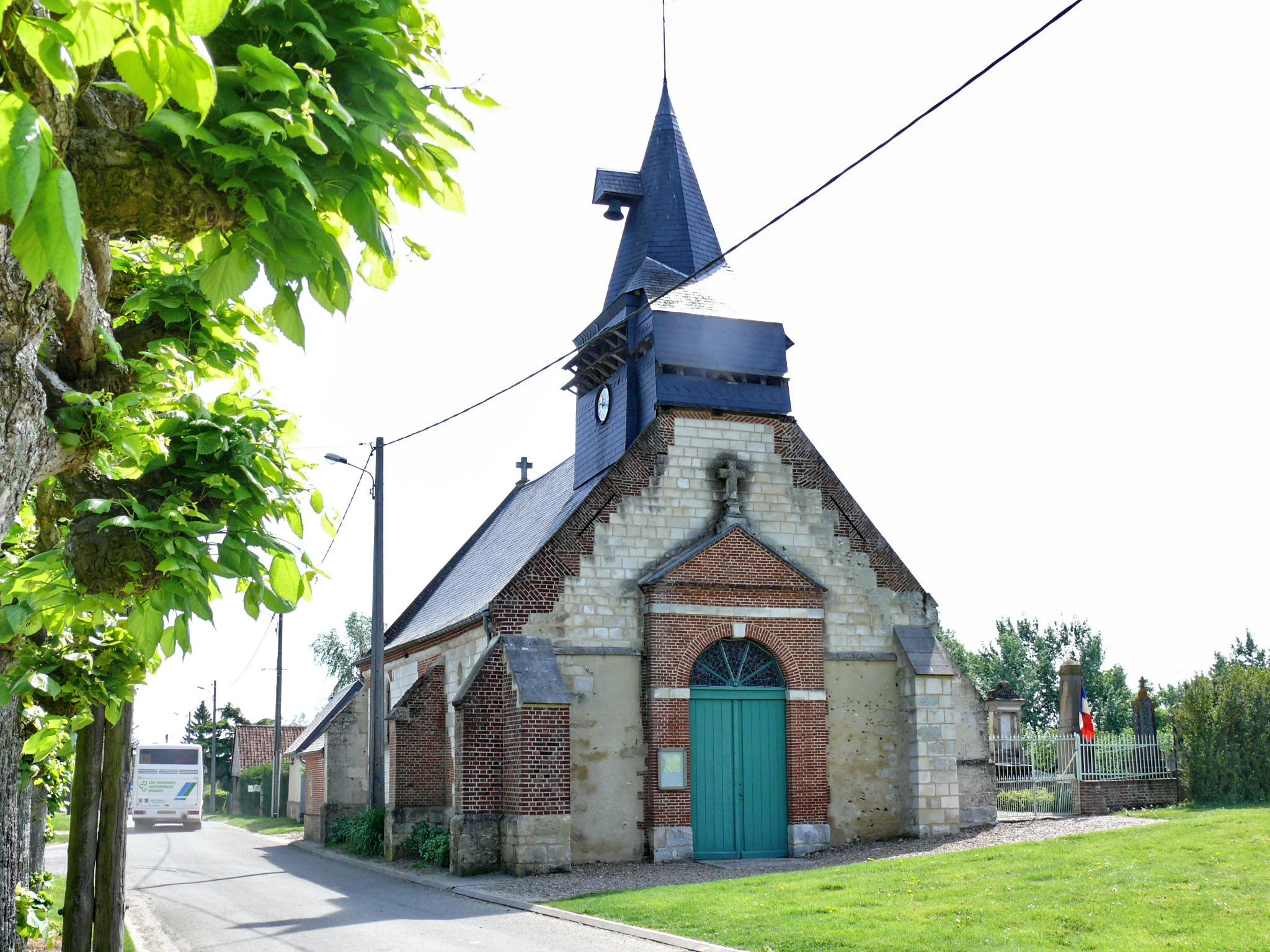
- The church in Le Gallet
- Location of Le Gallet
- Location within France Location within Hauts-de-France
- Coordinates: 49°37′40″N 2°06′33″E
- Country: France
- Region: Hauts-de-France
- Department: Oise
- Arrondissement: Beauvais
- Canton: Saint-Just-en-Chaussée

Government
  - Mayor (2020–2026): Mathieu Boureux
- Area^{1}: 3.47 km^{2} (1.34 sq mi)
- Elevation: 185 m (607 ft)
- Highest elevation: 182 m (597 ft)
- Lowest elevation: 109 m (358 ft)
- Population (2023): 154
  - Density: 44.4/km^{2} (115/sq mi)
- Time zone: UTC+01:00 (CET)
  - Summer (DST): UTC+02:00 (CEST)
- INSEE/Postal code: 60267 /60360
- ^{1} French Land Register data, which excludes lakes, ponds, glaciers > 1 km^{2} (0.386 sq mi or 247 acres) and river estuaries.

Le Gallet (French pronunciation: [lə ɡalɛ]) is a commune in the Oise department in northern France.

== See also ==
- Communes of the Oise department
