= Puiseux-en-Bray =

- Commune
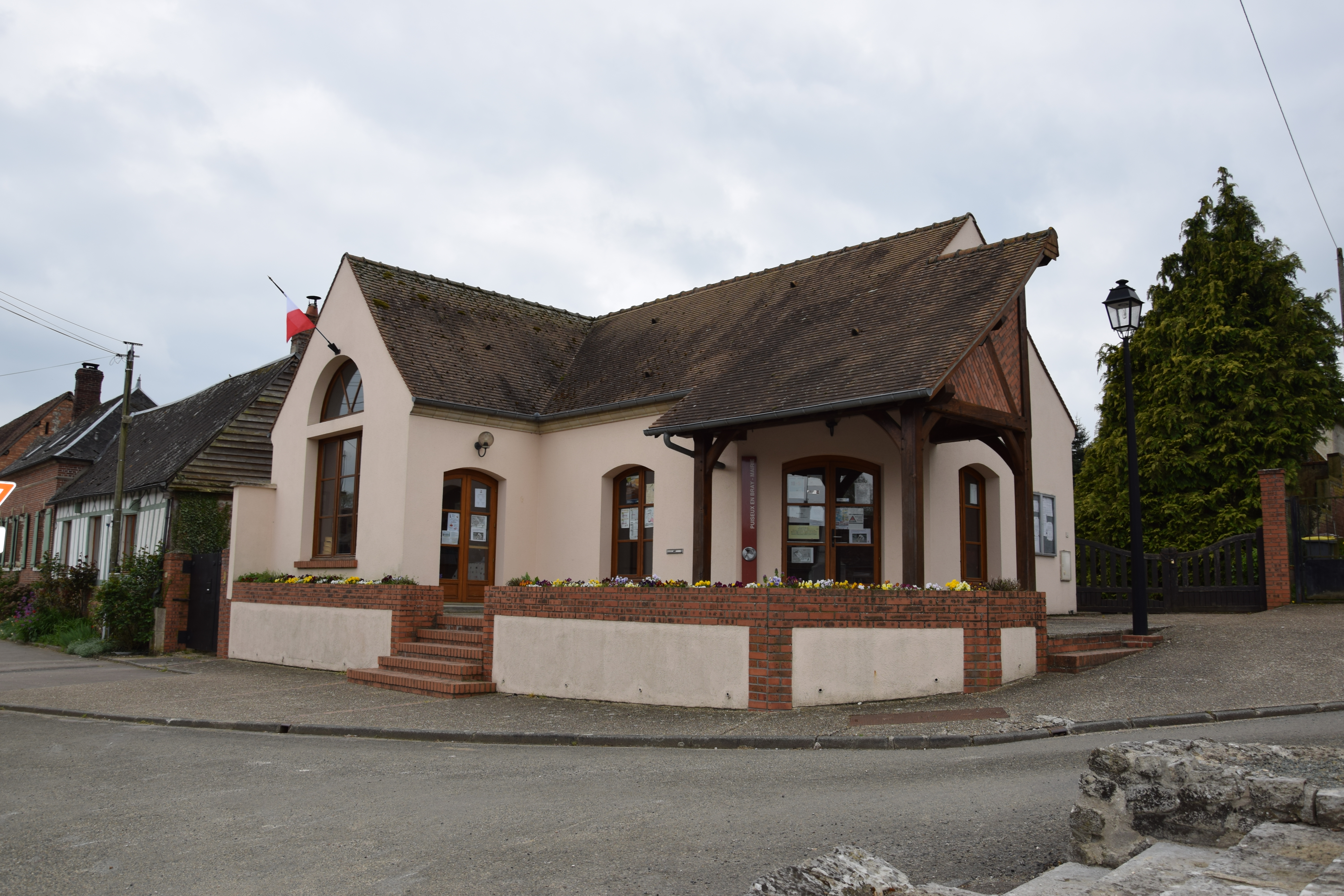
- The town hall in Puiseux-en-Bray

- Coat of arms
- Location of Puiseux-en-Bray
- Location within France Location within Hauts-de-France
- Coordinates: 49°24′58″N 1°47′03″E
- Country: France
- Region: Hauts-de-France
- Department: Oise
- Arrondissement: Beauvais
- Canton: Grandvilliers
- Intercommunality: Pays de Bray

Government
  - Mayor (2020–2026): Jean-François Moisan
- Area^{1}: 8.01 km^{2} (3.09 sq mi)
- Elevation: 150 m (490 ft)
- Highest elevation: 210 m (690 ft)
- Lowest elevation: 102 m (335 ft)
- Population (2023): 398
  - Density: 49.7/km^{2} (129/sq mi)
- Time zone: UTC+01:00 (CET)
  - Summer (DST): UTC+02:00 (CEST)
- INSEE/Postal code: 60516 /60850
- ^{1} French Land Register data, which excludes lakes, ponds, glaciers > 1 km^{2} (0.386 sq mi or 247 acres) and river estuaries.

Puiseux-en-Bray (French pronunciation: [pɥizø ɑ̃ bʁɛ], literally Puiseux in Bray) is a commune, in the Oise department in northern France. As of 2023, the population of the commune was 398.

== See also ==
- Communes of the Oise department
