= Lihus =

- Commune
- Coat of arms
- Location of Lihus
- Location within France Location within Hauts-de-France
- Coordinates: 49°36′21″N 2°02′42″E
- Country: France
- Region: Hauts-de-France
- Department: Oise
- Arrondissement: Beauvais
- Canton: Grandvilliers
- Intercommunality: Picardie Verte

Government
  - Mayor (2023–2026): Odile Moittié
- Area^{1}: 16.03 km^{2} (6.19 sq mi)
- Elevation: 181 m (594 ft)
- Highest elevation: 195 m (640 ft)
- Lowest elevation: 134 m (440 ft)
- Population (2023): 423
  - Density: 26.4/km^{2} (68.3/sq mi)
- Time zone: UTC+01:00 (CET)
  - Summer (DST): UTC+02:00 (CEST)
- INSEE/Postal code: 60365 /60360
- ^{1} French Land Register data, which excludes lakes, ponds, glaciers > 1 km^{2} (0.386 sq mi or 247 acres) and river estuaries.

Lihus is a commune in the Oise department in northern France.

== See also ==
- Communes of the Oise department
