= Saint-Pierre-es-Champs =

- Commune
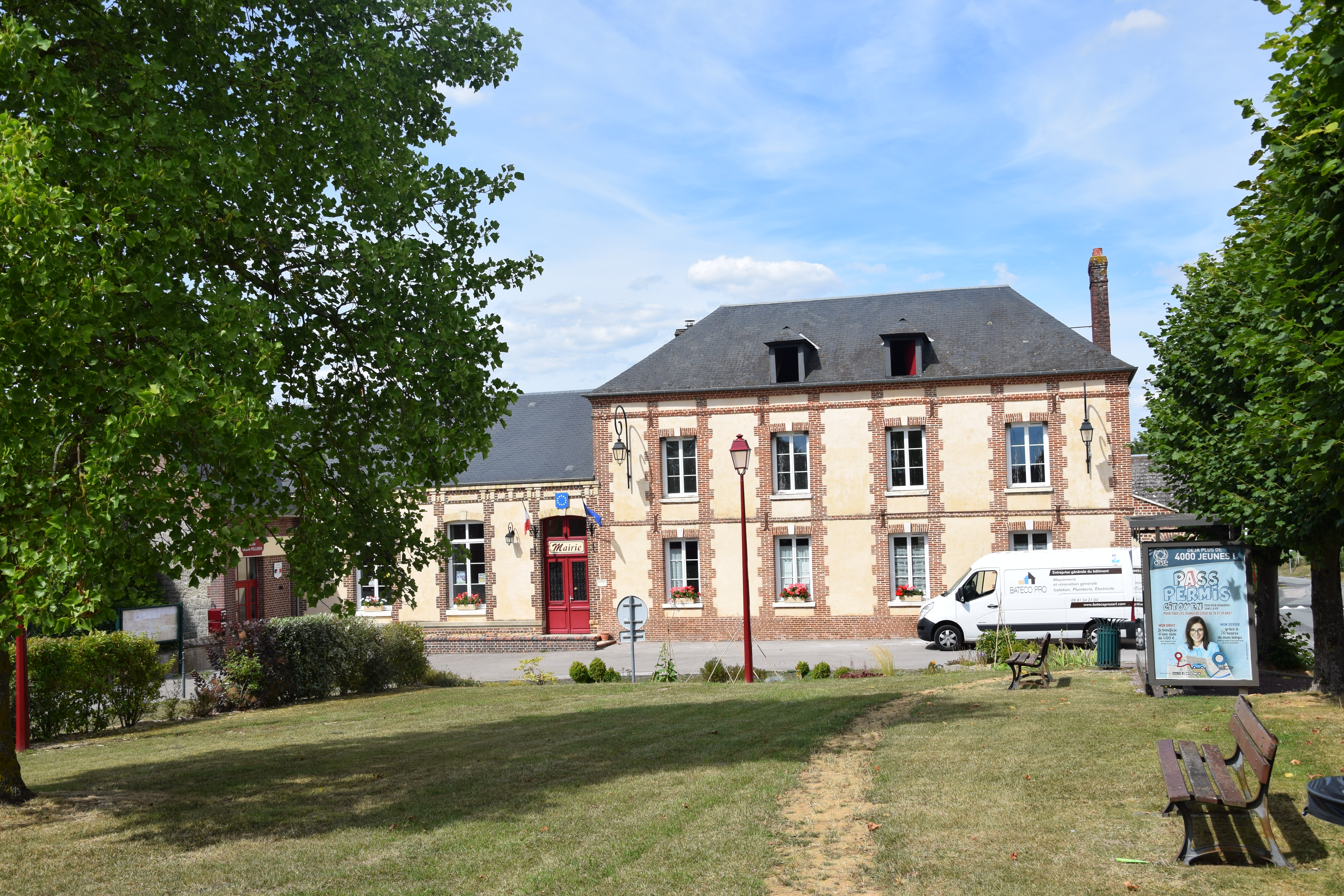
- The town hall in Saint-Pierre-es-Champs
- Location of Saint-Pierre-es-Champs
- Location within France Location within Hauts-de-France
- Coordinates: 49°25′55″N 1°43′41″E
- Country: France
- Region: Hauts-de-France
- Department: Oise
- Arrondissement: Beauvais
- Canton: Grandvilliers
- Intercommunality: Pays de Bray

Government
  - Mayor (2020–2026): Martine Borgoo
- Area^{1}: 10.8 km^{2} (4.2 sq mi)
- Elevation: 191 m (627 ft)
- Highest elevation: 222 m (728 ft)
- Lowest elevation: 77 m (253 ft)
- Population (2023): 672
  - Density: 62.2/km^{2} (161/sq mi)
- Time zone: UTC+01:00 (CET)
  - Summer (DST): UTC+02:00 (CEST)
- INSEE/Postal code: 60592 /60850
- ^{1} French Land Register data, which excludes lakes, ponds, glaciers > 1 km^{2} (0.386 sq mi or 247 acres) and river estuaries.

Saint-Pierre-es-Champs (French pronunciation: [sɛ̃ pjɛʁ ɛ ʃɑ̃]; also Saint-Pierre-ès-Champs) is a commune in the Oise department in northern France.

== See also ==
- Communes of the Oise department
