= Campeaux, Oise =

Campeaux
- Commune
- Location of Campeaux
- Location within France Location within Hauts-de-France
- Coordinates: 49°37′13″N 1°45′25″E
- Country: France
- Region: Hauts-de-France
- Department: Oise
- Arrondissement: Beauvais
- Canton: Grandvilliers
- Intercommunality: Picardie Verte

Government
  - Mayor (2020–2026): Sylvie Coutard
- Area^{1}: 4.74 km^{2} (1.83 sq mi)
- Elevation: 200 m (660 ft)
- Highest elevation: 222 m (728 ft)
- Lowest elevation: 174 m (571 ft)
- Population (2023): 483
  - Density: 102/km^{2} (264/sq mi)
- Time zone: UTC+01:00 (CET)
  - Summer (DST): UTC+02:00 (CEST)
- INSEE/Postal code: 60122 /60220
- ^{1} French Land Register data, which excludes lakes, ponds, glaciers > 1 km^{2} (0.386 sq mi or 247 acres) and river estuaries.

Campeaux (French pronunciation: [kɑ̃po]) is a commune in the Oise department in northern France.

== See also ==
- Communes of the Oise department
