= Neuville-Bosc =

- Commune
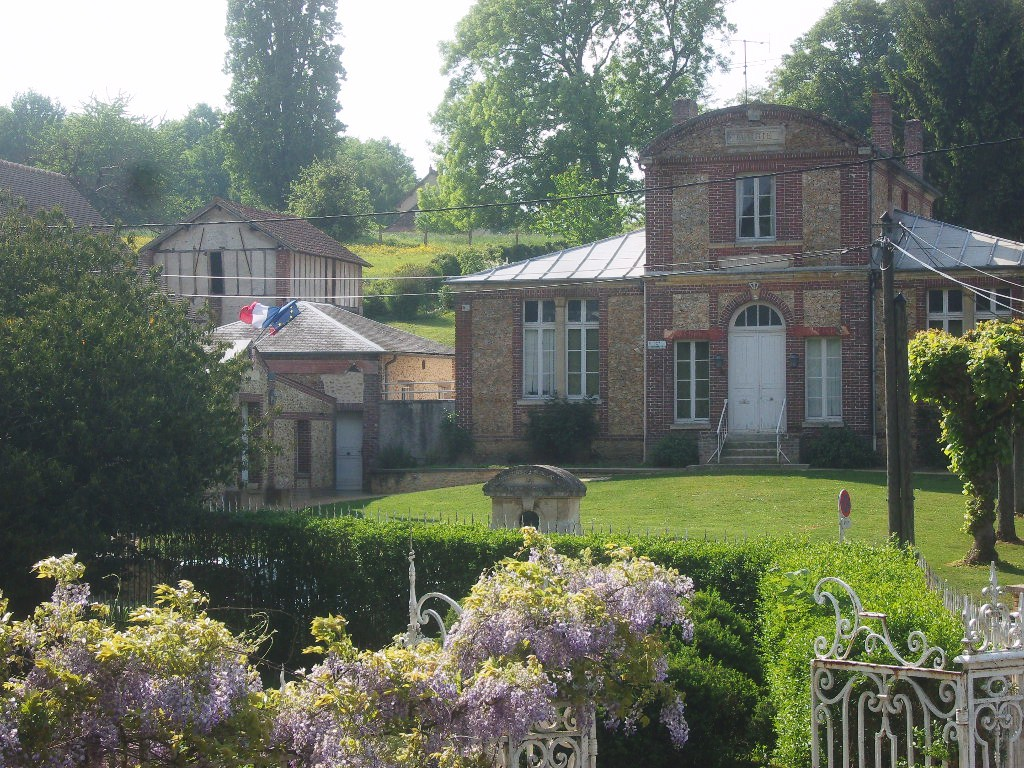
- The town hall in Neuville-Bosc

- Coat of arms
- Location of Neuville-Bosc
- Location within France Location within Hauts-de-France
- Coordinates: 49°12′00″N 2°00′45″E
- Country: France
- Region: Hauts-de-France
- Department: Oise
- Arrondissement: Beauvais
- Canton: Chaumont-en-Vexin
- Intercommunality: Sablons

Government
  - Mayor (2020–2026): Annie Leroy
- Area^{1}: 8.89 km^{2} (3.43 sq mi)
- Elevation: 140 m (460 ft)
- Highest elevation: 217 m (712 ft)
- Lowest elevation: 81 m (266 ft)
- Population (2023): 472
  - Density: 53.1/km^{2} (138/sq mi)
- Time zone: UTC+01:00 (CET)
  - Summer (DST): UTC+02:00 (CEST)
- INSEE/Postal code: 60452 /60119
- ^{1} French Land Register data, which excludes lakes, ponds, glaciers > 1 km^{2} (0.386 sq mi or 247 acres) and river estuaries.

Neuville-Bosc (French pronunciation: [nøvil bɔsk]) is a commune in the Oise department in northern France.

== See also ==
- Communes of the Oise department
