= Hodenc-l'Évêque =

- Commune
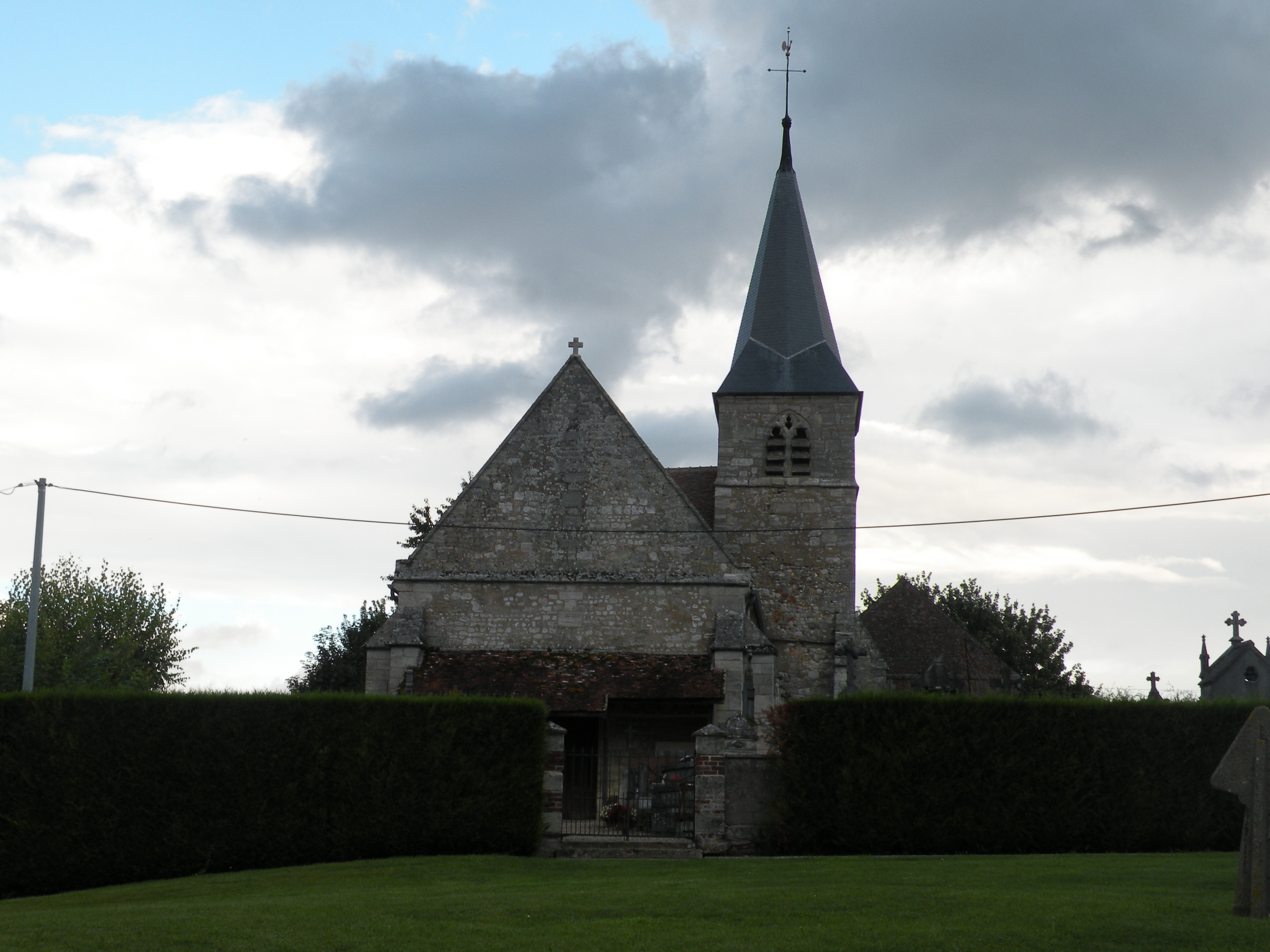
- The church in Hodenc-l'Évêque

- Coat of arms
- Location of Hodenc-l'Évêque
- Location within France Location within Hauts-de-France
- Coordinates: 49°20′14″N 2°08′56″E
- Country: France
- Region: Hauts-de-France
- Department: Oise
- Arrondissement: Beauvais
- Canton: Chaumont-en-Vexin

Government
  - Mayor (2020–2026): Danielle Deblieck
- Area^{1}: 3.47 km^{2} (1.34 sq mi)
- Elevation: 131 m (430 ft)
- Highest elevation: 216 m (709 ft)
- Lowest elevation: 93 m (305 ft)
- Population (2023): 238
  - Density: 68.6/km^{2} (178/sq mi)
- Time zone: UTC+01:00 (CET)
  - Summer (DST): UTC+02:00 (CEST)
- INSEE/Postal code: 60316 /60430
- ^{1} French Land Register data, which excludes lakes, ponds, glaciers > 1 km^{2} (0.386 sq mi or 247 acres) and river estuaries.

Hodenc-l'Évêque is a commune in the Oise department in northern France.

== See also ==
- Communes of the Oise department
