= Brombos =

- Commune
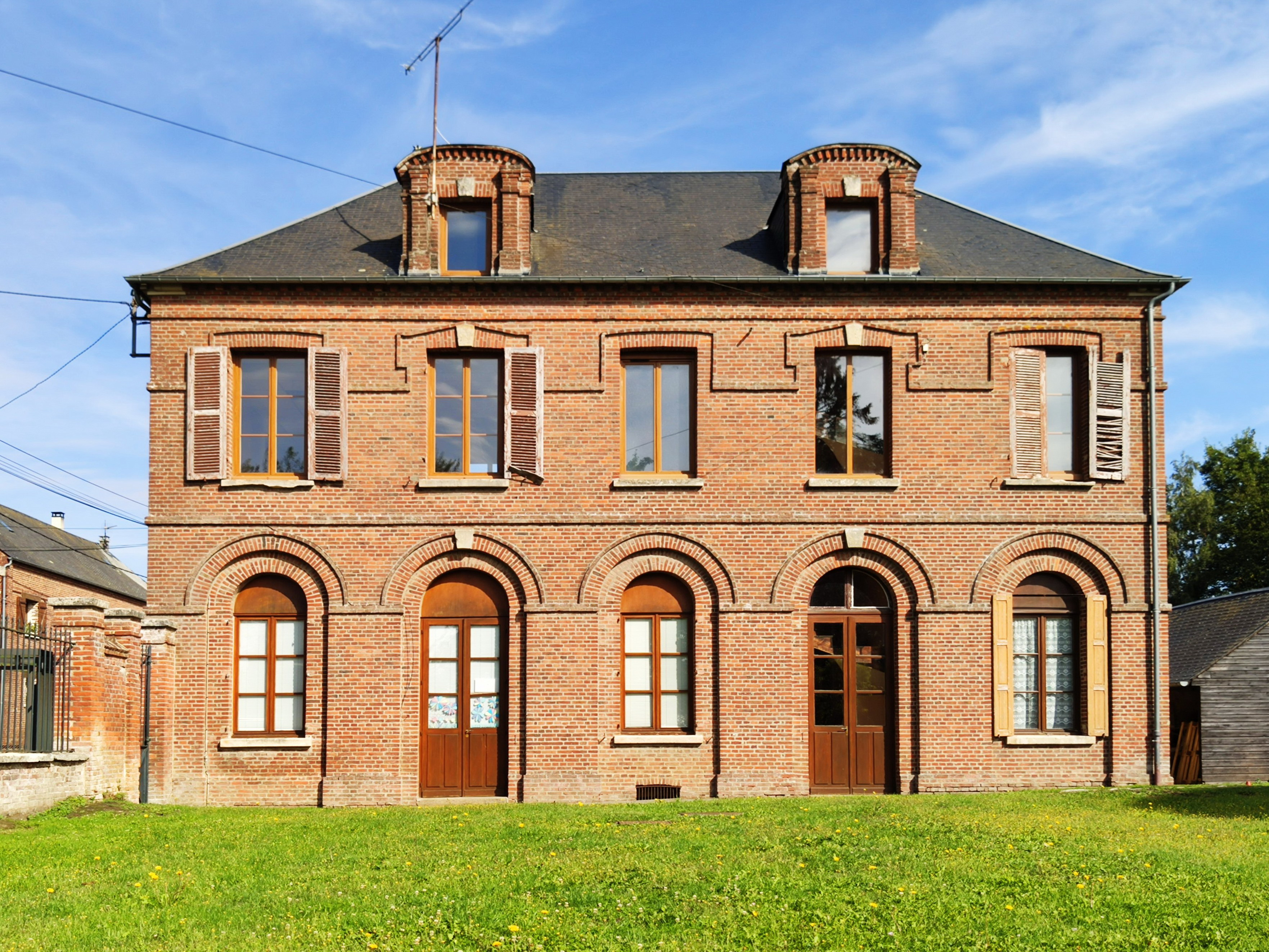
- Town hall
- Location of Brombos
- Location within France Location within Hauts-de-France
- Coordinates: 49°38′50″N 1°53′17″E
- Country: France
- Region: Hauts-de-France
- Department: Oise
- Arrondissement: Beauvais
- Canton: Grandvilliers
- Intercommunality: Picardie Verte

Government
  - Mayor (2020–2026): Étienne Caux
- Area^{1}: 6.9 km^{2} (2.7 sq mi)
- Elevation: 195 m (640 ft)
- Highest elevation: 207 m (679 ft)
- Lowest elevation: 175 m (574 ft)
- Population (2023): 244
  - Density: 35/km^{2} (92/sq mi)
- Time zone: UTC+01:00 (CET)
  - Summer (DST): UTC+02:00 (CEST)
- INSEE/Postal code: 60109 /60210
- ^{1} French Land Register data, which excludes lakes, ponds, glaciers > 1 km^{2} (0.386 sq mi or 247 acres) and river estuaries.

Brombos is a commune in the Oise department in northern France.

== Population ==
Historical population
Year	Pop.	±% p.a.
1968	194	—
1975	193	−0.07%
1982	183	−0.76%
1990	188	+0.34%
1999	218	+1.66%
2007	239	+1.16%
2012	265	+2.09%
2017	256	−0.69%
2023	244	−0.80%
Source: INSEE

== See also ==
- Communes of the Oise department
