= Arrondissement of Beauvais =

Coordinates: 49°26′N 2°04′E

Beauvais
- Arrondissement
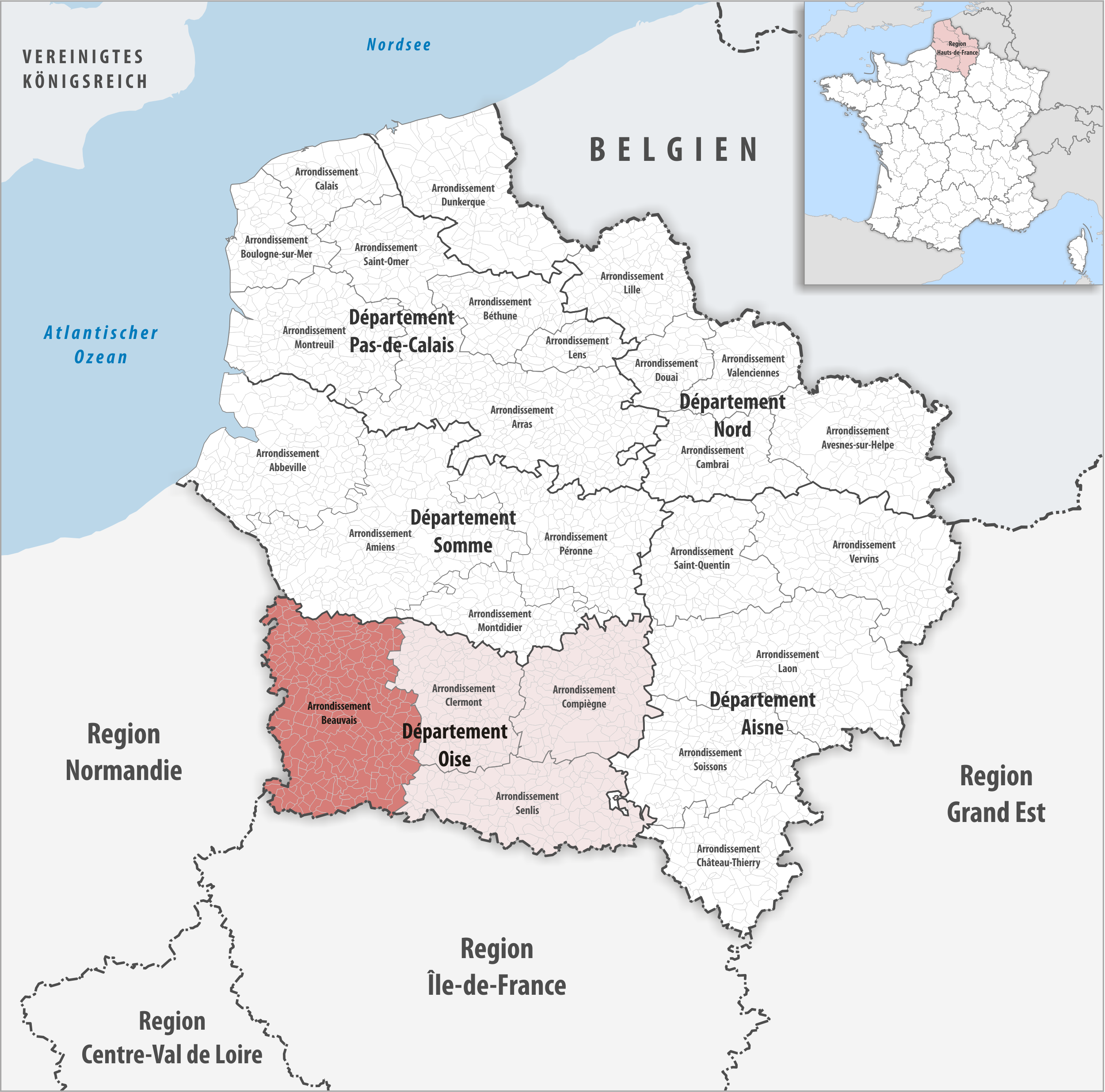
- Location within the region Hauts-de-France
- Country: France
- Region: Hauts-de-France
- Department: Oise
- No. of communes: {{{nbcomm}}}
- Area: 2,099.9 km^{2} (810.8 sq mi)
- Population (2023): 229,677
  - Density: 109.38/km^{2} (283.28/sq mi)
- INSEE code: 601

The arrondissement of Beauvais is an arrondissement of France in the Oise department in the Hauts-de-France region. It comprises 246 communes. Its population is 230,887 (2021), and its area is 2,099.9 km^{2} (810.8 sq mi).

== Composition ==
The communes of the arrondissement of Beauvais, and their INSEE codes, are:

1. Abancourt (60001)
2. Abbecourt (60002)
3. Achy (60004)
4. Allonne (60009)
5. Amblainville (60010)
6. Andeville (60012)
7. Auchy-la-Montagne (60026)
8. Auneuil (60029)
9. Auteuil (60030)
10. Bailleul-sur-Thérain (60041)
11. Bazancourt (60049)
12. Beaudéduit (60051)
13. Beaumont-les-Nonains (60054)
14. Beauvais (60057)
15. Berneuil-en-Bray (60063)
16. Berthecourt (60065)
17. Blacourt (60073)
18. Blancfossé (60075)
19. Blargies (60076)
20. Blicourt (60077)
21. Bonlier (60081)
22. Bonnières (60084)
23. Bornel (60088)
24. Boubiers (60089)
25. Bouconvillers (60090)
26. Boury-en-Vexin (60095)
27. Boutencourt (60097)
28. Bouvresse (60098)
29. Bresles (60103)
30. Briot (60108)
31. Brombos (60109)
32. Broquiers (60110)
33. Buicourt (60114)
34. Campeaux (60122)
35. Canny-sur-Thérain (60128)
36. Catheux (60131)
37. Cauvigny (60135)
38. Cempuis (60136)
39. Chambors (60140)
40. Chaumont-en-Vexin (60143)
41. Chavençon (60144)
42. Choqueuse-les-Bénards (60153)
43. Conteville (60161)
44. Corbeil-Cerf (60162)
45. Cormeilles (60163)
46. La Corne-en-Vexin (60209)
47. Le Coudray-Saint-Germer (60164)
48. Le Coudray-sur-Thelle (60165)
49. Courcelles-lès-Gisors (60169)
50. Crèvecœur-le-Grand (60178)
51. Crillon (60180)
52. Le Crocq (60182)
53. Croissy-sur-Celle (60183)
54. Cuigy-en-Bray (60187)
55. Daméraucourt (60193)
56. Dargies (60194)
57. Delincourt (60195)
58. Doméliers (60199)
59. La Drenne (60196)
60. Élencourt (60205)
61. Énencourt-Léage (60208)
62. Éragny-sur-Epte (60211)
63. Ernemont-Boutavent (60214)
64. Escames (60217)
65. Esches (60218)
66. Escles-Saint-Pierre (60219)
67. Espaubourg (60220)
68. Fay-les-Étangs (60228)
69. Le Fay-Saint-Quentin (60230)
70. Feuquières (60233)
71. Flavacourt (60235)
72. Fleury (60239)
73. Fontaine-Bonneleau (60240)
74. Fontaine-Lavaganne (60242)
75. Fontaine-Saint-Lucien (60243)
76. Fontenay-Torcy (60244)
77. Formerie (60245)
78. Fouilloy (60248)
79. Fouquenies (60250)
80. Fouquerolles (60251)
81. Francastel (60253)
82. Fresne-Léguillon (60257)
83. Frocourt (60264)
84. Le Gallet (60267)
85. Gaudechart (60269)
86. Gerberoy (60271)
87. Glatigny (60275)
88. Goincourt (60277)
89. Gourchelles (60280)
90. Grandvilliers (60286)
91. Grémévillers (60288)
92. Grez (60289)
93. Guignecourt (60290)
94. Hadancourt-le-Haut-Clocher (60293)
95. Halloy (60295)
96. Le Hamel (60297)
97. Hannaches (60296)
98. Hanvoile (60298)
99. Haucourt (60301)
100. Haudivillers (60302)
101. Hautbos (60303)
102. Haute-Épine (60304)
103. Les Hauts-Talican (60694)
104. Hécourt (60306)
105. Hénonville (60309)
106. Herchies (60310)
107. Héricourt-sur-Thérain (60312)
108. Hermes (60313)
109. Hétomesnil (60314)
110. Hodenc-en-Bray (60315)
111. Hodenc-l'Évêque (60316)
112. La Houssoye (60319)
113. Ivry-le-Temple (60321)
114. Jaméricourt (60322)
115. Jouy-sous-Thelle (60327)
116. Juvignies (60328)
117. Laboissière-en-Thelle (60330)
118. Labosse (60331)
119. Lachapelle-aux-Pots (60333)
120. Lachapelle-Saint-Pierre (60334)
121. Lachapelle-sous-Gerberoy (60335)
122. Lachaussée-du-Bois-d'Écu (60336)
123. Lafraye (60339)
124. Lalande-en-Son (60343)
125. Lalandelle (60344)
126. Lannoy-Cuillère (60347)
127. Lattainville (60352)
128. Lavacquerie (60353)
129. Laverrière (60354)
130. Laversines (60355)
131. Lavilletertre (60356)
132. Lhéraule (60359)
133. Liancourt-Saint-Pierre (60361)
134. Lierville (60363)
135. Lihus (60365)
136. Loconville (60367)
137. Lormaison (60370)
138. Loueuse (60371)
139. Luchy (60372)
140. Maisoncelle-Saint-Pierre (60376)
141. Aux Marais (60703)
142. Marseille-en-Beauvaisis (60387)
143. Martincourt (60388)
144. Maulers (60390)
145. Méru (60395)
146. Le Mesnil-Conteville (60397)
147. Le Mesnil-Théribus (60401)
148. Milly-sur-Thérain (60403)
149. Moliens (60405)
150. Monceaux-l'Abbaye (60407)
151. Monneville (60411)
152. Montagny-en-Vexin (60412)
153. Montchevreuil (60256)
154. Montjavoult (60420)
155. Montreuil-sur-Thérain (60426)
156. Monts (60427)
157. Le Mont-Saint-Adrien (60428)
158. Mortefontaine-en-Thelle (60433)
159. Morvillers (60435)
160. Mouchy-le-Châtel (60437)
161. Muidorge (60442)
162. Mureaumont (60444)
163. Neuville-Bosc (60452)
164. La Neuville-sur-Oudeuil (60458)
165. La Neuville-Vault (60460)
166. Nivillers (60461)
167. Noailles (60462)
168. Novillers (60469)
169. Offoy (60472)
170. Omécourt (60476)
171. Ons-en-Bray (60477)
172. Oroër (60480)
173. Oudeuil (60484)
174. Parnes (60487)
175. Pierrefitte-en-Beauvaisis (60490)
176. Pisseleu (60493)
177. Ponchon (60504)
178. Porcheux (60510)
179. Pouilly (60512)
180. Prévillers (60514)
181. Puiseux-en-Bray (60516)
182. Quincampoix-Fleuzy (60521)
183. Rainvillers (60523)
184. Reilly (60528)
185. Rochy-Condé (60542)
186. Romescamps (60545)
187. Rotangy (60549)
188. Rothois (60550)
189. Roy-Boissy (60557)
190. Saint-Arnoult (60566)
191. Saint-Aubin-en-Bray (60567)
192. Saint-Crépin-Ibouvillers (60570)
193. Saint-Deniscourt (60571)
194. Sainte-Geneviève (60575)
195. Saint-Germain-la-Poterie (60576)
196. Saint-Germer-de-Fly (60577)
197. Saint-Léger-en-Bray (60583)
198. Saint-Martin-le-Nœud (60586)
199. Saint-Maur (60588)
200. Saint-Omer-en-Chaussée (60590)
201. Saint-Paul (60591)
202. Saint-Pierre-es-Champs (60592)
203. Saint-Quentin-des-Prés (60594)
204. Saint-Samson-la-Poterie (60596)
205. Saint-Sulpice (60598)
206. Saint-Thibault (60599)
207. Saint-Valery (60602)
208. Sarcus (60604)
209. Sarnois (60605)
210. Le Saulchoy (60608)
211. Savignies (60609)
212. Senantes (60611)
213. Senots (60613)
214. Serans (60614)
215. Sérifontaine (60616)
216. Silly-Tillard (60620)
217. Sommereux (60622)
218. Songeons (60623)
219. Sully (60624)
220. Talmontiers (60626)
221. Therdonne (60628)
222. Thérines (60629)
223. Thibivillers (60630)
224. Thieuloy-Saint-Antoine (60633)
225. Tillé (60639)
226. Tourly (60640)
227. Trie-Château (60644)
228. Trie-la-Ville (60645)
229. Troissereux (60646)
230. Valdampierre (60652)
231. Vaudancourt (60659)
232. Le Vaumain (60660)
233. Le Vauroux (60662)
234. Velennes (60663)
235. Verderel-lès-Sauqueuse (60668)
236. Viefvillers (60673)
237. Villembray (60677)
238. Villeneuve-les-Sablons (60678)
239. Villers-Saint-Barthélemy (60681)
240. Villers-Saint-Sépulcre (60685)
241. Villers-sur-Auchy (60687)
242. Villers-sur-Bonnières (60688)
243. Villers-Vermont (60691)
244. Vrocourt (60697)
245. Wambez (60699)
246. Warluis (60700)

== History ==
The arrondissement of Beauvais was created in 1800.

As a result of the reorganisation of the cantons of France which came into effect in 2015, the borders of the cantons are no longer related to the borders of the arrondissements. The cantons of the arrondissement of Beauvais were, as of January 2015:

1. Auneuil
2. Beauvais-Nord-Est
3. Beauvais-Nord-Ouest
4. Beauvais-Sud-Ouest
5. Chaumont-en-Vexin
6. Le Coudray-Saint-Germer
7. Crèvecoeur-le-Grand
8. Formerie
9. Grandvilliers
10. Marseille-en-Beauvaisis
11. Méru
12. Nivillers
13. Noailles
14. Songeons
