= Le Coudray-Saint-Germer =

- Commune
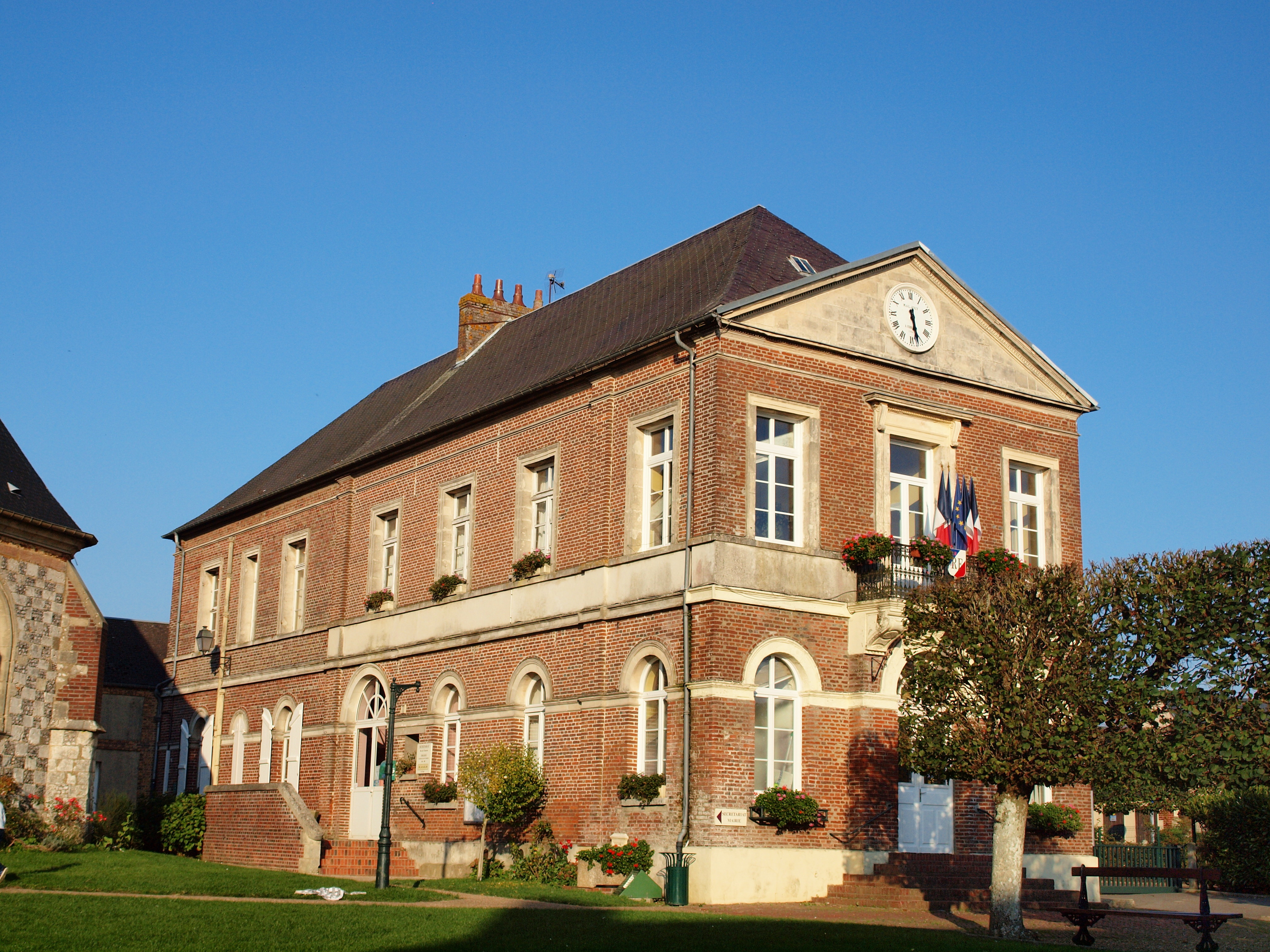
- The town hall in Le Coudray-Saint-Germer

- Coat of arms
- Location of Le Coudray-Saint-Germer
- Location within France Location within Hauts-de-France
- Coordinates: 49°24′45″N 1°50′16″E
- Country: France
- Region: Hauts-de-France
- Department: Oise
- Arrondissement: Beauvais
- Canton: Grandvilliers
- Intercommunality: Pays de Bray

Government
  - Mayor (2020–2026): Gilbert Bervoët
- Area^{1}: 13.48 km^{2} (5.20 sq mi)
- Elevation: 230 m (750 ft)
- Highest elevation: 231 m (758 ft)
- Lowest elevation: 137 m (449 ft)
- Population (2023): 870
  - Density: 65/km^{2} (170/sq mi)
- Time zone: UTC+01:00 (CET)
  - Summer (DST): UTC+02:00 (CEST)
- INSEE/Postal code: 60164 /60850
- ^{1} French Land Register data, which excludes lakes, ponds, glaciers > 1 km^{2} (0.386 sq mi or 247 acres) and river estuaries.

Le Coudray-Saint-Germer (French pronunciation: [lə kudʁɛ sɛ̃ ʒɛʁmɛʁ]) is a commune in the Oise department in northern France.

== See also ==
- Communes of the Oise department
