= Hécourt, Oise =

Hécourt
- Commune
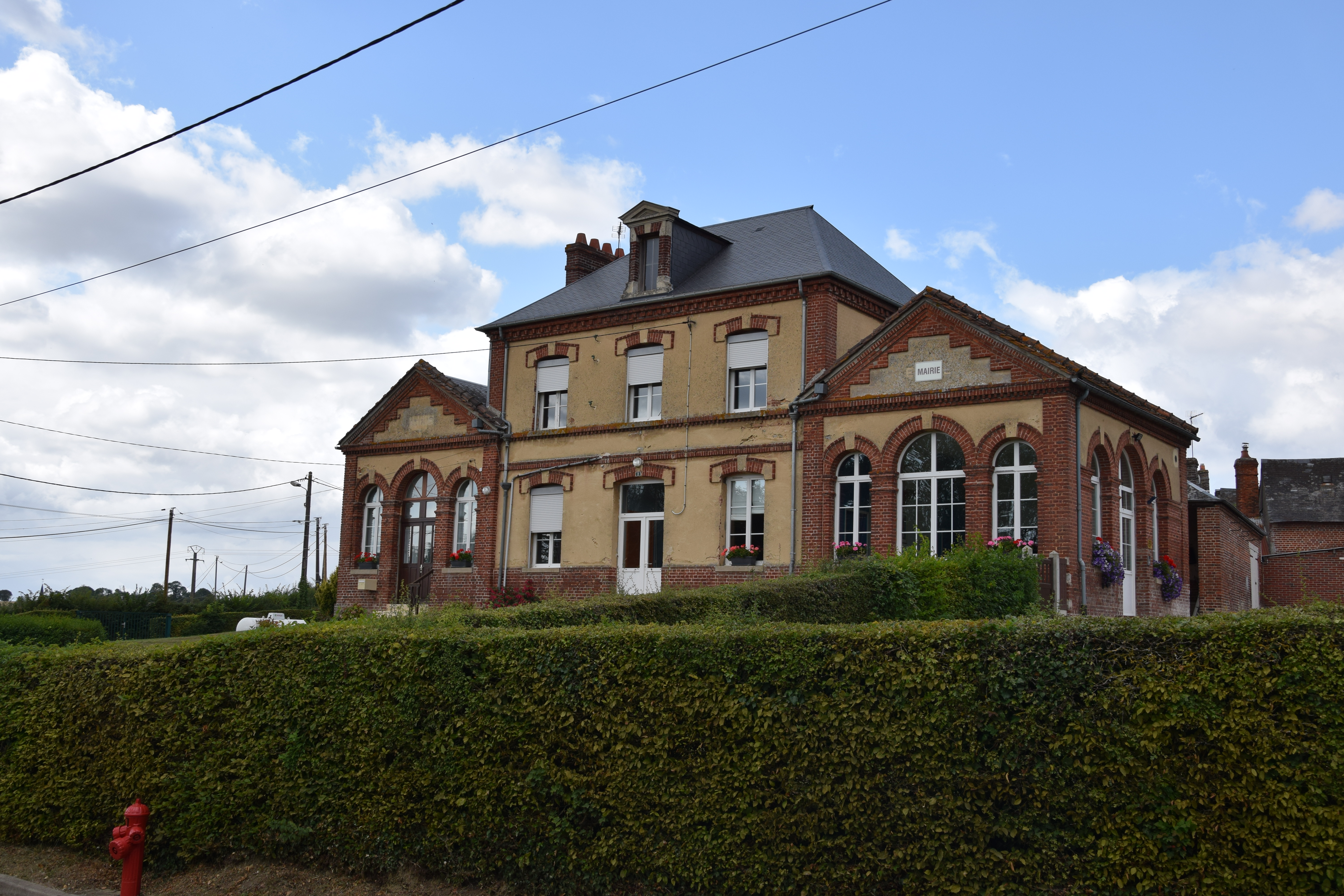
- Town hall
- Location of Hécourt
- Location within France Location within Hauts-de-France
- Coordinates: 49°31′16″N 1°45′39″E
- Country: France
- Region: Hauts-de-France
- Department: Oise
- Arrondissement: Beauvais
- Canton: Grandvilliers
- Intercommunality: Picardie Verte

Government
  - Mayor (2020–2026): André Levasseur
- Area^{1}: 7.47 km^{2} (2.88 sq mi)
- Elevation: 180 m (590 ft)
- Highest elevation: 218 m (715 ft)
- Lowest elevation: 119 m (390 ft)
- Population (2023): 149
  - Density: 19.9/km^{2} (51.7/sq mi)
- Time zone: UTC+01:00 (CET)
  - Summer (DST): UTC+02:00 (CEST)
- INSEE/Postal code: 60306 /60380
- ^{1} French Land Register data, which excludes lakes, ponds, glaciers > 1 km^{2} (0.386 sq mi or 247 acres) and river estuaries.

Hécourt (French pronunciation: [ekuʁ]) is a commune in the Oise department in northern France.

== See also ==
- Communes of the Oise department
