= Liancourt-Saint-Pierre =

- Commune
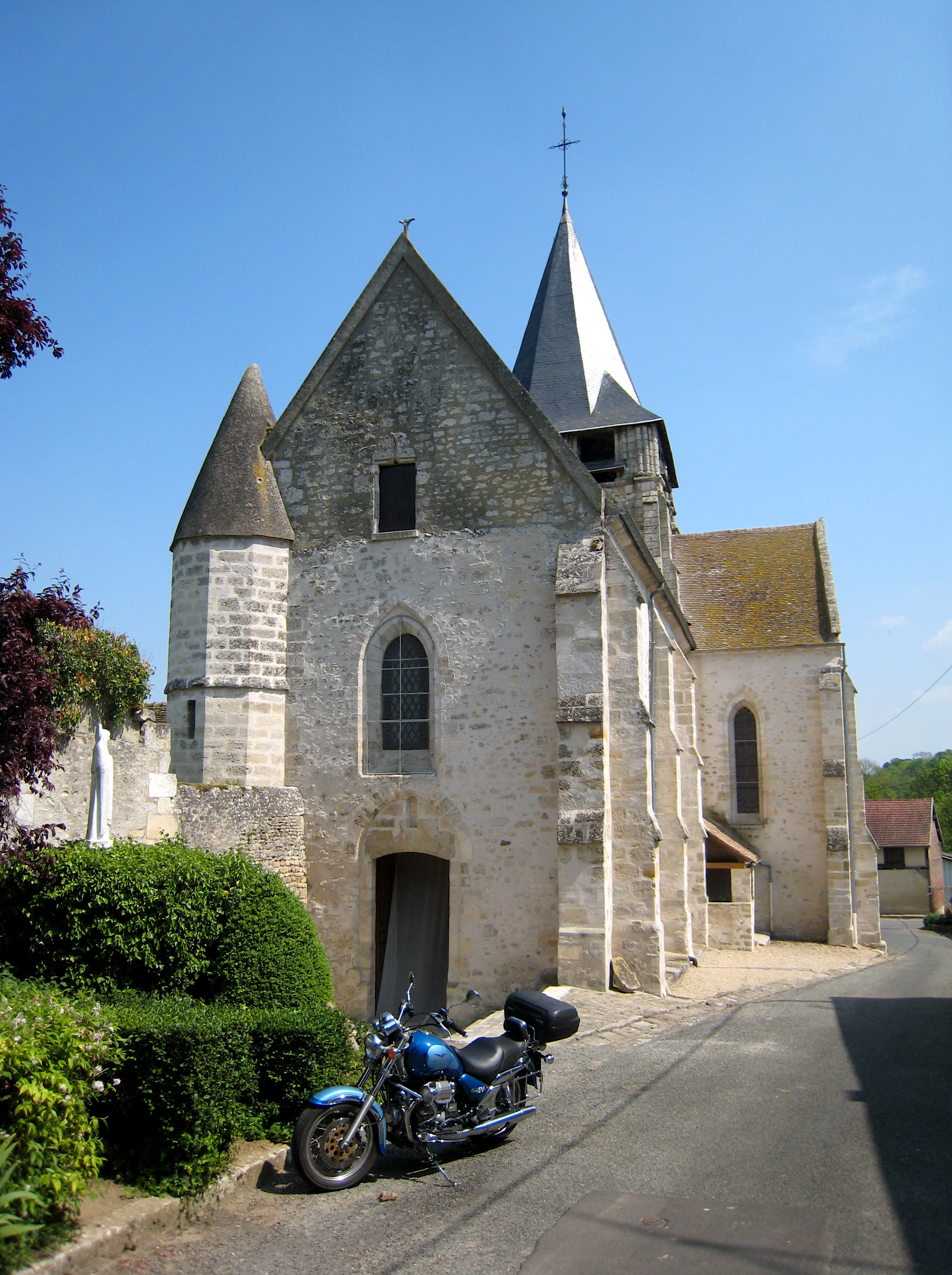
- The church in Liancourt-Saint-Pierre

- Coat of arms
- Location of Liancourt-Saint-Pierre
- Location within France Location within Hauts-de-France
- Coordinates: 49°14′08″N 1°54′31″E
- Country: France
- Region: Hauts-de-France
- Department: Oise
- Arrondissement: Beauvais
- Canton: Chaumont-en-Vexin
- Intercommunality: Vexin Thelle

Government
  - Mayor (2020–2026): Sylvain Le Chatton
- Area^{1}: 12.69 km^{2} (4.90 sq mi)
- Elevation: 108 m (354 ft)
- Highest elevation: 137 m (449 ft)
- Lowest elevation: 63 m (207 ft)
- Population (2023): 573
  - Density: 45.2/km^{2} (117/sq mi)
- Time zone: UTC+01:00 (CET)
  - Summer (DST): UTC+02:00 (CEST)
- INSEE/Postal code: 60361 /60240
- ^{1} French Land Register data, which excludes lakes, ponds, glaciers > 1 km^{2} (0.386 sq mi or 247 acres) and river estuaries.

Liancourt-Saint-Pierre (French pronunciation: [ljɑ̃kuʁ sɛ̃ pjɛʁ]) is a commune in the Oise department in northern France.

== See also ==
- Communes of the Oise department
