= Saint-Arnoult, Oise =

Saint-Arnoult
- Commune
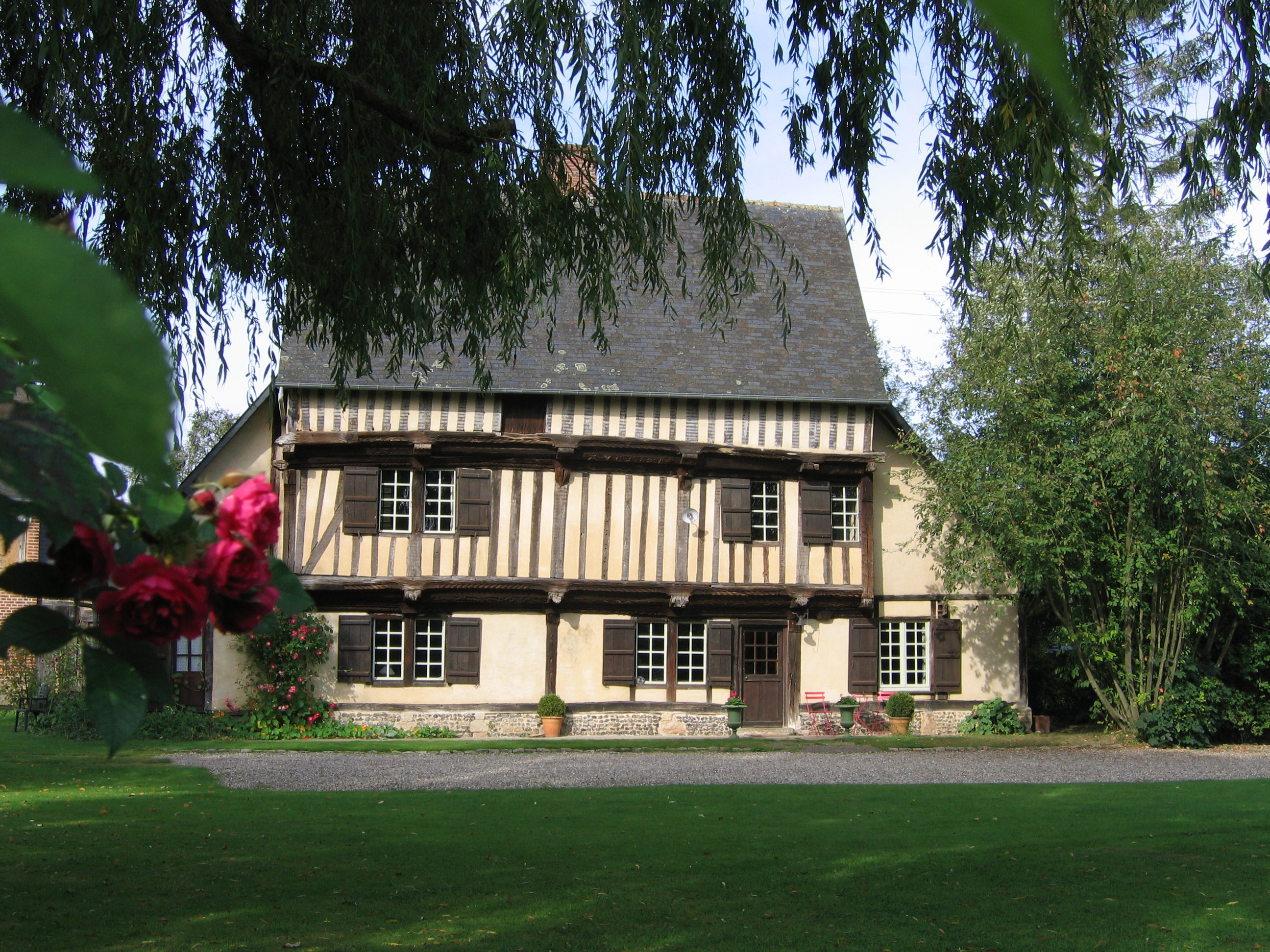
- The priory in Saint-Arnoult
- Location of Saint-Arnoult
- Location within France Location within Hauts-de-France
- Coordinates: 49°37′59″N 1°49′18″E
- Country: France
- Region: Hauts-de-France
- Department: Oise
- Arrondissement: Beauvais
- Canton: Grandvilliers
- Intercommunality: Picardie Verte

Government
  - Mayor (2020–2026): Noël Bouton
- Area^{1}: 7.9 km^{2} (3.1 sq mi)
- Elevation: 190 m (620 ft)
- Highest elevation: 212 m (696 ft)
- Lowest elevation: 164 m (538 ft)
- Population (2023): 202
  - Density: 26/km^{2} (66/sq mi)
- Time zone: UTC+01:00 (CET)
  - Summer (DST): UTC+02:00 (CEST)
- INSEE/Postal code: 60566 /60220
- ^{1} French Land Register data, which excludes lakes, ponds, glaciers > 1 km^{2} (0.386 sq mi or 247 acres) and river estuaries.

Saint-Arnoult (French pronunciation: [sɛ̃.t‿aʁnu]) is a commune in the Oise department in northern France.

== Population ==
Historical population
Year	Pop.	±% p.a.
1968	281	—
1975	241	−2.17%
1982	203	−2.42%
1990	173	−1.98%
1999	172	−0.06%
2007	175	+0.22%
2012	189	+1.55%
2017	217	+2.80%
2023	202	−1.19%
Source: INSEE

== See also ==
- Communes of the Oise department
