= Serans, Oise =

Serans
- Commune
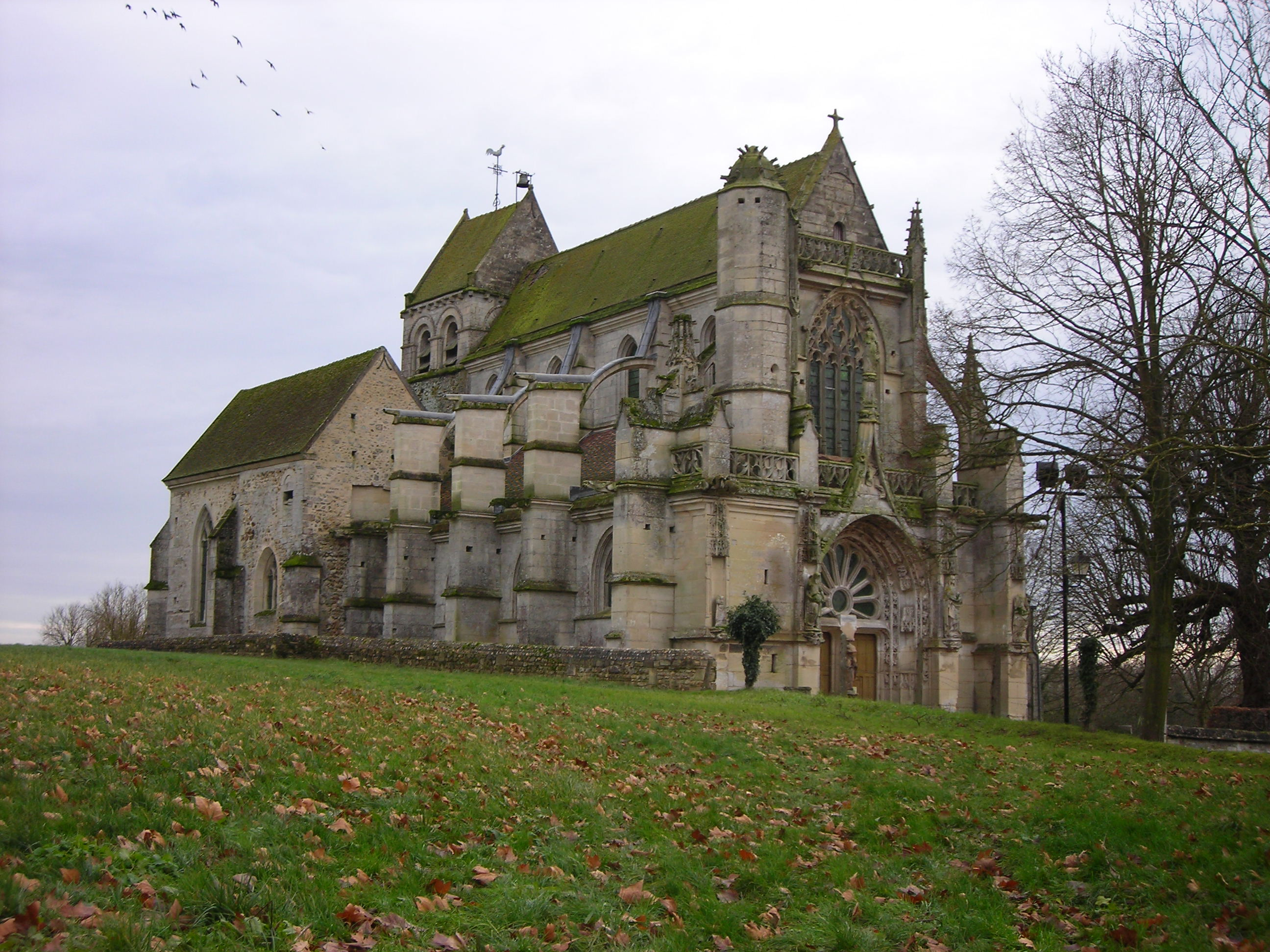
- The church in Serans
- Location of Serans
- Location within France Location within Hauts-de-France
- Coordinates: 49°11′14″N 1°49′55″E
- Country: France
- Region: Hauts-de-France
- Department: Oise
- Arrondissement: Beauvais
- Canton: Chaumont-en-Vexin
- Intercommunality: Vexin Thelle

Government
  - Mayor (2020–2026): Oswald Vandeputte
- Area^{1}: 8.79 km^{2} (3.39 sq mi)
- Elevation: 212 m (696 ft)
- Highest elevation: 212 m (696 ft)
- Lowest elevation: 95 m (312 ft)
- Population (2023): 184
  - Density: 20.9/km^{2} (54.2/sq mi)
- Time zone: UTC+01:00 (CET)
  - Summer (DST): UTC+02:00 (CEST)
- INSEE/Postal code: 60614 /60240
- ^{1} French Land Register data, which excludes lakes, ponds, glaciers > 1 km^{2} (0.386 sq mi or 247 acres) and river estuaries.

Serans (French pronunciation: [səʁɑ̃]) is a commune in the Oise department in northern France.

== See also ==
- Communes of the Oise department
