= Fontaine-Bonneleau =

- Commune
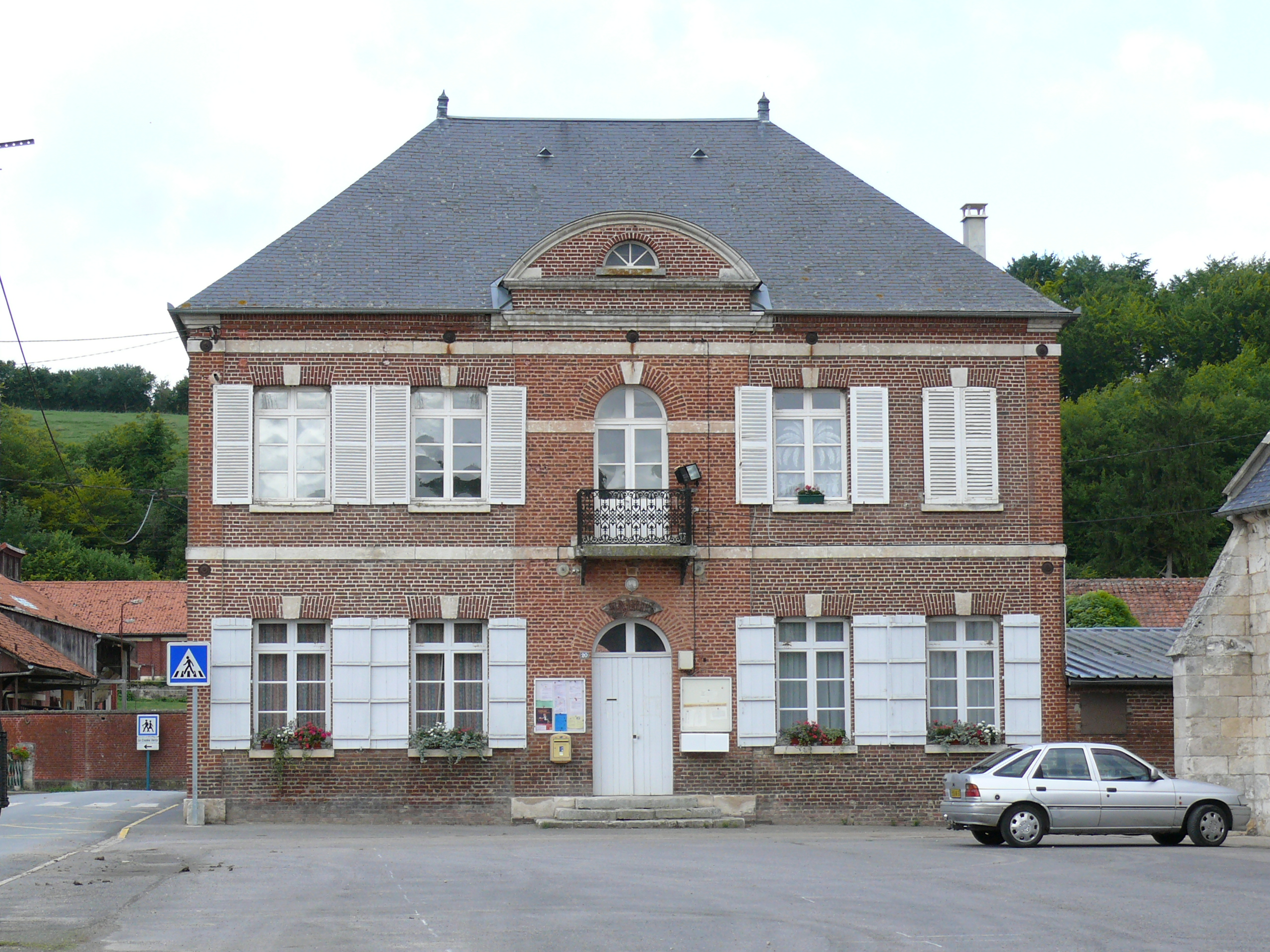
- The town hall in Fontaine-Bonneleau
- Location of Fontaine-Bonneleau
- Location within France Location within Hauts-de-France
- Coordinates: 49°39′43″N 2°09′02″E
- Country: France
- Region: Hauts-de-France
- Department: Oise
- Arrondissement: Beauvais
- Canton: Saint-Just-en-Chaussée
- Intercommunality: Oise Picarde

Government
  - Mayor (2020–2026): Sylvie Leclerc
- Area^{1}: 16.37 km^{2} (6.32 sq mi)
- Elevation: 85 m (279 ft)
- Highest elevation: 175 m (574 ft)
- Lowest elevation: 72 m (236 ft)
- Population (2023): 236
  - Density: 14.4/km^{2} (37.3/sq mi)
- Time zone: UTC+01:00 (CET)
  - Summer (DST): UTC+02:00 (CEST)
- INSEE/Postal code: 60240 /60360
- ^{1} French Land Register data, which excludes lakes, ponds, glaciers > 1 km^{2} (0.386 sq mi or 247 acres) and river estuaries.

Fontaine-Bonneleau (French pronunciation: [fɔ̃tɛn bɔnlo]) is a commune in the Oise department in northern France.

== See also ==
- Communes of the Oise department
