= Pouilly, Oise =

Pouilly
- Commune
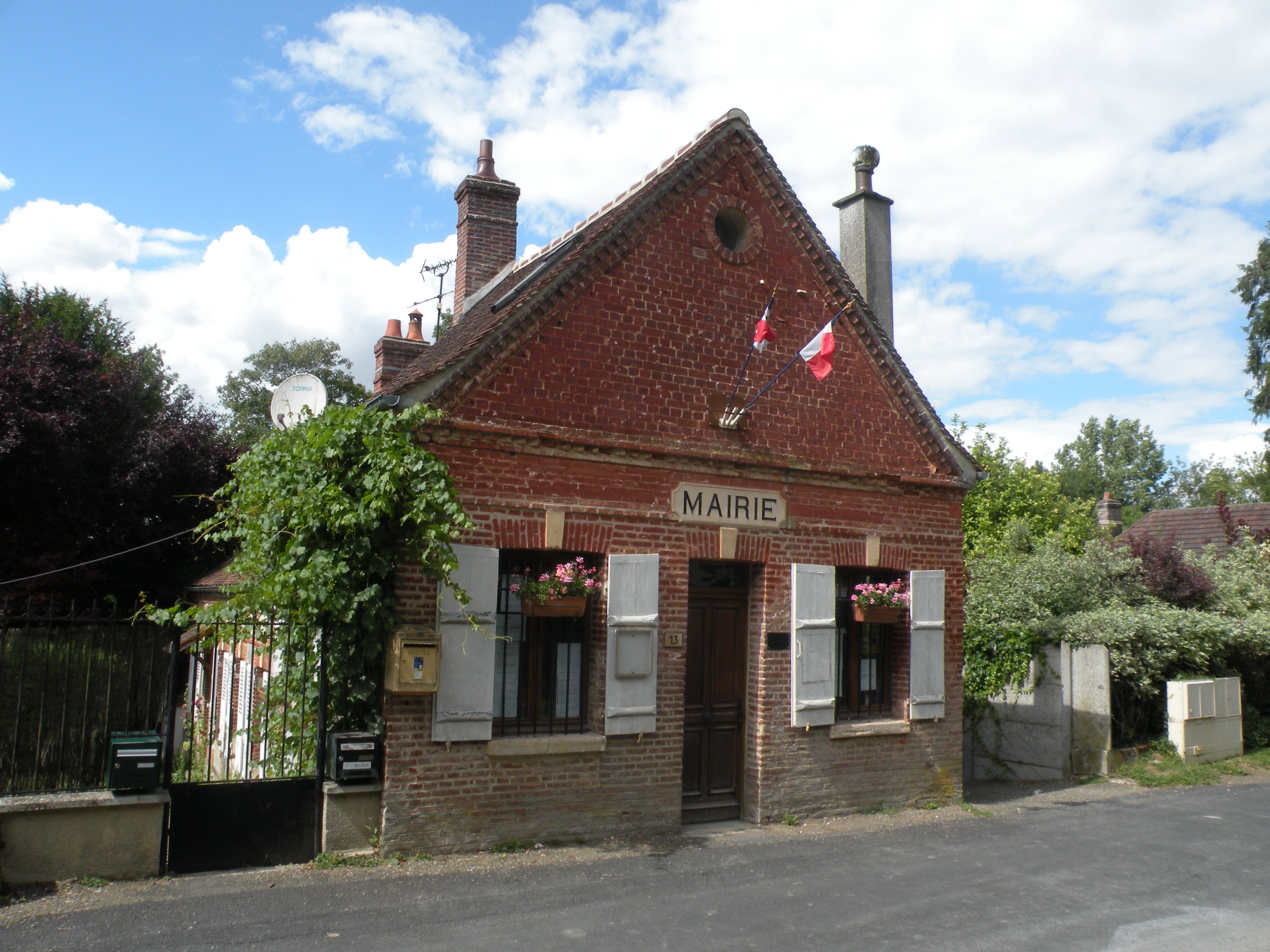
- The town hall in Pouilly
- Location of Pouilly
- Location within France Location within Hauts-de-France
- Coordinates: 49°16′23″N 2°01′52″E
- Country: France
- Region: Hauts-de-France
- Department: Oise
- Arrondissement: Beauvais
- Canton: Chaumont-en-Vexin
- Intercommunality: Sablons

Government
  - Mayor (2020–2026): Daniel Cauchies
- Area^{1}: 3.81 km^{2} (1.47 sq mi)
- Elevation: 110 m (360 ft)
- Highest elevation: 165 m (541 ft)
- Lowest elevation: 96 m (315 ft)
- Population (2023): 148
  - Density: 38.8/km^{2} (101/sq mi)
- Time zone: UTC+01:00 (CET)
  - Summer (DST): UTC+02:00 (CEST)
- INSEE/Postal code: 60512 /60790
- ^{1} French Land Register data, which excludes lakes, ponds, glaciers > 1 km^{2} (0.386 sq mi or 247 acres) and river estuaries.

Pouilly (French pronunciation: [puji]) is a commune in the Oise department in northern France.

== See also ==
- Communes of the Oise department
