= Saint-Thibault, Oise =

Saint-Thibault
- Commune
- Coat of arms
- Location of Saint-Thibault
- Location within France Location within Hauts-de-France
- Coordinates: 49°42′02″N 1°50′46″E
- Country: France
- Region: Hauts-de-France
- Department: Oise
- Arrondissement: Beauvais
- Canton: Grandvilliers
- Intercommunality: Picardie Verte

Government
  - Mayor (2020–2026): Nicolas Goubin
- Area^{1}: 10.62 km^{2} (4.10 sq mi)
- Elevation: 210 m (690 ft)
- Highest elevation: 221 m (725 ft)
- Lowest elevation: 189 m (620 ft)
- Population (2023): 281
  - Density: 26.5/km^{2} (68.5/sq mi)
- Time zone: UTC+01:00 (CET)
  - Summer (DST): UTC+02:00 (CEST)
- INSEE/Postal code: 60599 /60210
- ^{1} French Land Register data, which excludes lakes, ponds, glaciers > 1 km^{2} (0.386 sq mi or 247 acres) and river estuaries.

Saint-Thibault (French pronunciation: [sɛ̃ tibo]) is a commune in the Oise department in northern France.

== See also ==
- Communes of the Oise department
