= Dargies =

- Commune
- Coat of arms
- Location of Dargies
- Location within France Location within Hauts-de-France
- Coordinates: 49°42′06″N 1°59′23″E
- Country: France
- Region: Hauts-de-France
- Department: Oise
- Arrondissement: Beauvais
- Canton: Grandvilliers
- Intercommunality: Picardie Verte

Government
  - Mayor (2020–2026): Charly Lefebvre
- Area^{1}: 14.42 km^{2} (5.57 sq mi)
- Elevation: 174 m (571 ft)
- Highest elevation: 189 m (620 ft)
- Lowest elevation: 120 m (390 ft)
- Population (2023): 239
  - Density: 16.6/km^{2} (42.9/sq mi)
- Time zone: UTC+01:00 (CET)
  - Summer (DST): UTC+02:00 (CEST)
- INSEE/Postal code: 60194 /60210
- ^{1} French Land Register data, which excludes lakes, ponds, glaciers > 1 km^{2} (0.386 sq mi or 247 acres) and river estuaries.

Dargies (French pronunciation: [daʁʒi]) is a commune in the Oise department in northern France.

== See also ==
- Communes of the Oise department
