= Martincourt, Oise =

Martincourt
- Commune
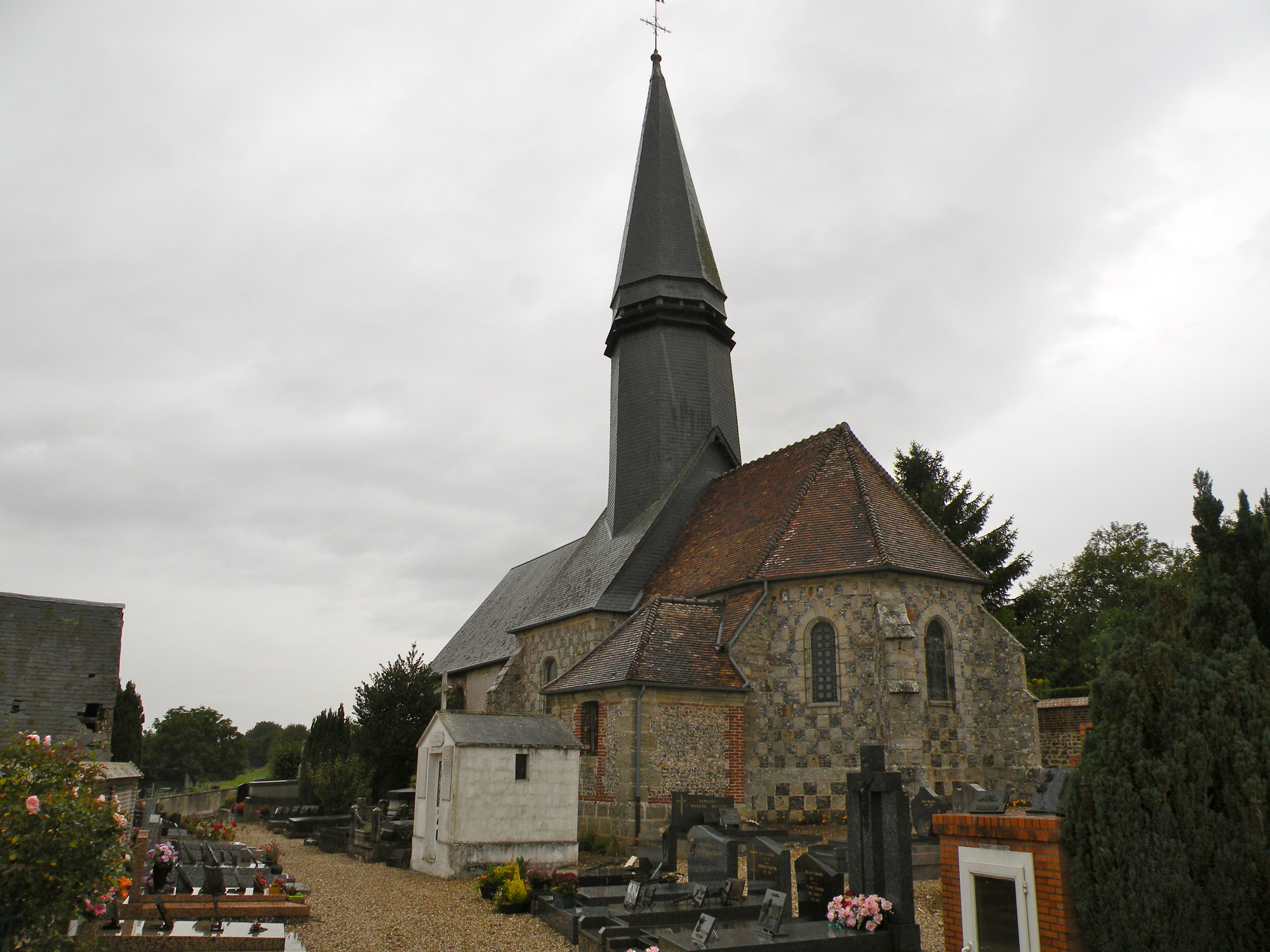
- The church in Martincourt
- Location of Martincourt
- Location within France Location within Hauts-de-France
- Coordinates: 49°31′26″N 1°53′54″E
- Country: France
- Region: Hauts-de-France
- Department: Oise
- Arrondissement: Beauvais
- Canton: Grandvilliers
- Intercommunality: Picardie Verte

Government
  - Mayor (2020–2026): Charlie Bourguignon
- Area^{1}: 5.08 km^{2} (1.96 sq mi)
- Elevation: 125 m (410 ft)
- Highest elevation: 176 m (577 ft)
- Lowest elevation: 95 m (312 ft)
- Population (2023): 136
  - Density: 26.8/km^{2} (69.3/sq mi)
- Time zone: UTC+01:00 (CET)
  - Summer (DST): UTC+02:00 (CEST)
- INSEE/Postal code: 60388 /60112
- ^{1} French Land Register data, which excludes lakes, ponds, glaciers > 1 km^{2} (0.386 sq mi or 247 acres) and river estuaries.

Martincourt is a commune in the Oise department in northern France.

== See also ==
- Communes of the Oise department
