= Villers-sur-Bonnières =

- Commune
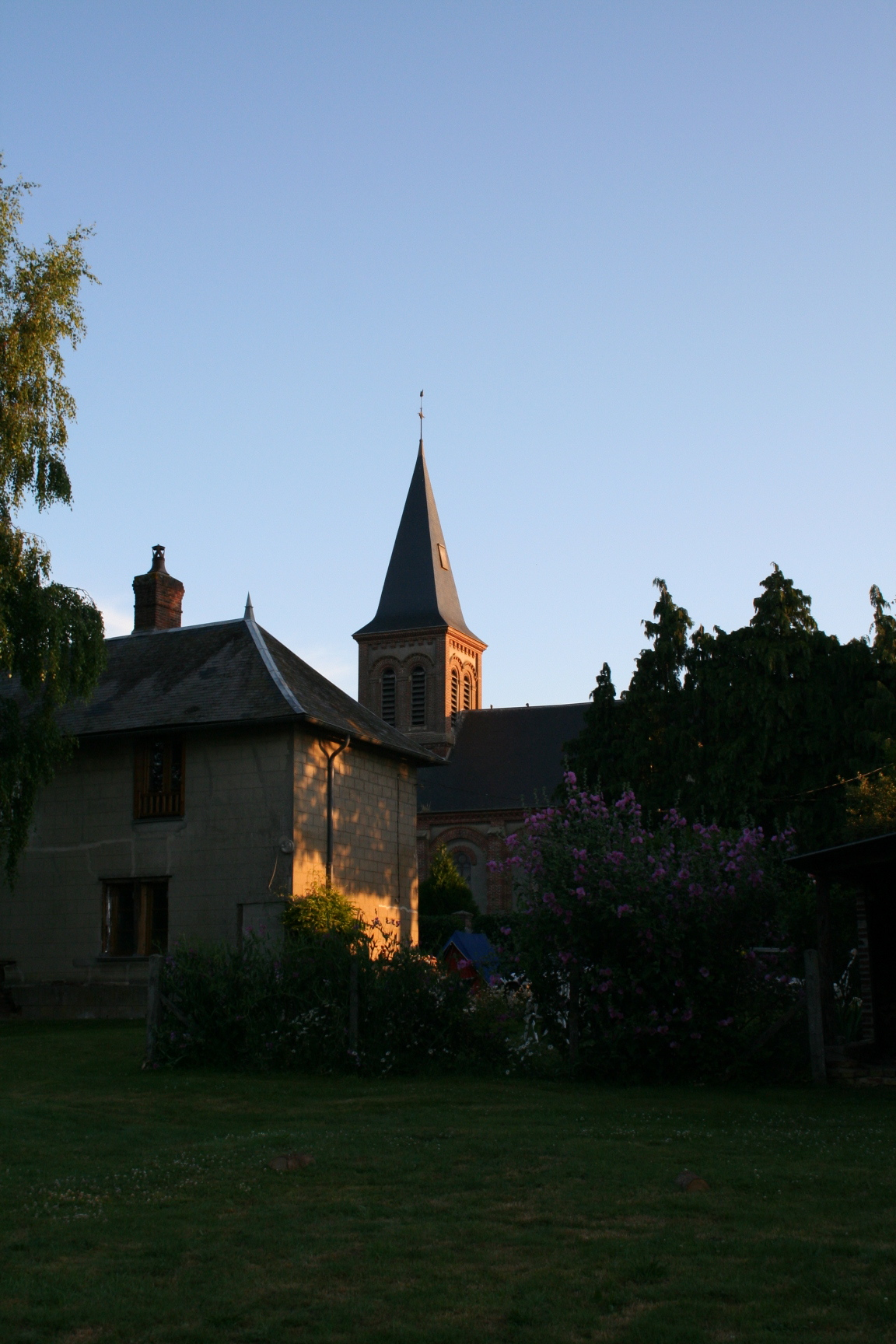
- The church in Villers-sur-Bonnières
- Location of Villers-sur-Bonnières
- Location within France Location within Hauts-de-France
- Coordinates: 49°32′20″N 1°57′59″E
- Country: France
- Region: Hauts-de-France
- Department: Oise
- Arrondissement: Beauvais
- Canton: Grandvilliers
- Intercommunality: Picardie Verte

Government
  - Mayor (2020–2026): Vincent Ferry
- Area^{1}: 4.02 km^{2} (1.55 sq mi)
- Elevation: 150 m (490 ft)
- Highest elevation: 168 m (551 ft)
- Lowest elevation: 110 m (360 ft)
- Population (2023): 130
  - Density: 32/km^{2} (84/sq mi)
- Time zone: UTC+01:00 (CET)
  - Summer (DST): UTC+02:00 (CEST)
- INSEE/Postal code: 60688 /60860
- ^{1} French Land Register data, which excludes lakes, ponds, glaciers > 1 km^{2} (0.386 sq mi or 247 acres) and river estuaries.

Villers-sur-Bonnières (French pronunciation: [vilɛʁ syʁ bɔnjɛʁ], lit. 'Villers on Bonnières') is a commune in the Oise department in northern France.

== See also ==
- Communes of the Oise department
