= Blicourt =

- Commune
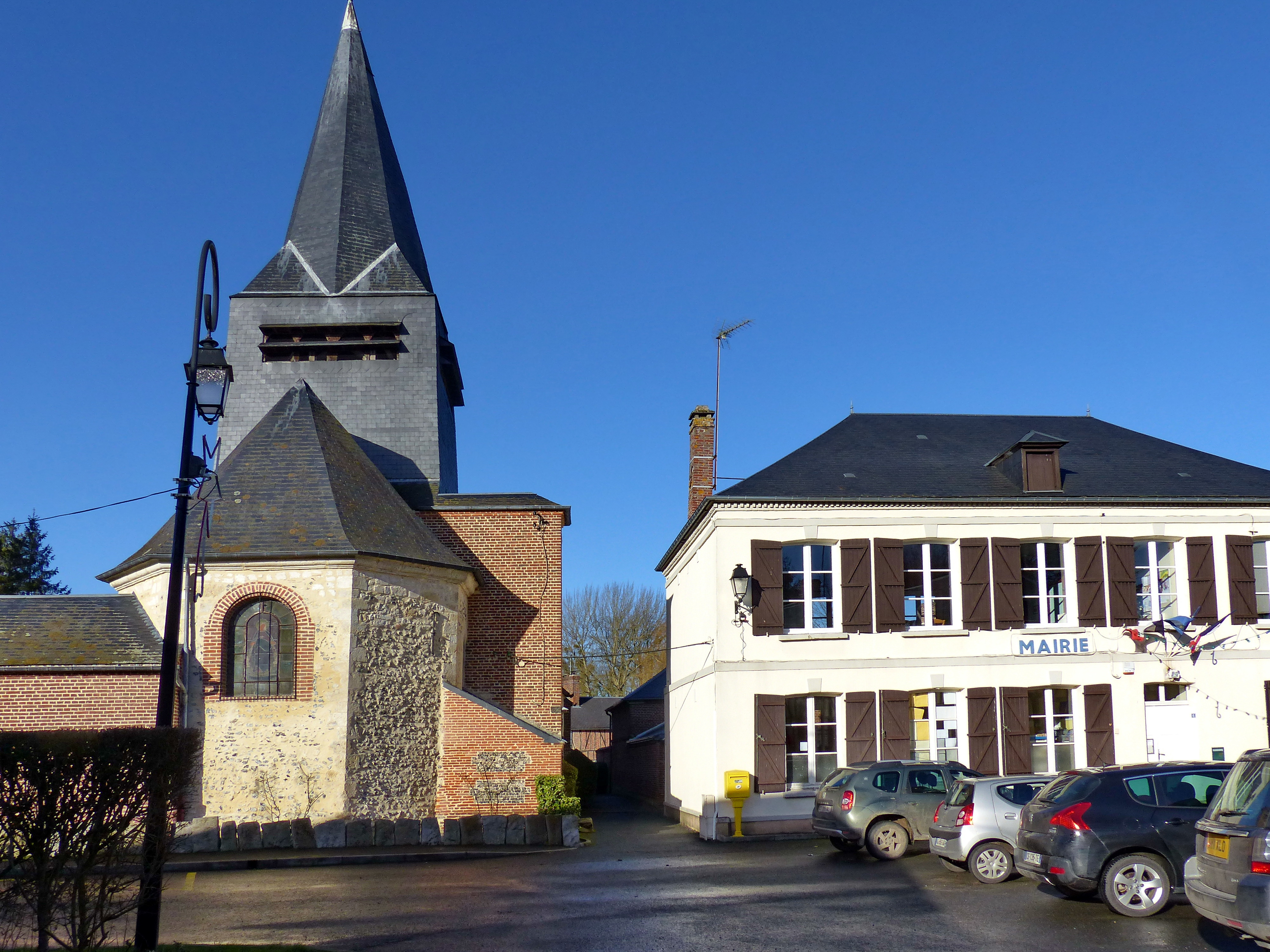
- The church and town hall in Blicourt

- Coat of arms
- Location of Blicourt
- Location within France Location within Hauts-de-France
- Coordinates: 49°33′27″N 2°03′28″E
- Country: France
- Region: Hauts-de-France
- Department: Oise
- Arrondissement: Beauvais
- Canton: Grandvilliers
- Intercommunality: Picardie Verte

Government
  - Mayor (2020–2026): Gérard Defrance
- Area^{1}: 14.57 km^{2} (5.63 sq mi)
- Highest elevation: 176 m (577 ft)
- Lowest elevation: 111 m (364 ft)
- Population (2023): 356
  - Density: 24.4/km^{2} (63.3/sq mi)
- Time zone: UTC+01:00 (CET)
  - Summer (DST): UTC+02:00 (CEST)
- INSEE/Postal code: 60077 /60860
- ^{1} French Land Register data, which excludes lakes, ponds, glaciers > 1 km^{2} (0.386 sq mi or 247 acres) and river estuaries.

Blicourt (French pronunciation: [blikuʁ]) is a commune in the Oise department in northern France.

== Population ==
Historical population
Year	Pop.	±% p.a.
1968	225	—
1975	237	+0.75%
1982	234	−0.18%
1990	271	+1.85%
1999	281	+0.40%
2007	321	+1.68%
2012	320	−0.06%
2017	349	+1.75%
2023	356	+0.33%
Source: INSEE

== See also ==
- Communes of the Oise department
