= Villers-sur-Auchy =

- Commune
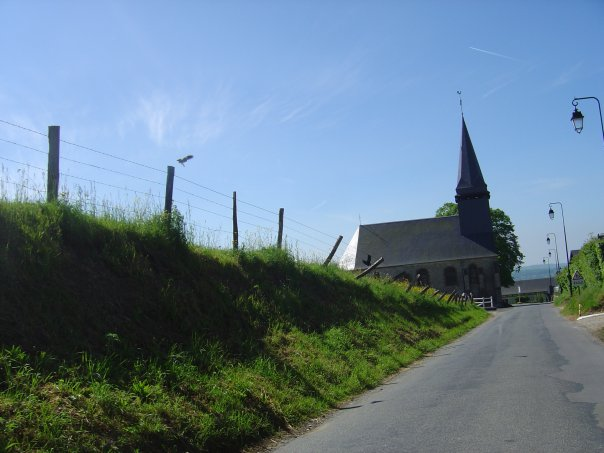
- The church in Villers-sur-Auchy
- Location of Villers-sur-Auchy
- Location within France Location within Hauts-de-France
- Coordinates: 49°29′15″N 1°47′43″E
- Country: France
- Region: Hauts-de-France
- Department: Oise
- Arrondissement: Beauvais
- Canton: Grandvilliers
- Intercommunality: Pays de Bray

Government
  - Mayor (2020–2026): Pascale Mondon
- Area^{1}: 8.59 km^{2} (3.32 sq mi)
- Elevation: 180 m (590 ft)
- Highest elevation: 198 m (650 ft)
- Lowest elevation: 88 m (289 ft)
- Population (2023): 370
  - Density: 43/km^{2} (110/sq mi)
- Time zone: UTC+01:00 (CET)
  - Summer (DST): UTC+02:00 (CEST)
- INSEE/Postal code: 60687 /60650
- ^{1} French Land Register data, which excludes lakes, ponds, glaciers > 1 km^{2} (0.386 sq mi or 247 acres) and river estuaries.

Villers-sur-Auchy (French pronunciation: [vilɛʁ syʁ oʃi]) is a commune in the Oise department in northern France.

== See also ==
- Communes of the Oise department
