= Fontenay-Torcy =

- Commune
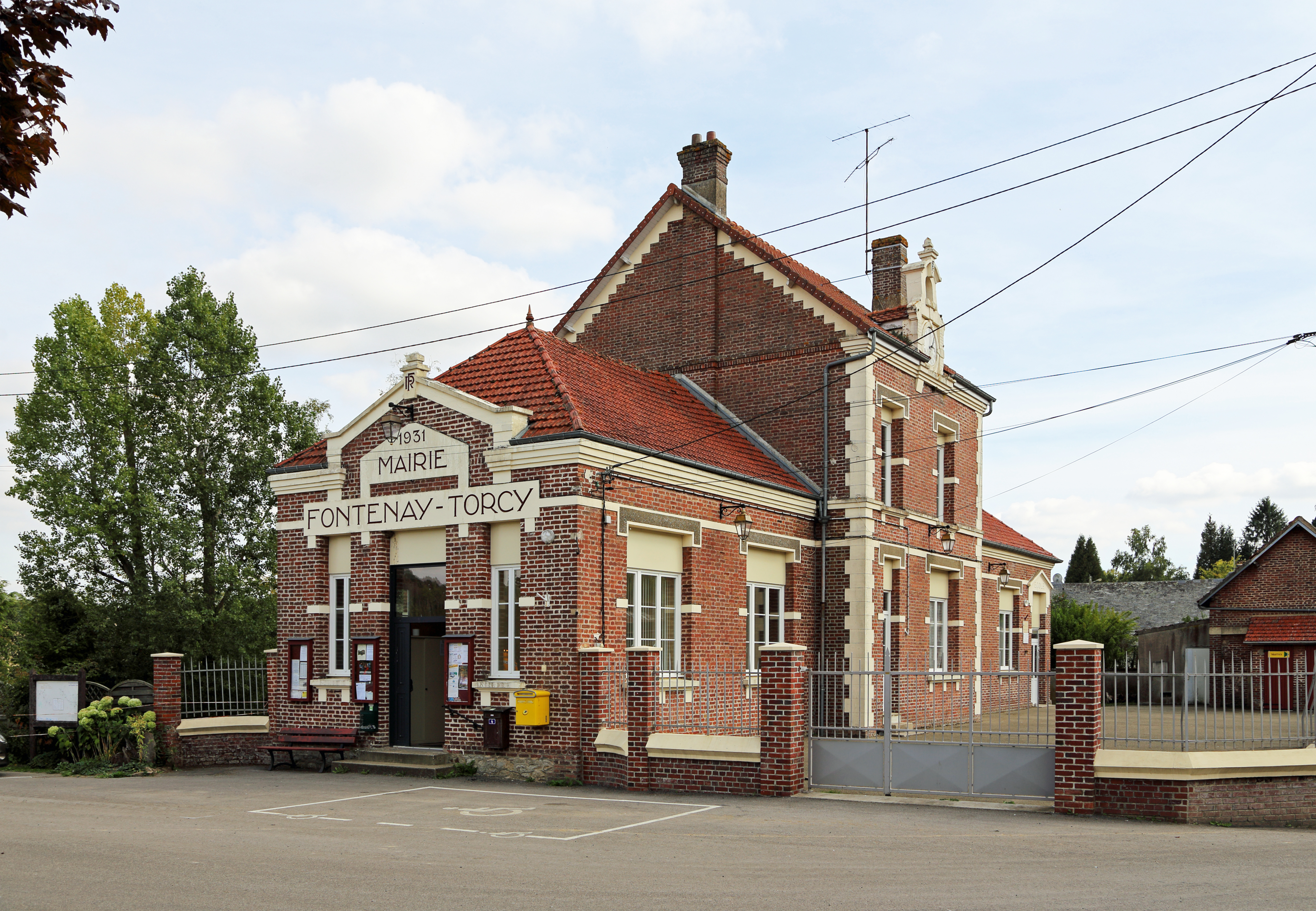
- The town hall in Fontenay-Torcy
- Location of Fontenay-Torcy
- Location within France Location within Hauts-de-France
- Coordinates: 49°34′08″N 1°46′14″E
- Country: France
- Region: Hauts-de-France
- Department: Oise
- Arrondissement: Beauvais
- Canton: Grandvilliers
- Intercommunality: Picardie Verte

Government
  - Mayor (2020–2026): Alain Bouteleux
- Area^{1}: 5.96 km^{2} (2.30 sq mi)
- Elevation: 220 m (720 ft)
- Highest elevation: 211 m (692 ft)
- Lowest elevation: 132 m (433 ft)
- Population (2023): 143
  - Density: 24.0/km^{2} (62.1/sq mi)
- Time zone: UTC+01:00 (CET)
  - Summer (DST): UTC+02:00 (CEST)
- INSEE/Postal code: 60244 /60380
- ^{1} French Land Register data, which excludes lakes, ponds, glaciers > 1 km^{2} (0.386 sq mi or 247 acres) and river estuaries.

Fontenay-Torcy (French pronunciation: [fɔ̃tnɛ tɔʁsi]) is a commune in the Oise department in northern France.

== See also ==
- Communes of the Oise department
