= Glatigny, Oise =

Glatigny
- Commune
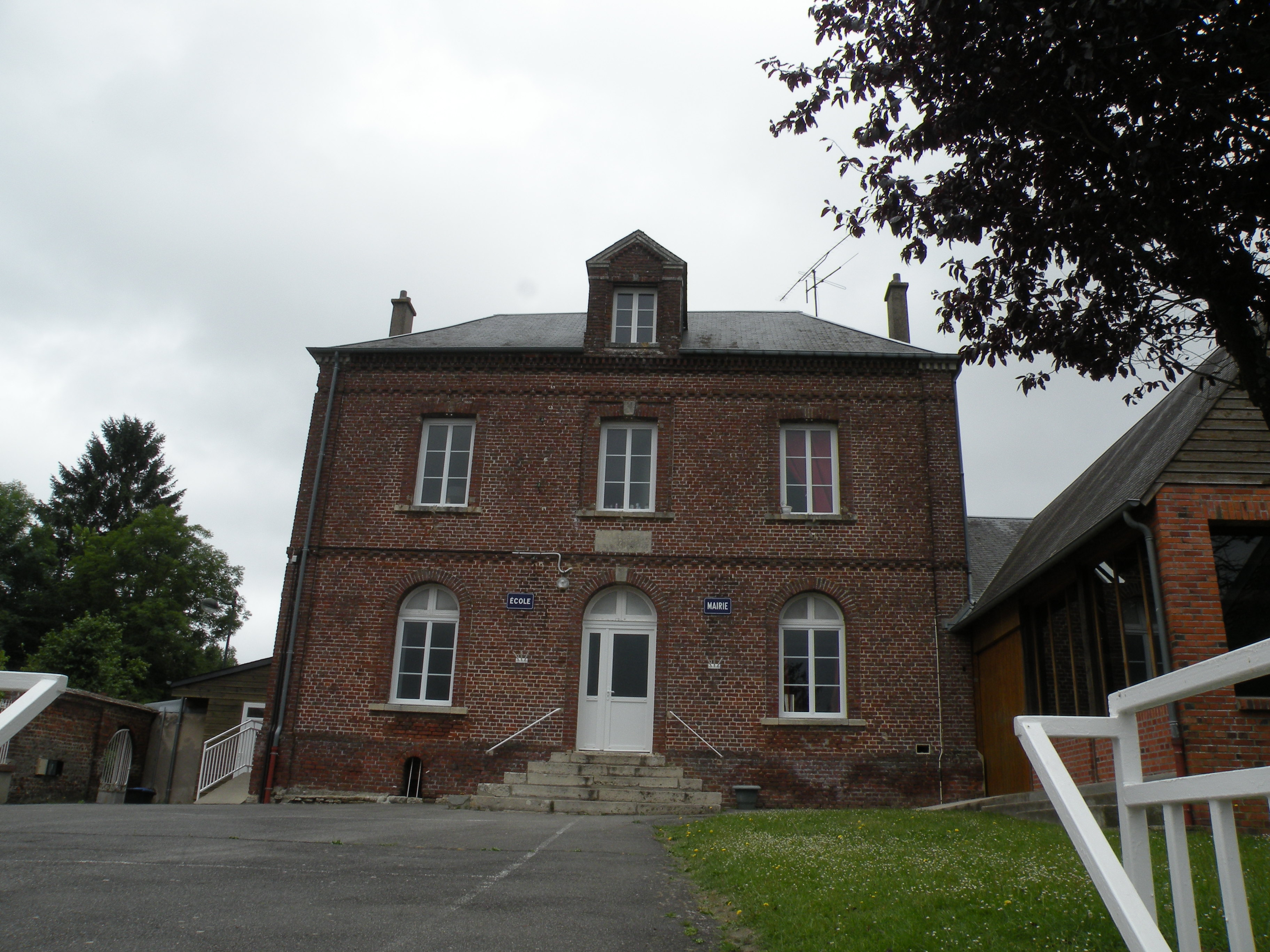
- The town hall in Glatigny
- Location of Glatigny
- Location within France Location within Hauts-de-France
- Coordinates: 49°29′53″N 1°53′43″E
- Country: France
- Region: Hauts-de-France
- Department: Oise
- Arrondissement: Beauvais
- Canton: Grandvilliers
- Intercommunality: Picardie Verte

Government
  - Mayor (2020–2026): Jean-Luc Blatier
- Area^{1}: 3.63 km^{2} (1.40 sq mi)
- Elevation: 195 m (640 ft)
- Highest elevation: 218 m (715 ft)
- Lowest elevation: 134 m (440 ft)
- Population (2023): 216
  - Density: 59.5/km^{2} (154/sq mi)
- Time zone: UTC+01:00 (CET)
  - Summer (DST): UTC+02:00 (CEST)
- INSEE/Postal code: 60275 /60650
- ^{1} French Land Register data, which excludes lakes, ponds, glaciers > 1 km^{2} (0.386 sq mi or 247 acres) and river estuaries.

Glatigny (French pronunciation: [ɡlatiɲi]) is a commune in the Oise department in northern France.

== See also ==
- Communes of the Oise department
