= Offoy, Oise =

Offoy
- Commune
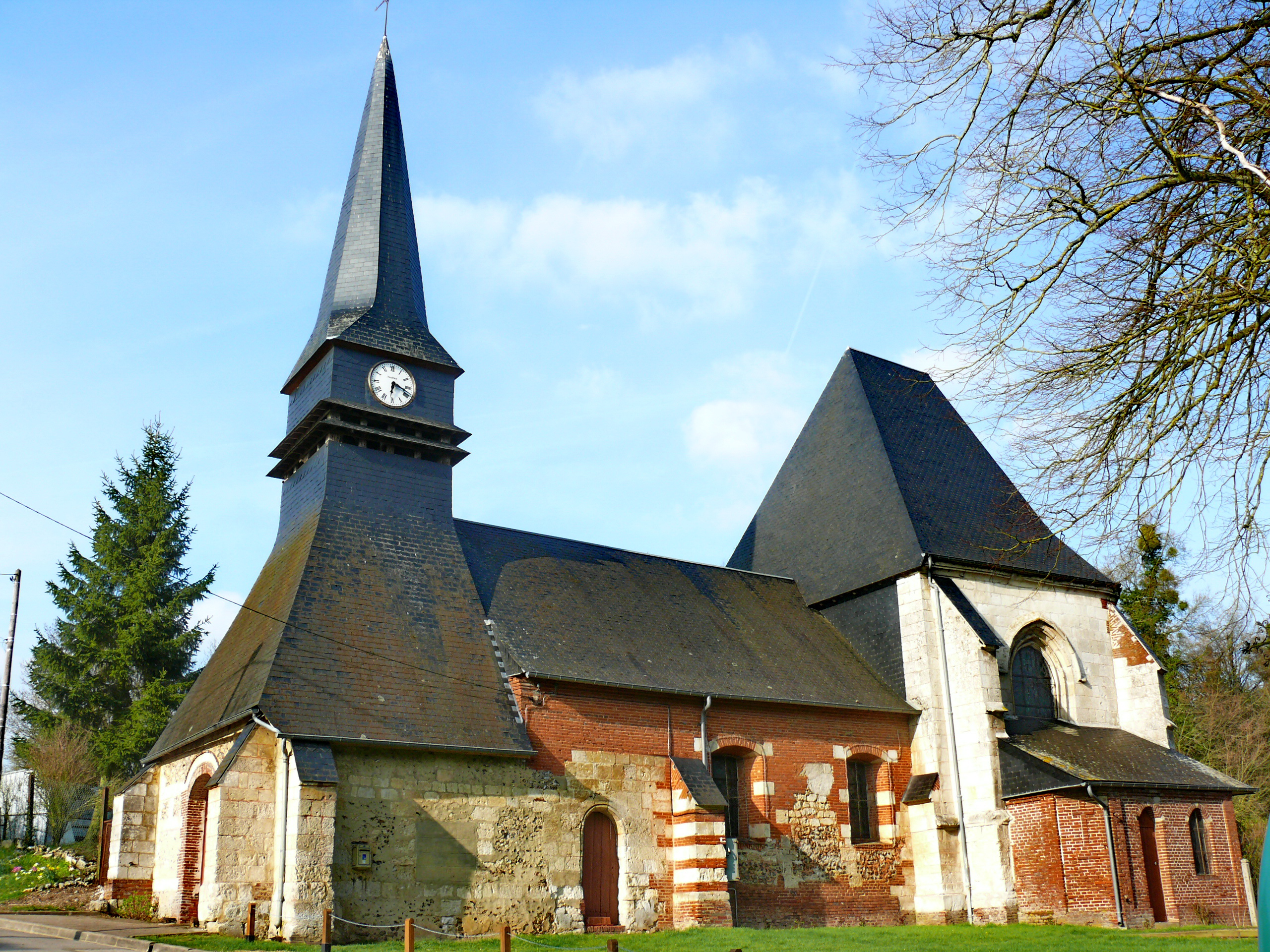
- The church in Offoy
- Location of Offoy
- Location within France Location within Hauts-de-France
- Coordinates: 49°41′50″N 2°02′18″E
- Country: France
- Region: Hauts-de-France
- Department: Oise
- Arrondissement: Beauvais
- Canton: Grandvilliers
- Intercommunality: Picardie Verte

Government
  - Mayor (2020–2026): Virginie Berquier
- Area^{1}: 4.2 km^{2} (1.6 sq mi)
- Elevation: 175 m (574 ft)
- Highest elevation: 182 m (597 ft)
- Lowest elevation: 113 m (371 ft)
- Population (2023): 109
  - Density: 26/km^{2} (67/sq mi)
- Time zone: UTC+01:00 (CET)
  - Summer (DST): UTC+02:00 (CEST)
- INSEE/Postal code: 60472 /60210
- ^{1} French Land Register data, which excludes lakes, ponds, glaciers > 1 km^{2} (0.386 sq mi or 247 acres) and river estuaries.

Offoy (French pronunciation: [ɔfwa]) is a commune in the Oise department in northern France.

== See also ==
- Communes of the Oise department
