= Quincampoix-Fleuzy =

- Commune
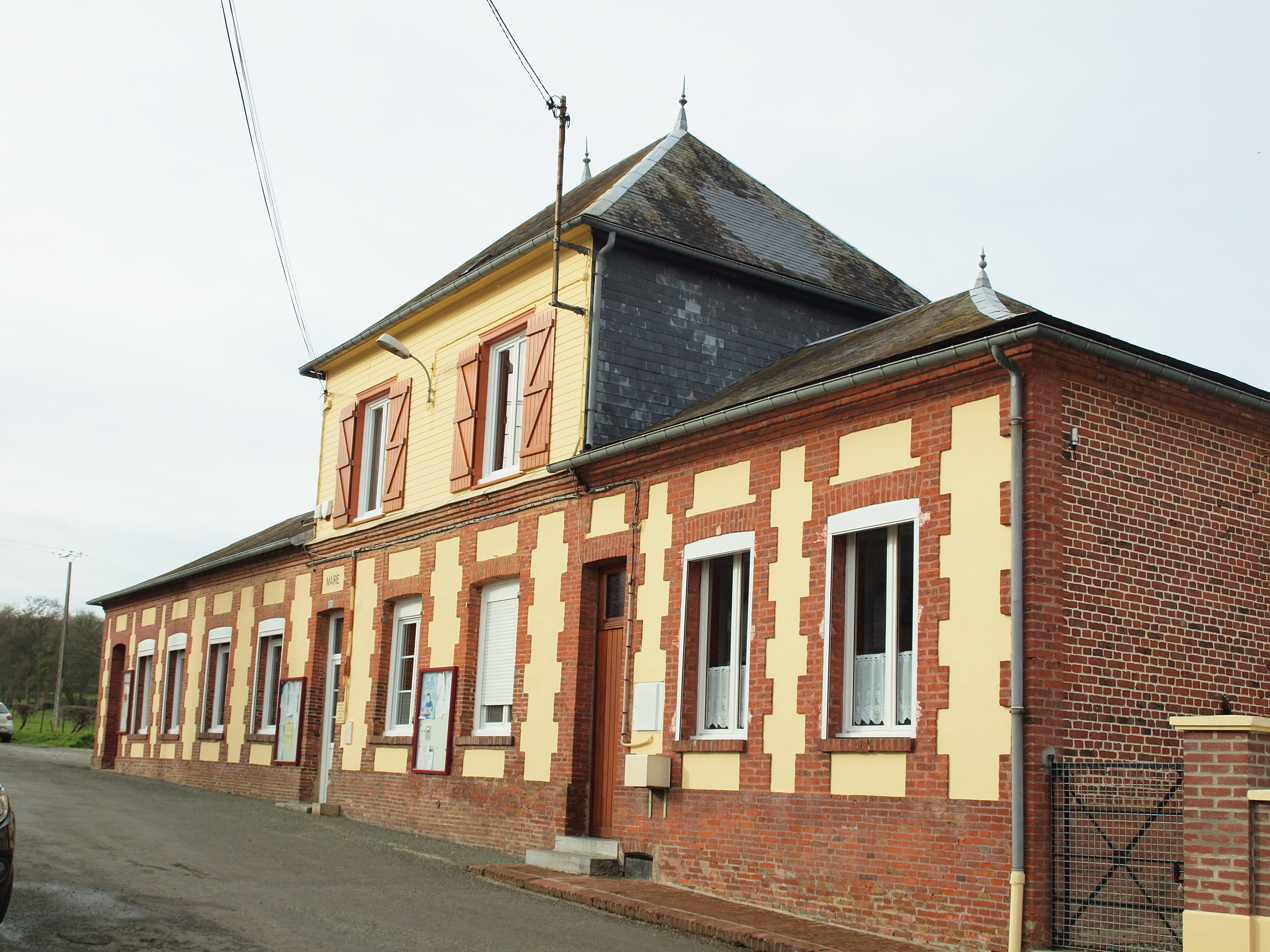
- The town hall in Quincampoix-Fleuzy
- Location of Quincampoix-Fleuzy
- Location within France Location within Hauts-de-France
- Coordinates: 49°44′50″N 1°46′25″E
- Country: France
- Region: Hauts-de-France
- Department: Oise
- Arrondissement: Beauvais
- Canton: Grandvilliers
- Intercommunality: Picardie Verte

Government
  - Mayor (2020–2026): Yves Beaurain
- Area^{1}: 9.22 km^{2} (3.56 sq mi)
- Highest elevation: 213 m (699 ft)
- Lowest elevation: 122 m (400 ft)
- Population (2023): 410
  - Density: 44/km^{2} (120/sq mi)
- Time zone: UTC+01:00 (CET)
  - Summer (DST): UTC+02:00 (CEST)
- INSEE/Postal code: 60521 /60220
- ^{1} French Land Register data, which excludes lakes, ponds, glaciers > 1 km^{2} (0.386 sq mi or 247 acres) and river estuaries.

Quincampoix-Fleuzy (French pronunciation: [kɛ̃kɑ̃pwa fløzi]) is a commune in the Oise department in northern France.

== See also ==
- Communes of the Oise department
