= Hodenc-en-Bray =

- Commune
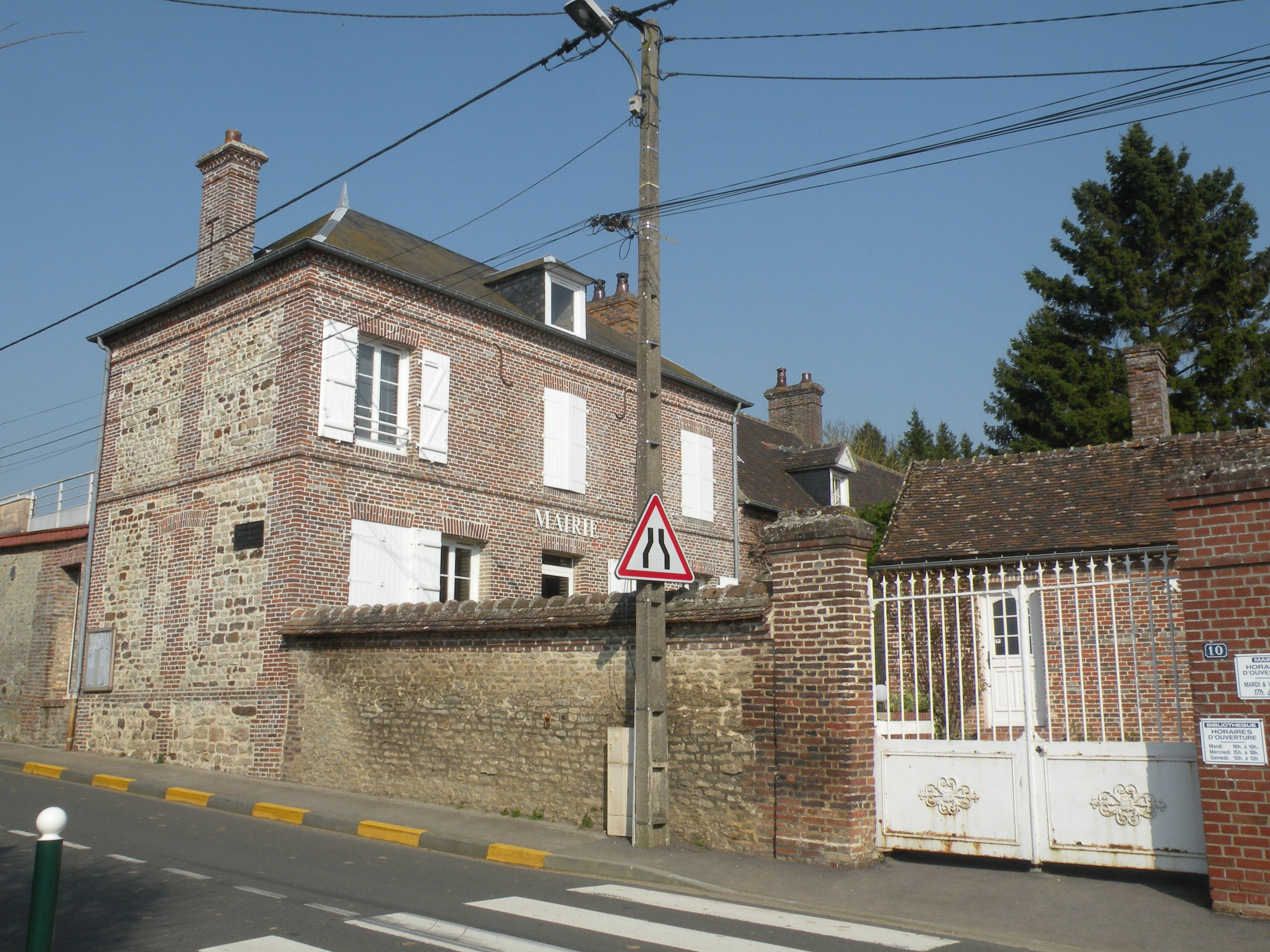
- The town hall in Hodenc-en-Bray
- Location of Hodenc-en-Bray
- Location within France Location within Hauts-de-France
- Coordinates: 49°28′05″N 1°53′56″E
- Country: France
- Region: Hauts-de-France
- Department: Oise
- Arrondissement: Beauvais
- Canton: Grandvilliers
- Intercommunality: Pays de Bray

Government
  - Mayor (2020–2026): Frederic Langlois
- Area^{1}: 9.94 km^{2} (3.84 sq mi)
- Elevation: 178 m (584 ft)
- Highest elevation: 206 m (676 ft)
- Lowest elevation: 98 m (322 ft)
- Population (2023): 478
  - Density: 48.1/km^{2} (125/sq mi)
- Time zone: UTC+01:00 (CET)
  - Summer (DST): UTC+02:00 (CEST)
- INSEE/Postal code: 60315 /60650
- ^{1} French Land Register data, which excludes lakes, ponds, glaciers > 1 km^{2} (0.386 sq mi or 247 acres) and river estuaries.

Hodenc-en-Bray is a commune in the Oise department in northern France.

== See also ==
- Communes of the Oise department
