= Laverrière =

- Commune
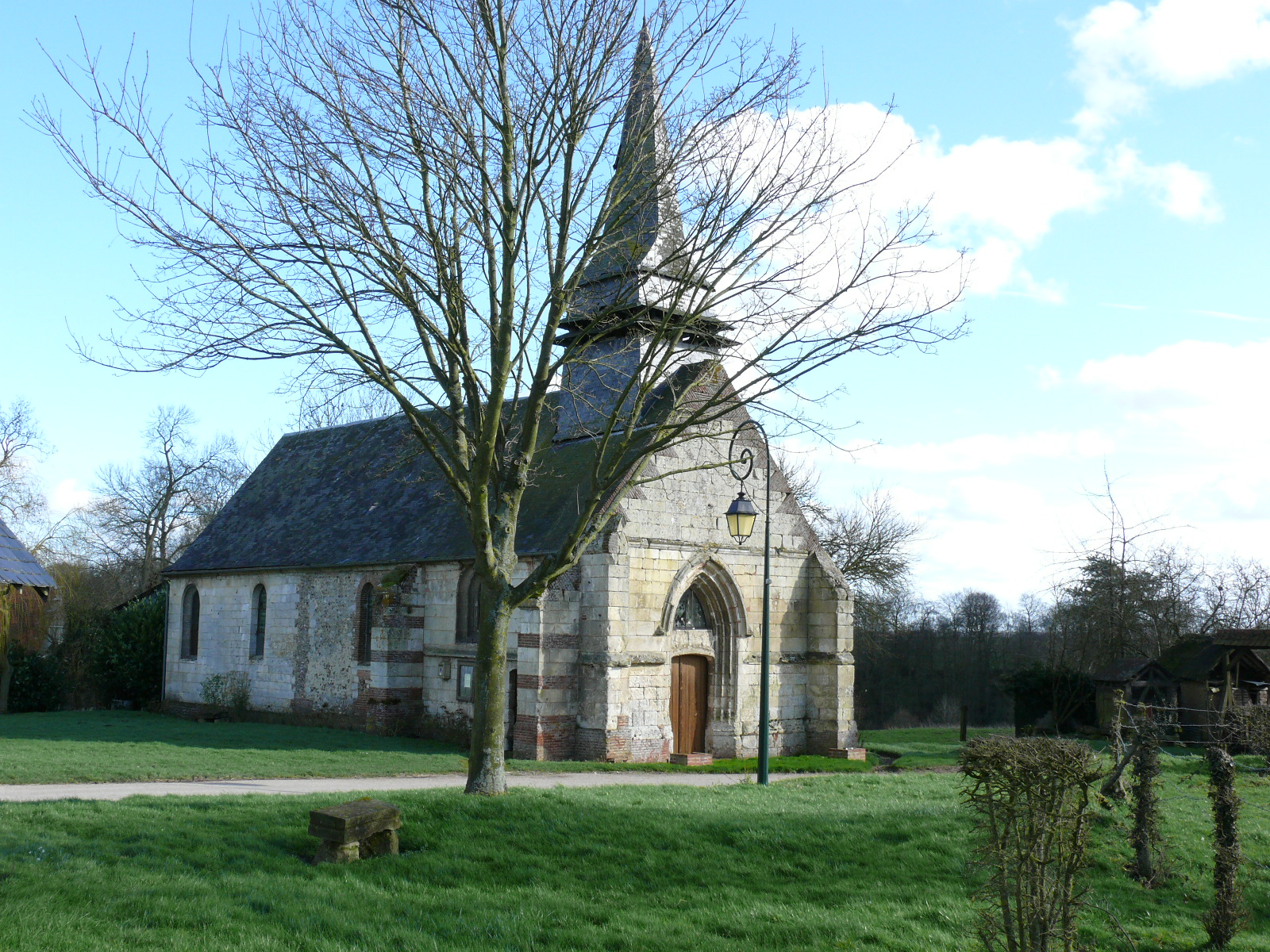
- The church in Laverrière
- Location of Laverrière
- Location within France Location within Hauts-de-France
- Coordinates: 49°41′16″N 2°00′46″E
- Country: France
- Region: Hauts-de-France
- Department: Oise
- Arrondissement: Beauvais
- Canton: Grandvilliers
- Intercommunality: Picardie Verte

Government
  - Mayor (2020–2026): Philippe Verschuere
- Area^{1}: 3.74 km^{2} (1.44 sq mi)
- Elevation: 80 m (260 ft)
- Highest elevation: 182 m (597 ft)
- Lowest elevation: 130 m (430 ft)
- Population (2023): 32
  - Density: 8.6/km^{2} (22/sq mi)
- Time zone: UTC+01:00 (CET)
  - Summer (DST): UTC+02:00 (CEST)
- INSEE/Postal code: 60354 /60210
- ^{1} French Land Register data, which excludes lakes, ponds, glaciers > 1 km^{2} (0.386 sq mi or 247 acres) and river estuaries.

Laverrière (French pronunciation: [lavɛʁjɛʁ]) is a commune in the Oise department in northern France.

== See also ==
- Communes of the Oise department
