= Oudeuil =

- Commune
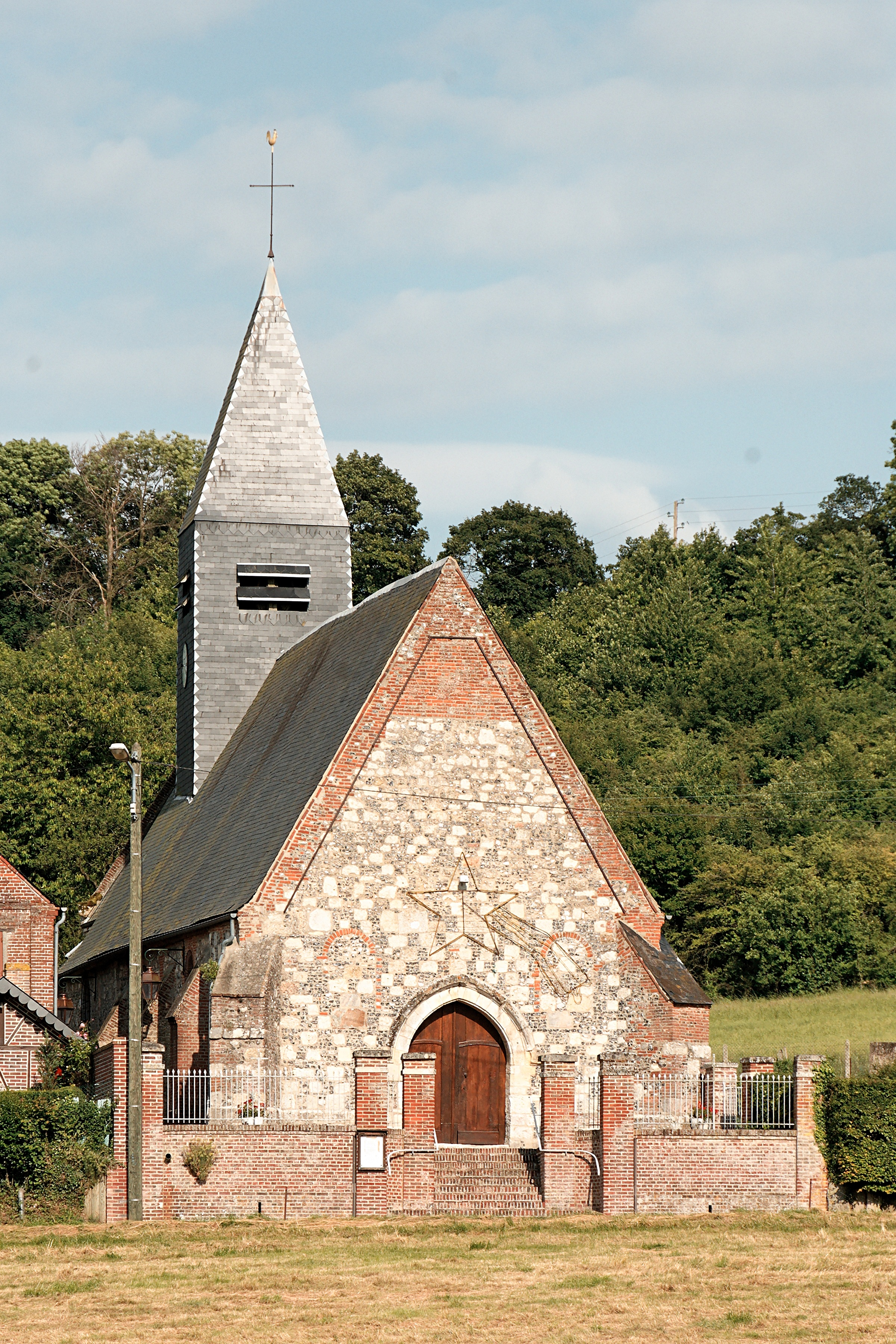
- The church in Oudeuil
- Location of Oudeuil
- Location within France Location within Hauts-de-France
- Coordinates: 49°32′56″N 2°01′42″E
- Country: France
- Region: Hauts-de-France
- Department: Oise
- Arrondissement: Beauvais
- Canton: Grandvilliers
- Intercommunality: Picardie Verte

Government
  - Mayor (2020–2026): Philippe Sys
- Area^{1}: 6.08 km^{2} (2.35 sq mi)
- Elevation: 116 m (381 ft)
- Highest elevation: 180 m (590 ft)
- Lowest elevation: 97 m (318 ft)
- Population (2023): 293
  - Density: 48.2/km^{2} (125/sq mi)
- Time zone: UTC+01:00 (CET)
  - Summer (DST): UTC+02:00 (CEST)
- INSEE/Postal code: 60484 /60860
- ^{1} French Land Register data, which excludes lakes, ponds, glaciers > 1 km^{2} (0.386 sq mi or 247 acres) and river estuaries.

Oudeuil (French pronunciation: [udœj]) is a commune in the Oise department in northern France.

== See also ==
- Communes of the Oise department
