= Halloy, Oise =

Halloy
- Commune
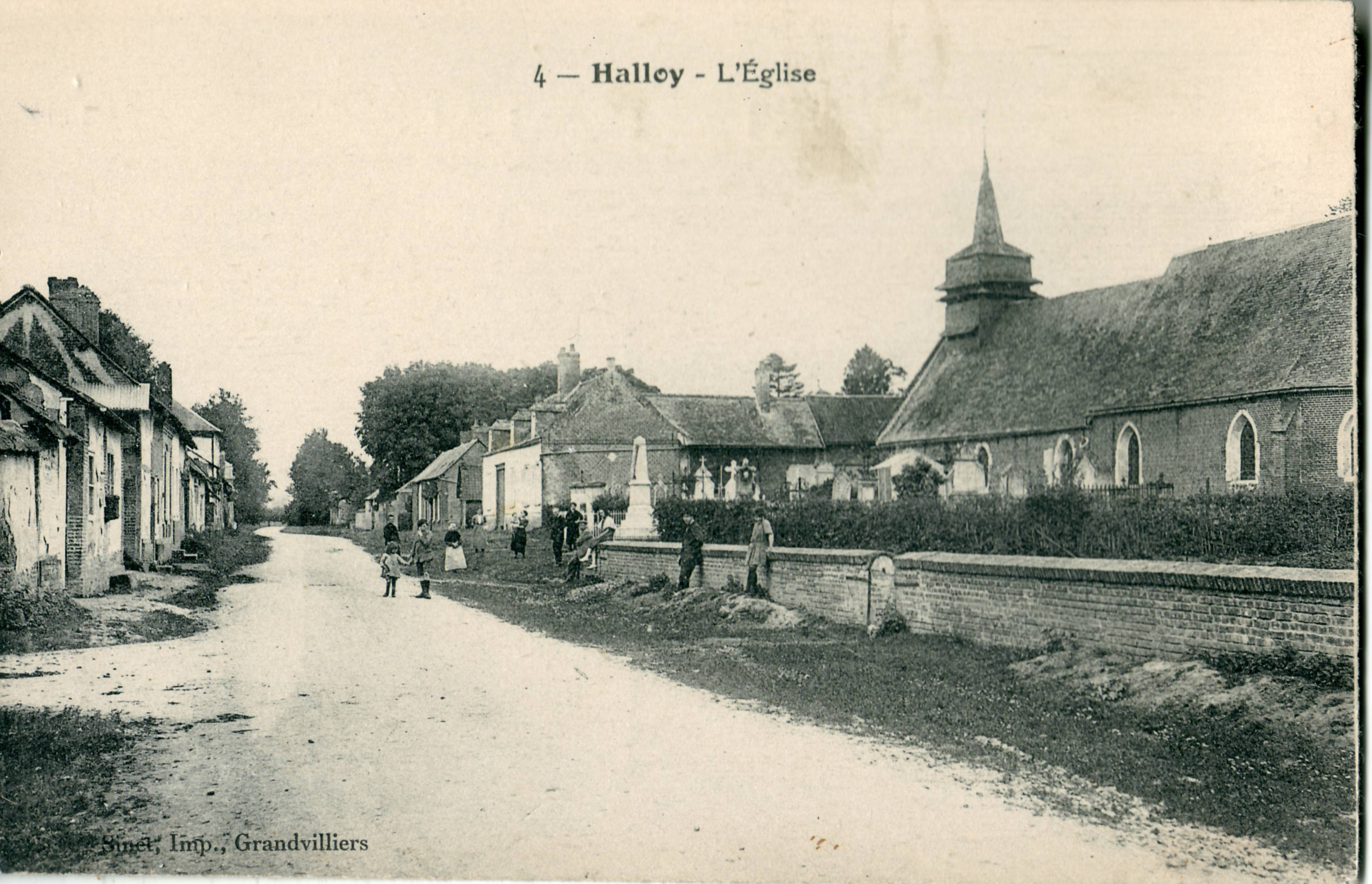
- The church in Halloy
- Location of Halloy
- Location within France Location within Hauts-de-France
- Coordinates: 49°39′15″N 1°56′29″E
- Country: France
- Region: Hauts-de-France
- Department: Oise
- Arrondissement: Beauvais
- Canton: Grandvilliers
- Intercommunality: Picardie Verte

Government
  - Mayor (2020–2026): Gilles Boyenval
- Area^{1}: 3.84 km^{2} (1.48 sq mi)
- Elevation: 194 m (636 ft)
- Highest elevation: 204 m (669 ft)
- Lowest elevation: 187 m (614 ft)
- Population (2023): 438
  - Density: 114/km^{2} (295/sq mi)
- Time zone: UTC+01:00 (CET)
  - Summer (DST): UTC+02:00 (CEST)
- INSEE/Postal code: 60295 /60210
- ^{1} French Land Register data, which excludes lakes, ponds, glaciers > 1 km^{2} (0.386 sq mi or 247 acres) and river estuaries.

Halloy (French pronunciation: [alwa]) is a commune in the Oise department in northern France.

== See also ==
- Communes of the Oise department
