= Haucourt =

Haucourt is the name or part of the name of several communes in France:

- Haucourt, Oise, in the Oise department
- Haucourt, Pas-de-Calais, in the Pas-de-Calais department
- Haucourt, Seine-Maritime, in the Seine-Maritime department
- Haucourt-en-Cambrésis, in the Nord department
- Haucourt-Moulaine, in the Meurthe-et-Moselle department
