= Escames =

- Commune
- Location of Escames
- Location within France Location within Hauts-de-France
- Coordinates: 49°33′15″N 1°48′05″E
- Country: France
- Region: Hauts-de-France
- Department: Oise
- Arrondissement: Beauvais
- Canton: Grandvilliers
- Intercommunality: Picardie Verte

Government
  - Mayor (2020–2026): Béatrice Belliard
- Area^{1}: 11.68 km^{2} (4.51 sq mi)
- Elevation: 125 m (410 ft)
- Highest elevation: 217 m (712 ft)
- Lowest elevation: 115 m (377 ft)
- Population (2023): 226
  - Density: 19.3/km^{2} (50.1/sq mi)
- Time zone: UTC+01:00 (CET)
  - Summer (DST): UTC+02:00 (CEST)
- INSEE/Postal code: 60217 /60380
- ^{1} French Land Register data, which excludes lakes, ponds, glaciers > 1 km^{2} (0.386 sq mi or 247 acres) and river estuaries.

Escames (French pronunciation: [ɛskam]) is a commune in the Oise department in northern France.

== See also ==
- Communes of the Oise department
