= Bouvresse =

- Commune
- Location of Bouvresse
- Location within France Location within Hauts-de-France
- Coordinates: 49°39′12″N 1°45′21″E
- Country: France
- Region: Hauts-de-France
- Department: Oise
- Arrondissement: Beauvais
- Canton: Grandvilliers
- Intercommunality: Picardie Verte

Government
  - Mayor (2020–2026): Fabrice Loncke
- Area^{1}: 2.8 km^{2} (1.1 sq mi)
- Elevation: 223 m (732 ft)
- Highest elevation: 226 m (741 ft)
- Lowest elevation: 211 m (692 ft)
- Population (2023): 170
  - Density: 61/km^{2} (160/sq mi)
- Time zone: UTC+01:00 (CET)
  - Summer (DST): UTC+02:00 (CEST)
- INSEE/Postal code: 60098 /60220
- ^{1} French Land Register data, which excludes lakes, ponds, glaciers > 1 km^{2} (0.386 sq mi or 247 acres) and river estuaries.

Bouvresse (French pronunciation: [buvʁɛs]) is a commune in the Oise department in northern France.

== Population ==
Historical population
Year	Pop.	±% p.a.
1968	171	—
1975	172	+0.08%
1982	143	−2.60%
1990	153	+0.85%
1999	164	+0.77%
2007	162	−0.15%
2012	180	+2.13%
2017	160	−2.33%
2023	170	+1.02%
Source: INSEE

== See also ==
- Communes of the Oise department
