= Sarnois =

- Commune
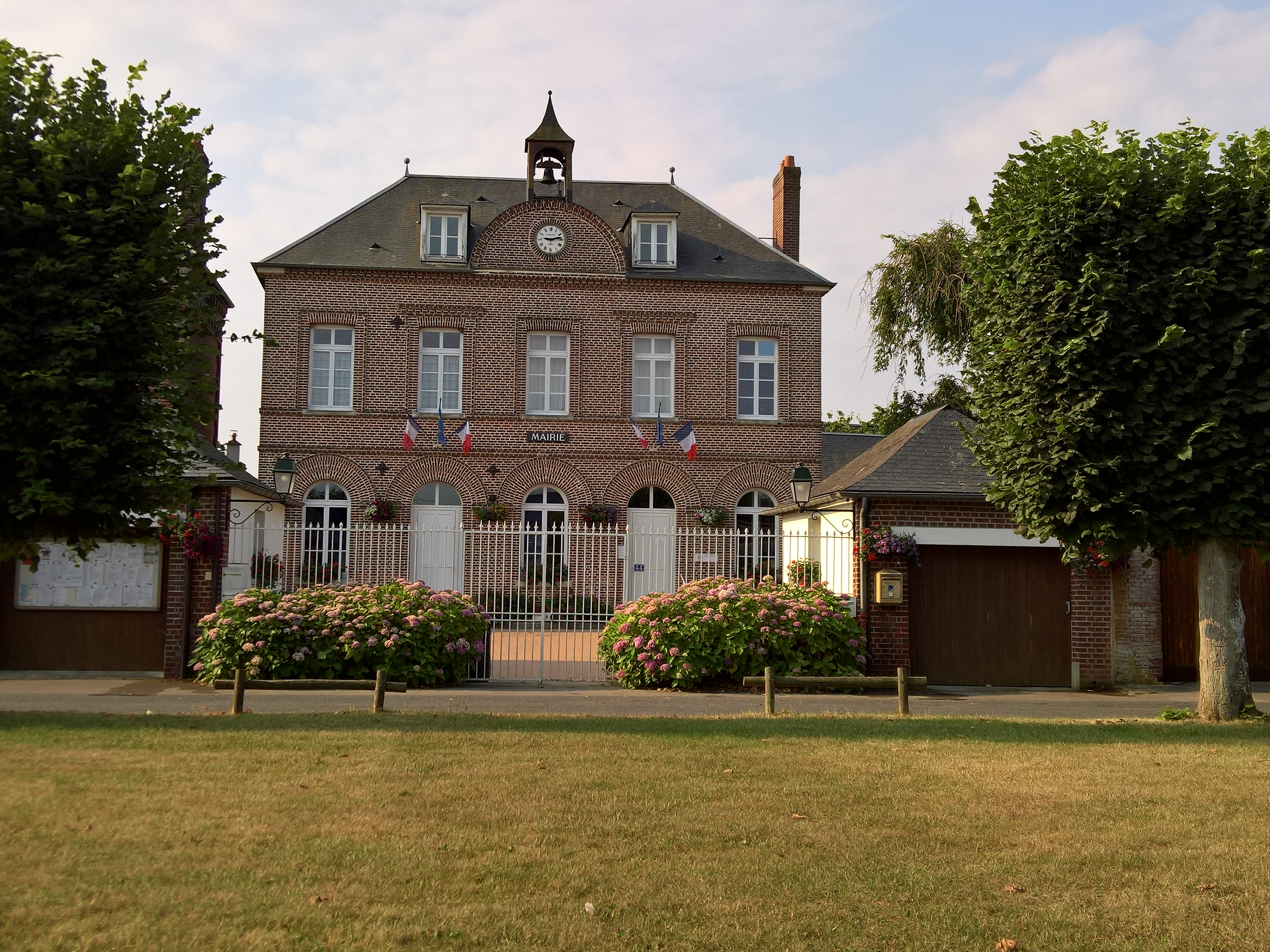
- The town hall in Sarnois
- Location of Sarnois
- Location within France Location within Hauts-de-France
- Coordinates: 49°40′46″N 1°55′07″E
- Country: France
- Region: Hauts-de-France
- Department: Oise
- Arrondissement: Beauvais
- Canton: Grandvilliers
- Intercommunality: Picardie Verte

Government
  - Mayor (2020–2026): Lionel Bouchart
- Area^{1}: 5.56 km^{2} (2.15 sq mi)
- Elevation: 190 m (620 ft)
- Highest elevation: 201 m (659 ft)
- Lowest elevation: 182 m (597 ft)
- Population (2023): 351
  - Density: 63.1/km^{2} (164/sq mi)
- Time zone: UTC+01:00 (CET)
  - Summer (DST): UTC+02:00 (CEST)
- INSEE/Postal code: 60605 /60210
- ^{1} French Land Register data, which excludes lakes, ponds, glaciers > 1 km^{2} (0.386 sq mi or 247 acres) and river estuaries.

Sarnois (French pronunciation: [saʁnwa]) is a commune in the Oise department in northern France.

== Population ==
Historical population
Year	Pop.	±% p.a.
1968	260	—
1975	241	−1.08%
1982	230	−0.67%
1990	216	−0.78%
1999	235	+0.94%
2007	302	+3.19%
2012	334	+2.03%
2017	348	+0.82%
2023	351	+0.14%
Source: INSEE

== See also ==
- Communes of the Oise department
