= Escles-Saint-Pierre =

- Commune
- Location of Escles-Saint-Pierre
- Location within France Location within Hauts-de-France
- Coordinates: 49°44′30″N 1°48′15″E
- Country: France
- Region: Hauts-de-France
- Department: Oise
- Arrondissement: Beauvais
- Canton: Grandvilliers
- Intercommunality: Picardie Verte

Government
  - Mayor (2020–2026): Sabrina Renault
- Area^{1}: 3.37 km^{2} (1.30 sq mi)
- Elevation: 200 m (660 ft)
- Highest elevation: 216 m (709 ft)
- Lowest elevation: 170 m (560 ft)
- Population (2023): 176
  - Density: 52.2/km^{2} (135/sq mi)
- Time zone: UTC+01:00 (CET)
  - Summer (DST): UTC+02:00 (CEST)
- INSEE/Postal code: 60219 /60220
- ^{1} French Land Register data, which excludes lakes, ponds, glaciers > 1 km^{2} (0.386 sq mi or 247 acres) and river estuaries.

Escles-Saint-Pierre is a commune in the Oise department in northern France.

== See also ==
- Communes of the Oise department
