= Le Mesnil-Conteville =

- Commune
- Location of Le Mesnil-Conteville
- Location within France Location within Hauts-de-France
- Coordinates: 49°40′12″N 2°03′38″E
- Country: France
- Region: Hauts-de-France
- Department: Oise
- Arrondissement: Beauvais
- Canton: Grandvilliers
- Intercommunality: Picardie Verte

Government
  - Mayor (2020–2026): Edmond Gaquerel
- Area^{1}: 3.49 km^{2} (1.35 sq mi)
- Elevation: 173 m (568 ft)
- Highest elevation: 179 m (587 ft)
- Lowest elevation: 115 m (377 ft)
- Population (2023): 66
  - Density: 19/km^{2} (49/sq mi)
- Time zone: UTC+01:00 (CET)
  - Summer (DST): UTC+02:00 (CEST)
- INSEE/Postal code: 60397 /60210
- ^{1} French Land Register data, which excludes lakes, ponds, glaciers > 1 km^{2} (0.386 sq mi or 247 acres) and river estuaries.

Le Mesnil-Conteville (French pronunciation: [lə mɛnil kɔ̃tvil]) is a commune in the Oise department in northern France.

== See also ==
- Communes of the Oise department
