= Fontaine-Lavaganne =

- Commune
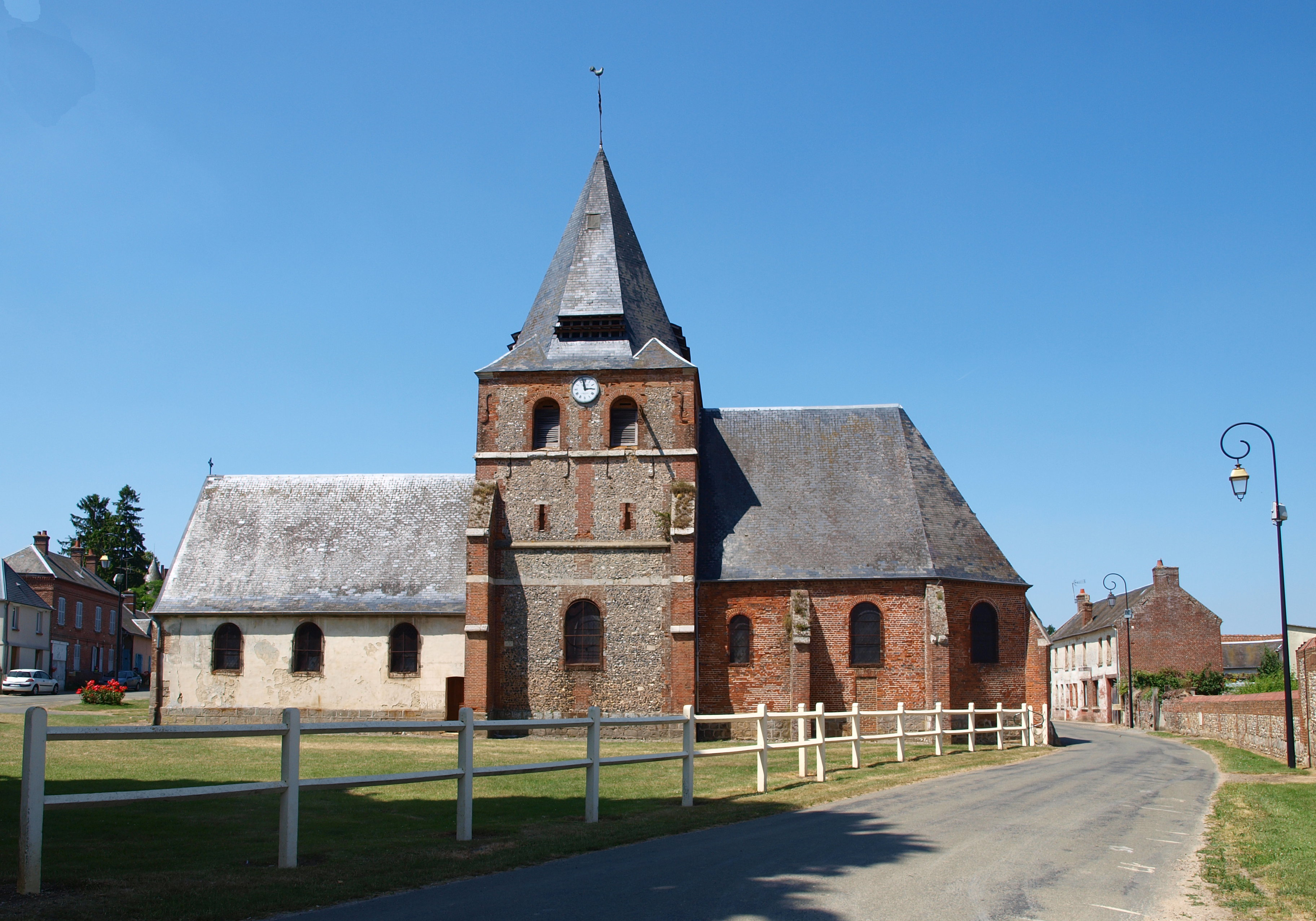
- The church in Fontaine-Lavaganne
- Location of Fontaine-Lavaganne
- Location within France Location within Hauts-de-France
- Coordinates: 49°35′57″N 1°57′20″E
- Country: France
- Region: Hauts-de-France
- Department: Oise
- Arrondissement: Beauvais
- Canton: Grandvilliers
- Intercommunality: Picardie Verte

Government
  - Mayor (2020–2026): Gérard Goret
- Area^{1}: 6.76 km^{2} (2.61 sq mi)
- Elevation: 134 m (440 ft)
- Highest elevation: 186 m (610 ft)
- Lowest elevation: 115 m (377 ft)
- Population (2023): 502
  - Density: 74.3/km^{2} (192/sq mi)
- Time zone: UTC+01:00 (CET)
  - Summer (DST): UTC+02:00 (CEST)
- INSEE/Postal code: 60242 /60690
- ^{1} French Land Register data, which excludes lakes, ponds, glaciers > 1 km^{2} (0.386 sq mi or 247 acres) and river estuaries.

Fontaine-Lavaganne (French pronunciation: [fɔ̃tɛn lavaɡan]) is a commune in the Oise department in northern France.

== See also ==
- Communes of the Oise department
