= Buicourt =

- Commune
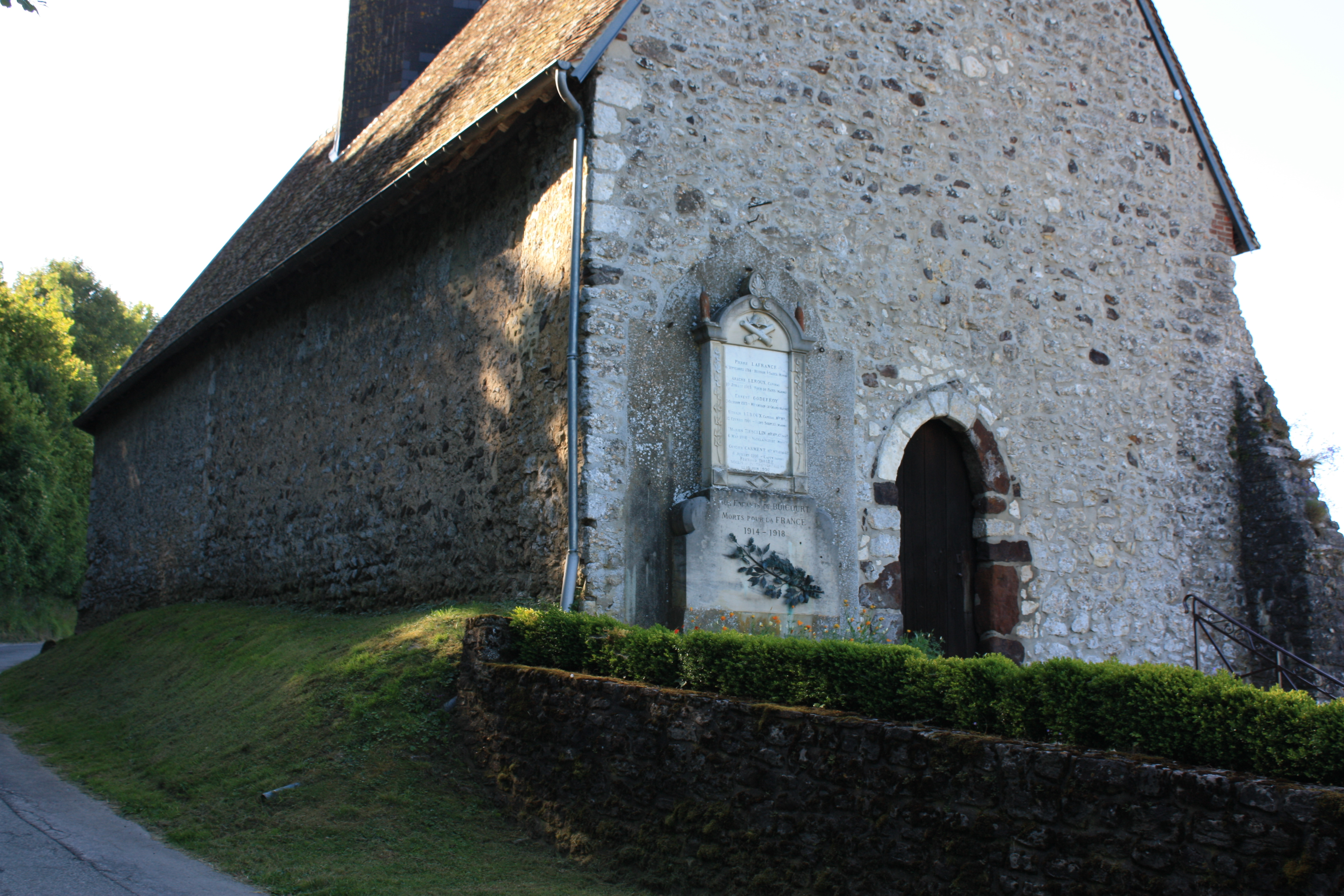
- The church in Buicourt
- Location of Buicourt
- Location within France Location within Hauts-de-France
- Coordinates: 49°32′26″N 1°49′12″E
- Country: France
- Region: Hauts-de-France
- Department: Oise
- Arrondissement: Beauvais
- Canton: Grandvilliers
- Intercommunality: Picardie Verte

Government
  - Mayor (2020–2026): Francis Folastre
- Area^{1}: 3.51 km^{2} (1.36 sq mi)
- Elevation: 230 m (750 ft)
- Highest elevation: 211 m (692 ft)
- Lowest elevation: 128 m (420 ft)
- Population (2023): 143
  - Density: 40.7/km^{2} (106/sq mi)
- Time zone: UTC+01:00 (CET)
  - Summer (DST): UTC+02:00 (CEST)
- INSEE/Postal code: 60114 /60380
- ^{1} French Land Register data, which excludes lakes, ponds, glaciers > 1 km^{2} (0.386 sq mi or 247 acres) and river estuaries.

Buicourt (French pronunciation: [bɥikuʁ]) is a commune in the Oise department in northern France.

== Population ==
Historical population
Year	Pop.	±% p.a.
1968	117	—
1975	105	−1.53%
1982	107	+0.27%
1990	127	+2.17%
1999	146	+1.56%
2007	140	−0.52%
2012	137	−0.43%
2017	145	+1.14%
2023	143	−0.23%
Source: INSEE

== See also ==
- Communes of the Oise department
