= Loueuse =

- Commune
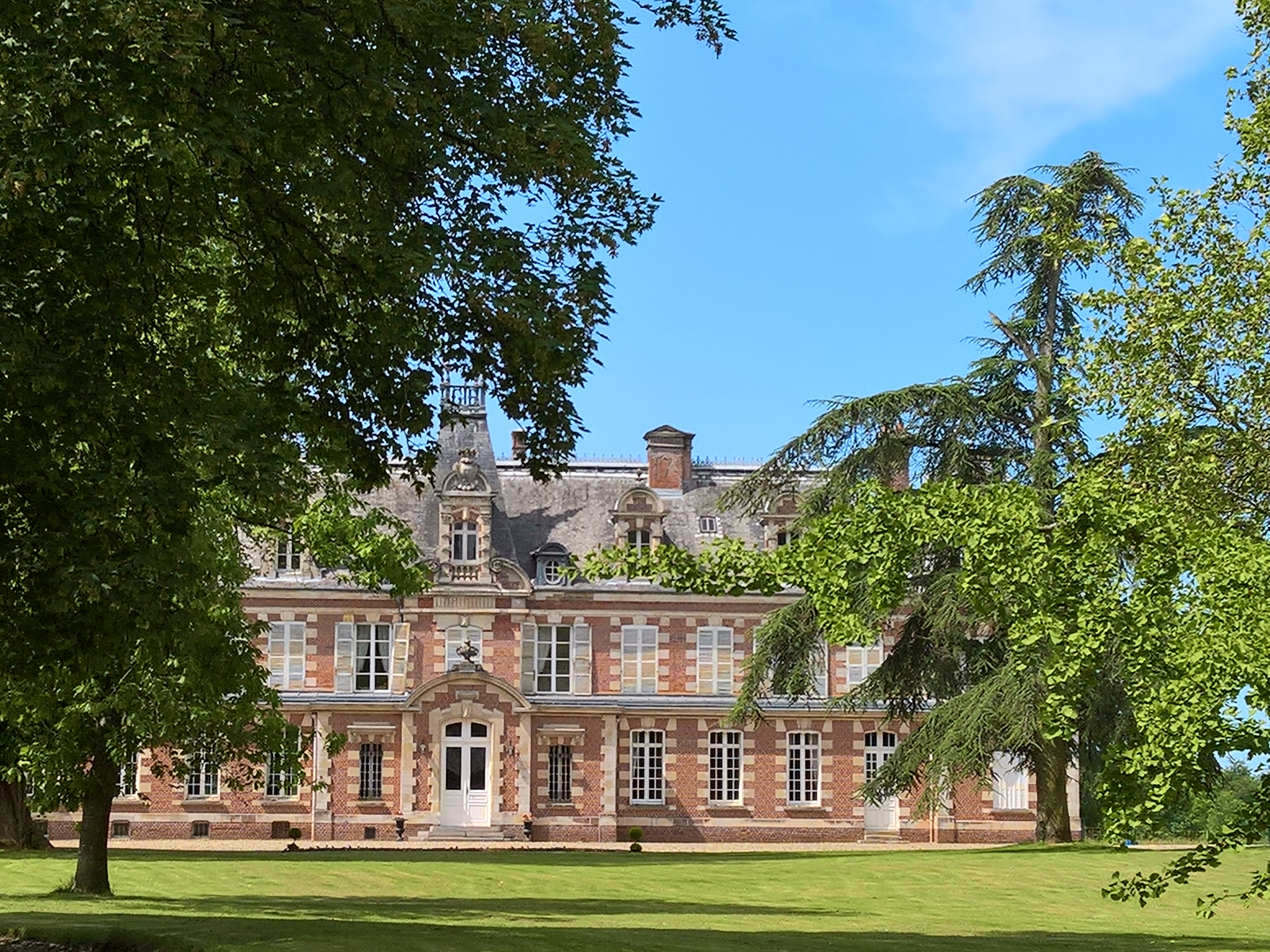
- The chateau in Loueuse
- Location of Loueuse
- Location within France Location within Hauts-de-France
- Coordinates: 49°35′59″N 1°49′34″E
- Country: France
- Region: Hauts-de-France
- Department: Oise
- Arrondissement: Beauvais
- Canton: Grandvilliers
- Intercommunality: Picardie Verte

Government
  - Mayor (2020–2026): Pierre des Courtils
- Area^{1}: 7.32 km^{2} (2.83 sq mi)
- Elevation: 192 m (630 ft)
- Highest elevation: 199 m (653 ft)
- Lowest elevation: 139 m (456 ft)
- Population (2023): 151
  - Density: 20.6/km^{2} (53.4/sq mi)
- Time zone: UTC+01:00 (CET)
  - Summer (DST): UTC+02:00 (CEST)
- INSEE/Postal code: 60371 /60380
- ^{1} French Land Register data, which excludes lakes, ponds, glaciers > 1 km^{2} (0.386 sq mi or 247 acres) and river estuaries.

Loueuse (French pronunciation: [lwøz]) is a commune in the Oise department in northern France.

== See also ==
- Communes of the Oise department
