= Lannoy-Cuillère =

- Commune
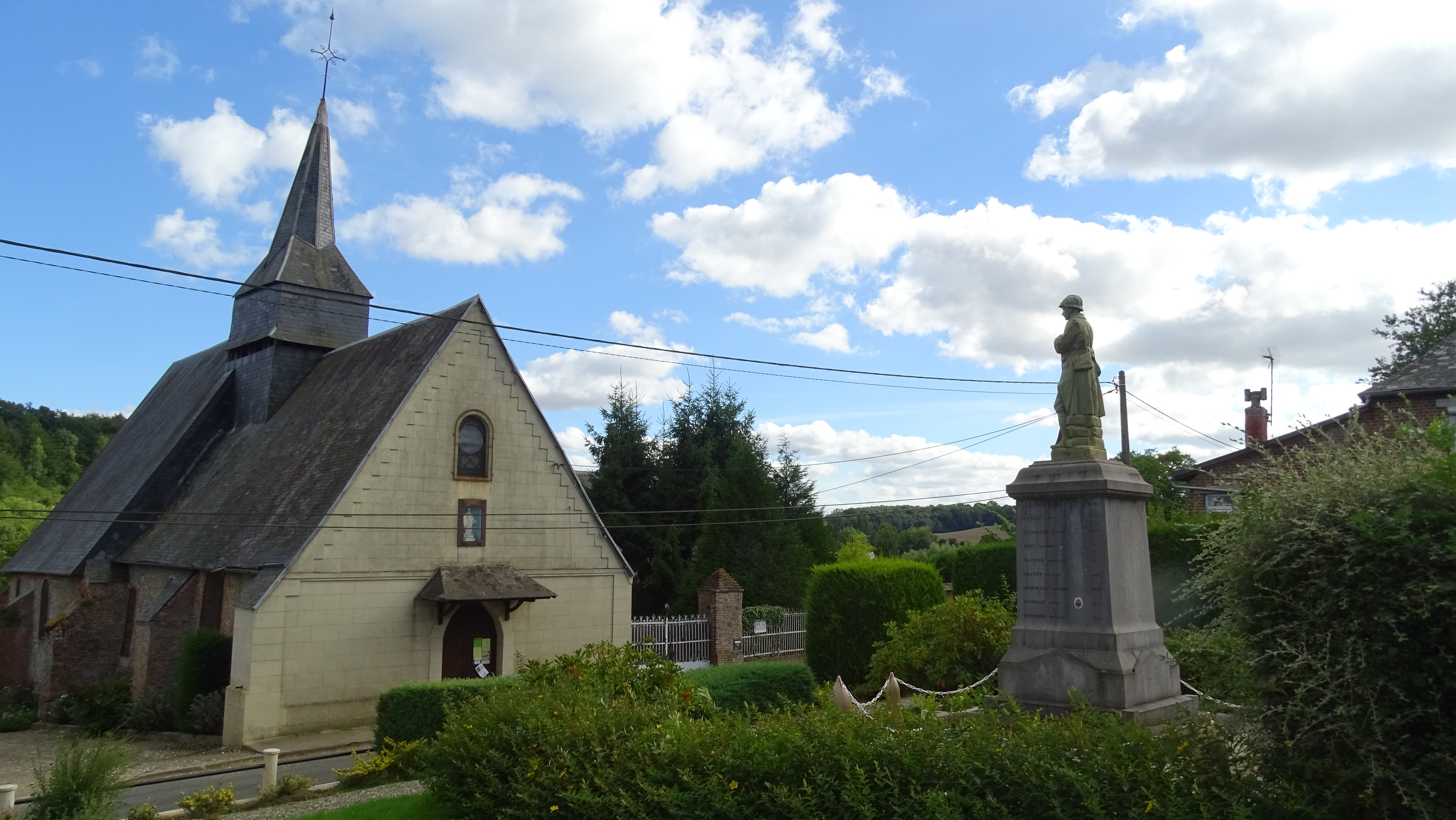
- The church in Lannoy-Cuillère
- Location of Lannoy-Cuillère
- Location within France Location within Hauts-de-France
- Coordinates: 49°42′31″N 1°44′55″E
- Country: France
- Region: Hauts-de-France
- Department: Oise
- Arrondissement: Beauvais
- Canton: Grandvilliers
- Intercommunality: Picardie Verte

Government
  - Mayor (2020–2026): Sylvie Van Overbeke
- Area^{1}: 14.98 km^{2} (5.78 sq mi)
- Elevation: 132 m (433 ft)
- Highest elevation: 229 m (751 ft)
- Lowest elevation: 142 m (466 ft)
- Population (2023): 278
  - Density: 18.6/km^{2} (48.1/sq mi)
- Time zone: UTC+01:00 (CET)
  - Summer (DST): UTC+02:00 (CEST)
- INSEE/Postal code: 60347 /60220
- ^{1} French Land Register data, which excludes lakes, ponds, glaciers > 1 km^{2} (0.386 sq mi or 247 acres) and river estuaries.

Lannoy-Cuillère (French pronunciation: [lanwa kɥijɛʁ]) is a Communes of France in the Oise department in northern France.

== See also ==
- Communes of the Oise department
