= Hautbos =

- Commune
- Location of Hautbos
- Location within France Location within Hauts-de-France
- Coordinates: 49°37′42″N 1°52′16″E
- Country: France
- Region: Hauts-de-France
- Department: Oise
- Arrondissement: Beauvais
- Canton: Grandvilliers
- Intercommunality: Picardie Verte

Government
  - Mayor (2020–2026): Marie-Laure Toutain
- Area^{1}: 4.3 km^{2} (1.7 sq mi)
- Elevation: 197 m (646 ft)
- Highest elevation: 197 m (646 ft)
- Lowest elevation: 162 m (531 ft)
- Population (2023): 187
  - Density: 43/km^{2} (110/sq mi)
- Time zone: UTC+01:00 (CET)
  - Summer (DST): UTC+02:00 (CEST)
- INSEE/Postal code: 60303 /60210
- ^{1} French Land Register data, which excludes lakes, ponds, glaciers > 1 km^{2} (0.386 sq mi or 247 acres) and river estuaries.

Hautbos (French pronunciation: [obo]) is a commune in the Oise department in northern France.

== See also ==
- Communes of the Oise department
