= Morvillers =

- Commune
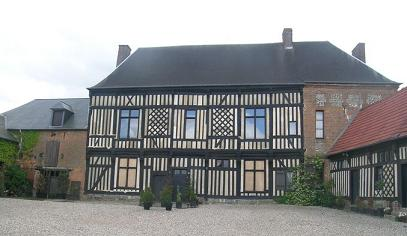
- The manor in Morvillers
- Location of Morvillers
- Location within France Location within Hauts-de-France
- Coordinates: 49°34′54″N 1°52′17″E
- Country: France
- Region: Hauts-de-France
- Department: Oise
- Arrondissement: Beauvais
- Canton: Grandvilliers
- Intercommunality: Picardie Verte

Government
  - Mayor (2020–2026): Gilles Notteboom
- Area^{1}: 10.80 km^{2} (4.17 sq mi)
- Elevation: 183 m (600 ft)
- Highest elevation: 193 m (633 ft)
- Lowest elevation: 123 m (404 ft)
- Population (2023): 506
  - Density: 46.9/km^{2} (121/sq mi)
- Time zone: UTC+01:00 (CET)
  - Summer (DST): UTC+02:00 (CEST)
- INSEE/Postal code: 60435 /60380
- ^{1} French Land Register data, which excludes lakes, ponds, glaciers > 1 km^{2} (0.386 sq mi or 247 acres) and river estuaries.

Morvillers is a commune in the Oise department in northern France.

== See also ==
- Communes of the Oise department
