= Gourchelles =

- Commune
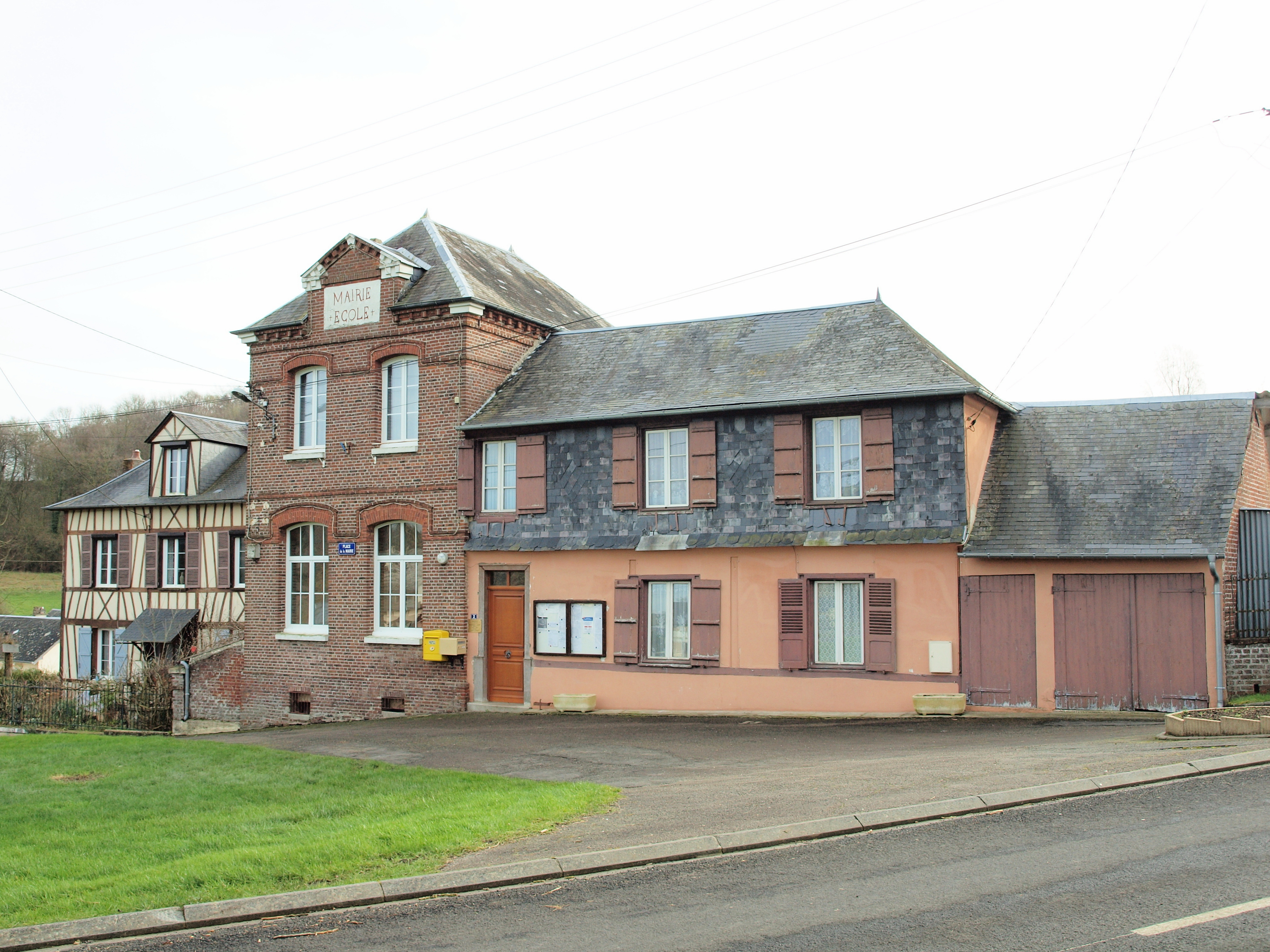
- The town hall in Gourchelles
- Location of Gourchelles
- Location within France Location within Hauts-de-France
- Coordinates: 49°43′48″N 1°46′51″E
- Country: France
- Region: Hauts-de-France
- Department: Oise
- Arrondissement: Beauvais
- Canton: Grandvilliers
- Intercommunality: Picardie Verte

Government
  - Mayor (2020–2026): Christophe Cocu
- Area^{1}: 2.23 km^{2} (0.86 sq mi)
- Elevation: 169 m (554 ft)
- Highest elevation: 215 m (705 ft)
- Lowest elevation: 158 m (518 ft)
- Population (2023): 102
  - Density: 45.7/km^{2} (118/sq mi)
- Time zone: UTC+01:00 (CET)
  - Summer (DST): UTC+02:00 (CEST)
- INSEE/Postal code: 60280 /60220
- ^{1} French Land Register data, which excludes lakes, ponds, glaciers > 1 km^{2} (0.386 sq mi or 247 acres) and river estuaries.

Gourchelles (French pronunciation: [ɡuʁʃɛl]) is a commune in the Oise department in northern France.

== See also ==
- Communes of the Oise department
