= Canton of Grandvilliers =

Canton of France

Coordinates: 49.67°N 1.94°E

- Canton
- Situation of the canton of Grandvilliers in the department of Oise
- Country: France
- Region: Hauts-de-France
- Department: Oise
- No. of communes: {{{nbcomm}}}
- Population (2023): 39,668
- INSEE code: 6011

The canton of Grandvilliers is an administrative division of the Oise department, northern France. Its borders were modified at the French canton reorganisation which came into effect in March 2015. Its seat is in Grandvilliers.

It consists of the following communes:

1. Abancourt
2. Achy
3. Bazancourt
4. Beaudéduit
5. Blacourt
6. Blargies
7. Blicourt
8. Bonnières
9. Bouvresse
10. Briot
11. Brombos
12. Broquiers
13. Buicourt
14. Campeaux
15. Canny-sur-Thérain
16. Cempuis
17. Le Coudray-Saint-Germer
18. Crillon
19. Cuigy-en-Bray
20. Daméraucourt
21. Dargies
22. Élencourt
23. Ernemont-Boutavent
24. Escames
25. Escles-Saint-Pierre
26. Espaubourg
27. Feuquières
28. Fontaine-Lavaganne
29. Fontenay-Torcy
30. Formerie
31. Fouilloy
32. Gaudechart
33. Gerberoy
34. Glatigny
35. Gourchelles
36. Grandvilliers
37. Grémévillers
38. Grez
39. Halloy
40. Le Hamel
41. Hannaches
42. Hanvoile
43. Haucourt
44. Hautbos
45. Haute-Épine
46. Hécourt
47. Héricourt-sur-Thérain
48. Hétomesnil
49. Hodenc-en-Bray
50. Lachapelle-sous-Gerberoy
51. Lannoy-Cuillère
52. Lavacquerie
53. Laverrière
54. Lhéraule
55. Lihus
56. Loueuse
57. Marseille-en-Beauvaisis
58. Martincourt
59. Le Mesnil-Conteville
60. Moliens
61. Monceaux-l'Abbaye
62. Morvillers
63. Mureaumont
64. La Neuville-sur-Oudeuil
65. La Neuville-Vault
66. Offoy
67. Omécourt
68. Oudeuil
69. Pisseleu
70. Prévillers
71. Puiseux-en-Bray
72. Quincampoix-Fleuzy
73. Romescamps
74. Rothois
75. Roy-Boissy
76. Saint-Arnoult
77. Saint-Deniscourt
78. Saint-Germer-de-Fly
79. Saint-Maur
80. Saint-Omer-en-Chaussée
81. Saint-Pierre-es-Champs
82. Saint-Quentin-des-Prés
83. Saint-Samson-la-Poterie
84. Saint-Thibault
85. Saint-Valery
86. Sarcus
87. Sarnois
88. Senantes
89. Sommereux
90. Songeons
91. Sully
92. Talmontiers
93. Thérines
94. Thieuloy-Saint-Antoine
95. Villembray
96. Villers-sur-Auchy
97. Villers-sur-Bonnières
98. Villers-Vermont
99. Vrocourt
100. Wambez
