= Cuigy-en-Bray =

- Commune
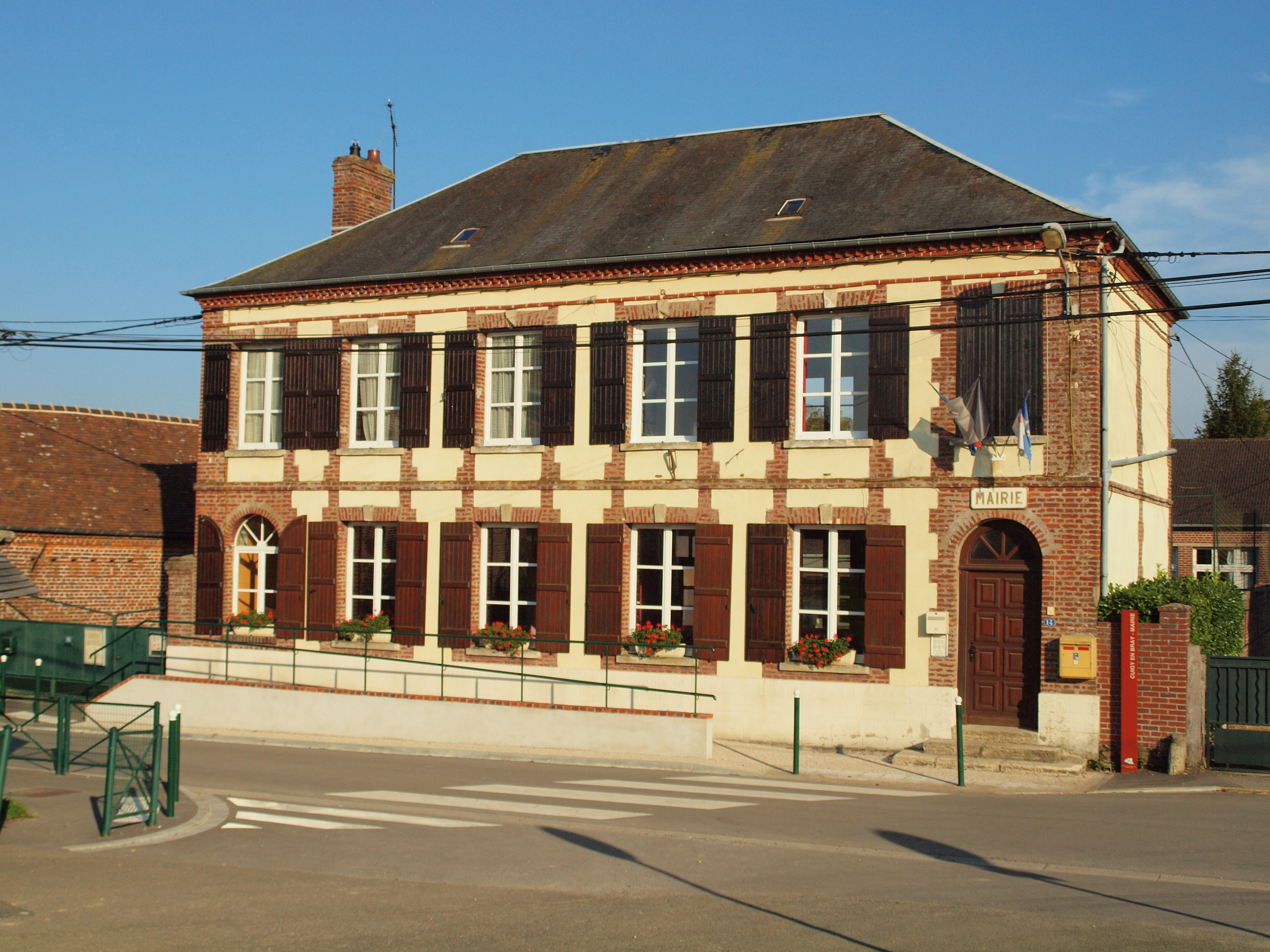
- The town hall in Cuigy-en-Bray
- Location of Cuigy-en-Bray
- Location within France Location within Hauts-de-France
- Coordinates: 49°25′37″N 1°49′38″E
- Country: France
- Region: Hauts-de-France
- Department: Oise
- Arrondissement: Beauvais
- Canton: Grandvilliers
- Intercommunality: Pays de Bray

Government
  - Mayor (2020–2026): Bernard Noyelle
- Area^{1}: 9.81 km^{2} (3.79 sq mi)
- Highest elevation: 226 m (741 ft)
- Lowest elevation: 96 m (315 ft)
- Population (2023): 987
  - Density: 101/km^{2} (261/sq mi)
- Time zone: UTC+01:00 (CET)
  - Summer (DST): UTC+02:00 (CEST)
- INSEE/Postal code: 60187 /60850
- ^{1} French Land Register data, which excludes lakes, ponds, glaciers > 1 km^{2} (0.386 sq mi or 247 acres) and river estuaries.

Cuigy-en-Bray (French pronunciation: [kɥiʒi ɑ̃ bʁɛ], literally Cuigy in Bray) is a commune in the Oise department in northern France.

== See also ==
- Communes of the Oise department
