= Ernemont-Boutavent =

- Commune
- Location of Ernemont-Boutavent
- Location within France Location within Hauts-de-France
- Coordinates: 49°35′24″N 1°48′32″E
- Country: France
- Region: Hauts-de-France
- Department: Oise
- Arrondissement: Beauvais
- Canton: Grandvilliers
- Intercommunality: Picardie Verte

Government
  - Mayor (2025–2026): Dimitri Clement
- Area^{1}: 8.95 km^{2} (3.46 sq mi)
- Elevation: 180 m (590 ft)
- Highest elevation: 206 m (676 ft)
- Lowest elevation: 147 m (482 ft)
- Population (2023): 172
  - Density: 19.2/km^{2} (49.8/sq mi)
- Time zone: UTC+01:00 (CET)
  - Summer (DST): UTC+02:00 (CEST)
- INSEE/Postal code: 60214 /60380
- ^{1} French Land Register data, which excludes lakes, ponds, glaciers > 1 km^{2} (0.386 sq mi or 247 acres) and river estuaries.

Ernemont-Boutavent (French pronunciation: [ɛʁnəmɔ̃ butavɑ̃]) is a commune in the Oise department in northern France.

== See also ==
- Communes of the Oise department
