= Vrocourt =

- Commune
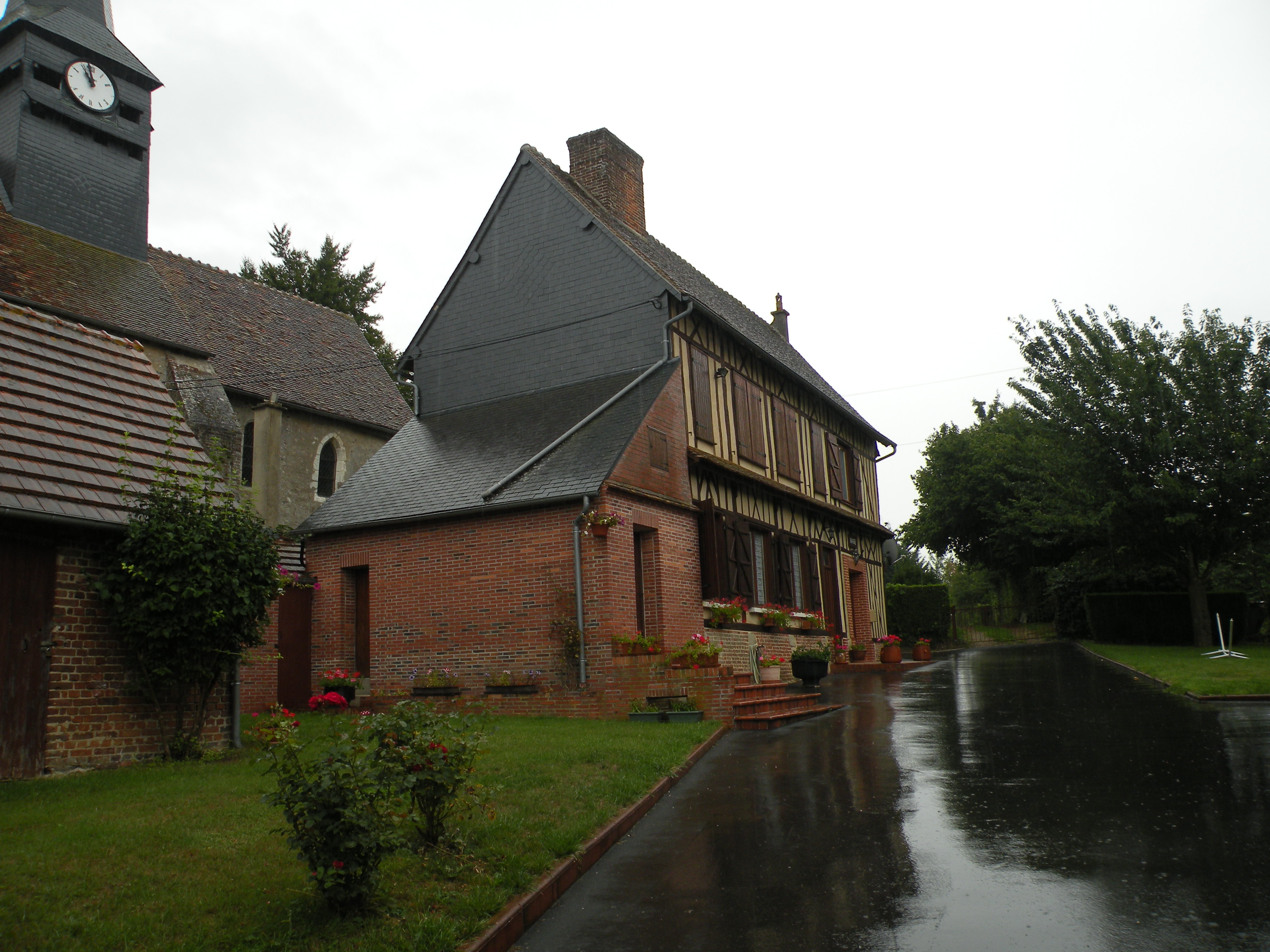
- The town hall in Vrocourt
- Location of Vrocourt
- Location within France Location within Hauts-de-France
- Coordinates: 49°31′47″N 1°53′14″E
- Country: France
- Region: Hauts-de-France
- Department: Oise
- Arrondissement: Beauvais
- Canton: Grandvilliers
- Intercommunality: Picardie Verte

Government
  - Mayor (2020–2026): Aurélie Leguay
- Area^{1}: 4.4 km^{2} (1.7 sq mi)
- Elevation: 104 m (341 ft)
- Highest elevation: 181 m (594 ft)
- Lowest elevation: 99 m (325 ft)
- Population (2023): 33
  - Density: 7.5/km^{2} (19/sq mi)
- Time zone: UTC+01:00 (CET)
  - Summer (DST): UTC+02:00 (CEST)
- INSEE/Postal code: 60697 /60112
- ^{1} French Land Register data, which excludes lakes, ponds, glaciers > 1 km^{2} (0.386 sq mi or 247 acres) and river estuaries.

Vrocourt (French pronunciation: [vʁɔkuʁ]) is a commune in the Oise department in northern France.

== Demography ==
Historical population
Year	Pop.	±% p.a.
1968	40	—
1975	31	−3.58%
1982	30	−0.47%
1990	33	+1.20%
1999	42	+2.72%
2007	41	−0.30%
2012	38	−1.51%
2017	33	−2.78%
2023	33	+0.00%
Source: INSEE

== See also ==
- Communes of the Oise department
