= Lhéraule =

- Commune
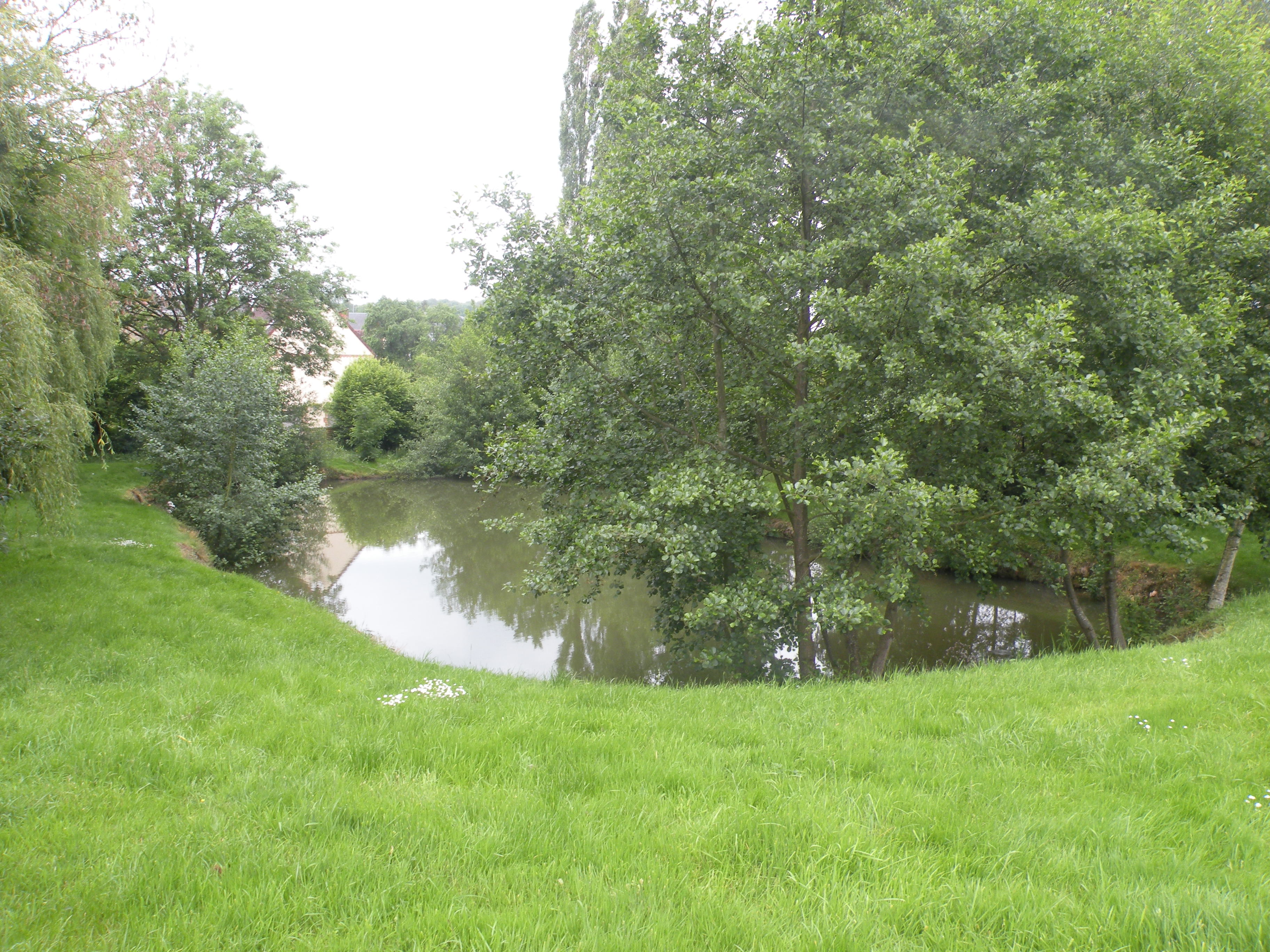
- The park lake in Lhéraule
- Location of Lhéraule
- Location within France Location within Hauts-de-France
- Coordinates: 49°29′17″N 1°55′55″E
- Country: France
- Region: Hauts-de-France
- Department: Oise
- Arrondissement: Beauvais
- Canton: Grandvilliers
- Intercommunality: Pays de Bray

Government
  - Mayor (2020–2026): Gérard Plée
- Area^{1}: 2.76 km^{2} (1.07 sq mi)
- Elevation: 180 m (590 ft)
- Highest elevation: 218 m (715 ft)
- Lowest elevation: 118 m (387 ft)
- Population (2023): 203
  - Density: 73.6/km^{2} (190/sq mi)
- Time zone: UTC+01:00 (CET)
  - Summer (DST): UTC+02:00 (CEST)
- INSEE/Postal code: 60359 /60650
- ^{1} French Land Register data, which excludes lakes, ponds, glaciers > 1 km^{2} (0.386 sq mi or 247 acres) and river estuaries.

Lhéraule (French pronunciation: [leʁol]) is a commune in the Oise department in northern France.

== See also ==
- Communes of the Oise department
