= Broquiers =

- Commune
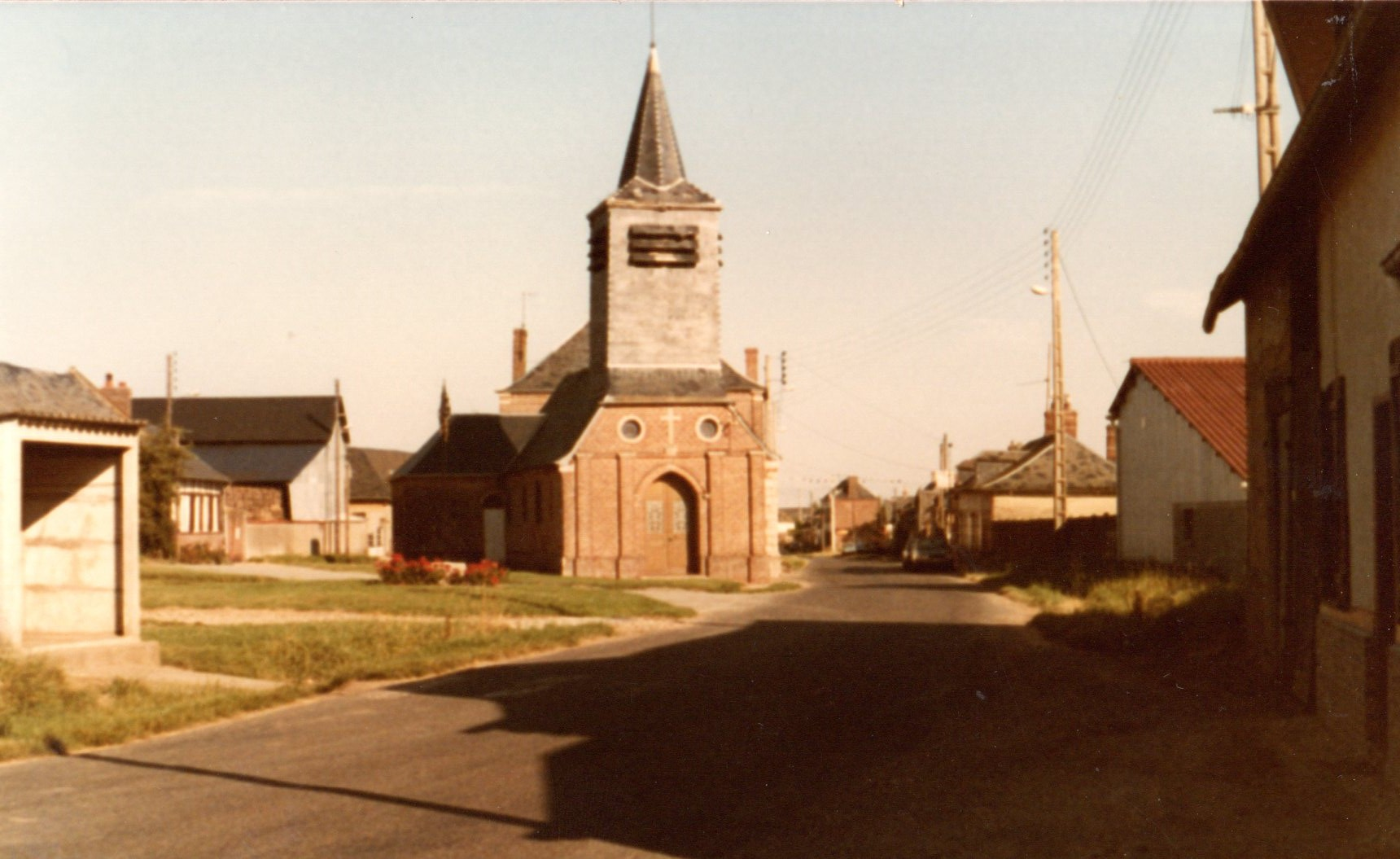
- The church in Broquiers
- Location of Broquiers
- Location within France Location within Hauts-de-France
- Coordinates: 49°39′38″N 1°49′50″E
- Country: France
- Region: Hauts-de-France
- Department: Oise
- Arrondissement: Beauvais
- Canton: Grandvilliers
- Intercommunality: Picardie Verte

Government
  - Mayor (2020–2026): Yolaine Delettre
- Area^{1}: 2.92 km^{2} (1.13 sq mi)
- Elevation: 204 m (669 ft)
- Highest elevation: 212 m (696 ft)
- Lowest elevation: 192 m (630 ft)
- Population (2023): 231
  - Density: 79.1/km^{2} (205/sq mi)
- Time zone: UTC+01:00 (CET)
  - Summer (DST): UTC+02:00 (CEST)
- INSEE/Postal code: 60110 /60220
- ^{1} French Land Register data, which excludes lakes, ponds, glaciers > 1 km^{2} (0.386 sq mi or 247 acres) and river estuaries.

Broquiers (French pronunciation: [bʁɔkje]) is a commune in the Oise department in northern France.

== Population ==
Historical population
Year	Pop.	±% p.a.
1968	185	—
1975	190	+0.38%
1982	186	−0.30%
1990	218	+2.00%
1999	225	+0.35%
2007	221	−0.22%
2012	236	+1.32%
2017	242	+0.50%
2023	231	−0.77%
Source: INSEE

== See also ==
- Communes of the Oise department
