= Sommereux =

- Commune
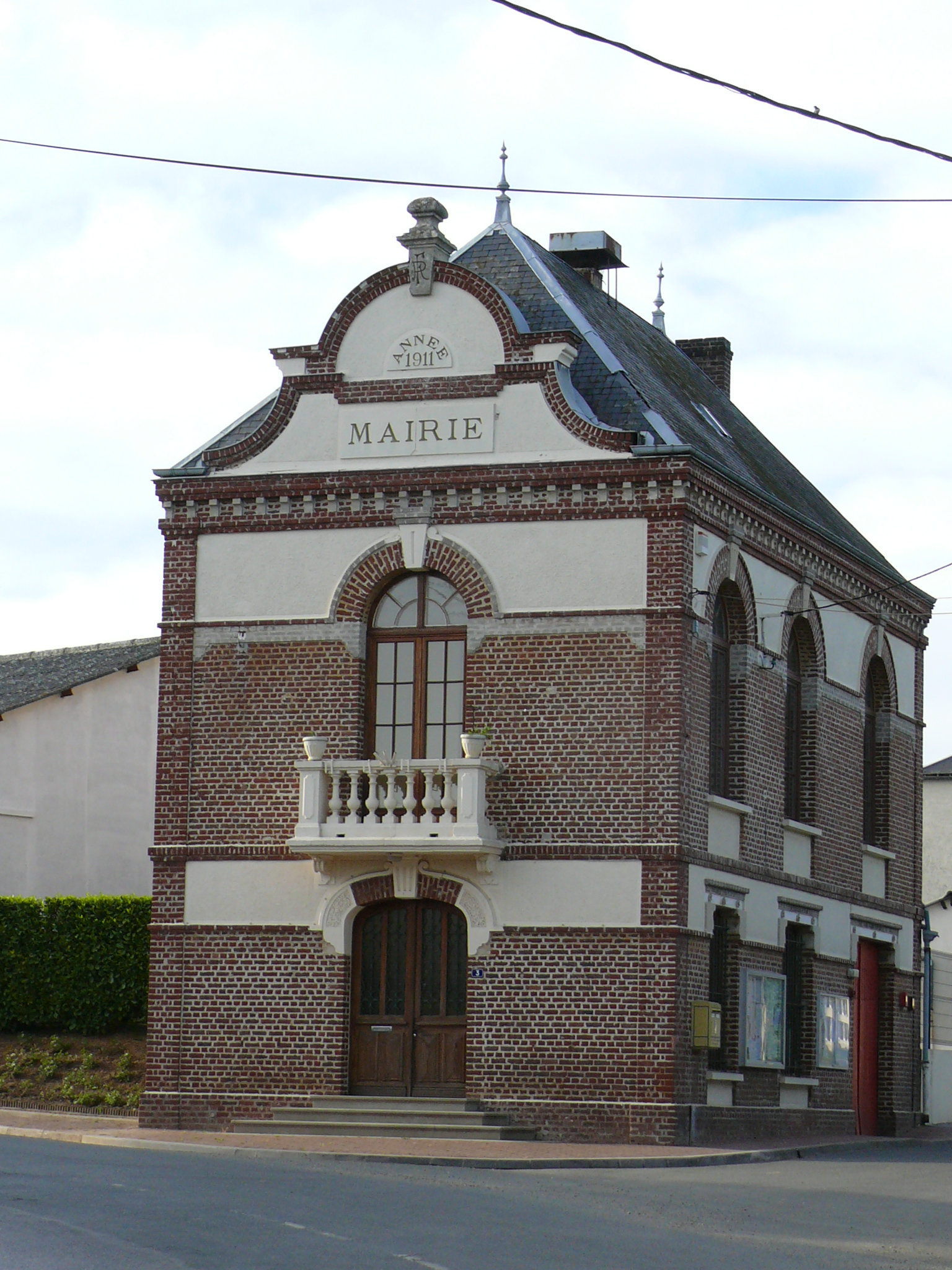
- The town hall in Sommereux
- Location of Sommereux
- Location within France Location within Hauts-de-France
- Coordinates: 49°40′46″N 1°59′35″E
- Country: France
- Region: Hauts-de-France
- Department: Oise
- Arrondissement: Beauvais
- Canton: Grandvilliers
- Intercommunality: Picardie Verte

Government
  - Mayor (2020–2026): Jean-Claude Mercier
- Area^{1}: 12.97 km^{2} (5.01 sq mi)
- Elevation: 186 m (610 ft)
- Highest elevation: 190 m (620 ft)
- Lowest elevation: 116 m (381 ft)
- Population (2023): 481
  - Density: 37.1/km^{2} (96.1/sq mi)
- Time zone: UTC+01:00 (CET)
  - Summer (DST): UTC+02:00 (CEST)
- INSEE/Postal code: 60622 /60210
- ^{1} French Land Register data, which excludes lakes, ponds, glaciers > 1 km^{2} (0.386 sq mi or 247 acres) and river estuaries.

Sommereux is a commune in the Oise department in northern France.

== See also ==
- Communes of the Oise department
