= Rothois =

- Commune
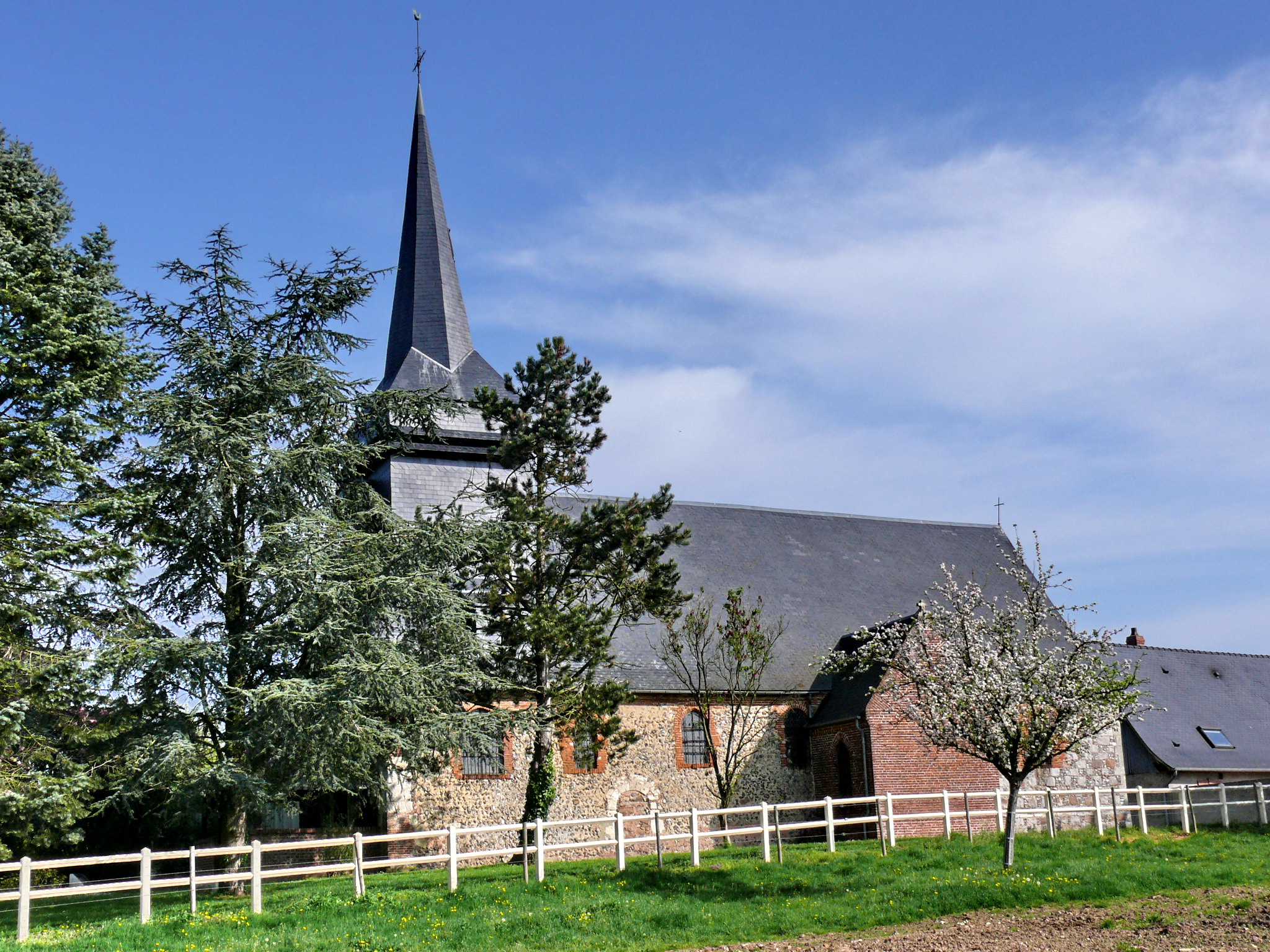
- The church in Rothois
- Location of Rothois
- Location within France Location within Hauts-de-France
- Coordinates: 49°35′57″N 1°59′44″E
- Country: France
- Region: Hauts-de-France
- Department: Oise
- Arrondissement: Beauvais
- Canton: Grandvilliers
- Intercommunality: Picardie Verte

Government
  - Mayor (2020–2026): André Gorenflos
- Area^{1}: 3.18 km^{2} (1.23 sq mi)
- Elevation: 173 m (568 ft)
- Highest elevation: 187 m (614 ft)
- Lowest elevation: 160 m (520 ft)
- Population (2023): 227
  - Density: 71.4/km^{2} (185/sq mi)
- Time zone: UTC+01:00 (CET)
  - Summer (DST): UTC+02:00 (CEST)
- INSEE/Postal code: 60550 /60690
- ^{1} French Land Register data, which excludes lakes, ponds, glaciers > 1 km^{2} (0.386 sq mi or 247 acres) and river estuaries.

Rothois (French pronunciation: [ʁɔtwa]) is a commune in the Oise department in northern France.

== See also ==
- Communes of the Oise department
