= Lachapelle-sous-Gerberoy =

- Commune
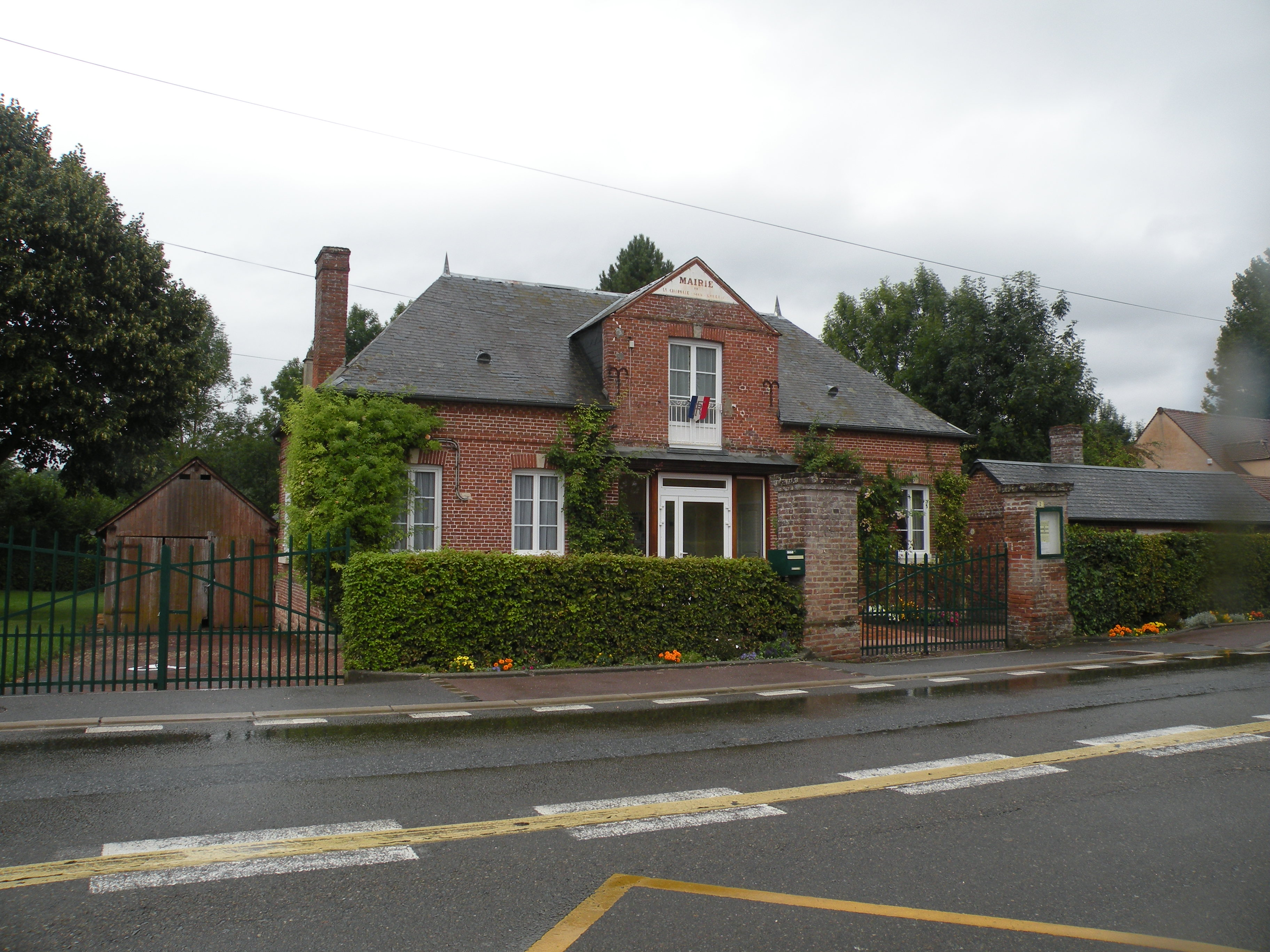
- The town hall in Lachapelle-sous-Gerberoy
- Location of Lachapelle-sous-Gerberoy
- Location within France Location within Hauts-de-France
- Coordinates: 49°32′09″N 1°52′10″E
- Country: France
- Region: Hauts-de-France
- Department: Oise
- Arrondissement: Beauvais
- Canton: Grandvilliers
- Intercommunality: Picardie Verte

Government
  - Mayor (2020–2026): Bruno Ronseaux
- Area^{1}: 4.93 km^{2} (1.90 sq mi)
- Elevation: 110 m (360 ft)
- Highest elevation: 182 m (597 ft)
- Lowest elevation: 103 m (338 ft)
- Population (2023): 165
  - Density: 33.5/km^{2} (86.7/sq mi)
- Time zone: UTC+01:00 (CET)
  - Summer (DST): UTC+02:00 (CEST)
- INSEE/Postal code: 60335 /60380
- ^{1} French Land Register data, which excludes lakes, ponds, glaciers > 1 km^{2} (0.386 sq mi or 247 acres) and river estuaries.

Lachapelle-sous-Gerberoy (French pronunciation: [laʃapɛl su ʒɛʁbəʁwa]) is a commune in the Oise department in northern France.

== See also ==
- Communes of the Oise department
