= Villers-Vermont =

- Commune
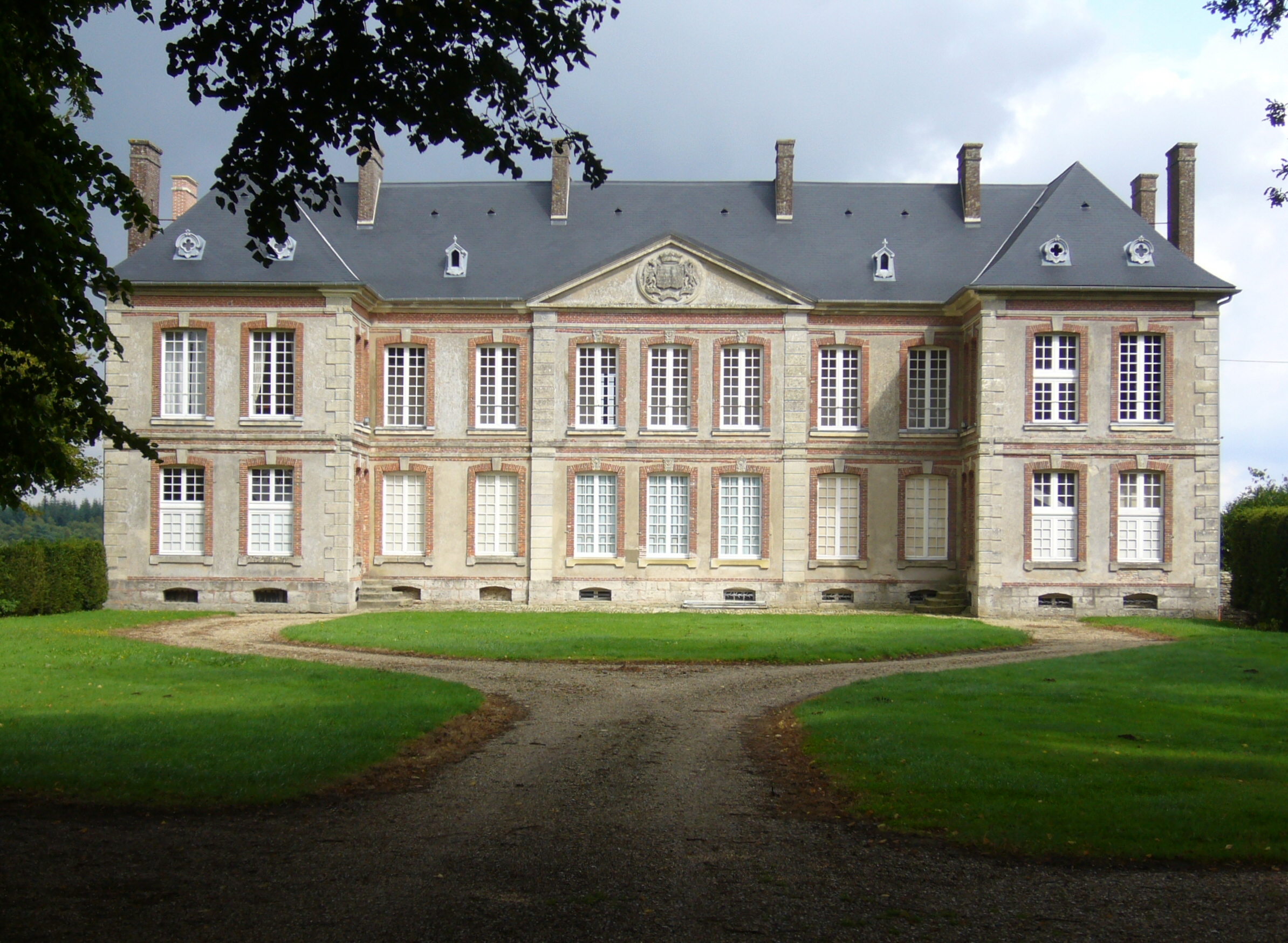
- The chateau of Mercastel, in Villers-Vermont
- Location of Villers-Vermont
- Location within France Location within Hauts-de-France
- Coordinates: 49°34′39″N 1°44′41″E
- Country: France
- Region: Hauts-de-France
- Department: Oise
- Arrondissement: Beauvais
- Canton: Grandvilliers
- Intercommunality: Picardie Verte

Government
  - Mayor (2020–2026): Marguerite Biron
- Area^{1}: 4.35 km^{2} (1.68 sq mi)
- Elevation: 215 m (705 ft)
- Highest elevation: 217 m (712 ft)
- Lowest elevation: 151 m (495 ft)
- Population (2023): 123
  - Density: 28.3/km^{2} (73.2/sq mi)
- Time zone: UTC+01:00 (CET)
  - Summer (DST): UTC+02:00 (CEST)
- INSEE/Postal code: 60691 /60380
- ^{1} French Land Register data, which excludes lakes, ponds, glaciers > 1 km^{2} (0.386 sq mi or 247 acres) and river estuaries.

Villers-Vermont (French pronunciation: [vilɛʁ vɛʁmɔ̃]) is a commune in the Oise department in northern France.

== See also ==
- Communes of the Oise department
