= Espaubourg =

- Commune
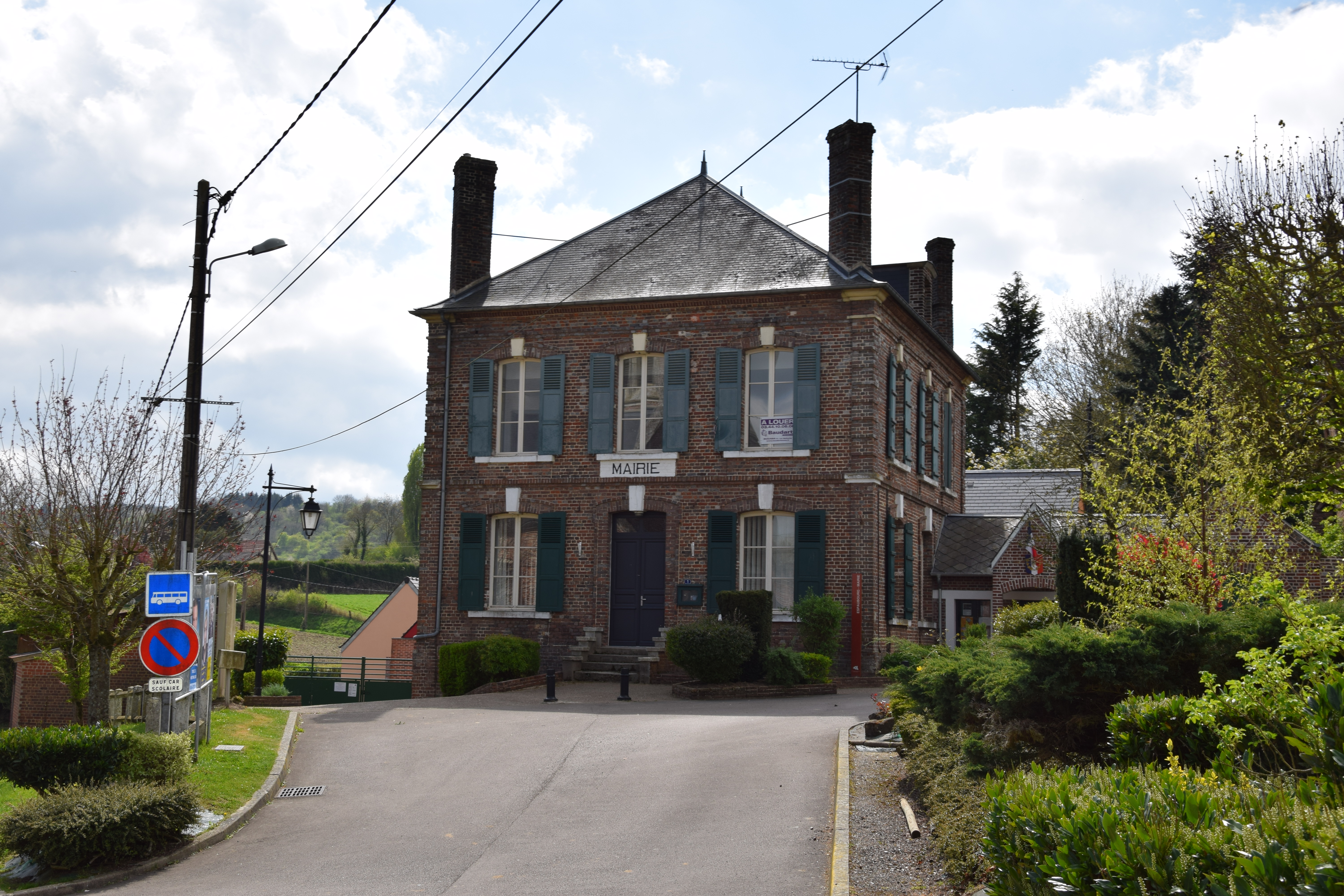
- The town hall in Espaubourg
- Location of Espaubourg
- Location within France Location within Hauts-de-France
- Coordinates: 49°25′22″N 1°52′02″E
- Country: France
- Region: Hauts-de-France
- Department: Oise
- Arrondissement: Beauvais
- Canton: Grandvilliers
- Intercommunality: Pays de Bray

Government
  - Mayor (2020–2026): Patrick Batot
- Area^{1}: 5.99 km^{2} (2.31 sq mi)
- Elevation: 100 m (330 ft)
- Highest elevation: 230 m (750 ft)
- Lowest elevation: 91 m (299 ft)
- Population (2023): 507
  - Density: 84.6/km^{2} (219/sq mi)
- Time zone: UTC+01:00 (CET)
  - Summer (DST): UTC+02:00 (CEST)
- INSEE/Postal code: 60220 /60650
- ^{1} French Land Register data, which excludes lakes, ponds, glaciers > 1 km^{2} (0.386 sq mi or 247 acres) and river estuaries.

Espaubourg (French pronunciation: [ɛspobuʁ]) is a commune in the Oise department in northern France.

== See also ==
- Communes of the Oise department
