= Daméraucourt =

- Commune
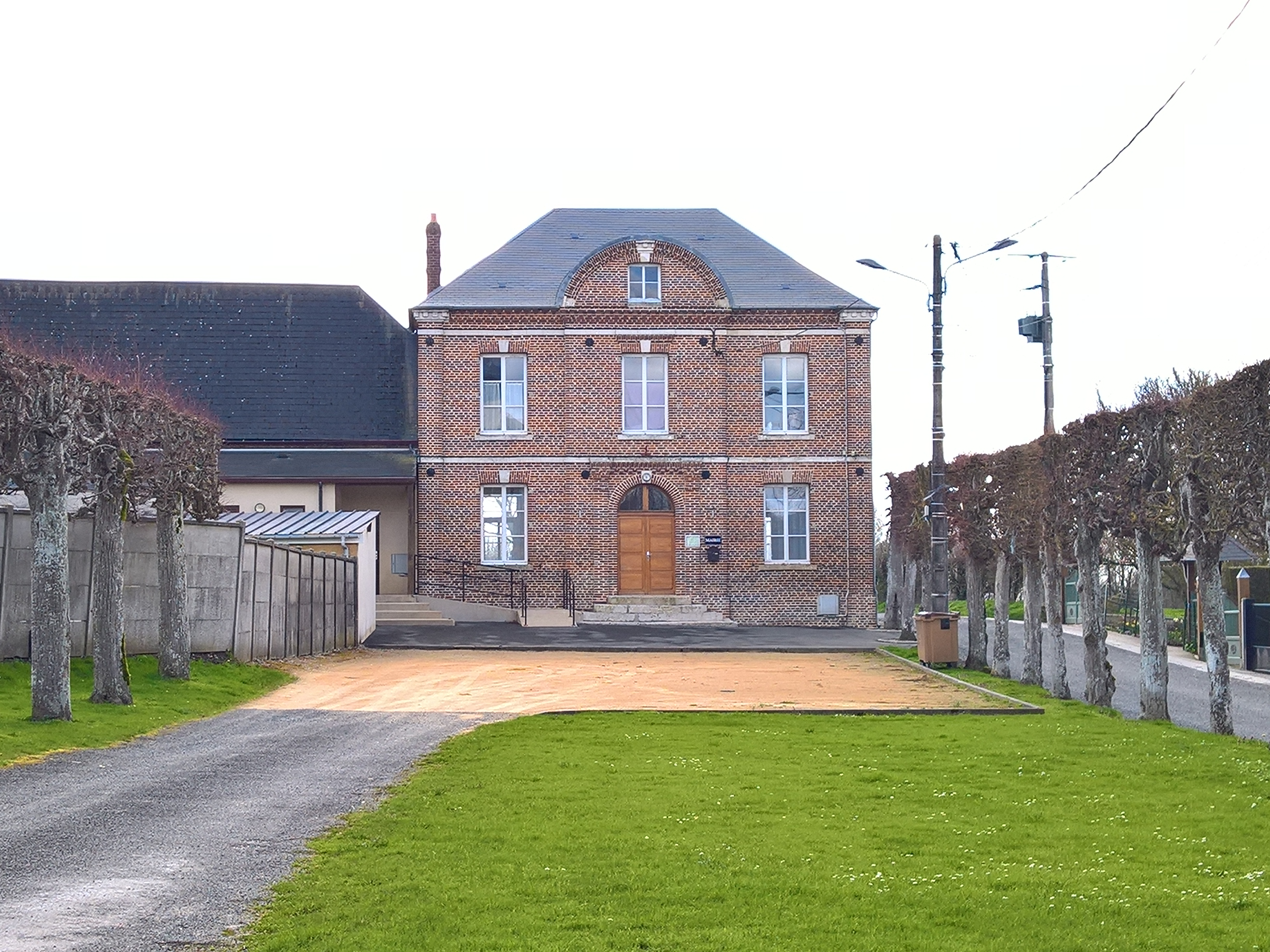
- The Town hall of Daméraucourt
- Location of Daméraucourt
- Location within France Location within Hauts-de-France
- Coordinates: 49°42′32″N 1°55′42″E
- Country: France
- Region: Hauts-de-France
- Department: Oise
- Arrondissement: Beauvais
- Canton: Grandvilliers
- Intercommunality: Picardie Verte

Government
  - Mayor (2020–2026): Hugues Crignon
- Area^{1}: 8.57 km^{2} (3.31 sq mi)
- Elevation: 182 m (597 ft)
- Highest elevation: 197 m (646 ft)
- Lowest elevation: 128 m (420 ft)
- Population (2023): 198
  - Density: 23.1/km^{2} (59.8/sq mi)
- Time zone: UTC+01:00 (CET)
  - Summer (DST): UTC+02:00 (CEST)
- INSEE/Postal code: 60193 /60210
- ^{1} French Land Register data, which excludes lakes, ponds, glaciers > 1 km^{2} (0.386 sq mi or 247 acres) and river estuaries.

Daméraucourt (French pronunciation: [dameʁokuʁ]) is a commune in the Oise department in northern France.

== See also ==
- Communes of the Oise department
