= Haute-Épine =

- Commune
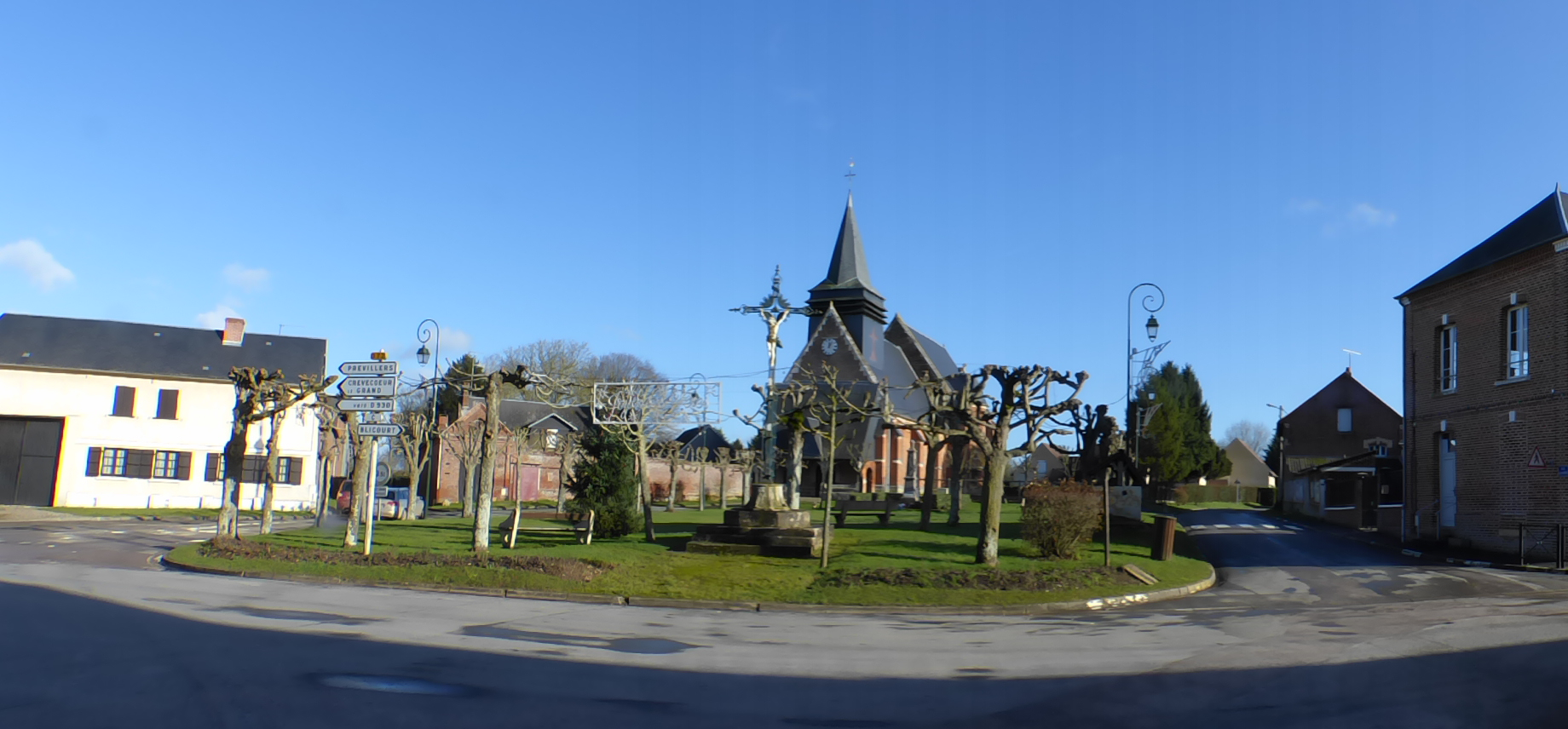
- The church square in Haute-Épine
- Location of Haute-Épine
- Location within France Location within Hauts-de-France
- Coordinates: 49°35′04″N 2°00′41″E
- Country: France
- Region: Hauts-de-France
- Department: Oise
- Arrondissement: Beauvais
- Canton: Grandvilliers
- Intercommunality: Picardie Verte

Government
  - Mayor (2020–2026): Aleth Béliard
- Area^{1}: 6.73 km^{2} (2.60 sq mi)
- Elevation: 188 m (617 ft)
- Highest elevation: 189 m (620 ft)
- Lowest elevation: 137 m (449 ft)
- Population (2023): 253
  - Density: 37.6/km^{2} (97.4/sq mi)
- Time zone: UTC+01:00 (CET)
  - Summer (DST): UTC+02:00 (CEST)
- INSEE/Postal code: 60304 /60690
- ^{1} French Land Register data, which excludes lakes, ponds, glaciers > 1 km^{2} (0.386 sq mi or 247 acres) and river estuaries.

Haute-Épine (French pronunciation: [ot epin]) is a commune in the Oise department in northern France.

== See also ==
- Communes of the Oise department
