= Hanvoile =

- Commune
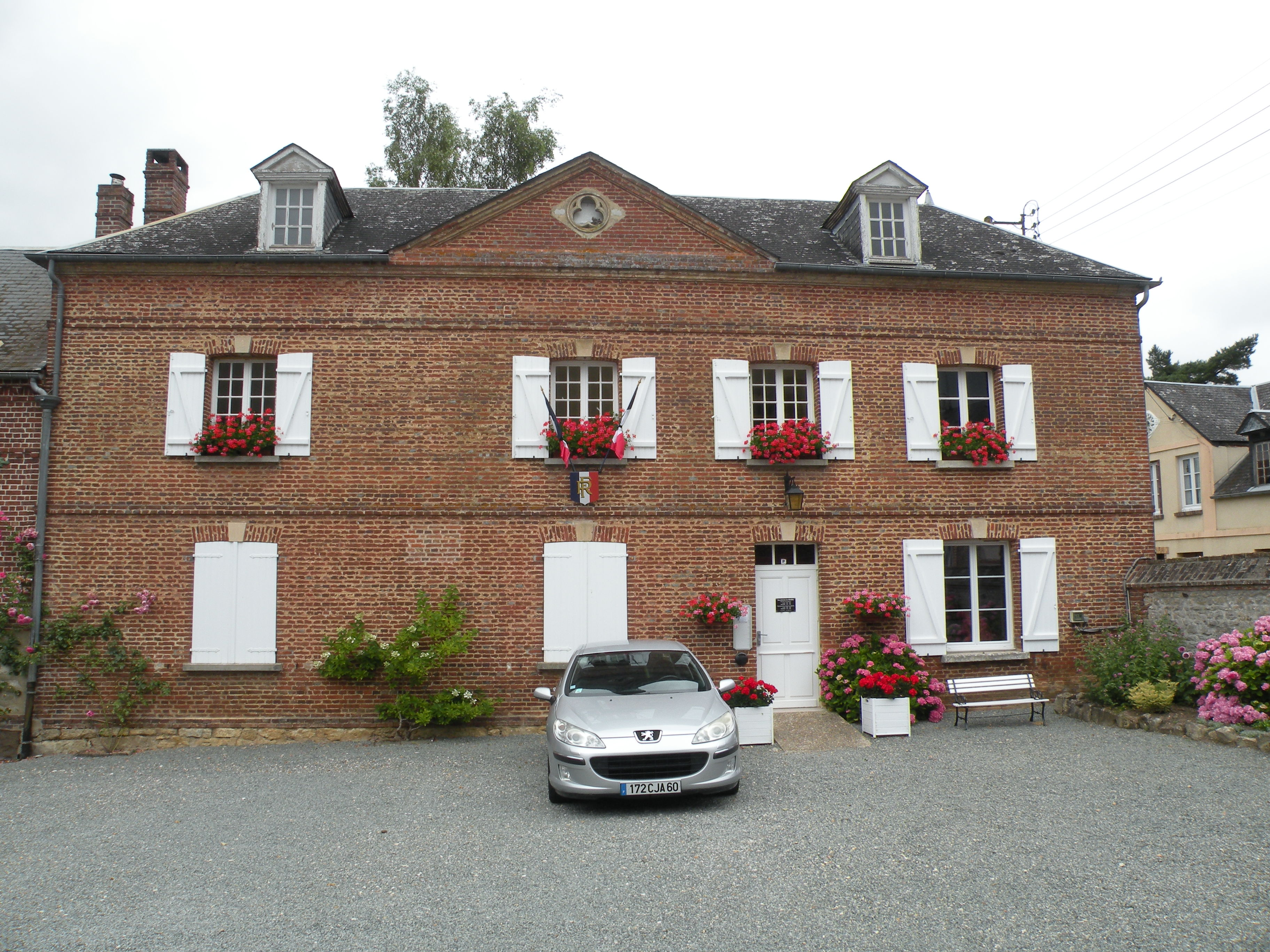
- The town hall in Hanvoile
- Location of Hanvoile
- Location within France Location within Hauts-de-France
- Coordinates: 49°30′45″N 1°52′50″E
- Country: France
- Region: Hauts-de-France
- Department: Oise
- Arrondissement: Beauvais
- Canton: Grandvilliers
- Intercommunality: Picardie Verte

Government
  - Mayor (2020–2026): Laurent Daniel
- Area^{1}: 5.88 km^{2} (2.27 sq mi)
- Elevation: 150 m (490 ft)
- Highest elevation: 208 m (682 ft)
- Lowest elevation: 115 m (377 ft)
- Population (2023): 654
  - Density: 111/km^{2} (288/sq mi)
- Time zone: UTC+01:00 (CET)
  - Summer (DST): UTC+02:00 (CEST)
- INSEE/Postal code: 60298 /60650
- ^{1} French Land Register data, which excludes lakes, ponds, glaciers > 1 km^{2} (0.386 sq mi or 247 acres) and river estuaries.

Hanvoile (French pronunciation: [ɑ̃vwal]) is a commune in the Oise department in northern France.

== See also ==
- Communes of the Oise department
