= Hétomesnil =

- Commune
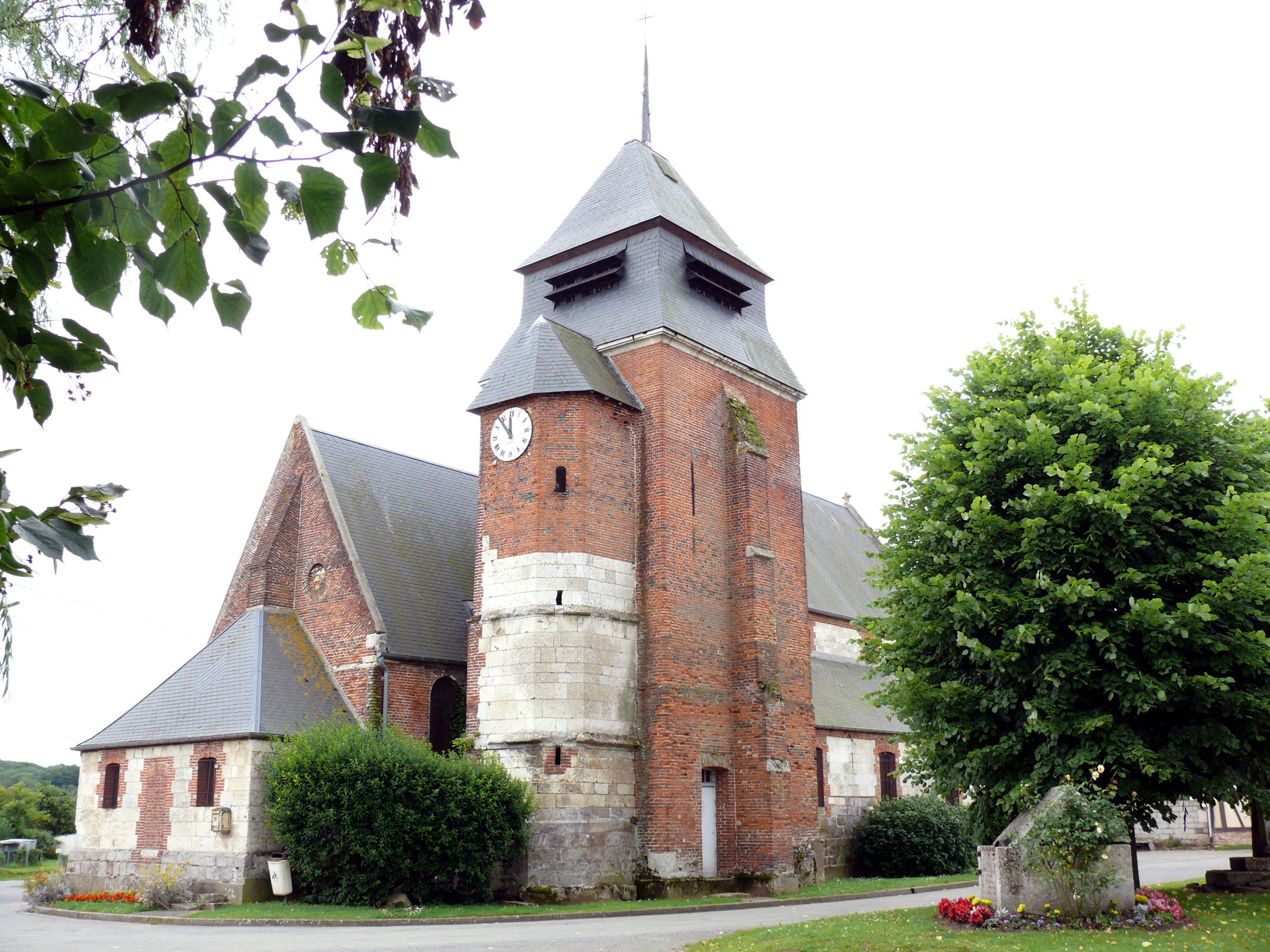
- The church in Hétomesnil
- Location of Hétomesnil
- Location within France Location within Hauts-de-France
- Coordinates: 49°37′38″N 2°02′00″E
- Country: France
- Region: Hauts-de-France
- Department: Oise
- Arrondissement: Beauvais
- Canton: Grandvilliers
- Intercommunality: Picardie Verte

Government
  - Mayor (2020–2026): Pascal Verbeke
- Area^{1}: 7.84 km^{2} (3.03 sq mi)
- Elevation: 179 m (587 ft)
- Highest elevation: 192 m (630 ft)
- Lowest elevation: 137 m (449 ft)
- Population (2023): 309
  - Density: 39.4/km^{2} (102/sq mi)
- Time zone: UTC+01:00 (CET)
  - Summer (DST): UTC+02:00 (CEST)
- INSEE/Postal code: 60314 /60360
- ^{1} French Land Register data, which excludes lakes, ponds, glaciers > 1 km^{2} (0.386 sq mi or 247 acres) and river estuaries.

Hétomesnil (French pronunciation: [etɔmenil]) is a commune in the Oise department in northern France.

== See also ==
- Communes of the Oise department
