= Saint-Deniscourt =

- Commune
- Location of Saint-Deniscourt
- Location within France Location within Hauts-de-France
- Coordinates: 49°36′23″N 1°52′16″E
- Country: France
- Region: Hauts-de-France
- Department: Oise
- Arrondissement: Beauvais
- Canton: Grandvilliers
- Intercommunality: Picardie Verte

Government
  - Mayor (2020–2026): Denis Bailly
- Area^{1}: 4.68 km^{2} (1.81 sq mi)
- Elevation: 180 m (590 ft)
- Highest elevation: 191 m (627 ft)
- Lowest elevation: 137 m (449 ft)
- Population (2023): 80
  - Density: 17/km^{2} (44/sq mi)
- Time zone: UTC+01:00 (CET)
  - Summer (DST): UTC+02:00 (CEST)
- INSEE/Postal code: 60571 /60380
- ^{1} French Land Register data, which excludes lakes, ponds, glaciers > 1 km^{2} (0.386 sq mi or 247 acres) and river estuaries.

Saint-Deniscourt (French pronunciation: [sɛ̃ dənikuʁ]) is a commune in the Oise department in northern France. According to the census in 2021, the population is about 81 with an area of 4.680 km^{2}.

== See also ==
- Communes of the Oise department
