= Grémévillers =

- Commune
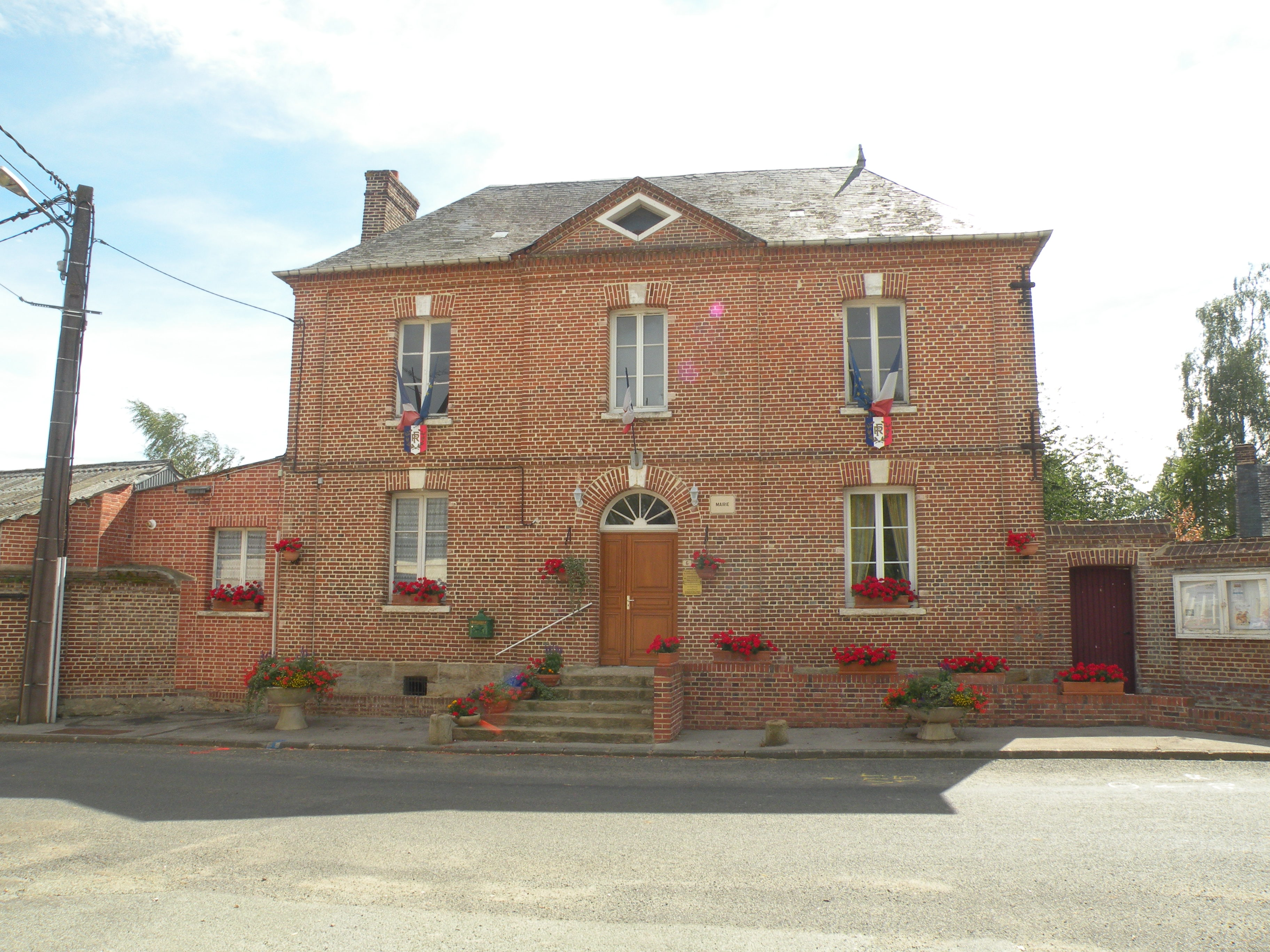
- The town hall in Grémévillers
- Location of Grémévillers
- Location within France Location within Hauts-de-France
- Coordinates: 49°33′52″N 1°53′49″E
- Country: France
- Region: Hauts-de-France
- Department: Oise
- Arrondissement: Beauvais
- Canton: Grandvilliers
- Intercommunality: Picardie Verte

Government
  - Mayor (2020–2026): Olivier Ancelin
- Area^{1}: 6.85 km^{2} (2.64 sq mi)
- Elevation: 170 m (560 ft)
- Highest elevation: 287 m (942 ft)
- Lowest elevation: 140 m (460 ft)
- Population (2023): 478
  - Density: 69.8/km^{2} (181/sq mi)
- Time zone: UTC+01:00 (CET)
  - Summer (DST): UTC+02:00 (CEST)
- INSEE/Postal code: 60288 /60380
- ^{1} French Land Register data, which excludes lakes, ponds, glaciers > 1 km^{2} (0.386 sq mi or 247 acres) and river estuaries.

Grémévillers is a commune in the Oise department in northern France.

== See also ==
- Communes of the Oise department
