= Le Hamel, Oise =

Le Hamel
- Commune
- Location of Le Hamel
- Location within France Location within Hauts-de-France
- Coordinates: 49°38′53″N 1°59′34″E
- Country: France
- Region: Hauts-de-France
- Department: Oise
- Arrondissement: Beauvais
- Canton: Grandvilliers
- Intercommunality: Picardie Verte

Government
  - Mayor (2020–2026): Jean-Jacques Adoux
- Area^{1}: 7.86 km^{2} (3.03 sq mi)
- Elevation: 182 m (597 ft)
- Highest elevation: 189 m (620 ft)
- Lowest elevation: 129 m (423 ft)
- Population (2023): 180
  - Density: 23/km^{2} (59/sq mi)
- Time zone: UTC+01:00 (CET)
  - Summer (DST): UTC+02:00 (CEST)
- INSEE/Postal code: 60297 /60210
- ^{1} French Land Register data, which excludes lakes, ponds, glaciers > 1 km^{2} (0.386 sq mi or 247 acres) and river estuaries.

Le Hamel (French pronunciation: [lə amɛl]) is a commune in the Oise department in northern France.

== See also ==
- Communes of the Oise department
