= Villembray =

- Commune
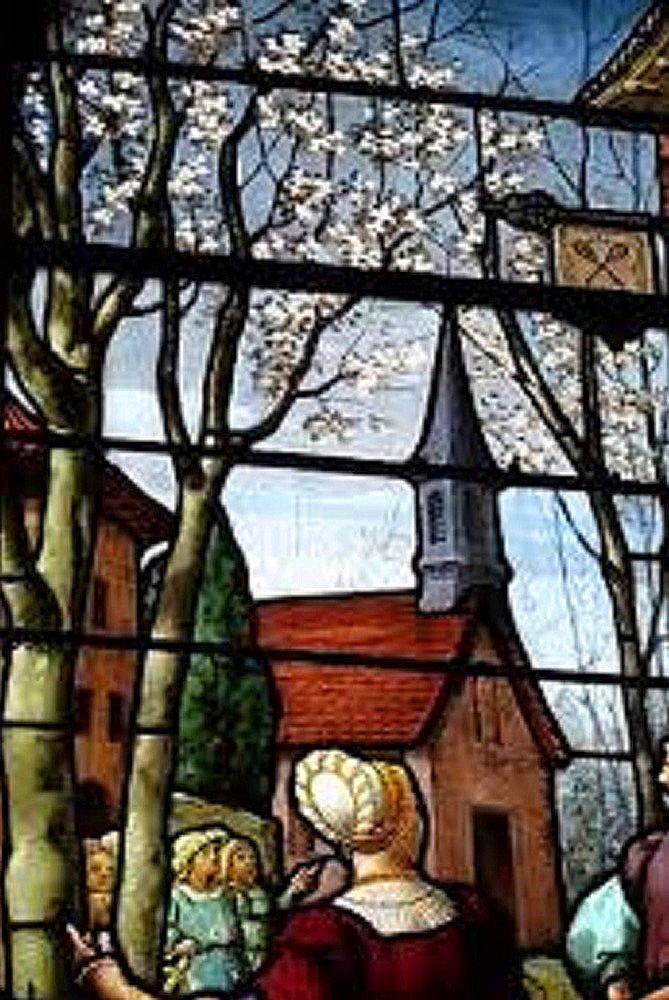
- The church in Villembray
- Location of Villembray
- Location within France Location within Hauts-de-France
- Coordinates: 49°28′37″N 1°52′10″E
- Country: France
- Region: Hauts-de-France
- Department: Oise
- Arrondissement: Beauvais
- Canton: Grandvilliers
- Intercommunality: Pays de Bray

Government
  - Mayor (2020–2026): Christelle Rousseau
- Area^{1}: 6.53 km^{2} (2.52 sq mi)
- Elevation: 182 m (597 ft)
- Highest elevation: 208 m (682 ft)
- Lowest elevation: 112 m (367 ft)
- Population (2023): 247
  - Density: 37.8/km^{2} (98.0/sq mi)
- Time zone: UTC+01:00 (CET)
  - Summer (DST): UTC+02:00 (CEST)
- INSEE/Postal code: 60677 /60650
- ^{1} French Land Register data, which excludes lakes, ponds, glaciers > 1 km^{2} (0.386 sq mi or 247 acres) and river estuaries.

Villembray (French pronunciation: [vilɑ̃bʁɛ]) is a commune in the Oise department and in the Hauts-de-France region in northern France.

== See also ==
- Communes of the Oise department
