= Wambez =

- Commune
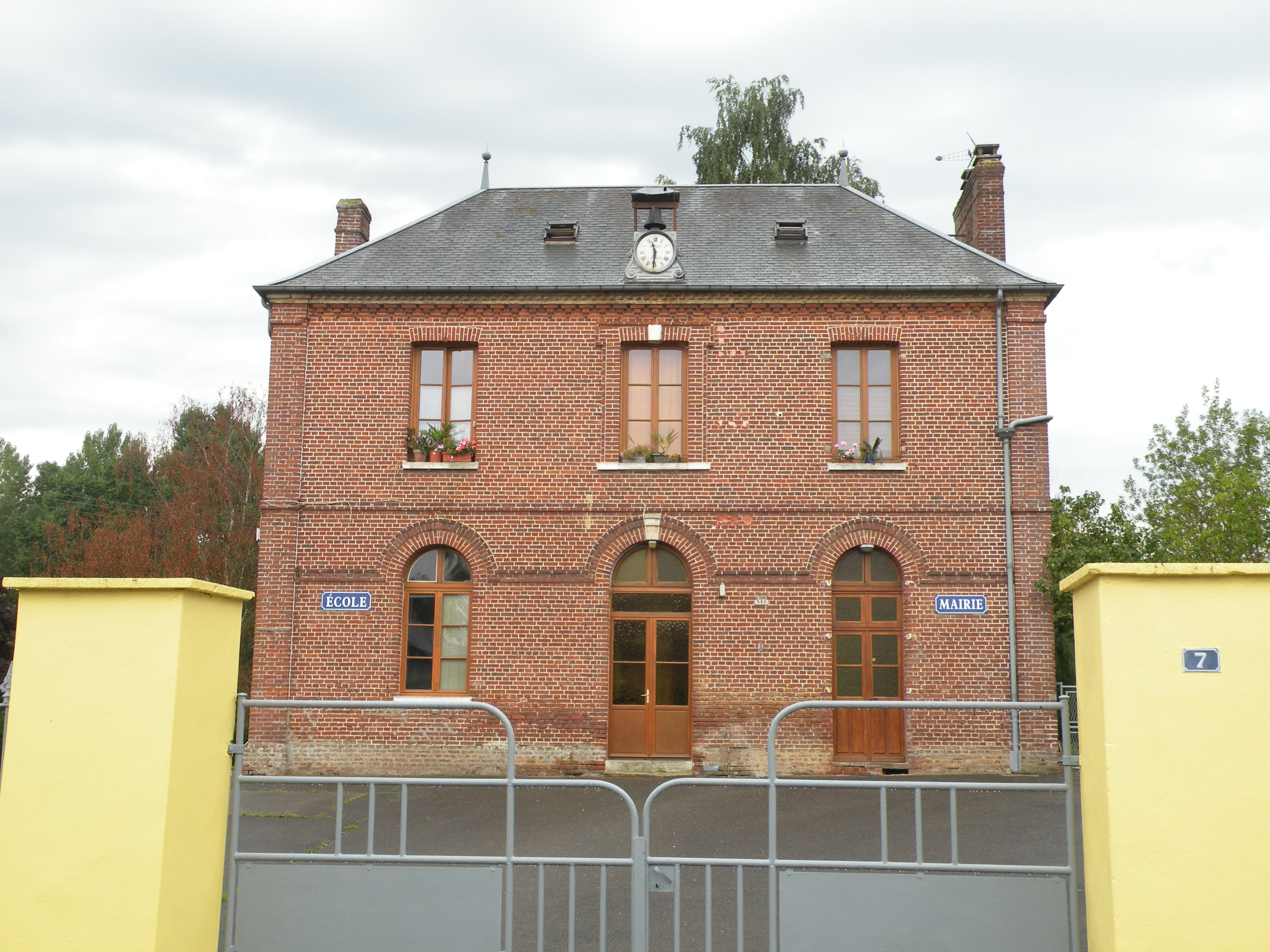
- The town hall in Wambez
- Location of Wambez
- Location within France Location within Hauts-de-France
- Coordinates: 49°31′38″N 1°51′07″E
- Country: France
- Region: Hauts-de-France
- Department: Oise
- Arrondissement: Beauvais
- Canton: Grandvilliers
- Intercommunality: Picardie Verte

Government
  - Mayor (2020–2026): Jacky Durand
- Area^{1}: 4.54 km^{2} (1.75 sq mi)
- Elevation: 153 m (502 ft)
- Highest elevation: 208 m (682 ft)
- Lowest elevation: 119 m (390 ft)
- Population (2023): 158
  - Density: 34.8/km^{2} (90.1/sq mi)
- Time zone: UTC+01:00 (CET)
  - Summer (DST): UTC+02:00 (CEST)
- INSEE/Postal code: 60699 /60380
- ^{1} French Land Register data, which excludes lakes, ponds, glaciers > 1 km^{2} (0.386 sq mi or 247 acres) and river estuaries.

Wambez is a commune in the Oise department in northern France.

== Population ==
Historical population
Year	Pop.	±% p.a.
1968	80	—
1975	115	+5.32%
1982	148	+3.67%
1990	118	−2.79%
1999	123	+0.46%
2007	154	+2.85%
2012	153	−0.13%
2017	164	+1.40%
2023	158	−0.62%
Source: INSEE

== See also ==
- Communes of the Oise department
