= Canny-sur-Thérain =

- Commune
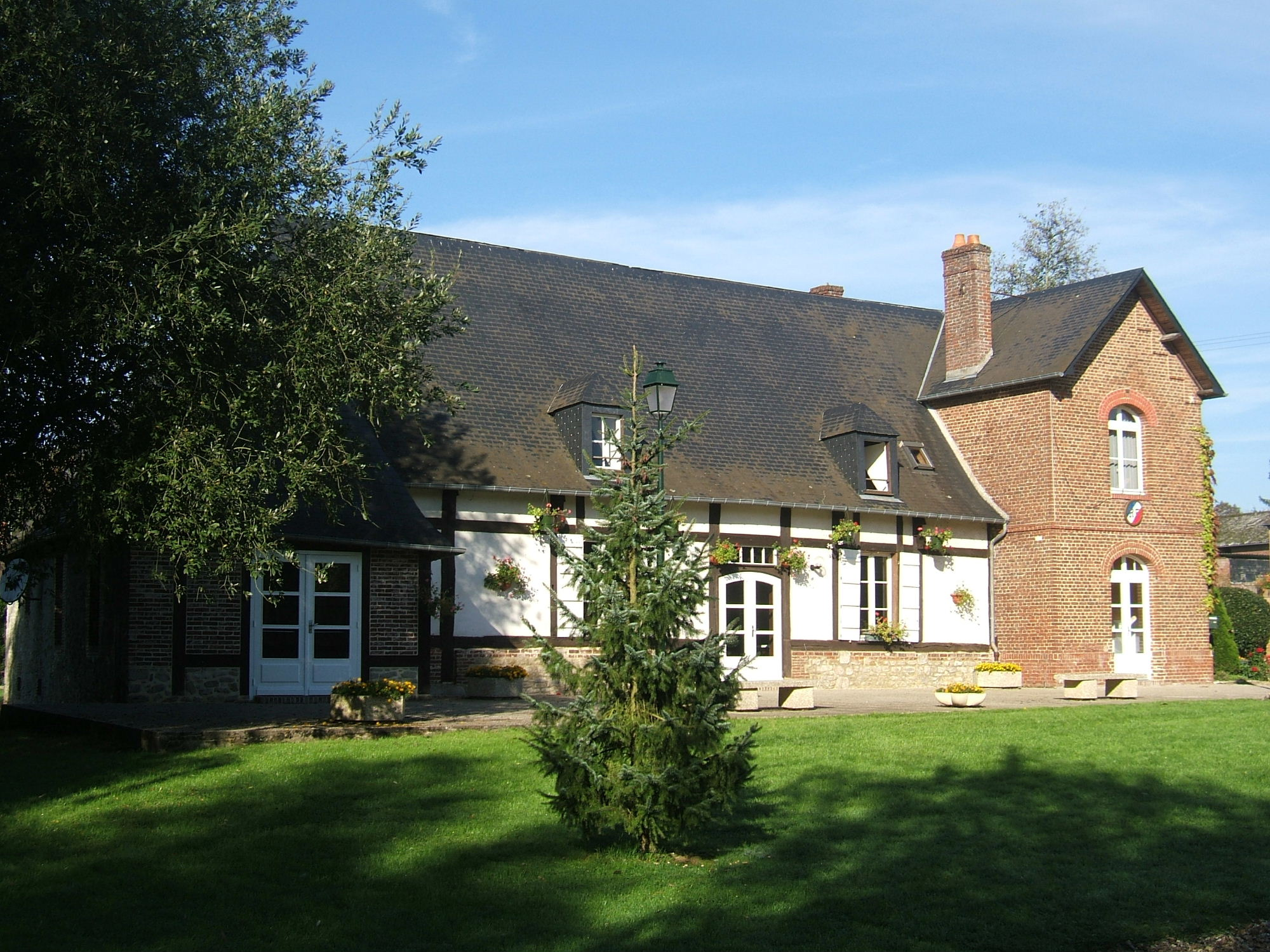
- The town hall in Canny-sur-Thérain
- Location of Canny-sur-Thérain
- Location within France Location within Hauts-de-France
- Coordinates: 49°36′08″N 1°43′00″E
- Country: France
- Region: Hauts-de-France
- Department: Oise
- Arrondissement: Beauvais
- Canton: Grandvilliers
- Intercommunality: Picardie Verte

Government
  - Mayor (2020–2026): Philippe Lavernhe
- Area^{1}: 5.92 km^{2} (2.29 sq mi)
- Elevation: 164 m (538 ft)
- Highest elevation: 224 m (735 ft)
- Lowest elevation: 155 m (509 ft)
- Population (2023): 222
  - Density: 37.5/km^{2} (97.1/sq mi)
- Time zone: UTC+01:00 (CET)
  - Summer (DST): UTC+02:00 (CEST)
- INSEE/Postal code: 60128 /60220
- ^{1} French Land Register data, which excludes lakes, ponds, glaciers > 1 km^{2} (0.386 sq mi or 247 acres) and river estuaries.

Canny-sur-Thérain (French pronunciation: [kani syʁ teʁɛ̃], literally Canny on Thérain) is a commune in the Oise department in northern France.

== See also ==
- Communes of the Oise department
