= Prévillers =

- Commune
- Location of Prévillers
- Location within France Location within Hauts-de-France
- Coordinates: 49°36′40″N 1°59′50″E
- Country: France
- Region: Hauts-de-France
- Department: Oise
- Arrondissement: Beauvais
- Canton: Grandvilliers
- Intercommunality: Picardie Verte

Government
  - Mayor (2020–2026): Frédéric Van de Caveye
- Area^{1}: 5.18 km^{2} (2.00 sq mi)
- Elevation: 185 m (607 ft)
- Highest elevation: 198 m (650 ft)
- Lowest elevation: 151 m (495 ft)
- Population (2023): 251
  - Density: 48.5/km^{2} (125/sq mi)
- Time zone: UTC+01:00 (CET)
  - Summer (DST): UTC+02:00 (CEST)
- INSEE/Postal code: 60514 /60360
- ^{1} French Land Register data, which excludes lakes, ponds, glaciers > 1 km^{2} (0.386 sq mi or 247 acres) and river estuaries.

Prévillers is a commune in the Oise department in northern France.

== See also ==
- Communes of the Oise department
