= Sully, Oise =

Sully
- Commune
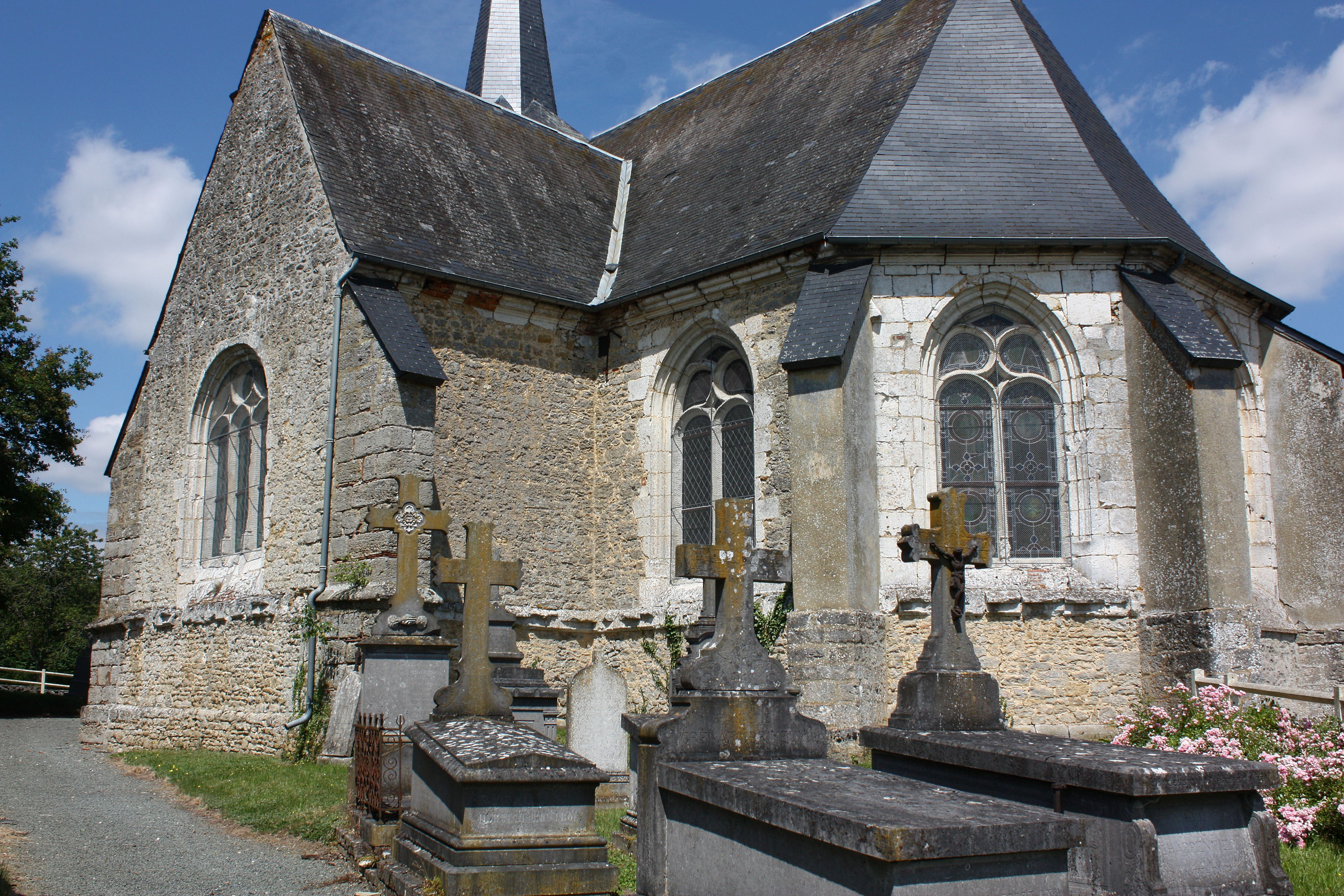
- The church in Sully
- Location of Sully
- Location within France Location within Hauts-de-France
- Coordinates: 49°33′35″N 1°46′55″E
- Country: France
- Region: Hauts-de-France
- Department: Oise
- Arrondissement: Beauvais
- Canton: Grandvilliers
- Intercommunality: Picardie Verte

Government
  - Mayor (2020–2026): Josiane Houepe
- Area^{1}: 4.83 km^{2} (1.86 sq mi)
- Elevation: 105 m (344 ft)
- Highest elevation: 212 m (696 ft)
- Lowest elevation: 128 m (420 ft)
- Population (2023): 165
  - Density: 34.2/km^{2} (88.5/sq mi)
- Time zone: UTC+01:00 (CET)
  - Summer (DST): UTC+02:00 (CEST)
- INSEE/Postal code: 60624 /60380
- ^{1} French Land Register data, which excludes lakes, ponds, glaciers > 1 km^{2} (0.386 sq mi or 247 acres) and river estuaries.

Sully (French pronunciation: [syli]) is a commune in the Oise department in northern France.

== See also ==
- Communes of the Oise department
