= Monceaux-l'Abbaye =

- Commune
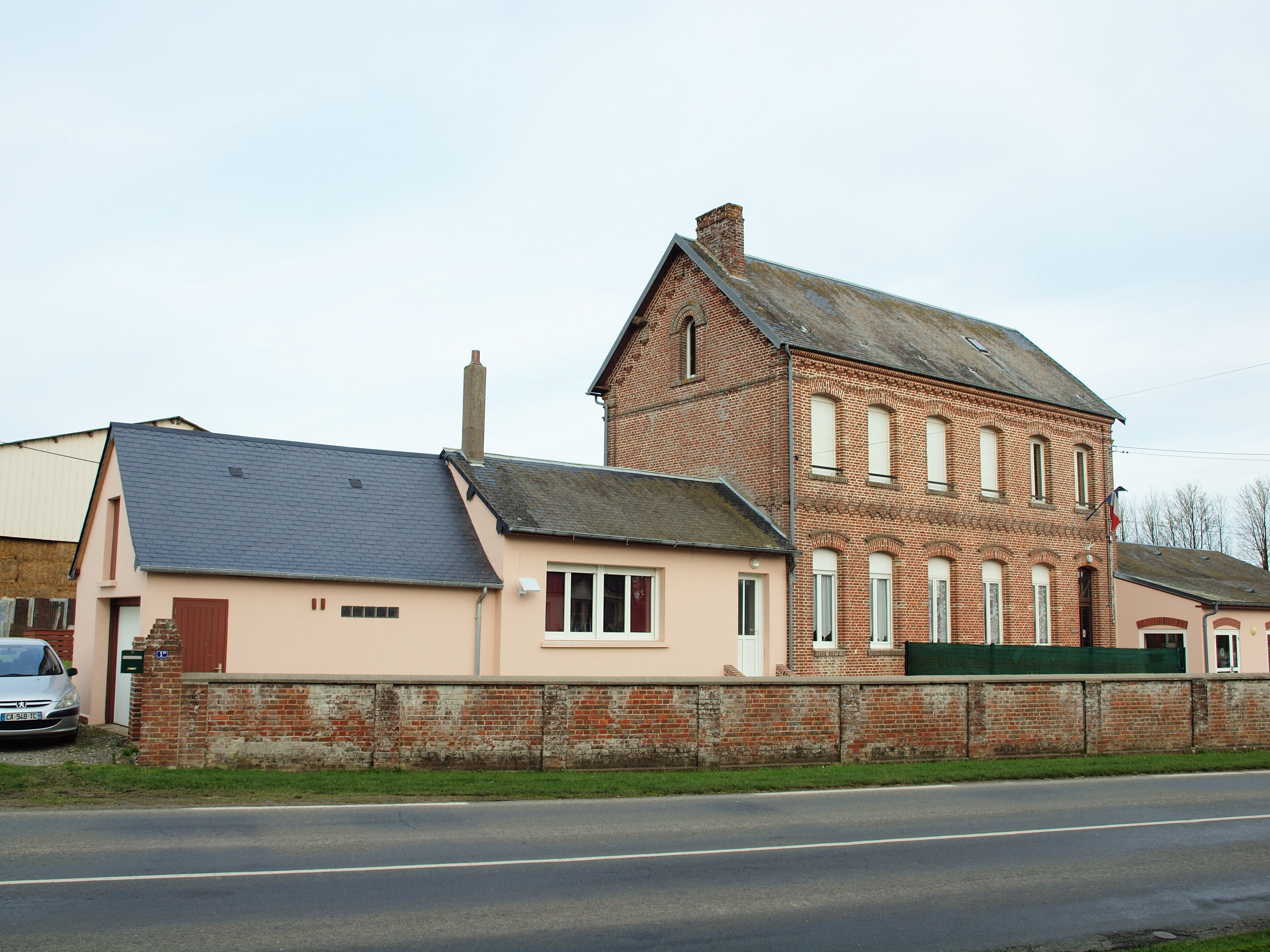
- The town hall in Monceaux-l'Abbaye
- Location of Monceaux-l'Abbaye
- Location within France Location within Hauts-de-France
- Coordinates: 49°39′07″N 1°47′34″E
- Country: France
- Region: Hauts-de-France
- Department: Oise
- Arrondissement: Beauvais
- Canton: Grandvilliers
- Intercommunality: Picardie Verte

Government
  - Mayor (2020–2026): Pascal Bouteleux
- Area^{1}: 4.57 km^{2} (1.76 sq mi)
- Elevation: 215 m (705 ft)
- Highest elevation: 219 m (719 ft)
- Lowest elevation: 190 m (620 ft)
- Population (2023): 211
  - Density: 46.2/km^{2} (120/sq mi)
- Time zone: UTC+01:00 (CET)
  - Summer (DST): UTC+02:00 (CEST)
- INSEE/Postal code: 60407 /60220
- ^{1} French Land Register data, which excludes lakes, ponds, glaciers > 1 km^{2} (0.386 sq mi or 247 acres) and river estuaries.

Monceaux-l'Abbaye (French pronunciation: [mɔ̃so labei]) is a commune in the Oise department in northern France.

== See also ==
- Communes of the Oise department
