= Talmontiers =

- Commune
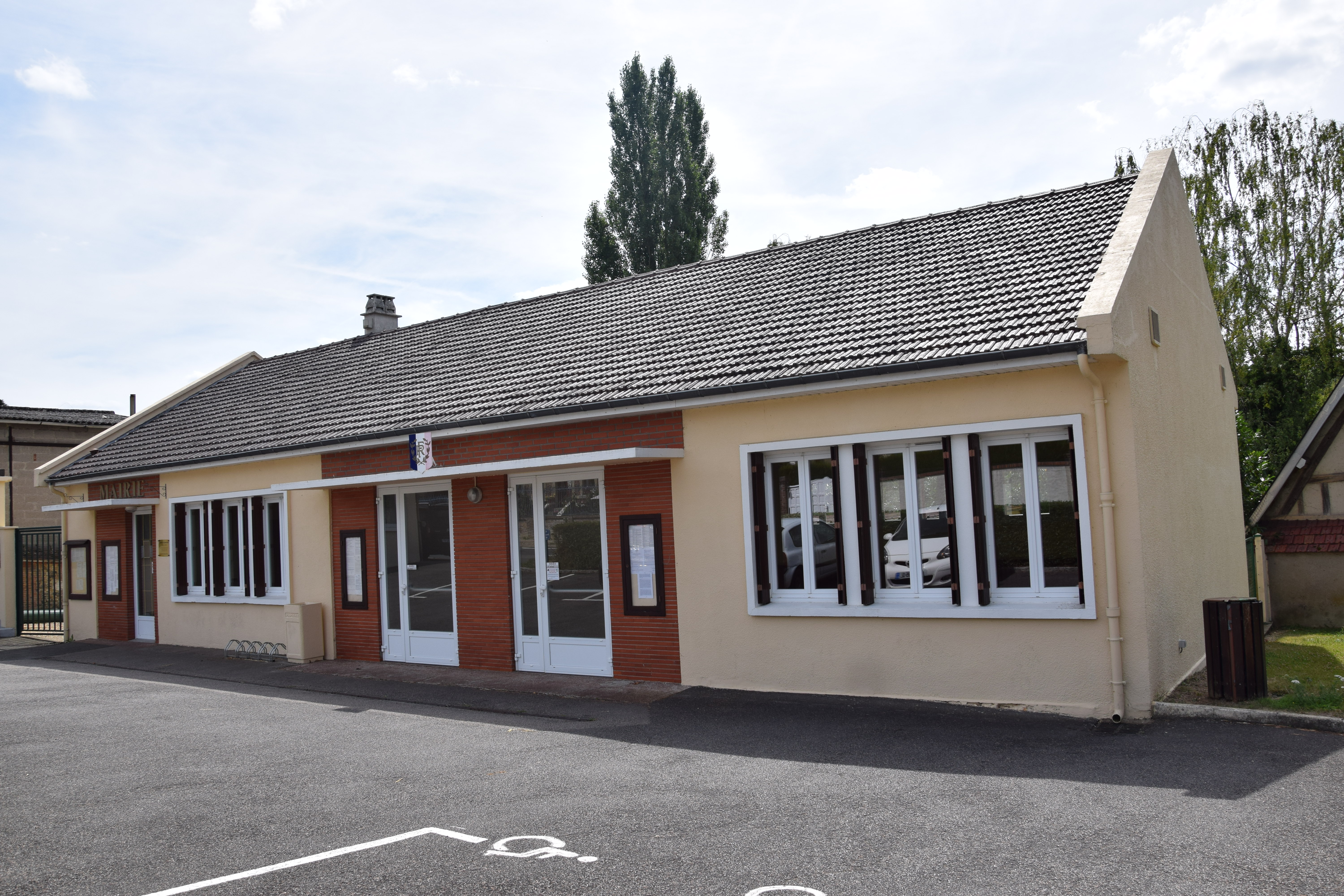
- The town hall in Talmontiers

- Coat of arms
- Location of Talmontiers
- Location within France Location within Hauts-de-France
- Coordinates: 49°23′14″N 1°44′23″E
- Country: France
- Region: Hauts-de-France
- Department: Oise
- Arrondissement: Beauvais
- Canton: Grandvilliers
- Intercommunality: Pays de Bray

Government
  - Mayor (2020–2026): Brigitte Cochet
- Area^{1}: 9.23 km^{2} (3.56 sq mi)
- Elevation: 150 m (490 ft)
- Highest elevation: 202 m (663 ft)
- Lowest elevation: 67 m (220 ft)
- Population (2023): 643
  - Density: 69.7/km^{2} (180/sq mi)
- Time zone: UTC+01:00 (CET)
  - Summer (DST): UTC+02:00 (CEST)
- INSEE/Postal code: 60626 /60590
- ^{1} French Land Register data, which excludes lakes, ponds, glaciers > 1 km^{2} (0.386 sq mi or 247 acres) and river estuaries.

Talmontiers (French pronunciation: [talmɔ̃tje]) is a commune in the Oise department in northern France.

== See also ==
- Communes of the Oise department
