= Blacourt =

- Commune
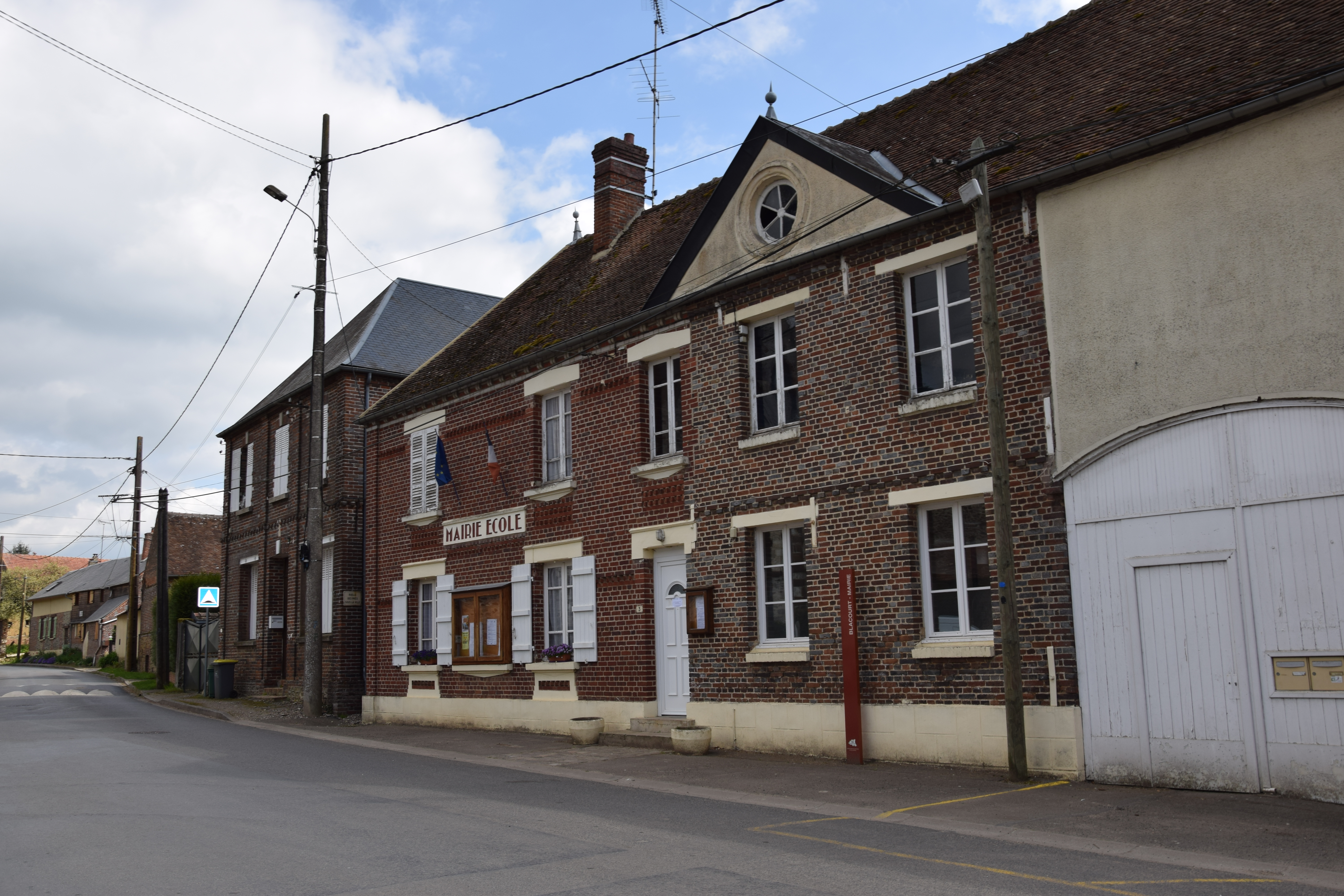
- The town hall in Blacourt
- Location of Blacourt
- Location within France Location within Hauts-de-France
- Coordinates: 49°27′48″N 1°51′32″E
- Country: France
- Region: Hauts-de-France
- Department: Oise
- Arrondissement: Beauvais
- Canton: Grandvilliers
- Intercommunality: Pays de Bray

Government
  - Mayor (2020–2026): Jean-Pierre Fouquier
- Area^{1}: 11.49 km^{2} (4.44 sq mi)
- Elevation: 100 m (330 ft)
- Highest elevation: 172 m (564 ft)
- Lowest elevation: 87 m (285 ft)
- Population (2023): 592
  - Density: 51.5/km^{2} (133/sq mi)
- Time zone: UTC+01:00 (CET)
  - Summer (DST): UTC+02:00 (CEST)
- INSEE/Postal code: 60073 /60650
- ^{1} French Land Register data, which excludes lakes, ponds, glaciers > 1 km^{2} (0.386 sq mi or 247 acres) and river estuaries.

Blacourt (French pronunciation: [blakuʁ]) is a commune in the Oise department in northern France.

== Population ==
Historical population
| Year | Pop. | ±% p.a. |
|---|---|---|
| 1968 | 283 | — |
| 1975 | 285 | +0.10% |
| 1982 | 352 | +3.06% |
| 1990 | 371 | +0.66% |
| 1999 | 410 | +1.12% |
| 2007 | 488 | +2.20% |
| 2012 | 588 | +3.80% |
| 2017 | 602 | +0.47% |
| 2023 | 592 | −0.28% |
Source: INSEE

== See also ==
- Communes of the Oise department
