= Haucourt, Oise =

Haucourt
- Commune
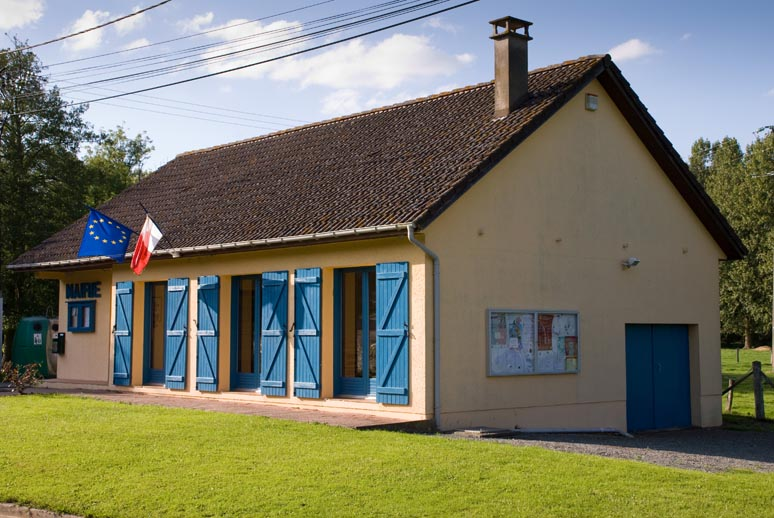
- The town hall in Haucourt
- Location of Haucourt
- Location within France Location within Hauts-de-France
- Coordinates: 49°30′49″N 1°56′20″E
- Country: France
- Region: Hauts-de-France
- Department: Oise
- Arrondissement: Beauvais
- Canton: Grandvilliers
- Intercommunality: Picardie Verte

Government
  - Mayor (2020–2026): Laurent Inglard
- Area^{1}: 3.88 km^{2} (1.50 sq mi)
- Elevation: 66 m (217 ft)
- Highest elevation: 179 m (587 ft)
- Lowest elevation: 87 m (285 ft)
- Population (2023): 133
  - Density: 34.3/km^{2} (88.8/sq mi)
- Time zone: UTC+01:00 (CET)
  - Summer (DST): UTC+02:00 (CEST)
- INSEE/Postal code: 60301 /60112
- ^{1} French Land Register data, which excludes lakes, ponds, glaciers > 1 km^{2} (0.386 sq mi or 247 acres) and river estuaries.

Haucourt (French pronunciation: [okuʁ]) is a commune in the Oise department in northern France.

== See also ==
- Communes of the Oise department
