= Mortefontaine =

Mortefontaine is the name or part of the name of several communes in France:

- Mortefontaine, Aisne, in the Aisne département
- Mortefontaine, Oise, in the Oise département
- Mortefontaine-en-Thelle, in the Oise département
