= Cauvigny =

- Commune
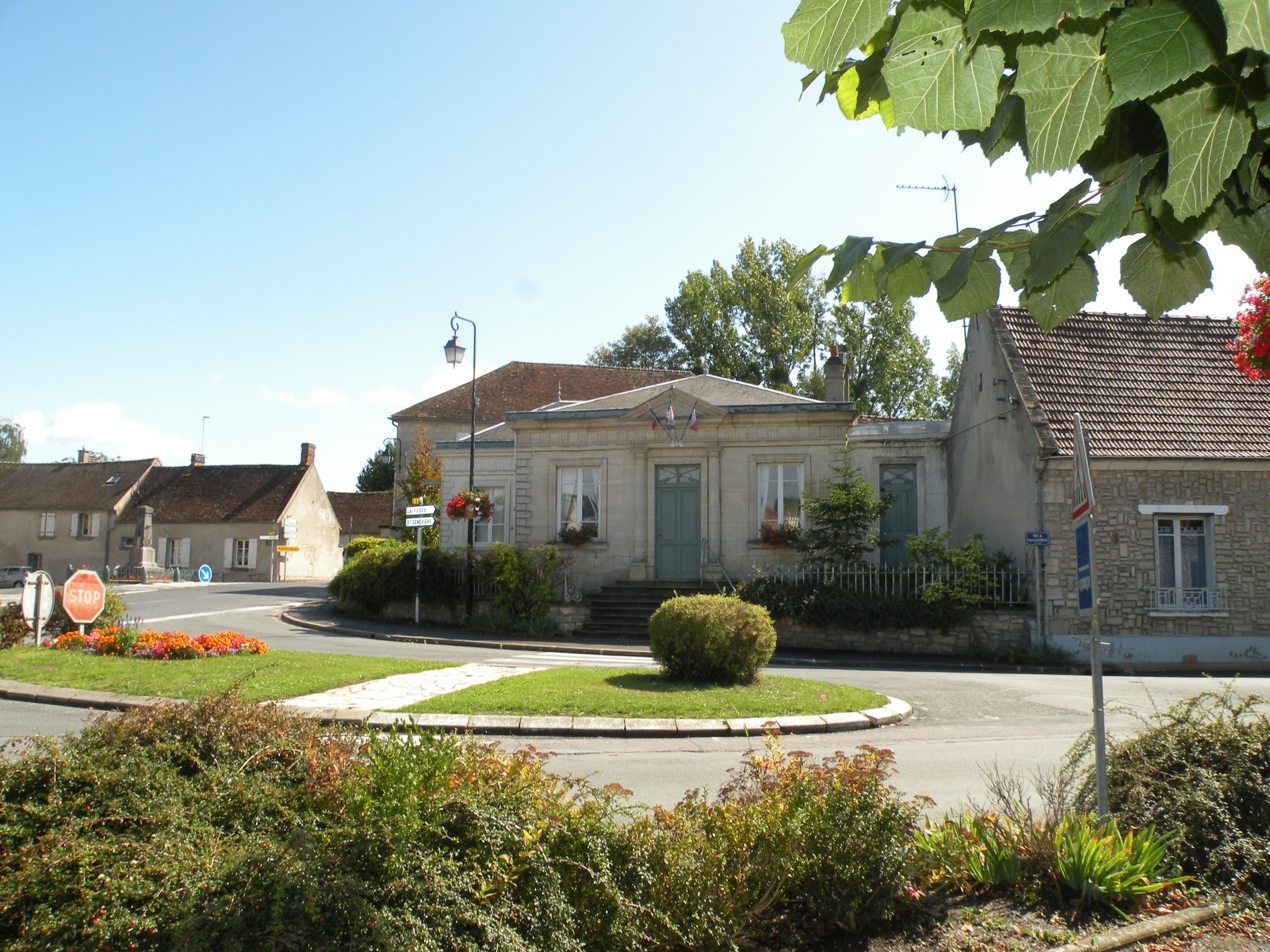
- The town hall in Cauvigny
- Location of Cauvigny
- Location within France Location within Hauts-de-France
- Coordinates: 49°18′06″N 2°14′58″E
- Country: France
- Region: Hauts-de-France
- Department: Oise
- Arrondissement: Beauvais
- Canton: Chaumont-en-Vexin

Government
  - Mayor (2020–2026): Francis Chable
- Area^{1}: 17.5 km^{2} (6.8 sq mi)
- Elevation: 110 m (360 ft)
- Highest elevation: 208 m (682 ft)
- Lowest elevation: 67 m (220 ft)
- Population (2023): 1,669
  - Density: 95.4/km^{2} (247/sq mi)
- Time zone: UTC+01:00 (CET)
  - Summer (DST): UTC+02:00 (CEST)
- INSEE/Postal code: 60135 /60730
- ^{1} French Land Register data, which excludes lakes, ponds, glaciers > 1 km^{2} (0.386 sq mi or 247 acres) and river estuaries.

Cauvigny (French pronunciation: [koviɲi]) is a commune in the Oise department in northern France.

== See also ==
- Communes of the Oise department
