= Boubiers =

- Commune
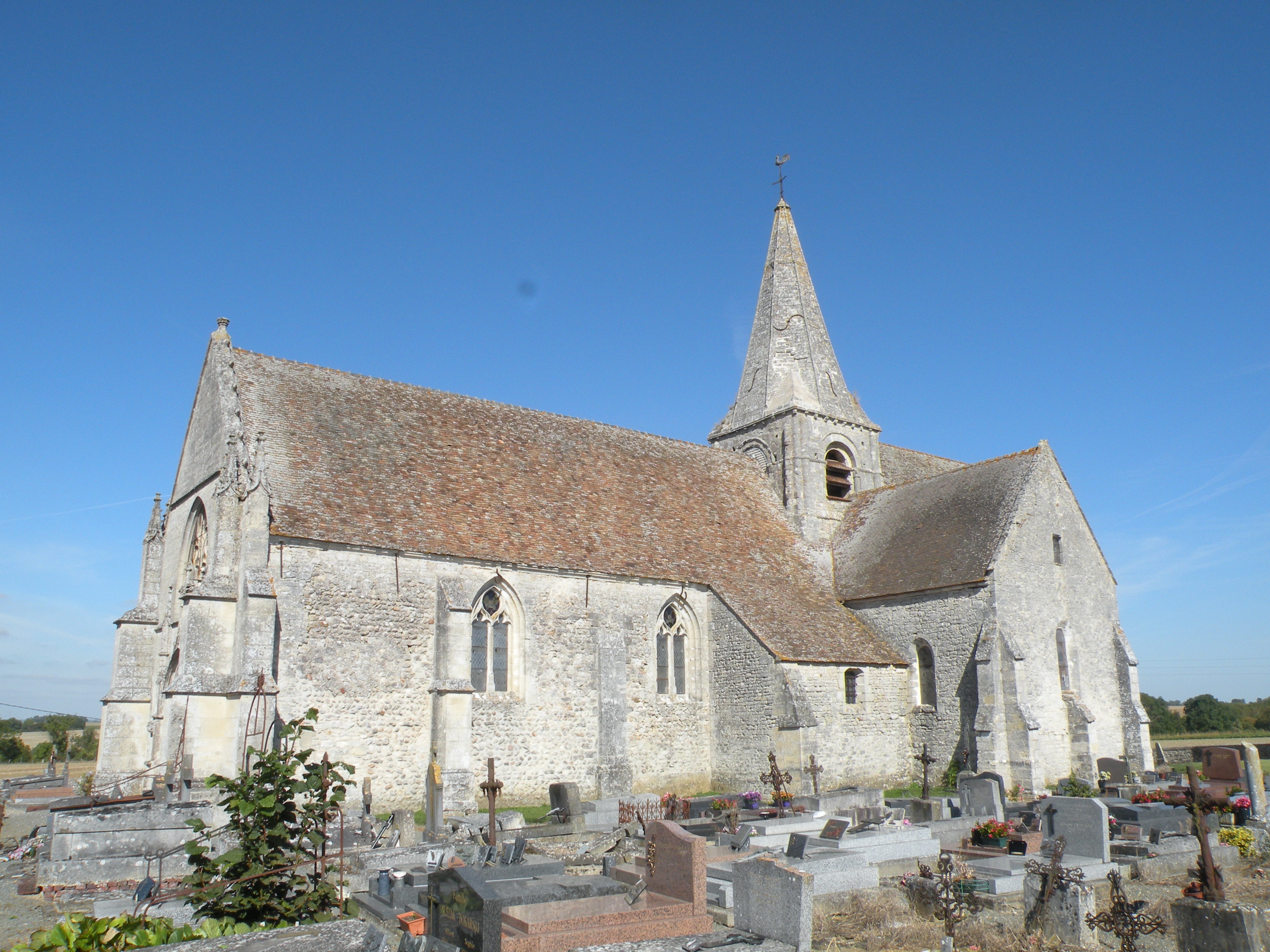
- The church in Boubiers
- Location of Boubiers
- Location within France Location within Hauts-de-France
- Coordinates: 49°13′18″N 1°52′14″E
- Country: France
- Region: Hauts-de-France
- Department: Oise
- Arrondissement: Beauvais
- Canton: Chaumont-en-Vexin
- Intercommunality: Vexin Thelle

Government
  - Mayor (2020–2026): Sophie Levesque
- Area^{1}: 10.35 km^{2} (4.00 sq mi)
- Elevation: 122 m (400 ft)
- Highest elevation: 136 m (446 ft)
- Lowest elevation: 82 m (269 ft)
- Population (2023): 382
  - Density: 36.9/km^{2} (95.6/sq mi)
- Time zone: UTC+01:00 (CET)
  - Summer (DST): UTC+02:00 (CEST)
- INSEE/Postal code: 60089 /60240
- ^{1} French Land Register data, which excludes lakes, ponds, glaciers > 1 km^{2} (0.386 sq mi or 247 acres) and river estuaries.

Boubiers (French pronunciation: [bubje]) is a commune in the Oise department in northern France.

== Population ==
Historical population
Year	Pop.	±% p.a.
1968	291	—
1975	252	−2.03%
1982	255	+0.17%
1990	320	+2.88%
1999	370	+1.63%
2007	366	−0.14%
2012	442	+3.85%
2017	412	−1.40%
2023	382	−1.25%
Source: INSEE

== See also ==
- Communes of the Oise department
