= Tourly =

- Commune
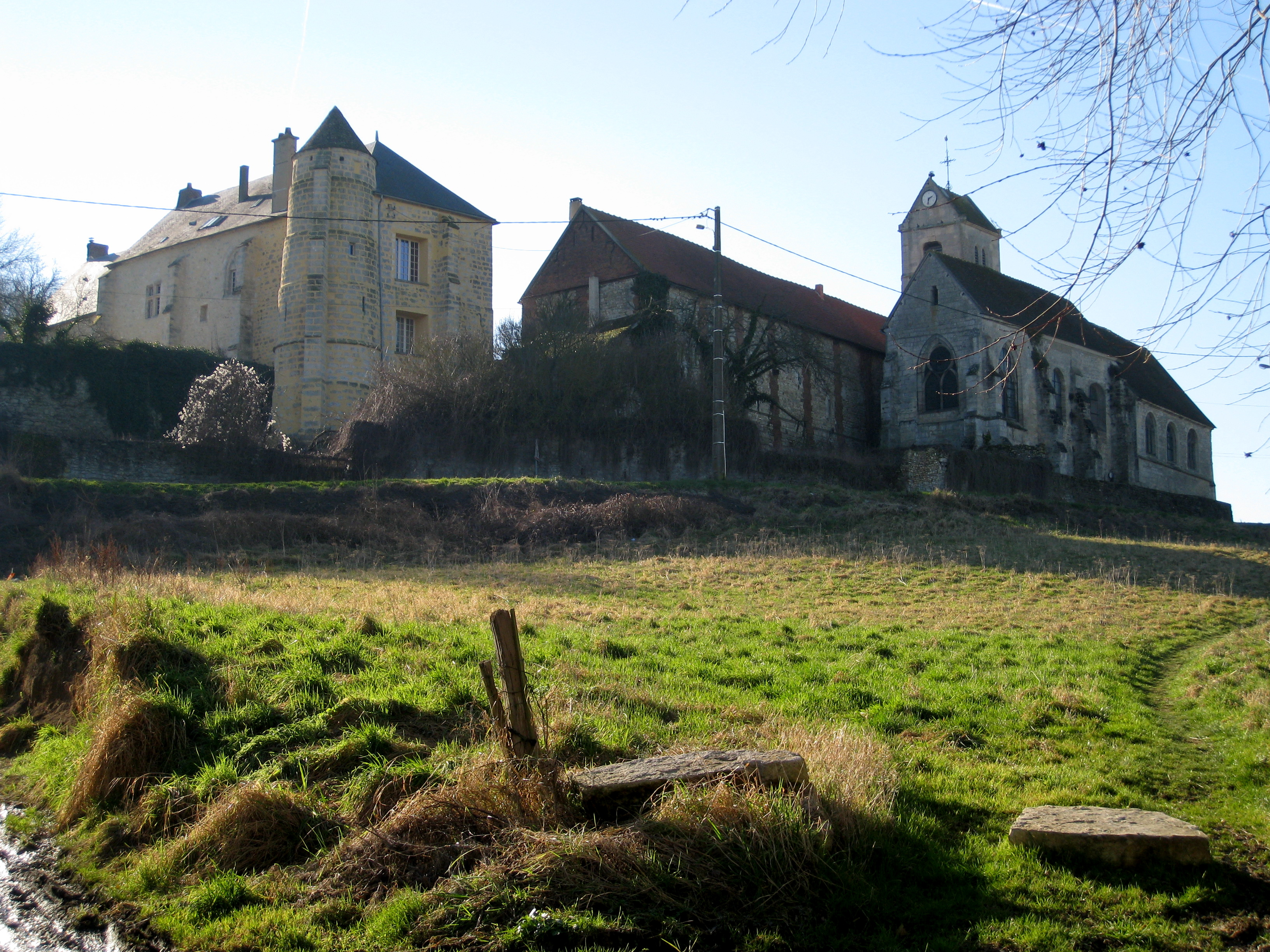
- Château and church
- Location of Tourly
- Location within France Location within Hauts-de-France
- Coordinates: 49°13′30″N 1°56′52″E
- Country: France
- Region: Hauts-de-France
- Department: Oise
- Arrondissement: Beauvais
- Canton: Chaumont-en-Vexin
- Intercommunality: Vexin Thelle

Government
  - Mayor (2020–2026): Jean-Jacques Godard
- Area^{1}: 3.32 km^{2} (1.28 sq mi)
- Highest elevation: 134 m (440 ft)
- Lowest elevation: 66 m (217 ft)
- Population (2023): 161
  - Density: 48.5/km^{2} (126/sq mi)
- Time zone: UTC+01:00 (CET)
  - Summer (DST): UTC+02:00 (CEST)
- INSEE/Postal code: 60640 /60240
- ^{1} French Land Register data, which excludes lakes, ponds, glaciers > 1 km^{2} (0.386 sq mi or 247 acres) and river estuaries.

Tourly (French pronunciation: [tuʁli]) is a commune in the Oise department in northern France.

== See also ==
- Communes of the Oise department
