= Thibivillers =

- Commune
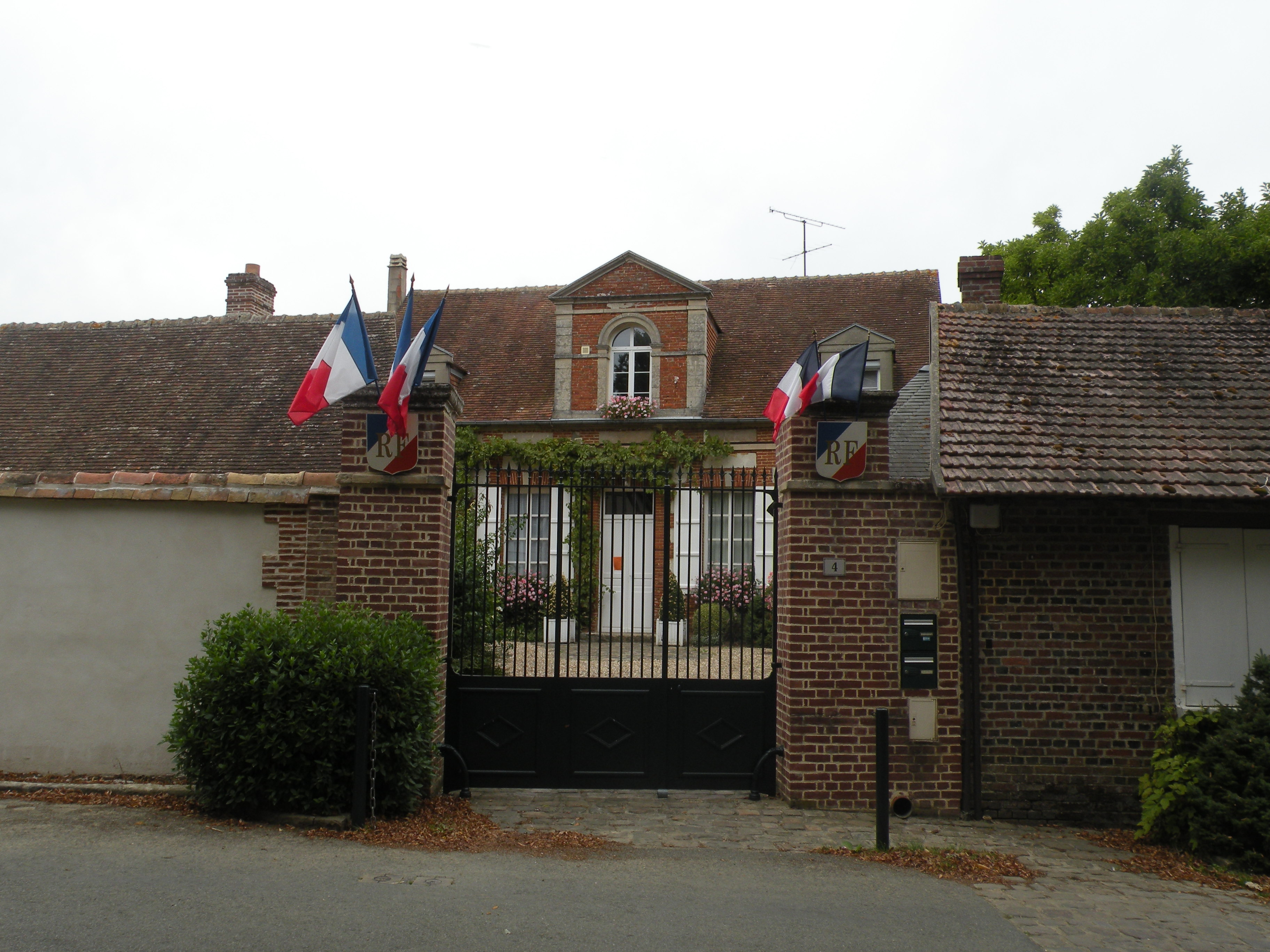
- The town hall in Thibivillers
- Location of Thibivillers
- Location within France Location within Hauts-de-France
- Coordinates: 49°18′09″N 1°54′03″E
- Country: France
- Region: Hauts-de-France
- Department: Oise
- Arrondissement: Beauvais
- Canton: Chaumont-en-Vexin
- Intercommunality: Vexin Thelle

Government
  - Mayor (2020–2026): Yannick Michel Jubault
- Area^{1}: 6.35 km^{2} (2.45 sq mi)
- Elevation: 85 m (279 ft)
- Highest elevation: 156 m (512 ft)
- Lowest elevation: 86 m (282 ft)
- Population (2023): 217
  - Density: 34.2/km^{2} (88.5/sq mi)
- Time zone: UTC+01:00 (CET)
  - Summer (DST): UTC+02:00 (CEST)
- INSEE/Postal code: 60630 /60240
- ^{1} French Land Register data, which excludes lakes, ponds, glaciers > 1 km^{2} (0.386 sq mi or 247 acres) and river estuaries.

Thibivillers is a commune in the Oise department in northern France.

== See also ==
- Communes of the Oise department
