= Senots =

- Commune
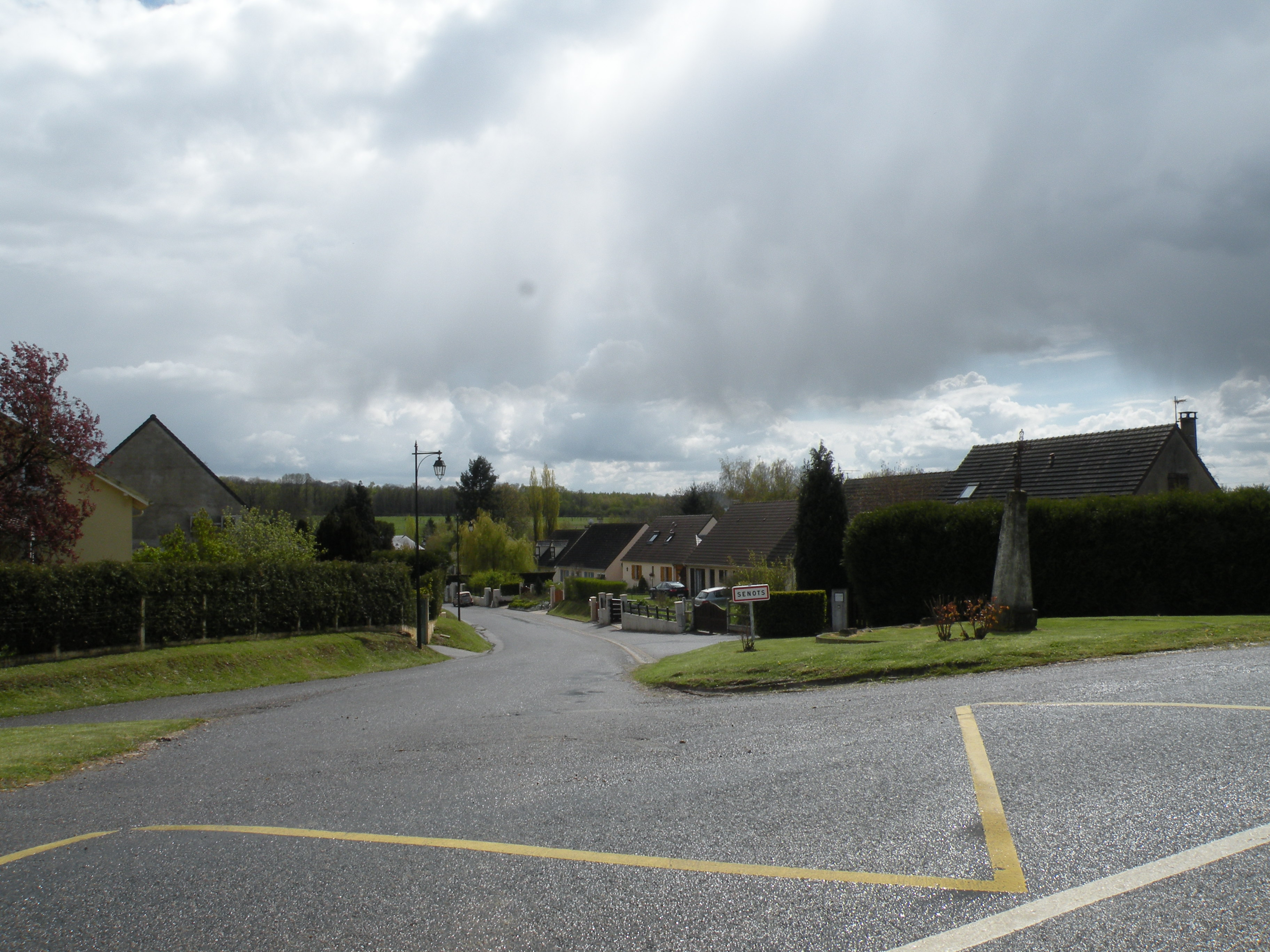
- The road into Senots
- Location of Senots
- Location within France Location within Hauts-de-France
- Coordinates: 49°15′52″N 1°59′35″E
- Country: France
- Region: Hauts-de-France
- Department: Oise
- Arrondissement: Beauvais
- Canton: Chaumont-en-Vexin
- Intercommunality: Vexin Thelle

Government
  - Mayor (2020–2026): Carole Gautier
- Area^{1}: 6.25 km^{2} (2.41 sq mi)
- Elevation: 79 m (259 ft)
- Highest elevation: 147 m (482 ft)
- Lowest elevation: 87 m (285 ft)
- Population (2023): 331
  - Density: 53.0/km^{2} (137/sq mi)
- Time zone: UTC+01:00 (CET)
  - Summer (DST): UTC+02:00 (CEST)
- INSEE/Postal code: 60613 /60240
- ^{1} French Land Register data, which excludes lakes, ponds, glaciers > 1 km^{2} (0.386 sq mi or 247 acres) and river estuaries.

Senots (French pronunciation: [səno]) is a commune in the Oise department, in northern France.

== See also ==
- Communes of the Oise department
