= Lavilletertre =

- Commune
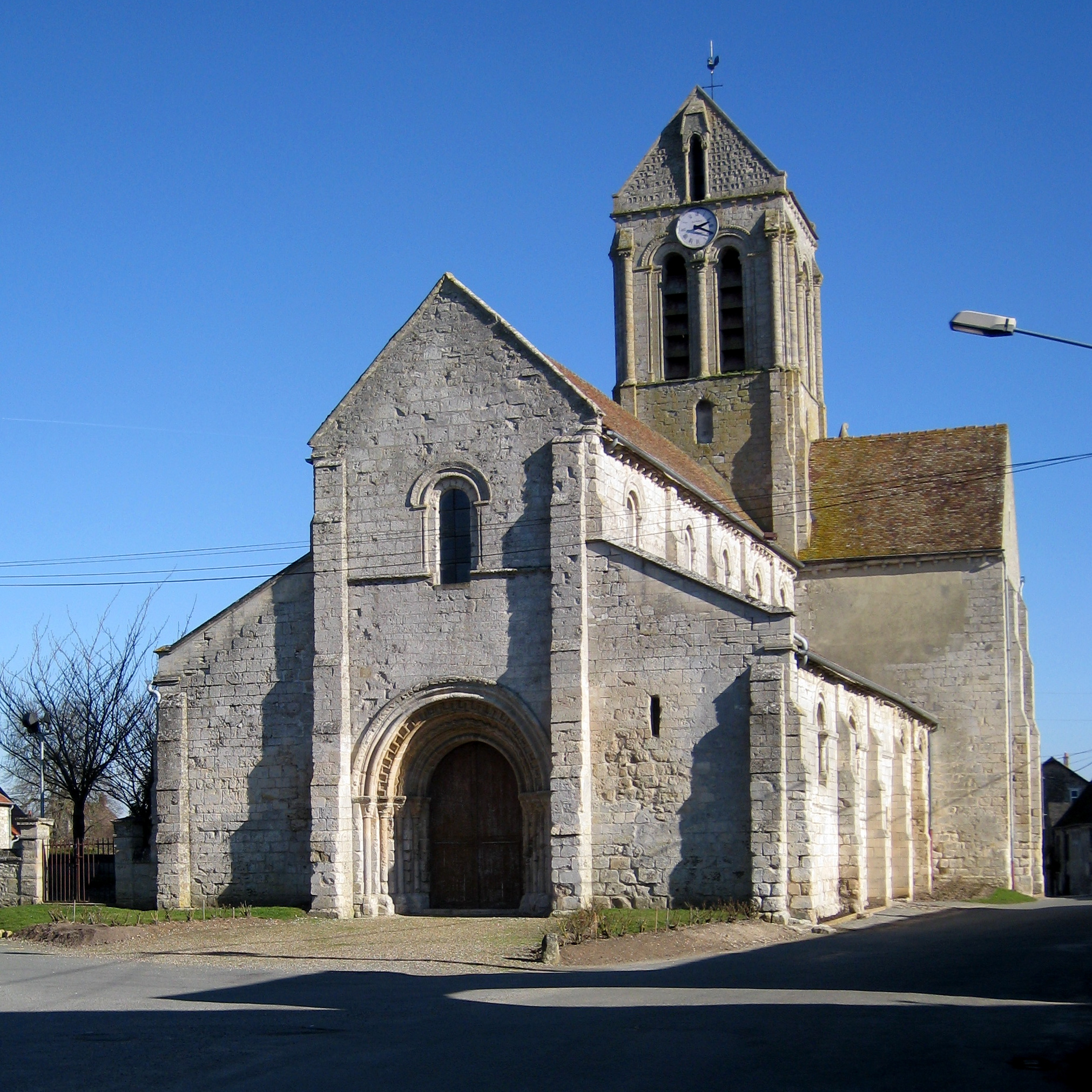
- The church in Lavilletertre

- Coat of arms
- Location of Lavilletertre
- Location within France Location within Hauts-de-France
- Coordinates: 49°11′48″N 1°55′49″E
- Country: France
- Region: Hauts-de-France
- Department: Oise
- Arrondissement: Beauvais
- Canton: Chaumont-en-Vexin
- Intercommunality: Vexin Thelle

Government
  - Mayor (2020–2026): Hervé Dessein
- Area^{1}: 16.22 km^{2} (6.26 sq mi)
- Elevation: 92 m (302 ft)
- Highest elevation: 133 m (436 ft)
- Lowest elevation: 62 m (203 ft)
- Population (2023): 631
  - Density: 38.9/km^{2} (101/sq mi)
- Time zone: UTC+01:00 (CET)
  - Summer (DST): UTC+02:00 (CEST)
- INSEE/Postal code: 60356 /60240
- ^{1} French Land Register data, which excludes lakes, ponds, glaciers > 1 km^{2} (0.386 sq mi or 247 acres) and river estuaries.

Lavilletertre (French pronunciation: [laviltɛʁtʁ]) is a commune in the Oise department in northern France.

== See also ==
- Communes of the Oise department
