= Boutencourt =

- Commune
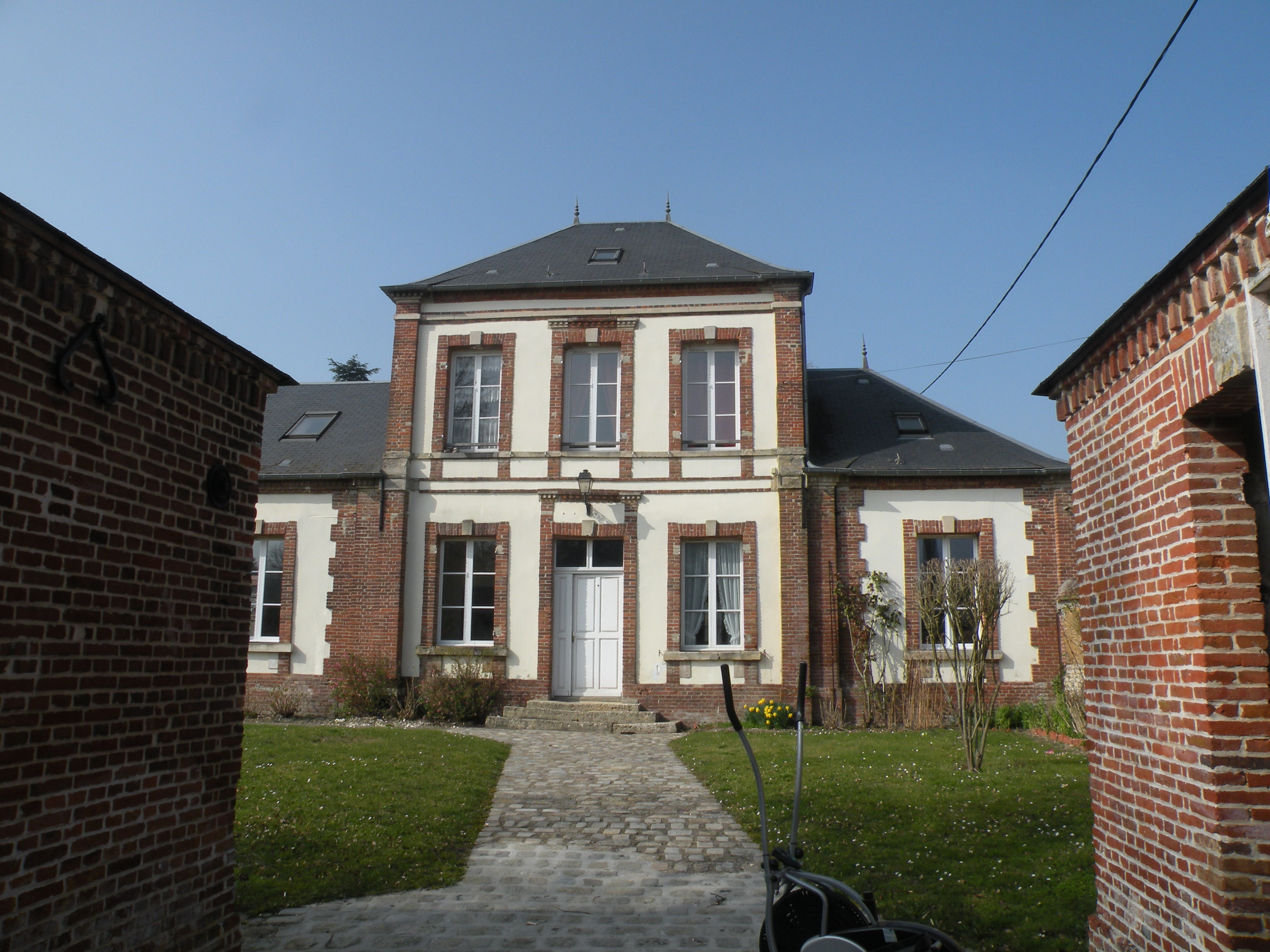
- The town hall in Boutencourt
- Location of Boutencourt
- Location within France Location within Hauts-de-France
- Coordinates: 49°19′15″N 1°51′34″E
- Country: France
- Region: Hauts-de-France
- Department: Oise
- Arrondissement: Beauvais
- Canton: Chaumont-en-Vexin
- Intercommunality: Vexin Thelle

Government
  - Mayor (2020–2026): Joseph Lefever
- Area^{1}: 7.51 km^{2} (2.90 sq mi)
- Elevation: 100 m (330 ft)
- Highest elevation: 163 m (535 ft)
- Lowest elevation: 78 m (256 ft)
- Population (2023): 213
  - Density: 28.4/km^{2} (73.5/sq mi)
- Time zone: UTC+01:00 (CET)
  - Summer (DST): UTC+02:00 (CEST)
- INSEE/Postal code: 60097 /60590
- ^{1} French Land Register data, which excludes lakes, ponds, glaciers > 1 km^{2} (0.386 sq mi or 247 acres) and river estuaries.

Boutencourt (French pronunciation: [butɑ̃kuʁ]) is a commune in the Oise department in northern France.

== Population ==
Historical population
Year	Pop.	±% p.a.
1968	176	—
1975	144	−2.83%
1982	141	−0.30%
1990	173	+2.59%
1999	204	+1.85%
2007	250	+2.57%
2012	245	−0.40%
2017	220	−2.13%
2023	213	−0.54%
Source: INSEE

== See also ==
- Communes of the Oise department
