= Valdampierre =

- Commune
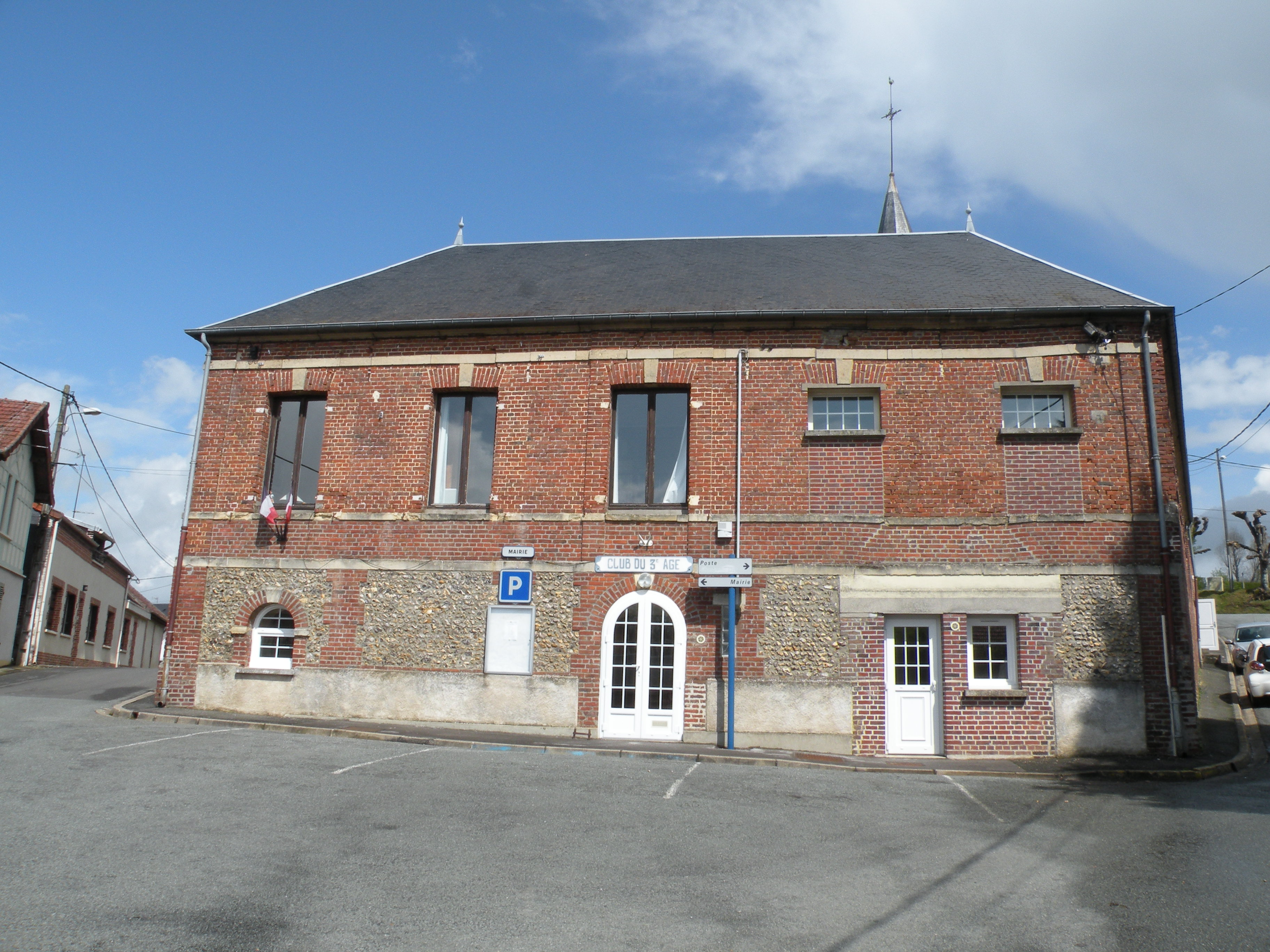
- The town hall in Valdampierre

- Coat of arms
- Location of Valdampierre
- Location within France Location within Hauts-de-France
- Coordinates: 49°18′13″N 2°03′11″E
- Country: France
- Region: Hauts-de-France
- Department: Oise
- Arrondissement: Beauvais
- Canton: Chaumont-en-Vexin
- Intercommunality: Sablons

Government
  - Mayor (2020–2026): Eddie Vandenabeele
- Area^{1}: 8.67 km^{2} (3.35 sq mi)
- Elevation: 190 m (620 ft)
- Highest elevation: 226 m (741 ft)
- Lowest elevation: 126 m (413 ft)
- Population (2023): 941
  - Density: 109/km^{2} (281/sq mi)
- Time zone: UTC+01:00 (CET)
  - Summer (DST): UTC+02:00 (CEST)
- INSEE/Postal code: 60652 /60790
- ^{1} French Land Register data, which excludes lakes, ponds, glaciers > 1 km^{2} (0.386 sq mi or 247 acres) and river estuaries.

Valdampierre (French pronunciation: [valdɑ̃pjɛʁ]) is a commune in the Oise department in northern France.

== Population ==
Historical population
Year	Pop.	±% p.a.
1968	364	—
1975	304	−2.54%
1982	639	+11.20%
1990	829	+3.31%
1999	880	+0.67%
2007	900	+0.28%
2012	937	+0.81%
2017	936	−0.02%
2023	941	+0.09%
Source: INSEE

== See also ==
- Communes of the Oise department
