= Novillers =

- Commune
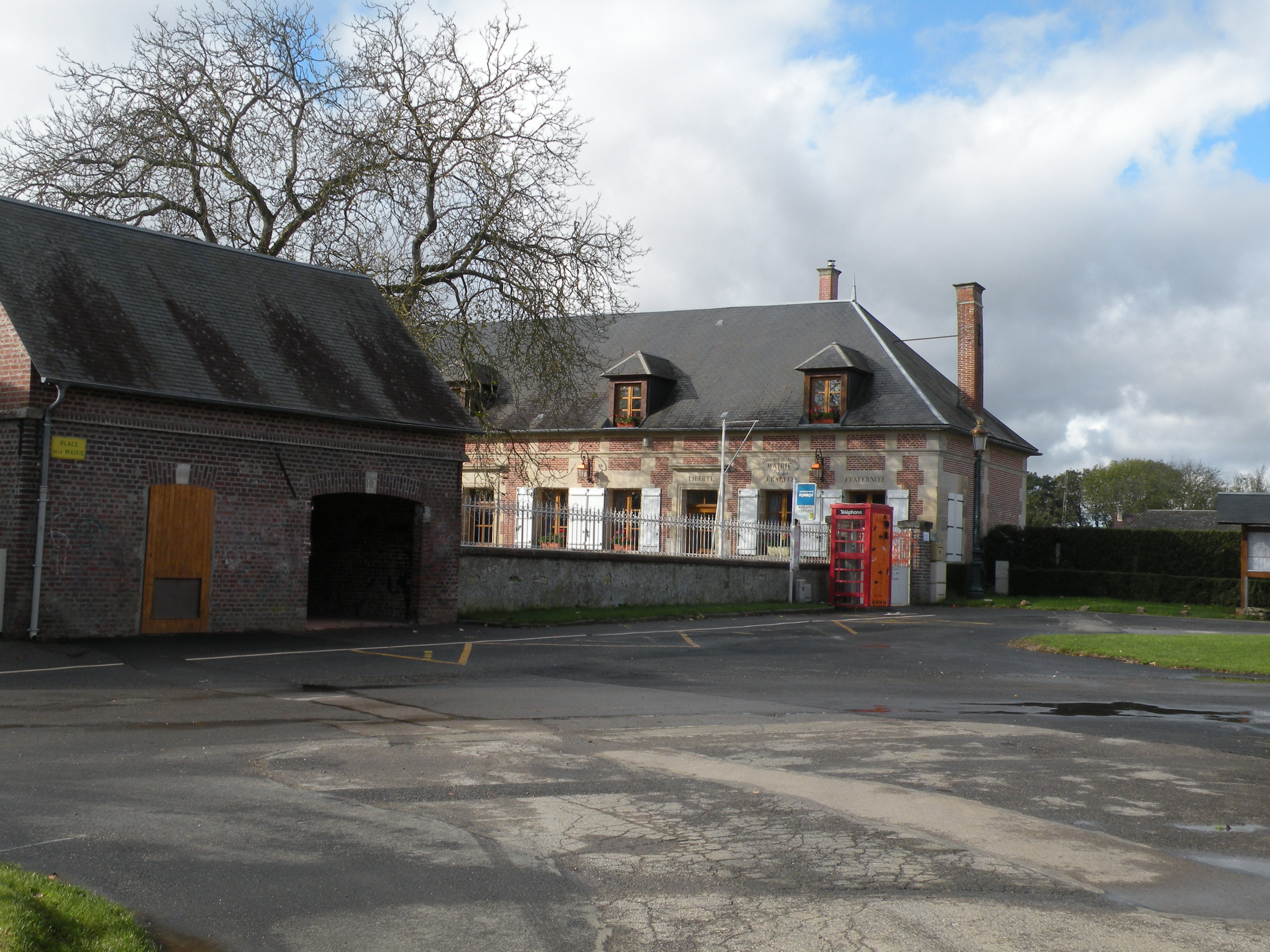
- The town hall in Novillers
- Location of Novillers
- Location within France Location within Hauts-de-France
- Coordinates: 49°16′20″N 2°12′55″E
- Country: France
- Region: Hauts-de-France
- Department: Oise
- Arrondissement: Beauvais
- Canton: Chaumont-en-Vexin

Government
  - Mayor (2020–2026): Thierry Devillard
- Area^{1}: 4.79 km^{2} (1.85 sq mi)
- Elevation: 186 m (610 ft)
- Highest elevation: 206 m (676 ft)
- Lowest elevation: 113 m (371 ft)
- Population (2023): 392
  - Density: 81.8/km^{2} (212/sq mi)
- Time zone: UTC+01:00 (CET)
  - Summer (DST): UTC+02:00 (CEST)
- INSEE/Postal code: 60469 /60730
- ^{1} French Land Register data, which excludes lakes, ponds, glaciers > 1 km^{2} (0.386 sq mi or 247 acres) and river estuaries.

Novillers is a commune in the Oise department in northern France.

== See also ==
- Communes of the Oise department
