= Hadancourt-le-Haut-Clocher =

- Commune
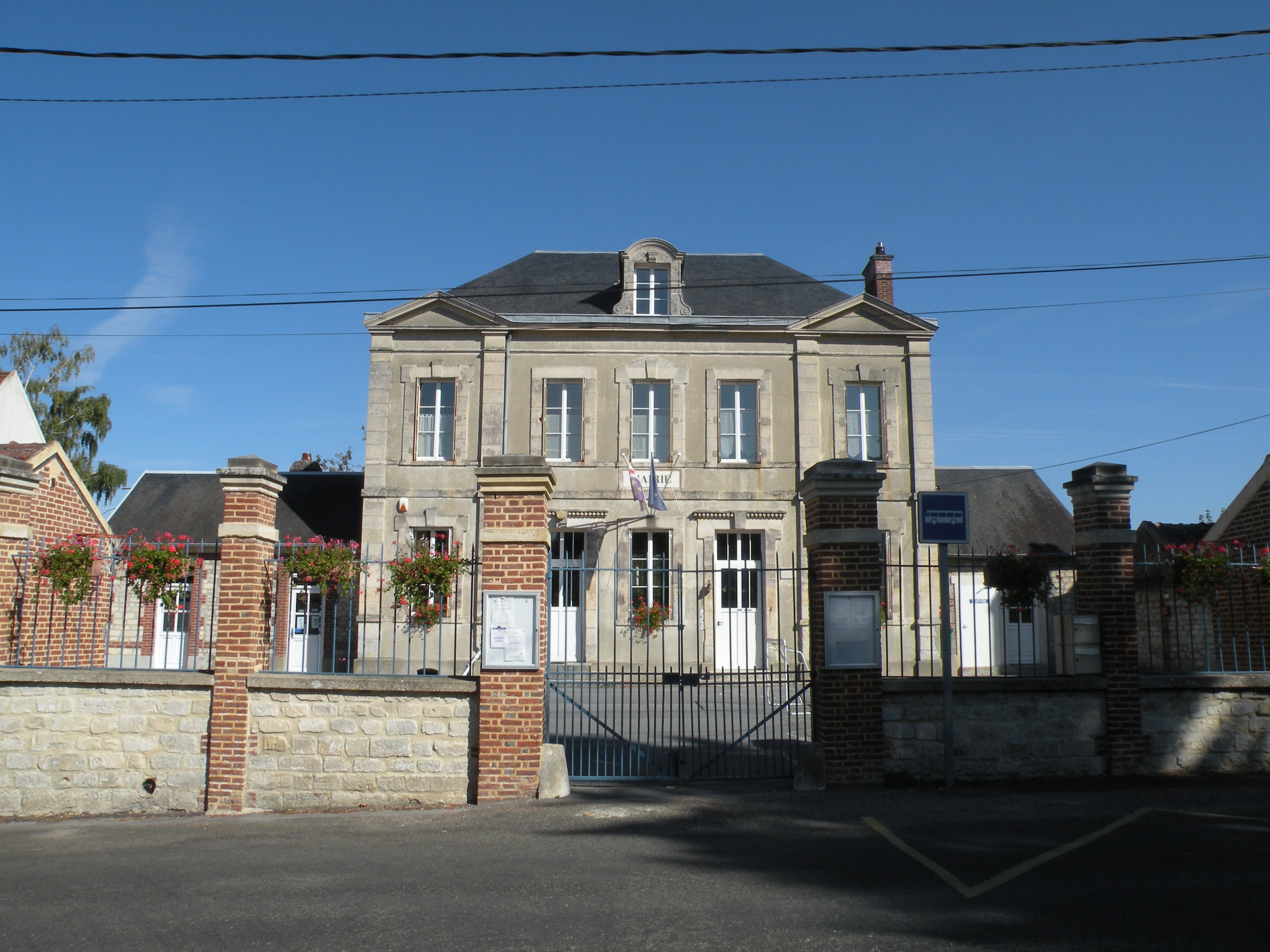
- The town hall in Hadancourt-le-Haut-Clocher
- Location of Hadancourt-le-Haut-Clocher
- Location within France Location within Hauts-de-France
- Coordinates: 49°11′07″N 1°51′26″E
- Country: France
- Region: Hauts-de-France
- Department: Oise
- Arrondissement: Beauvais
- Canton: Chaumont-en-Vexin
- Intercommunality: Vexin-Thelle

Government
  - Mayor (2020–2026): Michel Letailleur
- Area^{1}: 8.67 km^{2} (3.35 sq mi)
- Elevation: 150 m (490 ft)
- Highest elevation: 207 m (679 ft)
- Lowest elevation: 109 m (358 ft)
- Population (2023): 376
  - Density: 43.4/km^{2} (112/sq mi)
- Time zone: UTC+01:00 (CET)
  - Summer (DST): UTC+02:00 (CEST)
- INSEE/Postal code: 60293 /60240
- ^{1} French Land Register data, which excludes lakes, ponds, glaciers > 1 km^{2} (0.386 sq mi or 247 acres) and river estuaries.

Hadancourt-le-Haut-Clocher (French pronunciation: [adɑ̃kuʁ lə o klɔʃe]) is a commune in the Oise department in northern France.

== Population ==
Historical population
Year	Pop.	±% p.a.
1968	132	—
1975	184	+4.86%
1982	221	+2.65%
1990	304	+4.07%
1999	355	+1.74%
2007	352	−0.11%
2012	362	+0.56%
2017	366	+0.22%
2023	376	+0.45%
Source: INSEE

== See also ==
- Communes of the Oise department
