= Vaudancourt =

- Commune
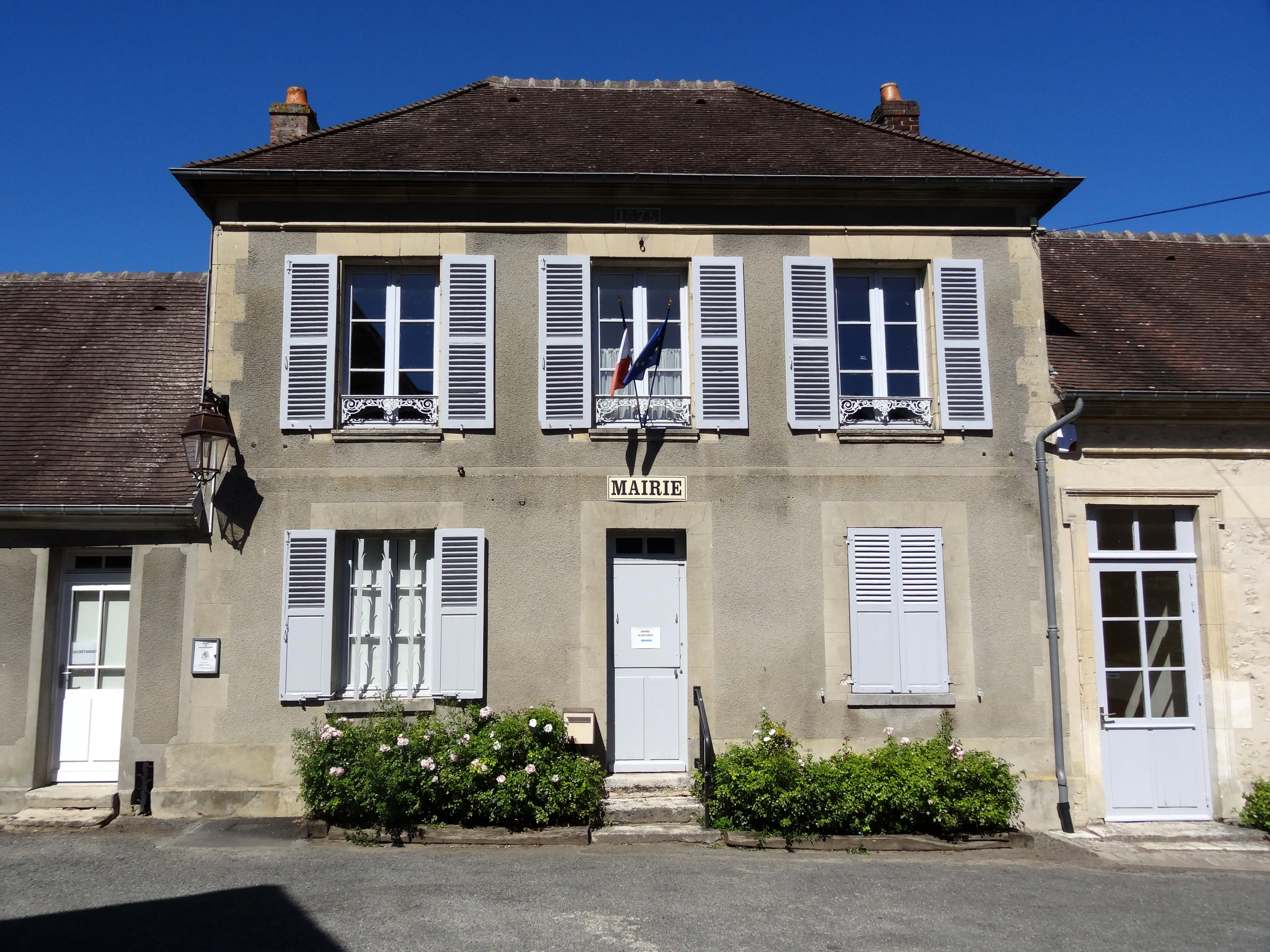
- The town hall in Vaudancourt
- Location of Vaudancourt
- Location within France Location within Hauts-de-France
- Coordinates: 49°14′03″N 1°45′23″E
- Country: France
- Region: Hauts-de-France
- Department: Oise
- Arrondissement: Beauvais
- Canton: Chaumont-en-Vexin
- Intercommunality: Vexin Thelle

Government
  - Mayor (2020–2026): Jean-Michel Colson
- Area^{1}: 4.67 km^{2} (1.80 sq mi)
- Elevation: 135 m (443 ft)
- Highest elevation: 148 m (486 ft)
- Lowest elevation: 63 m (207 ft)
- Population (2023): 159
  - Density: 34.0/km^{2} (88.2/sq mi)
- Time zone: UTC+01:00 (CET)
  - Summer (DST): UTC+02:00 (CEST)
- INSEE/Postal code: 60659 /60240
- ^{1} French Land Register data, which excludes lakes, ponds, glaciers > 1 km^{2} (0.386 sq mi or 247 acres) and river estuaries.

Vaudancourt (French pronunciation: [vodɑ̃kuʁ]) is a commune in the Oise department in northern France.

== See also ==
- Communes of the Oise department
