= Lachapelle-Saint-Pierre =

- Commune
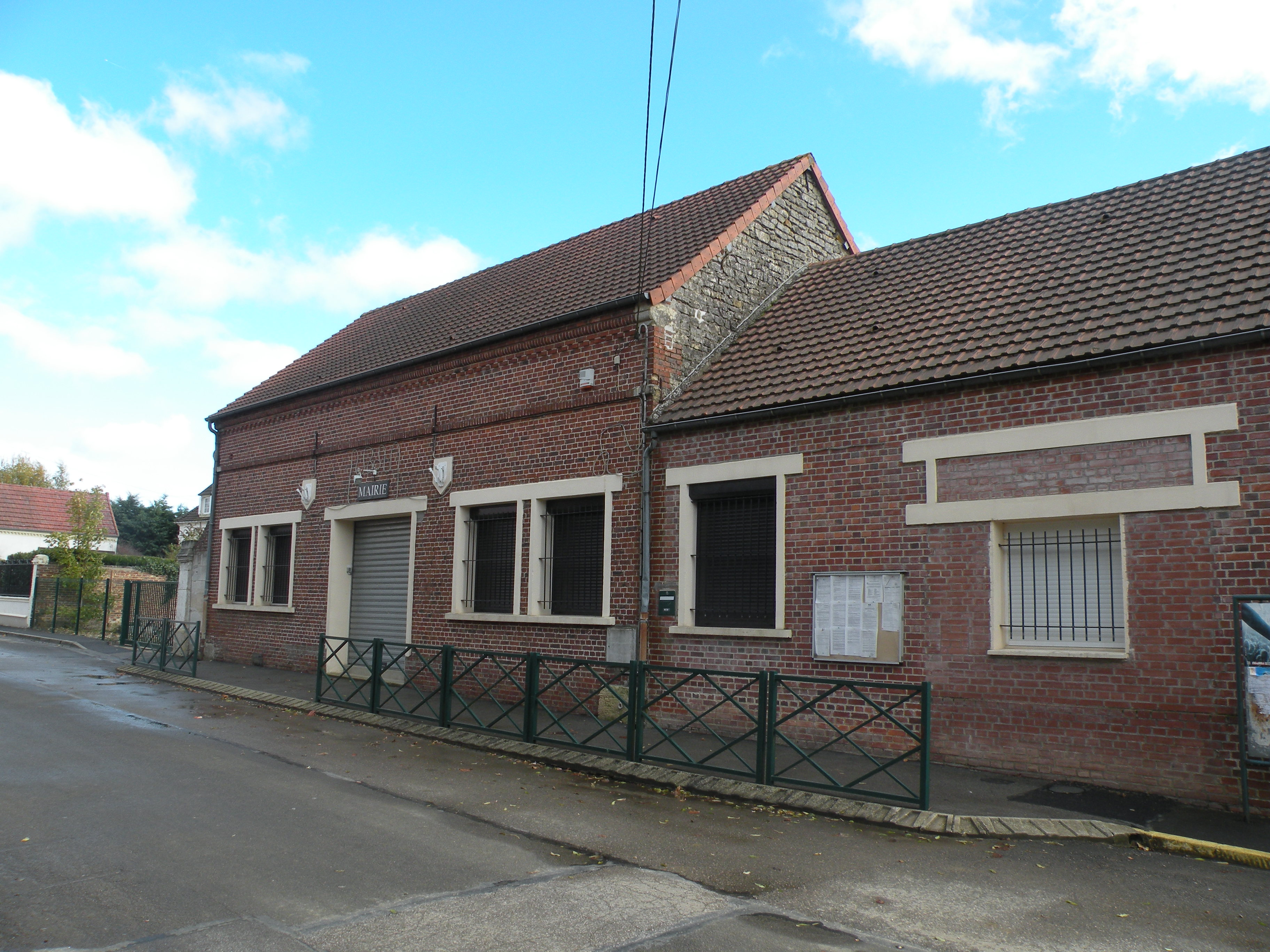
- The town hall in Lachapelle-Saint-Pierre
- Location of Lachapelle-Saint-Pierre
- Location within France Location within Hauts-de-France
- Coordinates: 49°16′13″N 2°14′12″E
- Country: France
- Region: Hauts-de-France
- Department: Oise
- Arrondissement: Beauvais
- Canton: Chaumont-en-Vexin

Government
  - Mayor (2020–2026): Pascal Poulet
- Area^{1}: 4.22 km^{2} (1.63 sq mi)
- Elevation: 182 m (597 ft)
- Highest elevation: 203 m (666 ft)
- Lowest elevation: 117 m (384 ft)
- Population (2023): 827
  - Density: 196/km^{2} (508/sq mi)
- Time zone: UTC+01:00 (CET)
  - Summer (DST): UTC+02:00 (CEST)
- INSEE/Postal code: 60334 /60730
- ^{1} French Land Register data, which excludes lakes, ponds, glaciers > 1 km^{2} (0.386 sq mi or 247 acres) and river estuaries.

Lachapelle-Saint-Pierre (French pronunciation: [laʃapɛl sɛ̃ pjɛʁ]) is a commune in the Oise department in northern France.

== See also ==
- Communes of the Oise department
