= Énencourt-Léage =

- Commune
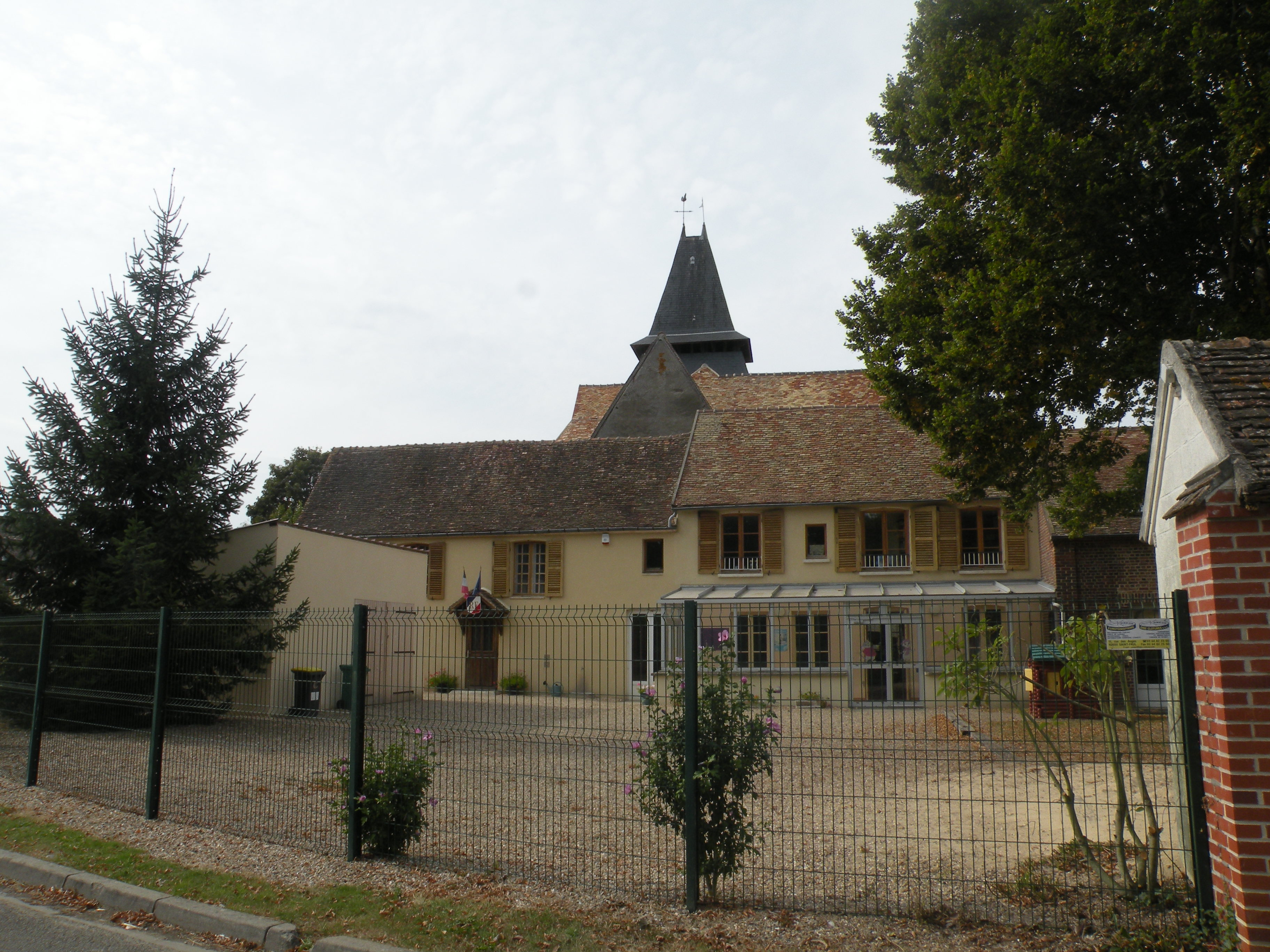
- Town hall
- Location of Énencourt-Léage
- Location within France Location within Hauts-de-France
- Coordinates: 49°18′17″N 1°50′51″E
- Country: France
- Region: Hauts-de-France
- Department: Oise
- Arrondissement: Beauvais
- Canton: Chaumont-en-Vexin
- Intercommunality: Vexin Thelle

Government
  - Mayor (2022–2026): Patricia Cot
- Area^{1}: 4.46 km^{2} (1.72 sq mi)
- Elevation: 62 m (203 ft)
- Highest elevation: 142 m (466 ft)
- Lowest elevation: 67 m (220 ft)
- Population (2023): 121
  - Density: 27.1/km^{2} (70.3/sq mi)
- Time zone: UTC+01:00 (CET)
  - Summer (DST): UTC+02:00 (CEST)
- INSEE/Postal code: 60208 /60590
- ^{1} French Land Register data, which excludes lakes, ponds, glaciers > 1 km^{2} (0.386 sq mi or 247 acres) and river estuaries.

Énencourt-Léage (French pronunciation: [enɑ̃kuʁ leaʒ]) is a commune in the Oise department in northern France.

== See also ==
- Communes of the Oise department
