= Chavençon =

- Commune
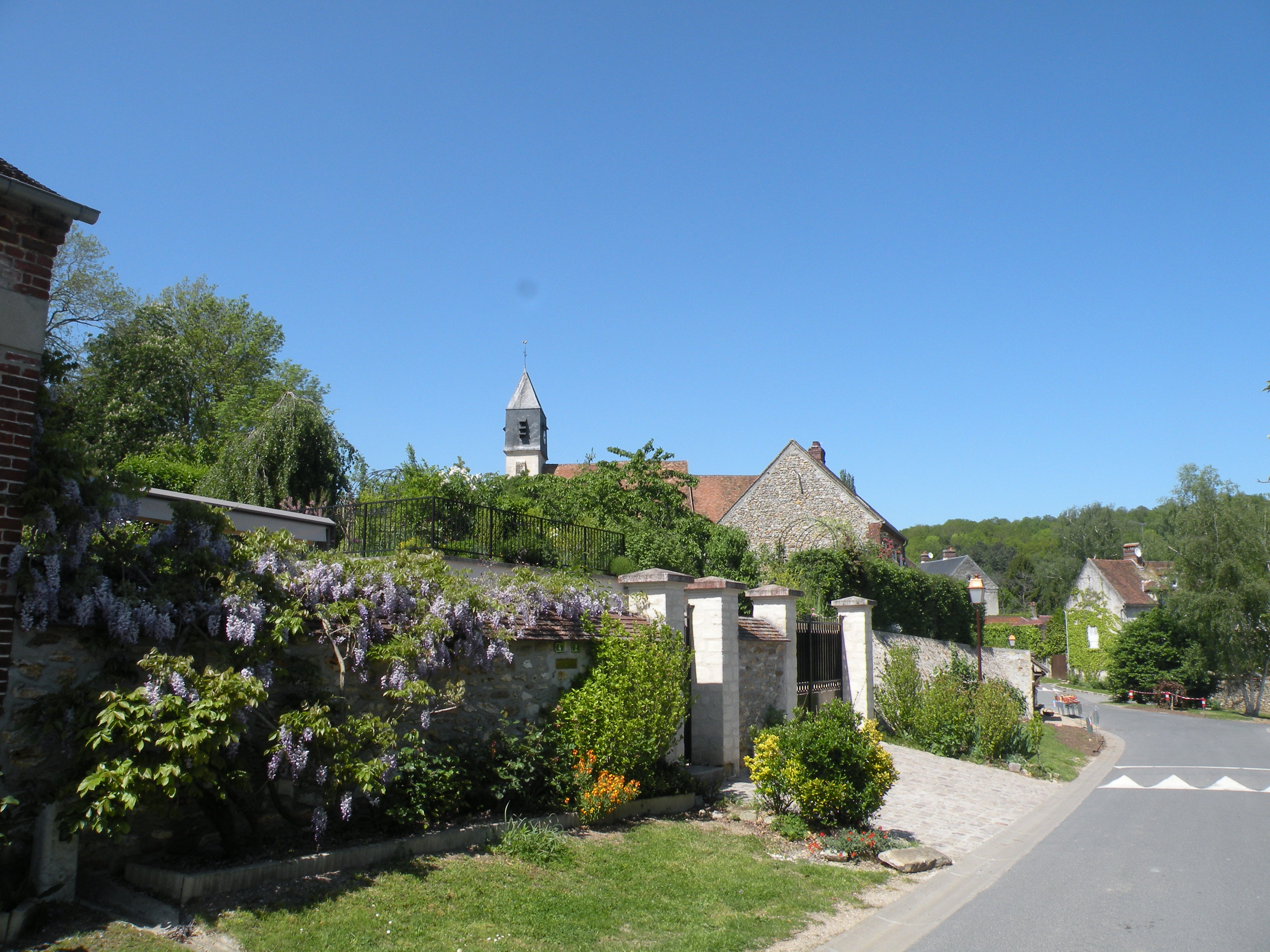
- A road within Chavençon
- Location of Chavençon
- Location within France Location within Hauts-de-France
- Coordinates: 49°11′18″N 1°59′44″E
- Country: France
- Region: Hauts-de-France
- Department: Oise
- Arrondissement: Beauvais
- Canton: Chaumont-en-Vexin
- Intercommunality: Sablons

Government
  - Mayor (2021–2026): Mireille Lutz
- Area^{1}: 5.76 km^{2} (2.22 sq mi)
- Elevation: 185 m (607 ft)
- Highest elevation: 213 m (699 ft)
- Lowest elevation: 90 m (300 ft)
- Population (2023): 159
  - Density: 27.6/km^{2} (71.5/sq mi)
- Time zone: UTC+01:00 (CET)
  - Summer (DST): UTC+02:00 (CEST)
- INSEE/Postal code: 60144 /60240
- ^{1} French Land Register data, which excludes lakes, ponds, glaciers > 1 km^{2} (0.386 sq mi or 247 acres) and river estuaries.

Chavençon (French pronunciation: [ʃavɑ̃sɔ̃]) is a commune in the Oise department in northern France.

== See also ==
- Communes of the Oise department
