= Ponchon =

- Commune
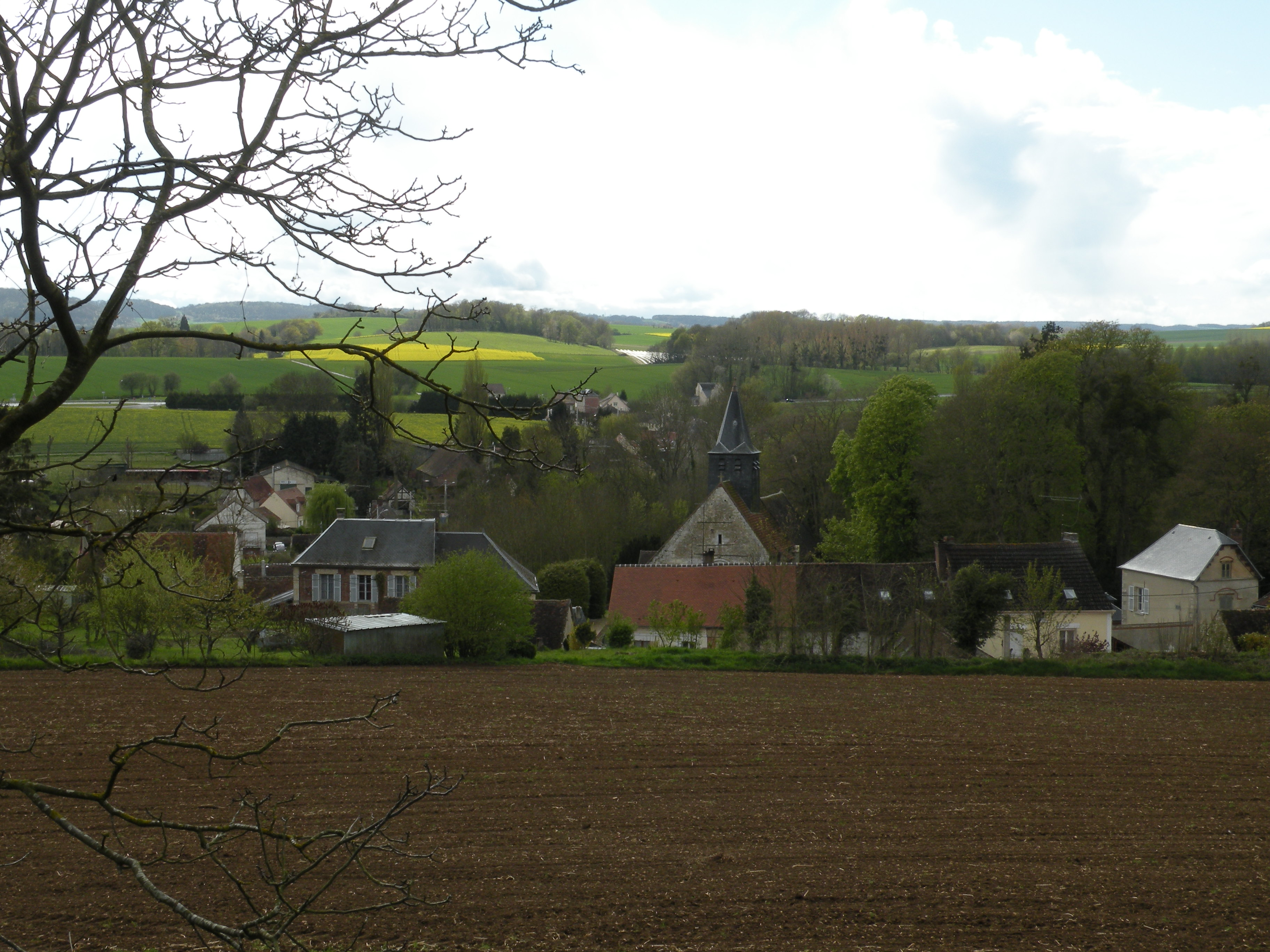
- A general view of Ponchon
- Location of Ponchon
- Location within France Location within Hauts-de-France
- Coordinates: 49°20′51″N 2°11′45″E
- Country: France
- Region: Hauts-de-France
- Department: Oise
- Arrondissement: Beauvais
- Canton: Chaumont-en-Vexin

Government
  - Mayor (2020–2026): Robert Joyot
- Area^{1}: 9.73 km^{2} (3.76 sq mi)
- Elevation: 115 m (377 ft)
- Highest elevation: 147 m (482 ft)
- Lowest elevation: 61 m (200 ft)
- Population (2023): 1,163
  - Density: 120/km^{2} (310/sq mi)
- Time zone: UTC+01:00 (CET)
  - Summer (DST): UTC+02:00 (CEST)
- INSEE/Postal code: 60504 /60430
- ^{1} French Land Register data, which excludes lakes, ponds, glaciers > 1 km^{2} (0.386 sq mi or 247 acres) and river estuaries.

Ponchon (French pronunciation: [pɔ̃ʃɔ̃]) is a commune in the Oise department in northern France.

== See also ==
- Communes of the Oise department
