= Berthecourt =

- Commune
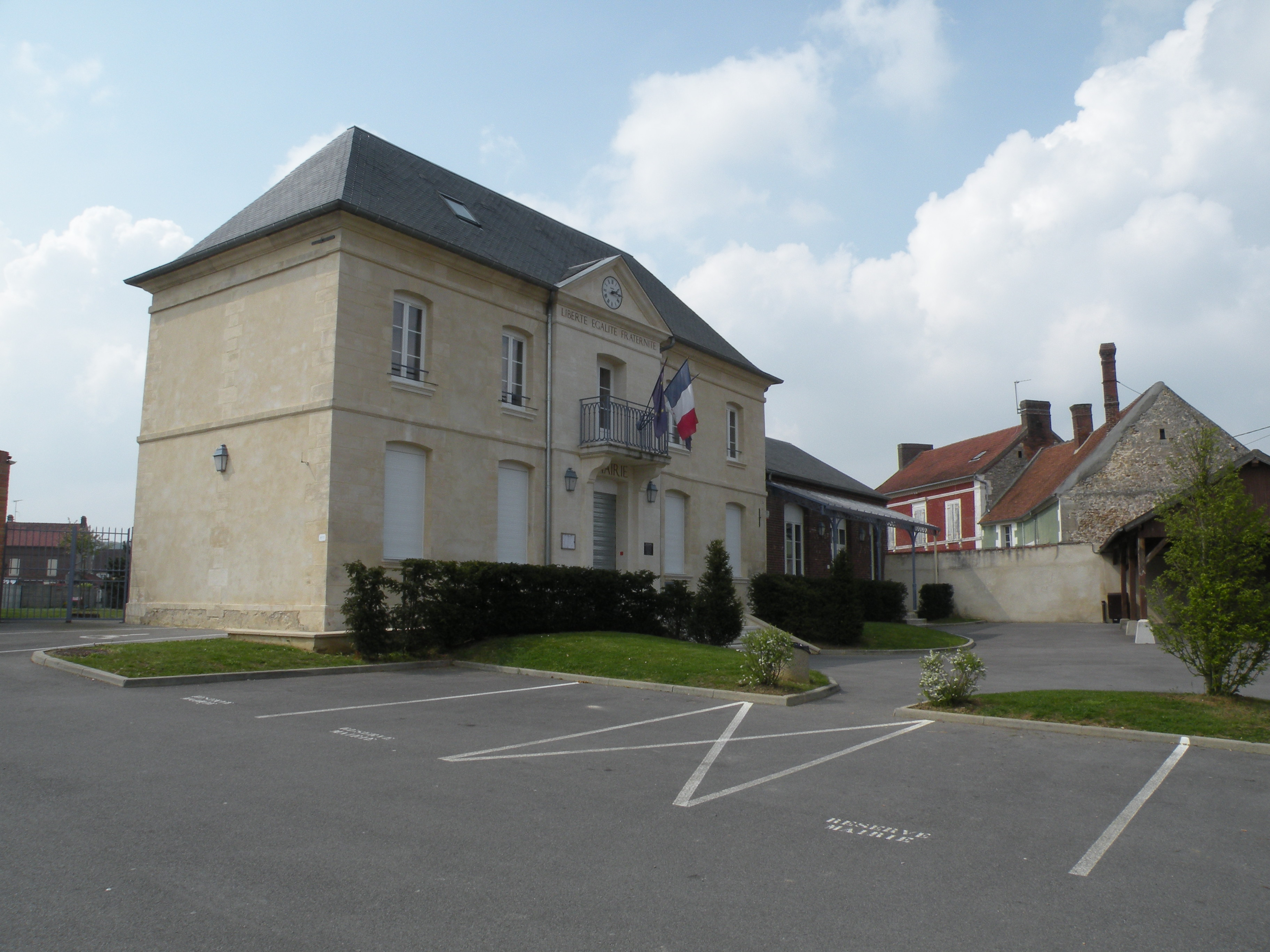
- The town hall in Berthecourt
- Location of Berthecourt
- Location within France Location within Hauts-de-France
- Coordinates: 49°21′04″N 2°13′32″E
- Country: France
- Region: Hauts-de-France
- Department: Oise
- Arrondissement: Beauvais
- Canton: Chaumont-en-Vexin

Government
  - Mayor (2020–2026): Lydia Borderes
- Area^{1}: 6.97 km^{2} (2.69 sq mi)
- Elevation: 43 m (141 ft)
- Highest elevation: 128 m (420 ft)
- Lowest elevation: 45 m (148 ft)
- Population (2023): 1,564
  - Density: 224/km^{2} (581/sq mi)
- Time zone: UTC+01:00 (CET)
  - Summer (DST): UTC+02:00 (CEST)
- INSEE/Postal code: 60065 /60370
- ^{1} French Land Register data, which excludes lakes, ponds, glaciers > 1 km^{2} (0.386 sq mi or 247 acres) and river estuaries.

Berthecourt (French pronunciation: [bɛʁtəkuʁ]) is a commune in the Oise department in northern France.

== Population ==
Historical population
Year	Pop.	±% p.a.
1968	947	—
1975	986	+0.58%
1982	981	−0.07%
1990	1,153	+2.04%
1999	1,355	+1.81%
2007	1,551	+1.70%
2012	1,635	+1.06%
2017	1,633	−0.02%
2023	1,564	−0.72%
Source: INSEE

== See also ==
- Communes of the Oise department
