= Jaméricourt =

- Commune
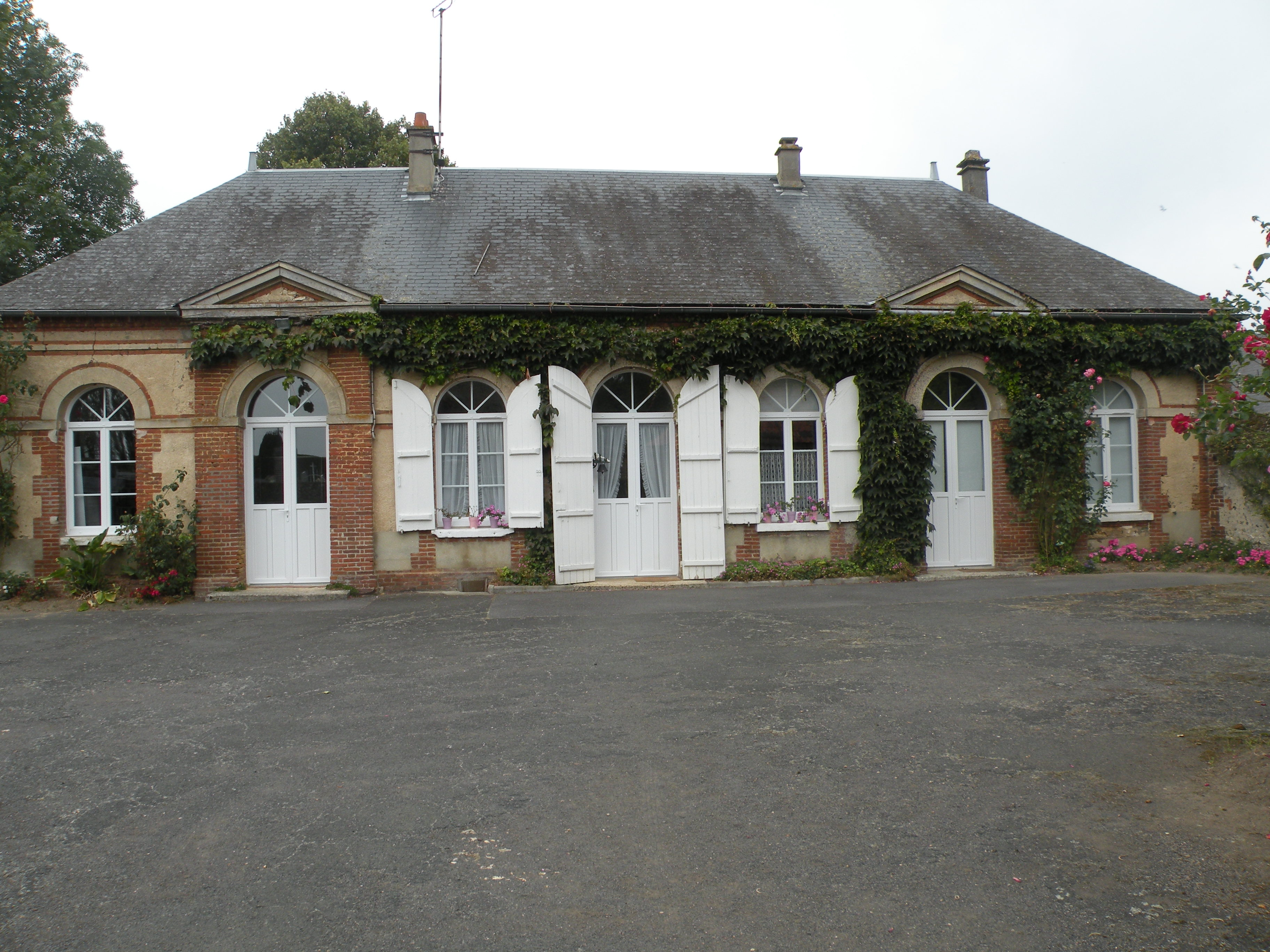
- The town hall in Jaméricourt
- Location of Jaméricourt
- Location within France Location within Hauts-de-France
- Coordinates: 49°18′16″N 1°52′50″E
- Country: France
- Region: Hauts-de-France
- Department: Oise
- Arrondissement: Beauvais
- Canton: Chaumont-en-Vexin
- Intercommunality: Vexin Thelle

Government
  - Mayor (2020–2026): Bertrand Gernez
- Area^{1}: 4.25 km^{2} (1.64 sq mi)
- Elevation: 105 m (344 ft)
- Highest elevation: 130 m (430 ft)
- Lowest elevation: 79 m (259 ft)
- Population (2023): 302
  - Density: 71.1/km^{2} (184/sq mi)
- Time zone: UTC+01:00 (CET)
  - Summer (DST): UTC+02:00 (CEST)
- INSEE/Postal code: 60322 /60240
- ^{1} French Land Register data, which excludes lakes, ponds, glaciers > 1 km^{2} (0.386 sq mi or 247 acres) and river estuaries.

Jaméricourt (French pronunciation: [ʒameʁikuʁ]) is a commune in the Oise department in northern France.

== See also ==
- Communes of the Oise department
