= Fresne-Léguillon =

- Commune
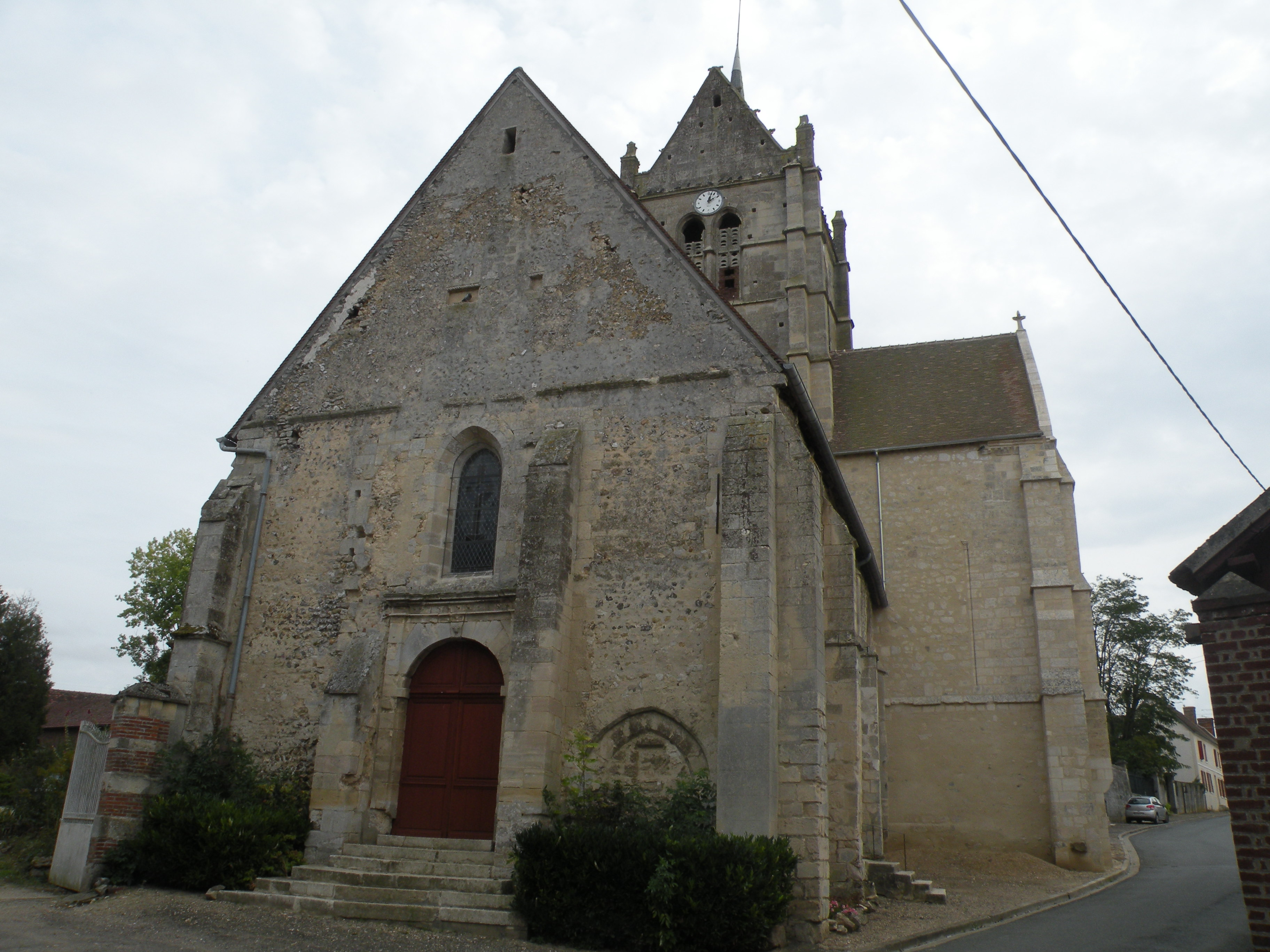
- The church in Fresne-Léguillon

- Coat of arms
- Location of Fresne-Léguillon
- Location within France Location within Hauts-de-France
- Coordinates: 49°15′18″N 1°59′05″E
- Country: France
- Region: Hauts-de-France
- Department: Oise
- Arrondissement: Beauvais
- Canton: Chaumont-en-Vexin
- Intercommunality: Vexin Thelle

Government
  - Mayor (2023–2026): Aude Ribeiro De Sousa
- Area^{1}: 7.31 km^{2} (2.82 sq mi)
- Elevation: 95 m (312 ft)
- Highest elevation: 132 m (433 ft)
- Lowest elevation: 74 m (243 ft)
- Population (2023): 440
  - Density: 60/km^{2} (160/sq mi)
- Time zone: UTC+01:00 (CET)
  - Summer (DST): UTC+02:00 (CEST)
- INSEE/Postal code: 60257 /60240
- ^{1} French Land Register data, which excludes lakes, ponds, glaciers > 1 km^{2} (0.386 sq mi or 247 acres) and river estuaries.

Fresne-Léguillon (French pronunciation: [fʁɛn leɡɥijɔ̃]) is a commune in the Oise department in northern France.

== See also ==
- Communes of the Oise department
