= Lierville =

- Commune
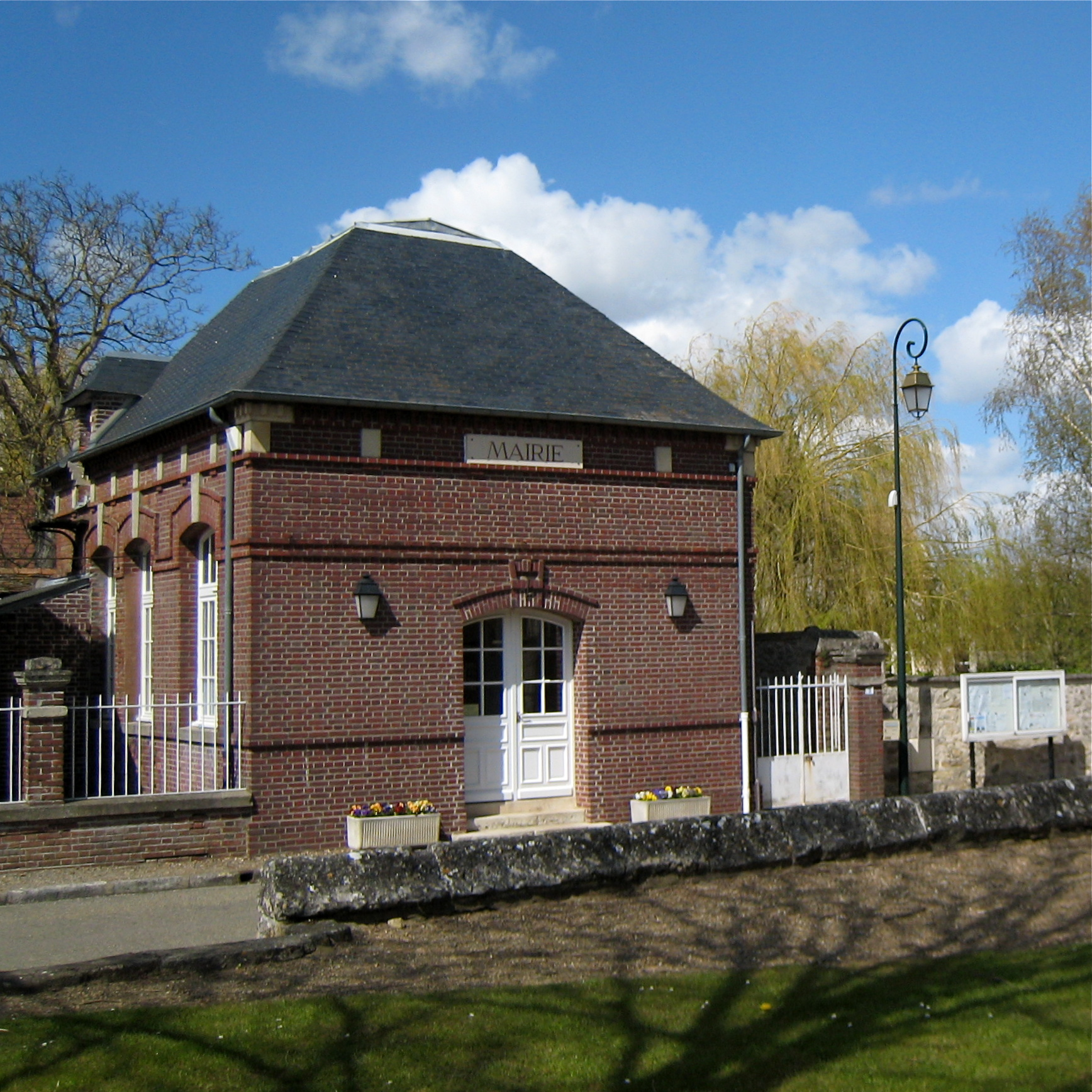
- The town hall in Lierville
- Location of Lierville
- Location within France Location within Hauts-de-France
- Coordinates: 49°11′28″N 1°52′57″E
- Country: France
- Region: Hauts-de-France
- Department: Oise
- Arrondissement: Beauvais
- Canton: Chaumont-en-Vexin
- Intercommunality: Vexin Thelle

Government
  - Mayor (2020–2026): Patrick Montillon
- Area^{1}: 7.75 km^{2} (2.99 sq mi)
- Elevation: 120 m (390 ft)
- Highest elevation: 132 m (433 ft)
- Lowest elevation: 76 m (249 ft)
- Population (2023): 224
  - Density: 28.9/km^{2} (74.9/sq mi)
- Time zone: UTC+01:00 (CET)
  - Summer (DST): UTC+02:00 (CEST)
- INSEE/Postal code: 60363 /60240
- ^{1} French Land Register data, which excludes lakes, ponds, glaciers > 1 km^{2} (0.386 sq mi or 247 acres) and river estuaries.

Lierville is a commune in the Oise department in northern France.

== See also ==
- Communes of the Oise department
