= Delincourt =

- Commune
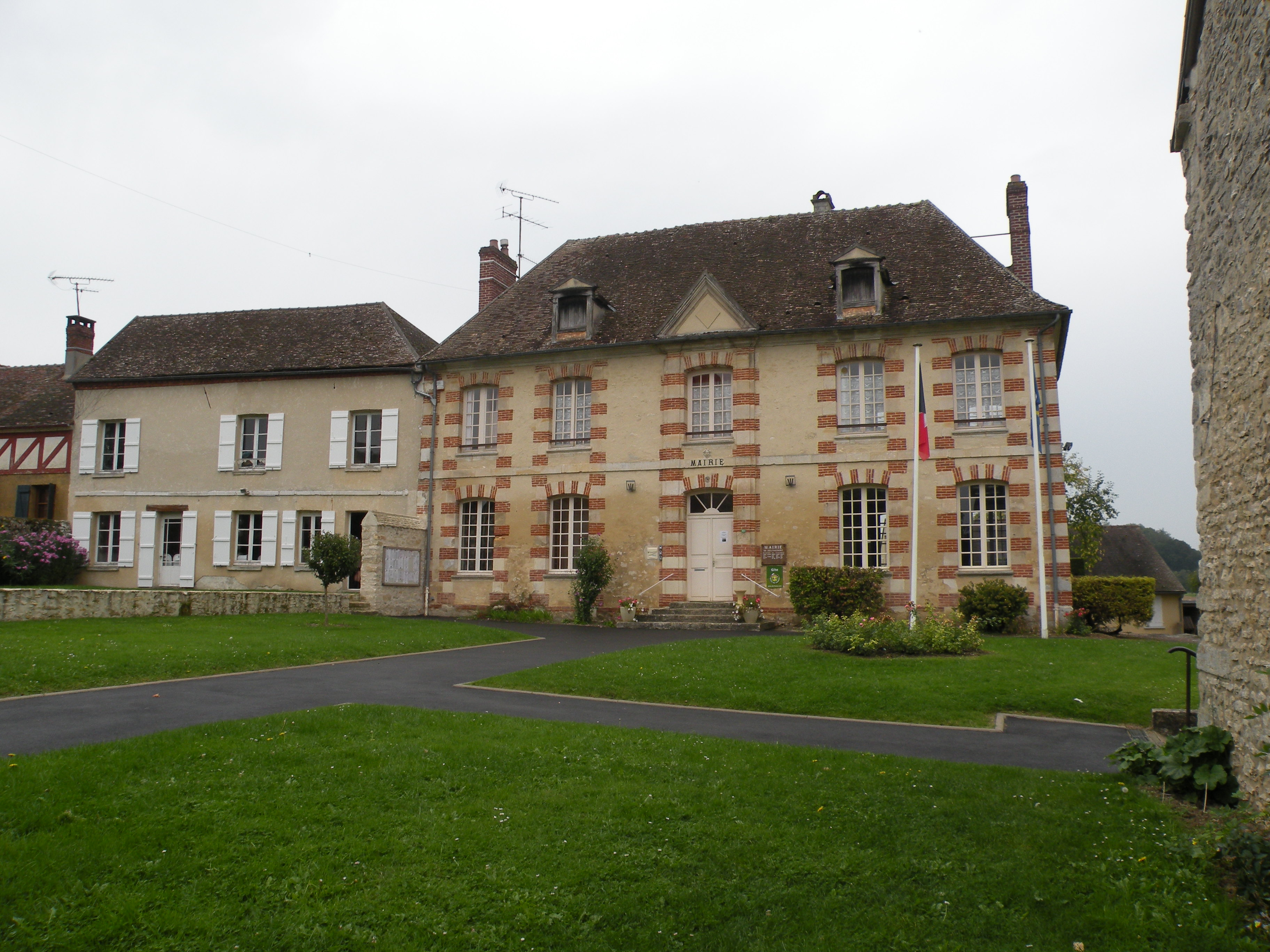
- The town hall in Delincourt
- Location of Delincourt
- Location within France Location within Hauts-de-France
- Coordinates: 49°14′38″N 1°49′58″E
- Country: France
- Region: Hauts-de-France
- Department: Oise
- Arrondissement: Beauvais
- Canton: Chaumont-en-Vexin
- Intercommunality: Vexin Thelle

Government
  - Mayor (2020–2026): Edith Martin
- Area^{1}: 8.05 km^{2} (3.11 sq mi)
- Elevation: 120 m (390 ft)
- Highest elevation: 144 m (472 ft)
- Lowest elevation: 65 m (213 ft)
- Population (2023): 537
  - Density: 66.7/km^{2} (173/sq mi)
- Time zone: UTC+01:00 (CET)
  - Summer (DST): UTC+02:00 (CEST)
- INSEE/Postal code: 60195 /60240
- ^{1} French Land Register data, which excludes lakes, ponds, glaciers > 1 km^{2} (0.386 sq mi or 247 acres) and river estuaries.

Delincourt (French pronunciation: [dəlɛ̃kuʁ]) is a commune in the Oise department in northern France.

== See also ==
- Communes of the Oise department
