= Hénonville =

- Commune
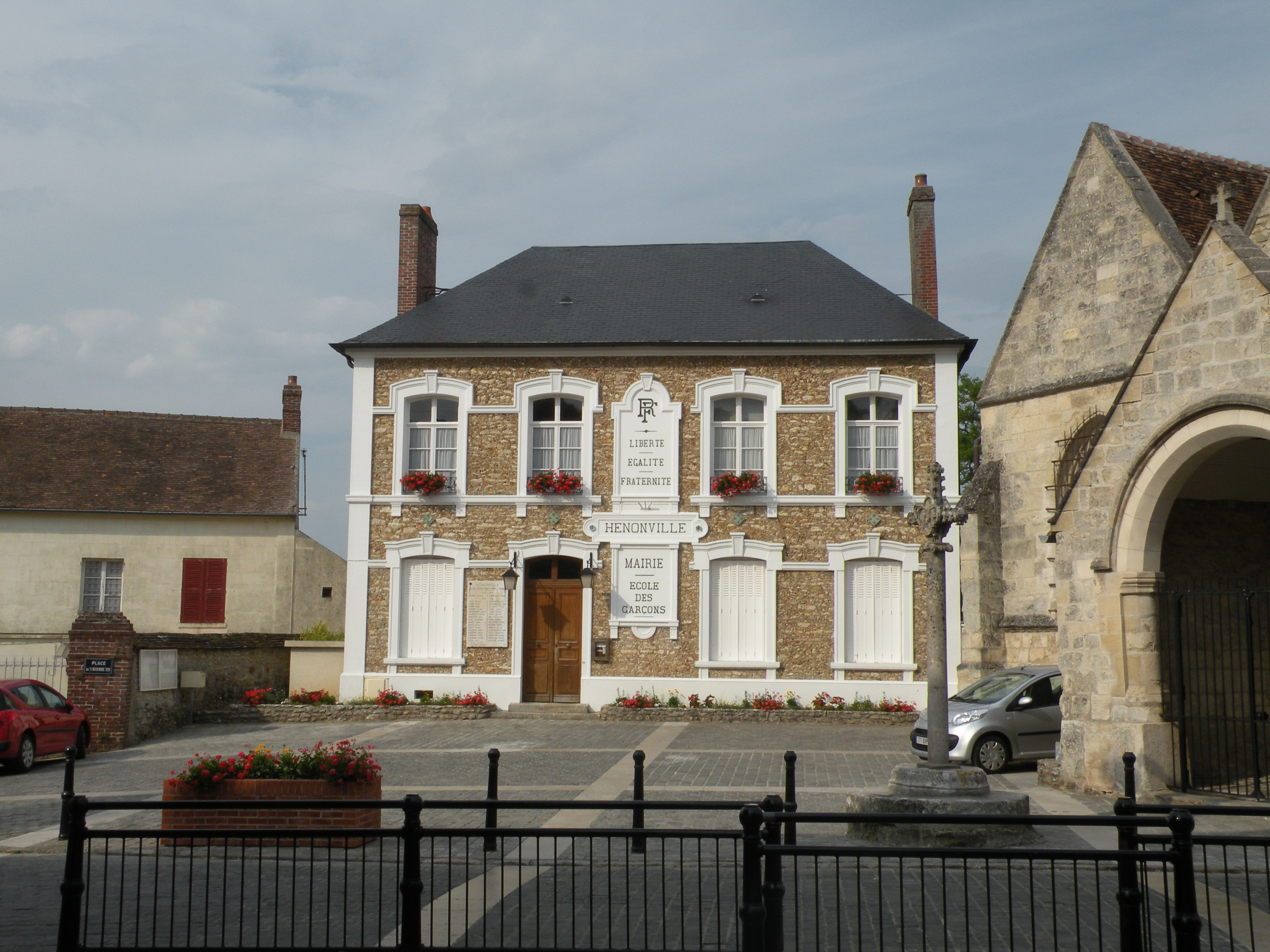
- Town hall
- Location of Hénonville
- Location within France Location within Hauts-de-France
- Coordinates: 49°12′28″N 2°03′14″E
- Country: France
- Region: Hauts-de-France
- Department: Oise
- Arrondissement: Beauvais
- Canton: Chaumont-en-Vexin
- Intercommunality: Sablons

Government
  - Mayor (2020–2026): Hervé Le Marec
- Area^{1}: 6.84 km^{2} (2.64 sq mi)
- Elevation: 96 m (315 ft)
- Highest elevation: 151 m (495 ft)
- Lowest elevation: 80 m (260 ft)
- Population (2023): 925
  - Density: 135/km^{2} (350/sq mi)
- Time zone: UTC+01:00 (CET)
  - Summer (DST): UTC+02:00 (CEST)
- INSEE/Postal code: 60309 /60119
- ^{1} French Land Register data, which excludes lakes, ponds, glaciers > 1 km^{2} (0.386 sq mi or 247 acres) and river estuaries.

Hénonville (French pronunciation: [enɔ̃vil]) is a commune in the Oise department in northern France.

== See also ==
- Communes of the Oise department
