= Bouconvillers =

- Commune
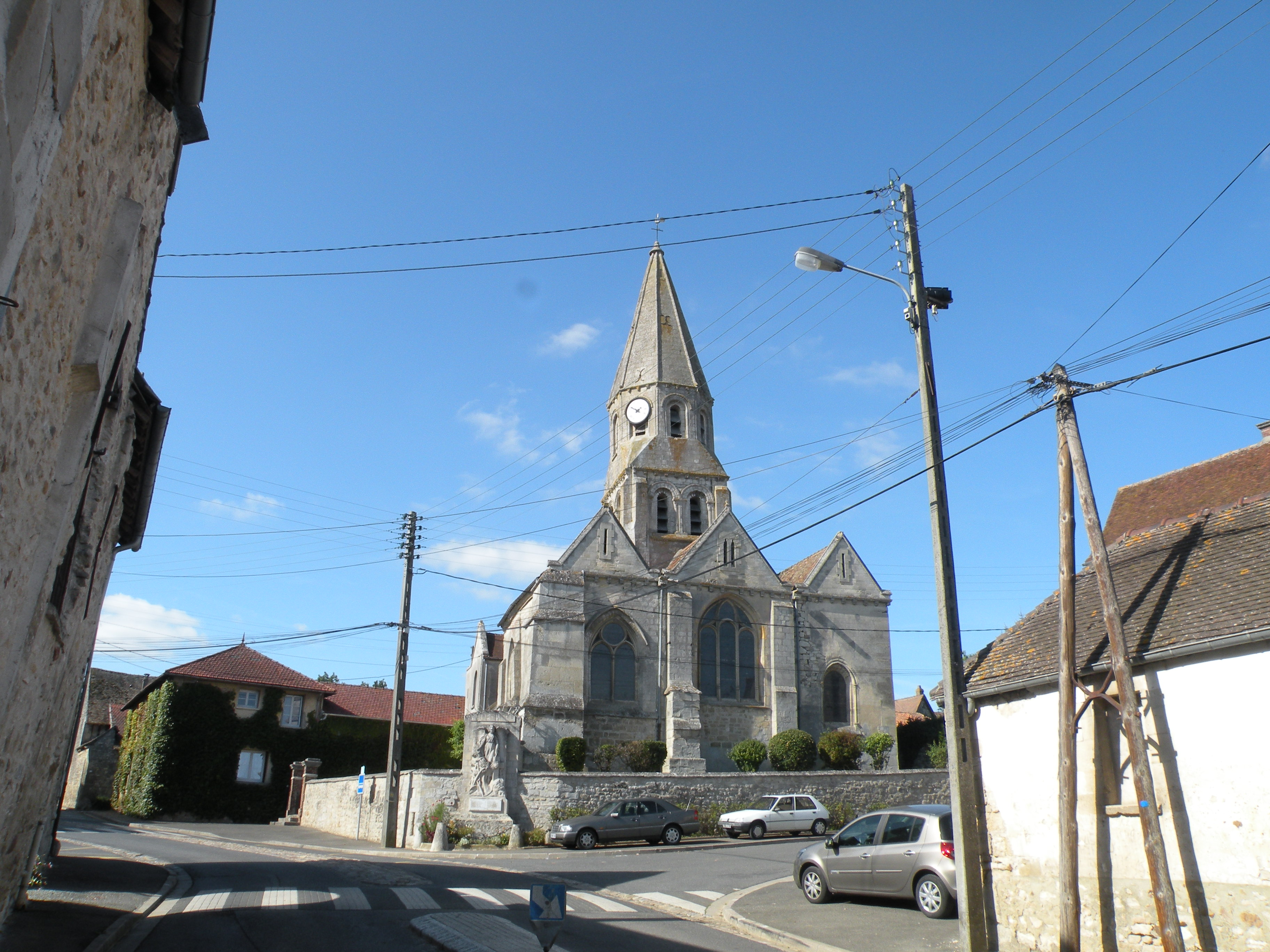
- The church in Bouconvillers

- Coat of arms
- Location of Bouconvillers
- Location within France Location within Hauts-de-France
- Coordinates: 49°10′36″N 1°54′16″E
- Country: France
- Region: Hauts-de-France
- Department: Oise
- Arrondissement: Beauvais
- Canton: Chaumont-en-Vexin
- Intercommunality: Vexin Thelle

Government
  - Mayor (2020–2026): Philippe Morin
- Area^{1}: 4.79 km^{2} (1.85 sq mi)
- Elevation: 98 m (322 ft)
- Highest elevation: 121 m (397 ft)
- Lowest elevation: 62 m (203 ft)
- Population (2023): 423
  - Density: 88.3/km^{2} (229/sq mi)
- Time zone: UTC+01:00 (CET)
  - Summer (DST): UTC+02:00 (CEST)
- INSEE/Postal code: 60090 /60240
- ^{1} French Land Register data, which excludes lakes, ponds, glaciers > 1 km^{2} (0.386 sq mi or 247 acres) and river estuaries.

Bouconvillers is a commune in the Oise department in northern France.

== Population ==
Historical population
Year	Pop.	±% p.a.
1968	180	—
1975	167	−1.07%
1982	323	+9.88%
1990	350	+1.01%
1999	362	+0.38%
2007	372	+0.34%
2012	371	−0.05%
2017	387	+0.85%
2023	423	+1.49%
Source: INSEE

== See also ==
- Communes of the Oise department
