= Le Coudray-sur-Thelle =

- Commune
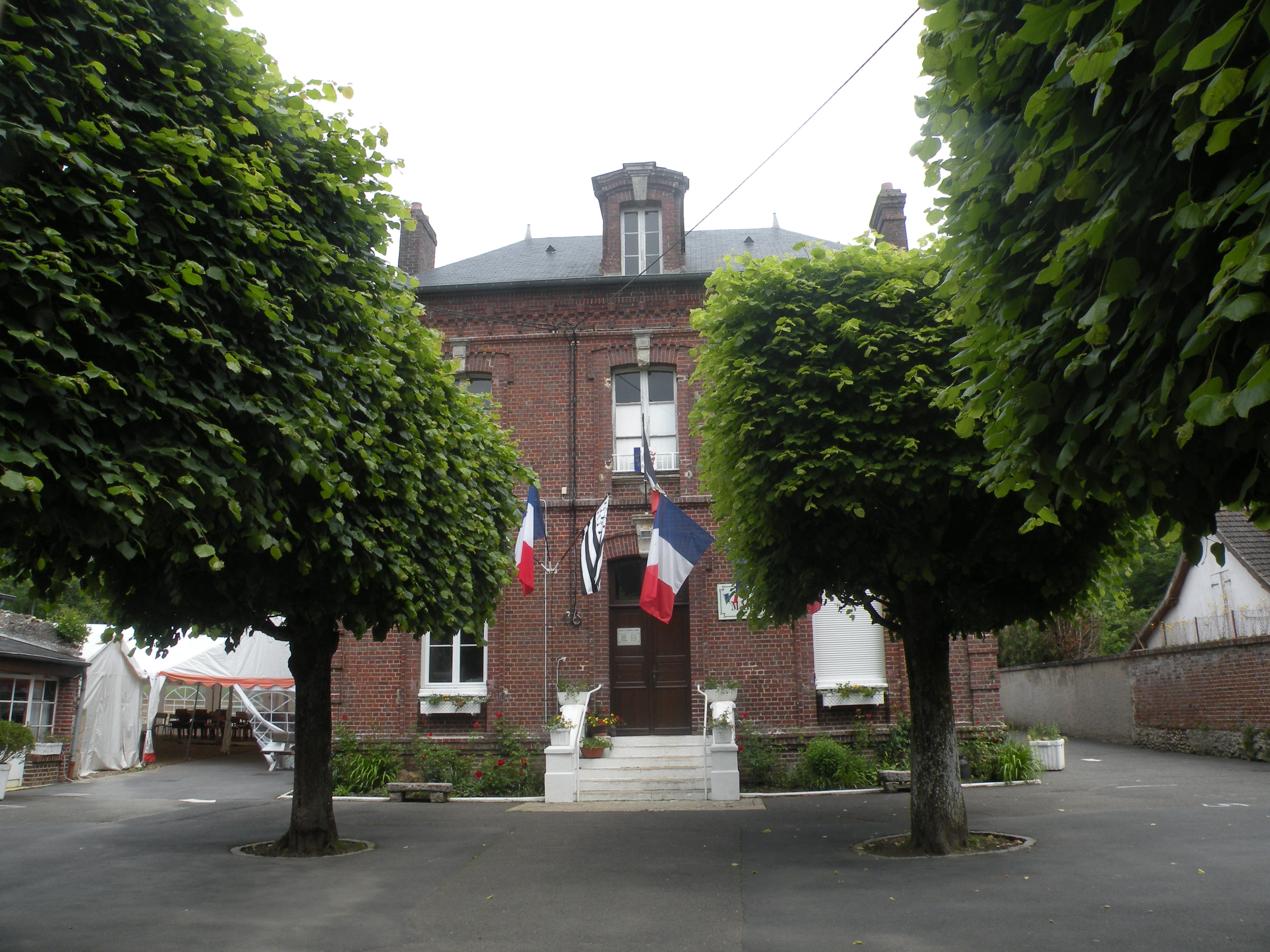
- The town hall in Le Coudray-sur-Thelle
- Location of Le Coudray-sur-Thelle
- Location within France Location within Hauts-de-France
- Coordinates: 49°18′24″N 2°07′29″E
- Country: France
- Region: Hauts-de-France
- Department: Oise
- Arrondissement: Beauvais
- Canton: Chaumont-en-Vexin

Government
  - Mayor (2020–2026): Ludovic Gorine
- Area^{1}: 3.76 km^{2} (1.45 sq mi)
- Elevation: 233 m (764 ft)
- Highest elevation: 229 m (751 ft)
- Lowest elevation: 165 m (541 ft)
- Population (2023): 554
  - Density: 147/km^{2} (382/sq mi)
- Time zone: UTC+01:00 (CET)
  - Summer (DST): UTC+02:00 (CEST)
- INSEE/Postal code: 60165 /60430
- ^{1} French Land Register data, which excludes lakes, ponds, glaciers > 1 km^{2} (0.386 sq mi or 247 acres) and river estuaries.

Le Coudray-sur-Thelle (French pronunciation: [lə kudʁɛ syʁ tɛl]) is a commune in the Oise department in northern France.

== See also ==
- Communes of the Oise department
