= Fay-les-Étangs =

- Commune
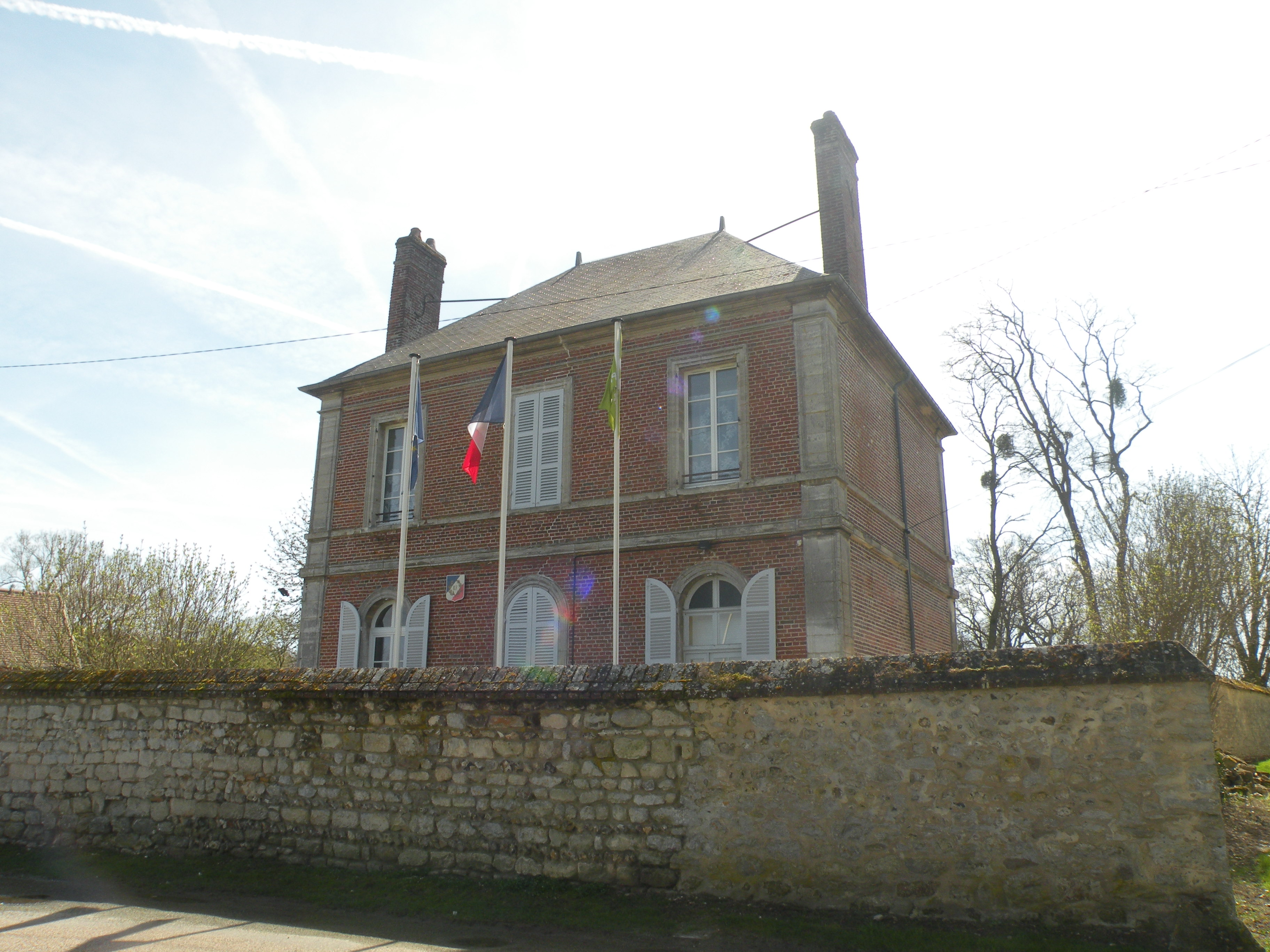
- The town hall in Fay-les-Étangs
- Location of Fay-les-Étangs
- Location within France Location within Hauts-de-France
- Coordinates: 49°14′49″N 1°56′26″E
- Country: France
- Region: Hauts-de-France
- Department: Oise
- Arrondissement: Beauvais
- Canton: Chaumont-en-Vexin
- Intercommunality: Vexin Thelle

Government
  - Mayor (2020–2026): Alain Ridel
- Area^{1}: 8.47 km^{2} (3.27 sq mi)
- Elevation: 68 m (223 ft)
- Highest elevation: 114 m (374 ft)
- Lowest elevation: 66 m (217 ft)
- Population (2023): 473
  - Density: 55.8/km^{2} (145/sq mi)
- Time zone: UTC+01:00 (CET)
  - Summer (DST): UTC+02:00 (CEST)
- INSEE/Postal code: 60228 /60240
- ^{1} French Land Register data, which excludes lakes, ponds, glaciers > 1 km^{2} (0.386 sq mi or 247 acres) and river estuaries.

Fay-les-Étangs (French pronunciation: [fɛ le.z‿etɑ̃]) is a commune in the Oise department in northern France.

== See also ==
- Communes of the Oise department
