= Canton of Chaumont-en-Vexin =

Coordinates: 49.26°N 1.88°E

- Canton
- Situation of the canton of Chaumont-en-Vexin in the department of Oise
- Country: France
- Region: Hauts-de-France
- Department: Oise
- No. of communes: {{{nbcomm}}}

Government
  - Representatives (2021–2028): Benoît Biberon and Sophie Levesque (DVD)
- Area: 552.65 km^{2} (213.38 sq mi)
- Population (2023): 46,928
  - Density: 84.915/km^{2} (219.93/sq mi)
- INSEE code: 6004

The canton of Chaumont-en-Vexin is an administrative division of the Oise department, northern France. Its borders were modified at the French canton reorganisation which came into effect in March 2015. Its seat is in Chaumont-en-Vexin.

It consists of the following communes:

1. Abbecourt
2. Beaumont-les-Nonains
3. Berthecourt
4. Boubiers
5. Bouconvillers
6. Boury-en-Vexin
7. Boutencourt
8. Cauvigny
9. Chambors
10. Chaumont-en-Vexin
11. Chavençon
12. Corbeil-Cerf
13. La Corne-en-Vexin
14. Le Coudray-sur-Thelle
15. Courcelles-lès-Gisors
16. Delincourt
17. La Drenne
18. Énencourt-Léage
19. Éragny-sur-Epte
20. Fay-les-Étangs
21. Fleury
22. Fresne-Léguillon
23. Hadancourt-le-Haut-Clocher
24. Les Hauts-Talican
25. Hénonville
26. Hodenc-l'Évêque
27. Ivry-le-Temple
28. Jaméricourt
29. Jouy-sous-Thelle
30. Laboissière-en-Thelle
31. Lachapelle-Saint-Pierre
32. Lattainville
33. Lavilletertre
34. Liancourt-Saint-Pierre
35. Lierville
36. Loconville
37. Le Mesnil-Théribus
38. Monneville
39. Montagny-en-Vexin
40. Montchevreuil
41. Montjavoult
42. Montreuil-sur-Thérain
43. Monts
44. Mortefontaine-en-Thelle
45. Mouchy-le-Châtel
46. Neuville-Bosc
47. Noailles
48. Novillers
49. Parnes
50. Ponchon
51. Pouilly
52. Reilly
53. Saint-Crépin-Ibouvillers
54. Saint-Sulpice
55. Sainte-Geneviève
56. Senots
57. Serans
58. Silly-Tillard
59. Thibivillers
60. Tourly
61. Trie-Château
62. Trie-la-Ville
63. Valdampierre
64. Vaudancourt
65. Villers-Saint-Sépulcre
