= Jouy-sous-Thelle =

- Commune
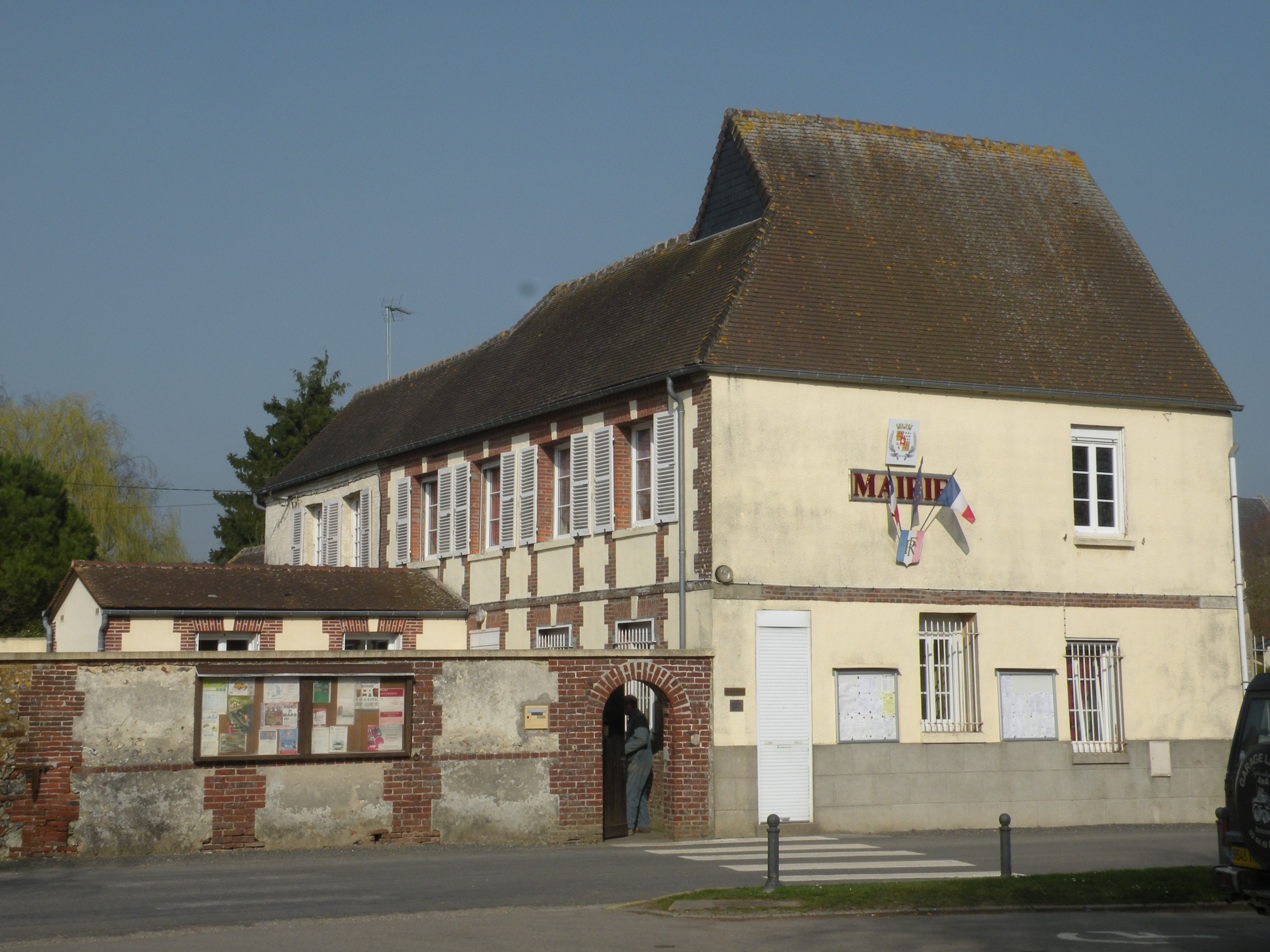
- The town hall in Jouy-sous-Thelle

- Coat of arms
- Location of Jouy-sous-Thelle
- Location within France Location within Hauts-de-France
- Coordinates: 49°19′05″N 1°58′14″E
- Country: France
- Region: Hauts-de-France
- Department: Oise
- Arrondissement: Beauvais
- Canton: Chaumont-en-Vexin

Government
  - Mayor (2020–2026): Hervé Lefevre
- Area^{1}: 12.78 km^{2} (4.93 sq mi)
- Elevation: 178 m (584 ft)
- Highest elevation: 219 m (719 ft)
- Lowest elevation: 128 m (420 ft)
- Population (2023): 1,071
  - Density: 83.80/km^{2} (217.0/sq mi)
- Time zone: UTC+01:00 (CET)
  - Summer (DST): UTC+02:00 (CEST)
- INSEE/Postal code: 60327 /60240
- ^{1} French Land Register data, which excludes lakes, ponds, glaciers > 1 km^{2} (0.386 sq mi or 247 acres) and river estuaries.

Jouy-sous-Thelle (French pronunciation: [ʒwi su tɛl]) is a commune in the Oise department in northern France.

== See also ==
- Communes of the Oise department
