= Lattainville =

- Commune
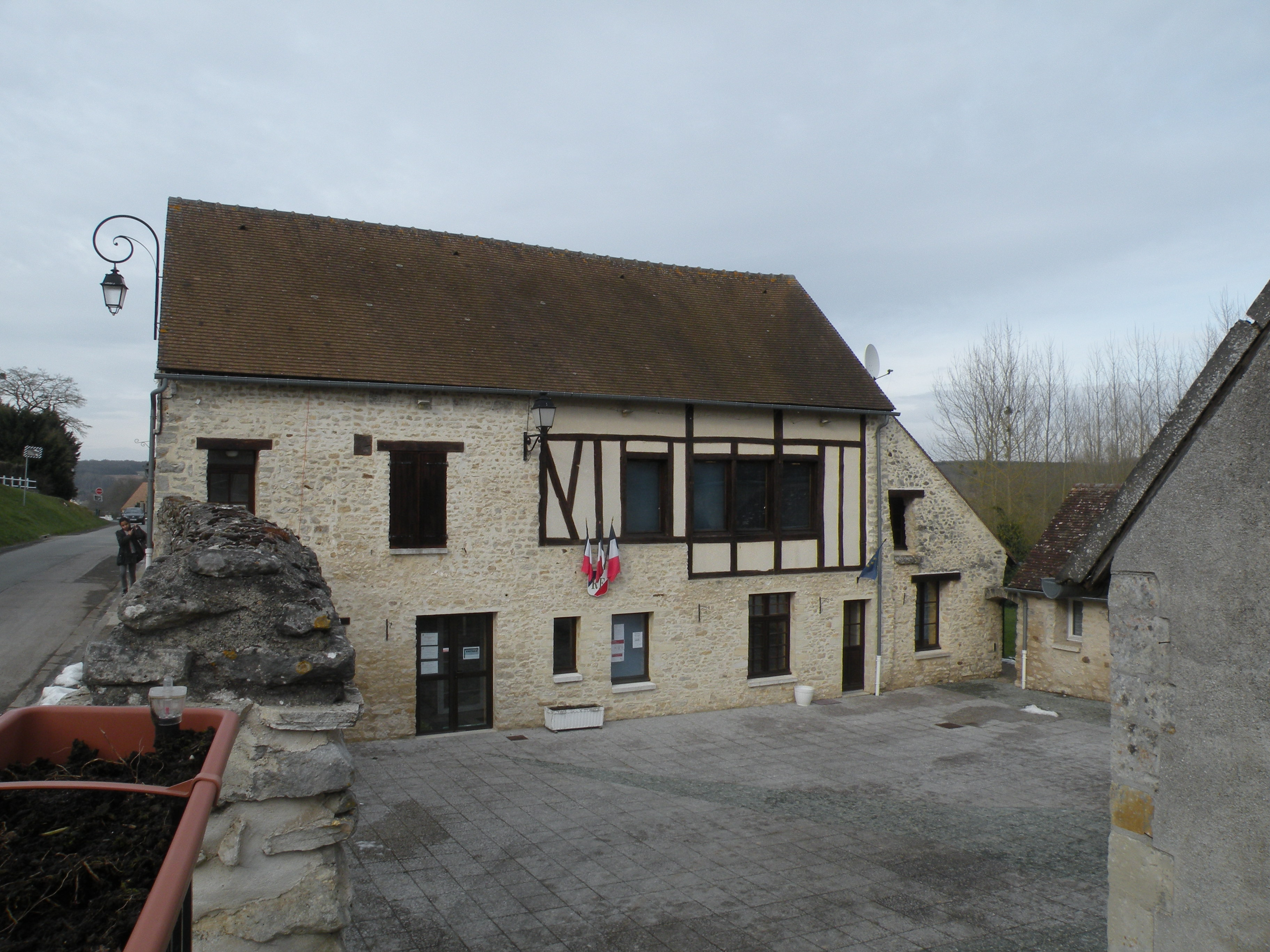
- The town hall in Lattainville
- Location of Lattainville
- Location within France Location within Hauts-de-France
- Coordinates: 49°14′33″N 1°48′55″E
- Country: France
- Region: Hauts-de-France
- Department: Oise
- Arrondissement: Beauvais
- Canton: Chaumont-en-Vexin
- Intercommunality: Vexin Thelle

Government
  - Mayor (2020–2026): Laurent Steiner
- Area^{1}: 3.44 km^{2} (1.33 sq mi)
- Elevation: 100 m (330 ft)
- Highest elevation: 142 m (466 ft)
- Lowest elevation: 66 m (217 ft)
- Population (2023): 180
  - Density: 52/km^{2} (140/sq mi)
- Time zone: UTC+01:00 (CET)
  - Summer (DST): UTC+02:00 (CEST)
- INSEE/Postal code: 60352 /60240
- ^{1} French Land Register data, which excludes lakes, ponds, glaciers > 1 km^{2} (0.386 sq mi or 247 acres) and river estuaries.

Lattainville (French pronunciation: [latɛ̃vil]) is a commune in the Oise department in northern France.

== See also ==
- Communes of the Oise department
