= Monneville =

- Commune
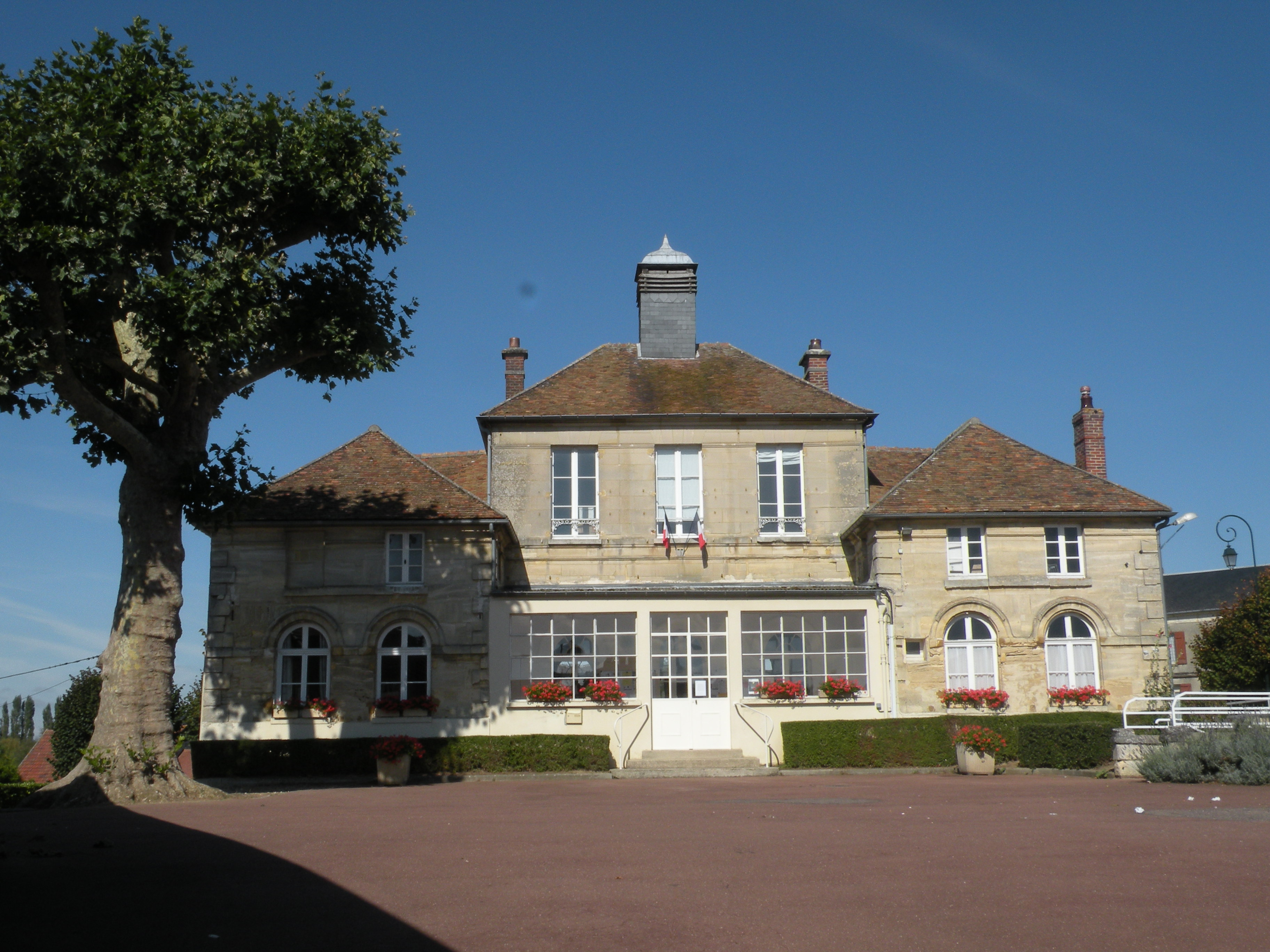
- The town hall in Monneville
- Location of Monneville
- Location within France Location within Hauts-de-France
- Coordinates: 49°12′31″N 1°58′30″E
- Country: France
- Region: Hauts-de-France
- Department: Oise
- Arrondissement: Beauvais
- Canton: Chaumont-en-Vexin
- Intercommunality: Vexin Thelle

Government
  - Mayor (2020–2026): William Blanchet
- Area^{1}: 9.19 km^{2} (3.55 sq mi)
- Elevation: 144 m (472 ft)
- Highest elevation: 154 m (505 ft)
- Lowest elevation: 69 m (226 ft)
- Population (2023): 765
  - Density: 83.2/km^{2} (216/sq mi)
- Time zone: UTC+01:00 (CET)
  - Summer (DST): UTC+02:00 (CEST)
- INSEE/Postal code: 60411 /60240
- ^{1} French Land Register data, which excludes lakes, ponds, glaciers > 1 km^{2} (0.386 sq mi or 247 acres) and river estuaries.

Monneville (French pronunciation: [mɔnvil]) is a commune in the Oise department in northern France.

== See also ==
- Communes of the Oise department
