= Monts, Oise =

Monts
- Commune
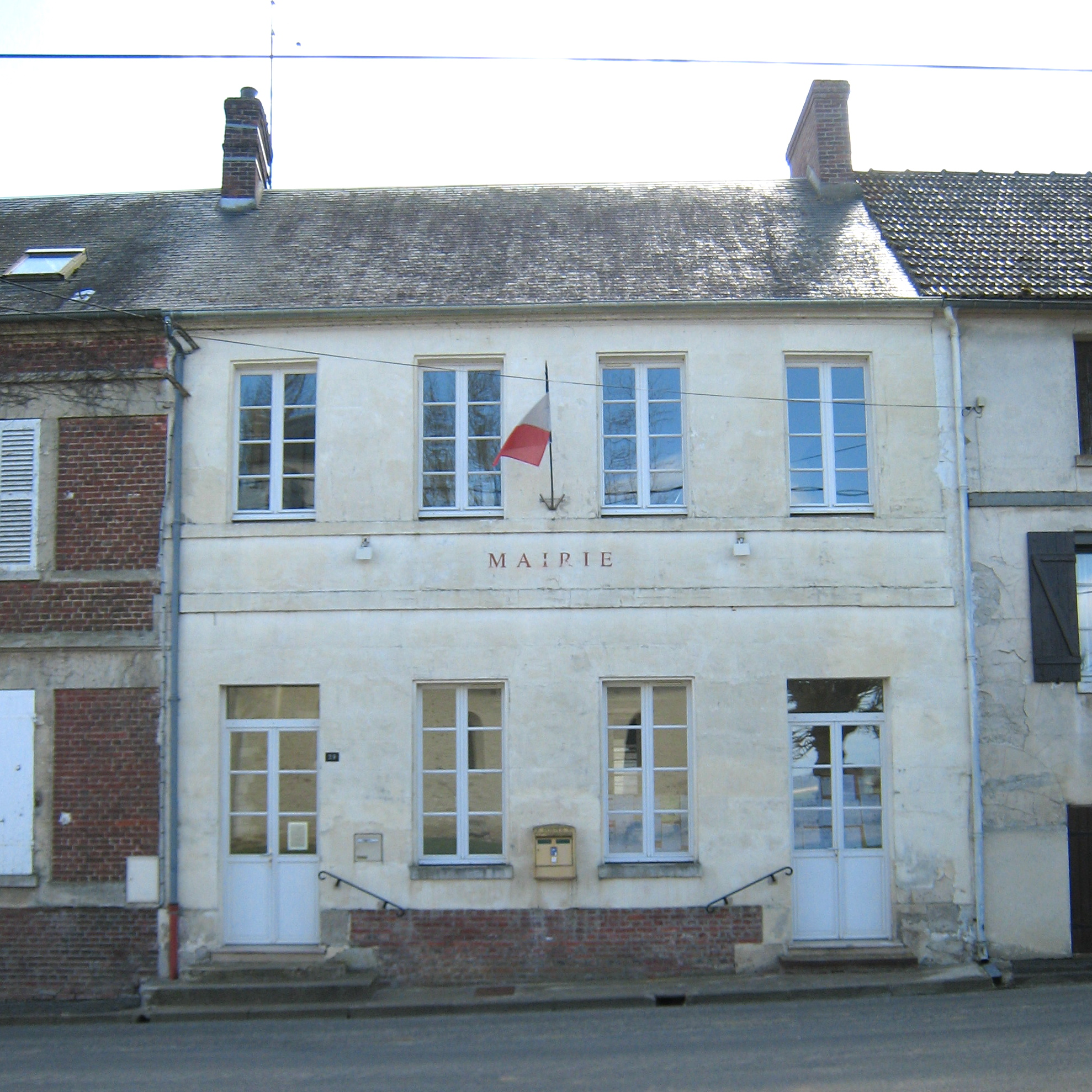
- The town hall in Monts
- Location of Monts
- Location within France Location within Hauts-de-France
- Coordinates: 49°13′01″N 2°01′39″E
- Country: France
- Region: Hauts-de-France
- Department: Oise
- Arrondissement: Beauvais
- Canton: Chaumont-en-Vexin
- Intercommunality: Sablons

Government
  - Mayor (2020–2026): Didier Bouilliant
- Area^{1}: 3.67 km^{2} (1.42 sq mi)
- Elevation: 100 m (330 ft)
- Highest elevation: 144 m (472 ft)
- Lowest elevation: 72 m (236 ft)
- Population (2023): 187
  - Density: 51.0/km^{2} (132/sq mi)
- Time zone: UTC+01:00 (CET)
  - Summer (DST): UTC+02:00 (CEST)
- INSEE/Postal code: 60427 /60119
- ^{1} French Land Register data, which excludes lakes, ponds, glaciers > 1 km^{2} (0.386 sq mi or 247 acres) and river estuaries.

Monts (French pronunciation: [mɔ̃]) is a commune in the Oise department in northern France.

== See also ==
- Communes of the Oise department
