= Sainte-Geneviève, Oise =

Sainte-Geneviève
- Commune
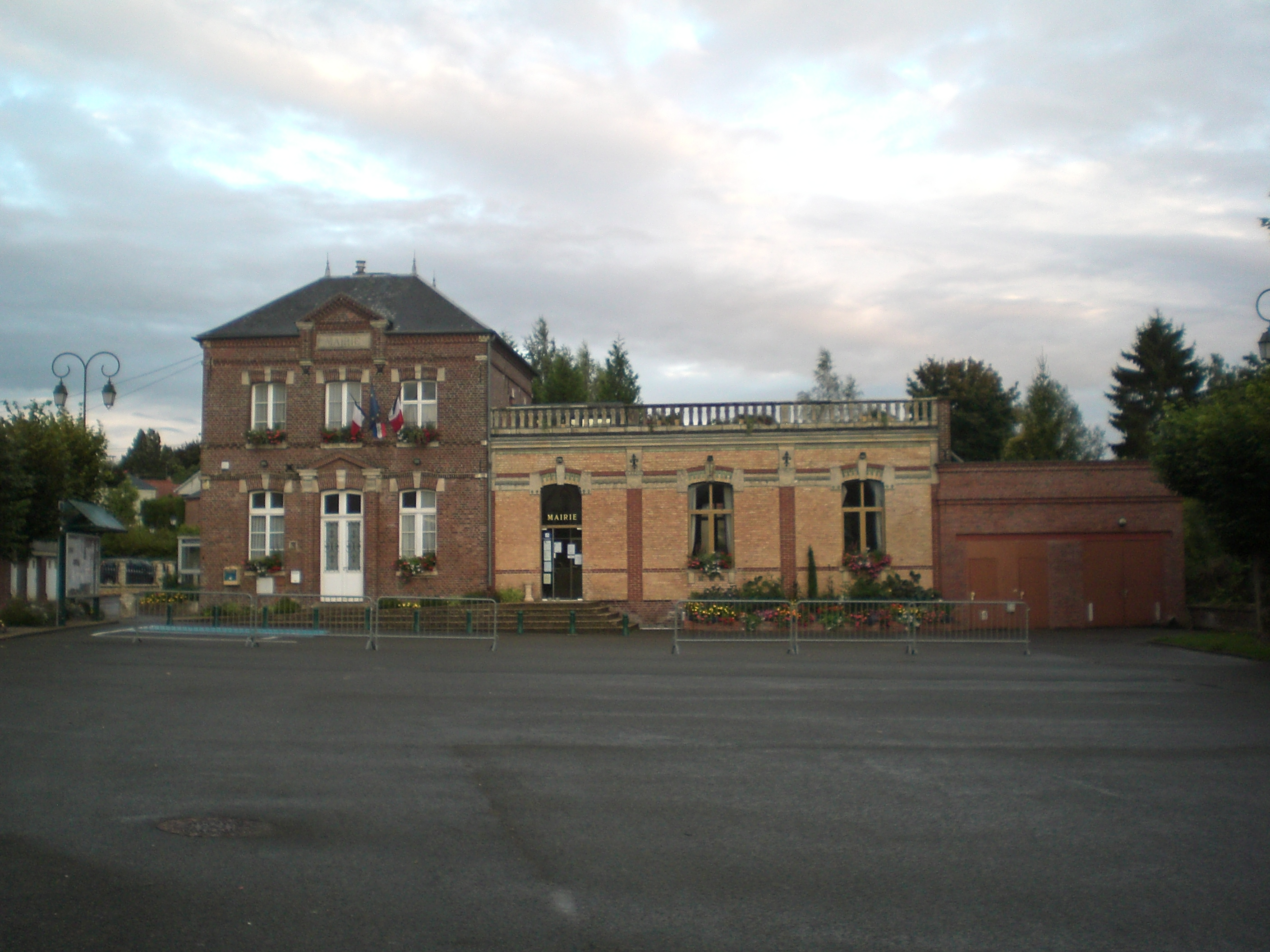
- The town hall in Sainte-Geneviève
- Location of Sainte-Geneviève
- Location within France Location within Hauts-de-France
- Coordinates: 49°17′23″N 2°11′59″E
- Country: France
- Region: Hauts-de-France
- Department: Oise
- Arrondissement: Beauvais
- Canton: Chaumont-en-Vexin
- Intercommunality: CC Thelloise

Government
  - Mayor (2020–2026): Daniel Vereecke
- Area^{1}: 8.01 km^{2} (3.09 sq mi)
- Elevation: 220 m (720 ft)
- Highest elevation: 222 m (728 ft)
- Lowest elevation: 131 m (430 ft)
- Population (2023): 3,505
  - Density: 438/km^{2} (1,130/sq mi)
- Time zone: UTC+01:00 (CET)
  - Summer (DST): UTC+02:00 (CEST)
- INSEE/Postal code: 60575 /60730
- ^{1} French Land Register data, which excludes lakes, ponds, glaciers > 1 km^{2} (0.386 sq mi or 247 acres) and river estuaries.

Sainte-Geneviève (French pronunciation: [sɛ̃t ʒənvjɛv]) is a commune in the Oise department in northern France.

== Population ==
Historical population
Year	Pop.	±% p.a.
1968	1,289	—
1975	1,696	+4.00%
1982	2,011	+2.46%
1990	2,422	+2.35%
1999	2,577	+0.69%
2007	2,639	+0.30%
2012	2,857	+1.60%
2017	3,230	+2.48%
2023	3,505	+1.37%
Source: INSEE

== See also ==
- Communes of the Oise department
