= Mortefontaine-en-Thelle =

- Commune
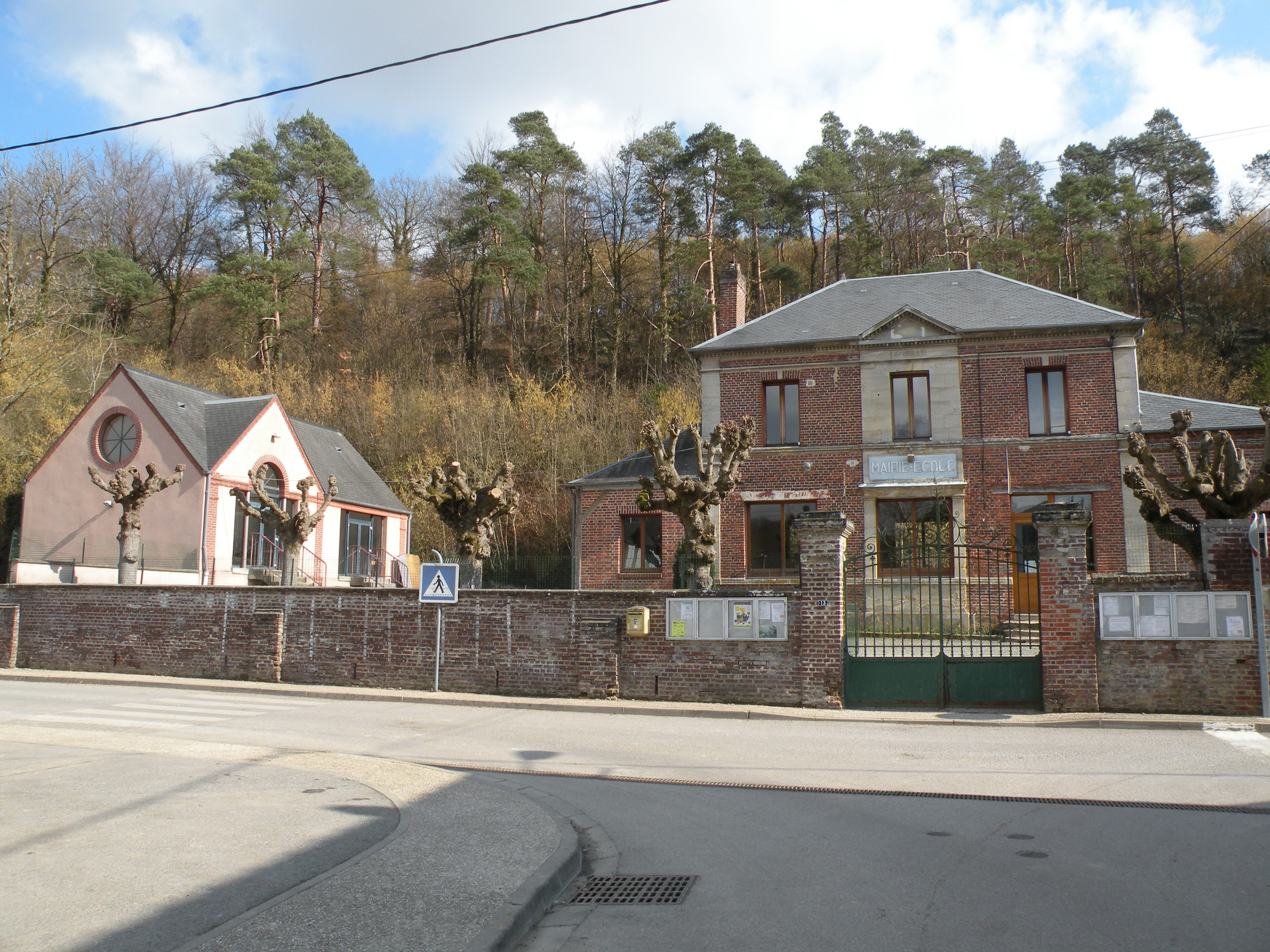
- The town hall in Mortefontaine-en-Thelle
- Location of Mortefontaine-en-Thelle
- Location within France Location within Hauts-de-France
- Coordinates: 49°15′48″N 2°11′16″E
- Country: France
- Region: Hauts-de-France
- Department: Oise
- Arrondissement: Beauvais
- Canton: Chaumont-en-Vexin

Government
  - Mayor (2020–2026): Jean-Louis Goupil
- Area^{1}: 6.02 km^{2} (2.32 sq mi)
- Elevation: 150 m (490 ft)
- Highest elevation: 192 m (630 ft)
- Lowest elevation: 92 m (302 ft)
- Population (2023): 958
  - Density: 159/km^{2} (412/sq mi)
- Time zone: UTC+01:00 (CET)
  - Summer (DST): UTC+02:00 (CEST)
- INSEE/Postal code: 60433 /60570
- ^{1} French Land Register data, which excludes lakes, ponds, glaciers > 1 km^{2} (0.386 sq mi or 247 acres) and river estuaries.

Mortefontaine-en-Thelle is a commune in the Oise department in northern France.

== Population ==
Historical population
Year	Pop.	±% p.a.
1968	204	—
1975	241	+2.41%
1982	332	+4.68%
1990	518	+5.72%
1999	737	+4.00%
2007	831	+1.51%
2012	849	+0.43%
2017	913	+1.46%
2023	958	+0.81%
Source: INSEE

== See also ==
- Communes of the Oise department
