= Abancourt, Oise =

Abancourt
- Commune
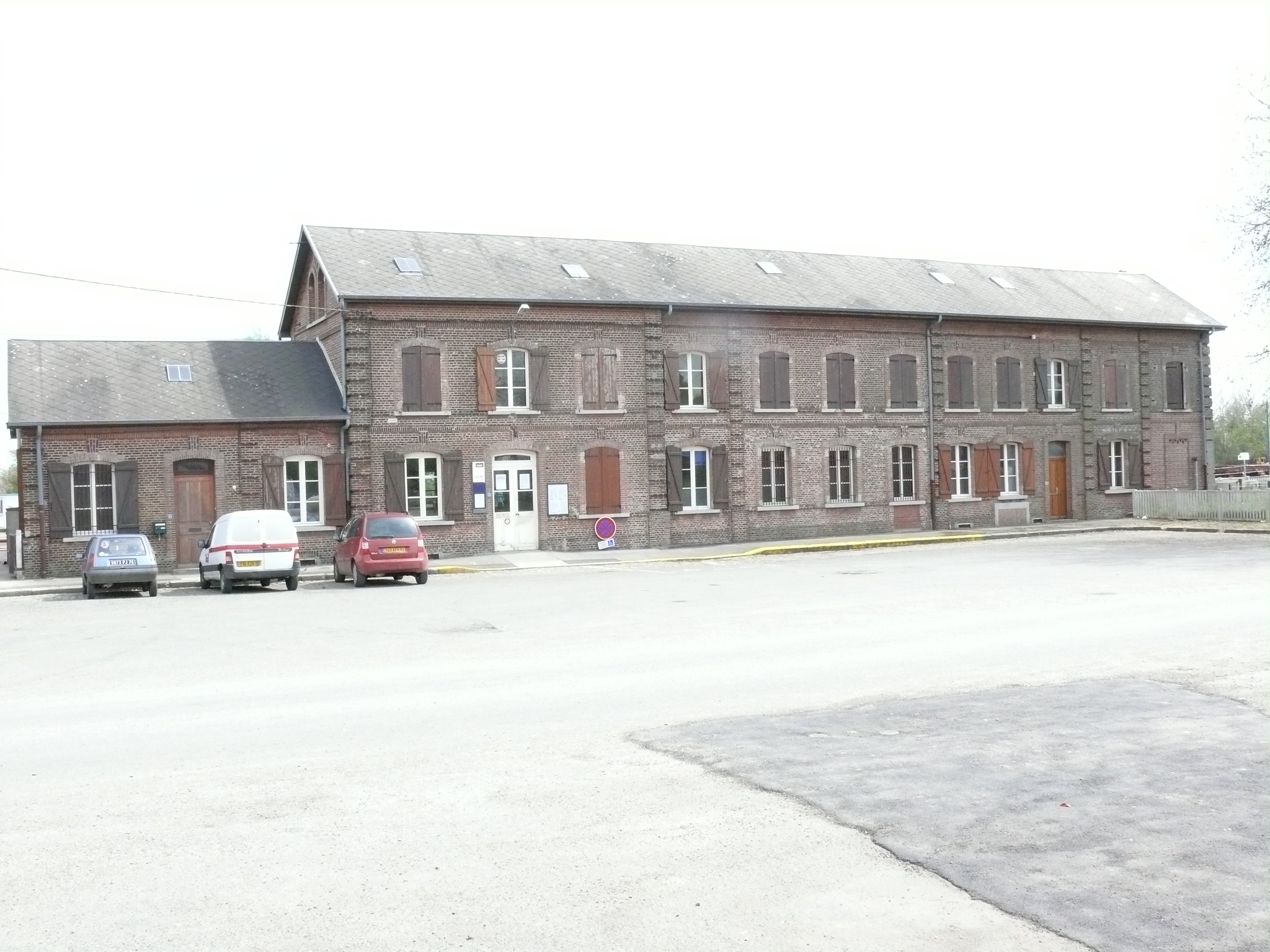
- Abancourt Railway Station 2008

- Coat of arms
- Location of Abancourt
- Location within France Location within Hauts-de-France
- Coordinates: 49°41′52″N 1°45′57″E
- Country: France
- Region: Hauts-de-France
- Department: Oise
- Arrondissement: Beauvais
- Canton: Grandvilliers
- Intercommunality: Picardie Verte

Government
  - Mayor (2020–2026): Jean-Louis Dor
- Area^{1}: 6.01 km^{2} (2.32 sq mi)
- Highest elevation: 222 m (728 ft)
- Lowest elevation: 170 m (560 ft)
- Population (2023): 569
  - Density: 94.7/km^{2} (245/sq mi)
- Demonym(s): Abancourtois, Abancourtoises
- Time zone: UTC+01:00 (CET)
  - Summer (DST): UTC+02:00 (CEST)
- INSEE/Postal code: 60001 /60220
- ^{1} French Land Register data, which excludes lakes, ponds, glaciers > 1 km^{2} (0.386 sq mi or 247 acres) and river estuaries.

Abancourt (French pronunciation: [abɑ̃kuʁ]) is a commune in the Oise department in the Hauts-de-France region of northern France.

== Geography ==
Abancourt is located some 40 km south-west of Amiens and some 20 km north-east of Forges-les-Eaux in the western extremity of the Oise department, on the border of the Seine-Maritime department. Access to the commune is by the D316 road from Aumale in the north passing through the commune and the village and continuing south to Blargies. The D8 goes south-west from the village to the border of Seine-Maritime where it becomes the D236 and continues south-west to Criquiers. The D7 branches off the D316 south of the village and goes south-west to Moliens. The D919 goes north-east from the village to Romescamps. Apart from the village there are the hamlets of La Montagne in the north and Hennicourt in the south. Except for a strip of forest in the west, the commune is entirely farmland.

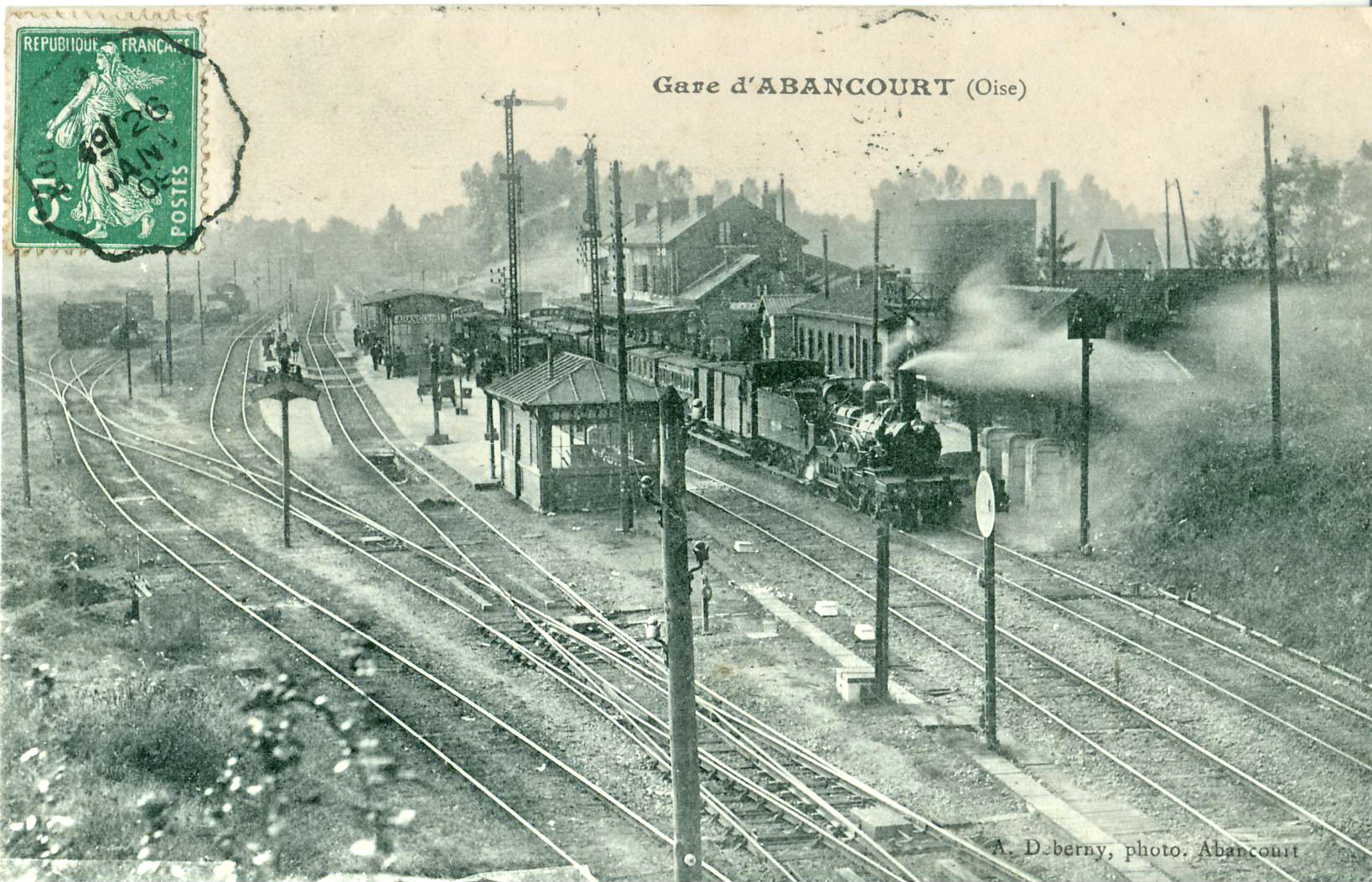
The Abancourt Station before 1909

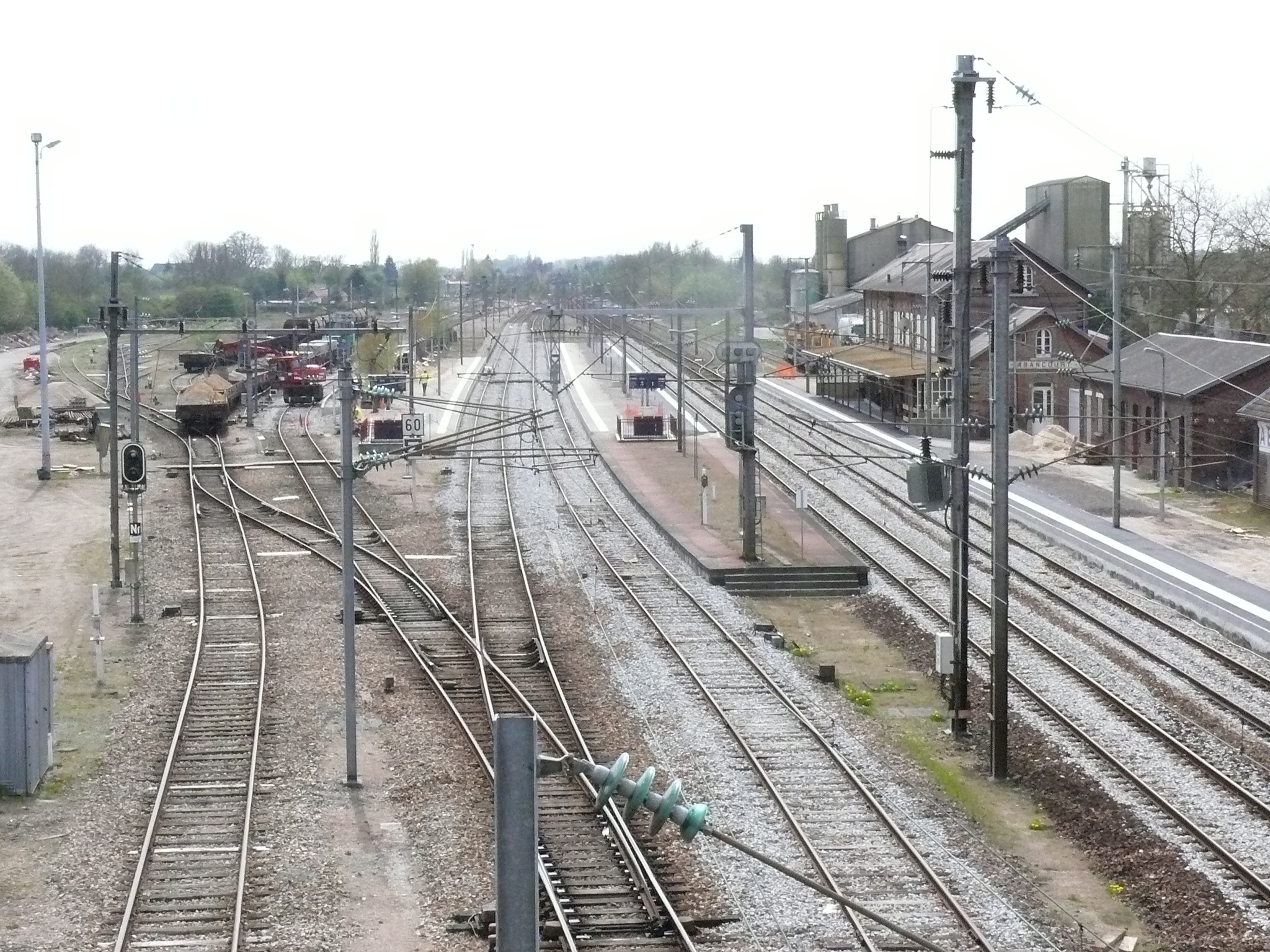
Abancourt Station in 2008

A railway line passes through the east of the commune from north-east to south with Abancourt station in the south of the commune. The station is an intermediate stop on the TER Hauts-de-France Amiens to Rouen route and the Le Tréport-Mers to Beauvais route

The river Bresle flows north-west from Abancourt along the Formerie plateau into the English Channel at Le Tréport. This coastal river is around 68 to 72 kilometres long depending on which source is used and crosses the Oise, Somme, and Seine-Maritime Departments.

=== Toponymy ===
The area was mentioned as Abencourt in 1146, Abencurtis in 1148, Abencurt in 1150 and 1152, Habencourt in 1180, Abencourt in 1337, 1454, and in the 16th century.

One Jean and one Adrien d'Abancourt were alternately lords of Abancourt at the beginning of the 15th century.

== History ==
=== Roman period ===
Ceramic tiles and amphoras from Abancourt's Roman period are displayed in the Beauvais museum. These were found near a hamlet on the mountain and it is assumed that there must have been a Roman camp or installation at one time. Fine red pottery, stepped and curved roof tiles nearly 50 centimetres across have been found.

On Abancourt's ancient Roman road lies a linden tree 6 metres in circumference, which was possibly the marker of a military border or a Celtic monument.

=== Recent history ===
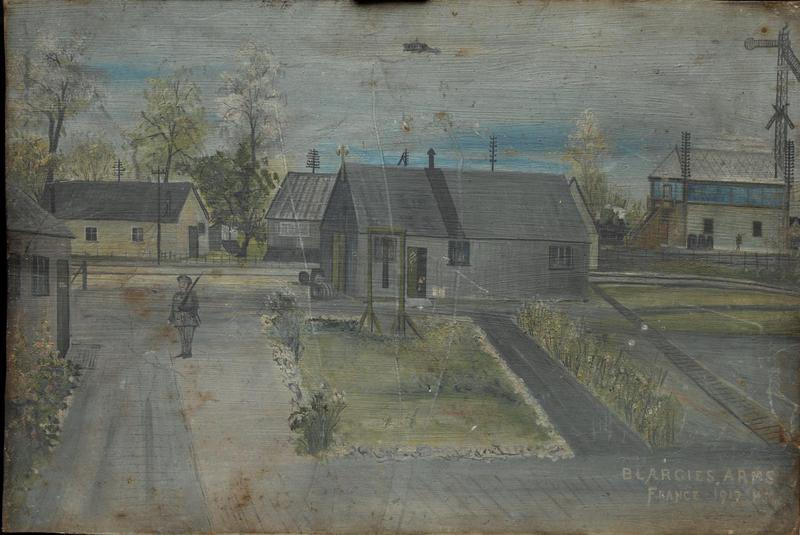
Abancourt Military Prison 1917

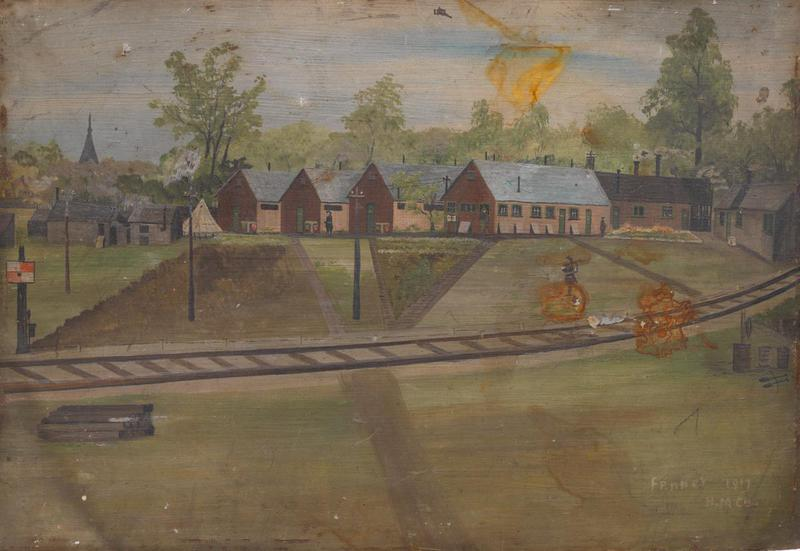
Abancourt Military Prison 1917

Abancourt appears as Abancourt on the 1750 Cassini Map and the same on the 1790 version.

The village was renamed Abancourt-la-Montagne after the French Revolution. Between 1791 and 1823, the commune was reattached to Romescamps. In 1823 Abancourt was newly created as a commune from Blargies with Hennicourt added to it.

In 1867 the railway came to Abancourt with the construction of Abancourt Station on the Rouen to Amiens line. It was connected directly to Le Tréport and Paris in 1873–1875.

In the First World War the main British supply ports of Le Havre and the inland port of Rouen had restricted hinterlands. It was necessary to find a location where the daily supplies, to maintain 1.3 million troops, could be marshalled and distributed. Abancourt, the junction of several key railway lines to the coast and the Somme, was chosen. Supply trains from Le Havre and Rouen disgorged their content into vast warehouses in the Abancourt complex along 3.2 kilometres (2.0 mi) of track. The warehouses contained enough non-perishable stores to last at least one month and dispatched twenty-two supply trains a day to the next distribution station. Today there is no obvious trace of this vast complex of warehouses and sidings.

In the First World War, the British Army had a prison at nearby Blargies. In August 1916 a serious mutiny broke out in the prison, for which seven ring-leaders were prosecuted and at least two put to death on 29 October 1916: British Gunner Lewis, aged 30, shot at Rouen, and New Zealand Private John (Jack) Braithwaite, 35 years old, shot at the prison.

=== World War II ===
See

=== Heraldry ===
Arms of Abancourt	Blazon: Gules, 2 bends wavy argent, in chief a laurel crown Or, and on a canton azure 3 fleurs-de-lys Or.

== Administration ==
=== Mayors ===
From	To	Name	Party	Position
	1962	Paul Rouvier		
1989	2001	Nicole Lefevre		
2001	2008	Emmanual Potvin	DVG	
2008	Current	Jean-Louis Dor	LC	Retired

=== Intercommunality ===
Abancourt is a member of the Community of communes of Picardie Vert, which comprises the communes of Formerie, Grandvilliers, Marseille-en-Beauvaisis, and Songeons.

The commune is part of "Greater Beauvaisis", one of the sixteen constituent departments of the "Region of Hauts-de-France".

The commune participates in three inter-communal groups:

- The electrification SIVOM (syndicat intercommunal à vocations multiples; English: intercommunal syndicate of multiple vocations) of Formerie.
- The water syndicate of Blargies.
- The inter-communal syndicate of school boards of Abancourt, Blargies, and Boutavent.

=== Budget and fiscalism ===
The principal 2006 municipal budget allocated 298,000 euros to investment and 217,000 euros to services.

In 2010, the poll tax (TH) collected by the commune was 3.40%, the property tax on developed properties was 22.29%, the property tax on vacant land was 21.71%, and the business tax (TP) was 11.93%.

=== Urbanism ===
In 2020, 72.4% of the commune's residences were owned by their residents and 24.6% were rented.

== Population ==
The inhabitants of the commune are known as Abancourtois (masculine) or Abancourtoises (feminine) in French.

Historical population

Year	Pop.	±% p.a.
1831	615	—
1846	666	+0.53%
1872	595	−0.43%
1901	538	−0.35%
1926	558	+0.15%
1946	529	−0.27%
1962	507	−0.27%
1968	519	+0.39%

Year	Pop.	±% p.a.
1975	527	+0.22%
1982	593	+1.70%
1990	582	−0.23%
1999	567	−0.29%
2007	653	+1.78%
2012	636	−0.53%
2017	651	+0.47%
2023	569	−2.22%

Source: EHESS and INSEE

== Sites and monuments ==
- The Church of Notre Dame (nineteenth century) contains a statue Education of the Virgin is registered as a "historical object".
- Hennicourt Chapel: built by the Galopin-Mabille family in 1856 and restored in 2008.

== Amenities ==
The commune has two schools – an elementary school at Abancourt and a primary school at Hennicourt.

In 2008, the town also had a bar/tobacconist, a bakery and a grocery store, located on the Main Street.

At the railway station there is a hotel, restaurant and a bar/tobacconist.

A hall is also available for hire.

== Notable people linked to the commune ==
- In the early 1960s, the singer Annie "Stone" Gautrat, who sang with Eric Charden, lived in a small house in Perny Street, near the railway station, with her parents during her childhood. The house is located at the corner of the street at the bridge. Stone still remembers the white portico which was present at the time.

== See also ==
- Communes of the Oise department
