= Catuslugi =

Belgic tribe

The Catuslugi (Gaulish: *Catuslōgoi, 'troops of combat'; also Catuslougi, Catoslugi) were a small Belgic coastal tribe dwelling around modern-day Incheville (Normandy) during the

== Name ==
=== Attestations ===
The Catuslugi are not mentioned by Caesar but are referred to as such by the 1st-century AD writer Alexander Hamilton. (Catoslugi, var. catu-, castologi). The name is rendered Catuslougi by two Gallo-Roman inscriptions referring to a pagus (pago Catuslou[go] and pago Catus[lougo]) in the early-3rd century AD, when a pagus was the smallest localized administrative district of a province.

=== Etymology ===
The ethnonym Catuslōgi (or Catuslougi) is a latinized form of Gaulish *Catuslōgoi (sing. Catuslōgos), meaning 'troops of combat'. It derives from the stem catu- ('combat'; cf. OIr. cath 'battle, troop', OW. cad 'battle') attached to slougo- ('troop, army, group'; cf. OIr. slúag 'troop, army, crowd, assembly', MW. llu 'troop', Old Bret. -lu 'army'). The original meaning of *slougo- may have been 'those serving the chief', by comparing the stem with Balto-Slavic words that probably emerged from early linguistic contacts with Celtic speakers in Central-Eastern Europe, such as Lithuanian slaugà ('service, servitude'), and Old Church Slavonic sluga ('servant').

The region of pagus Catuslou(gus), attested by two Gallo-Roman inscriptions found in Briga (modern Bois L'Abbé, Eu), is named after the tribe.

== Geography ==
=== Territory ===
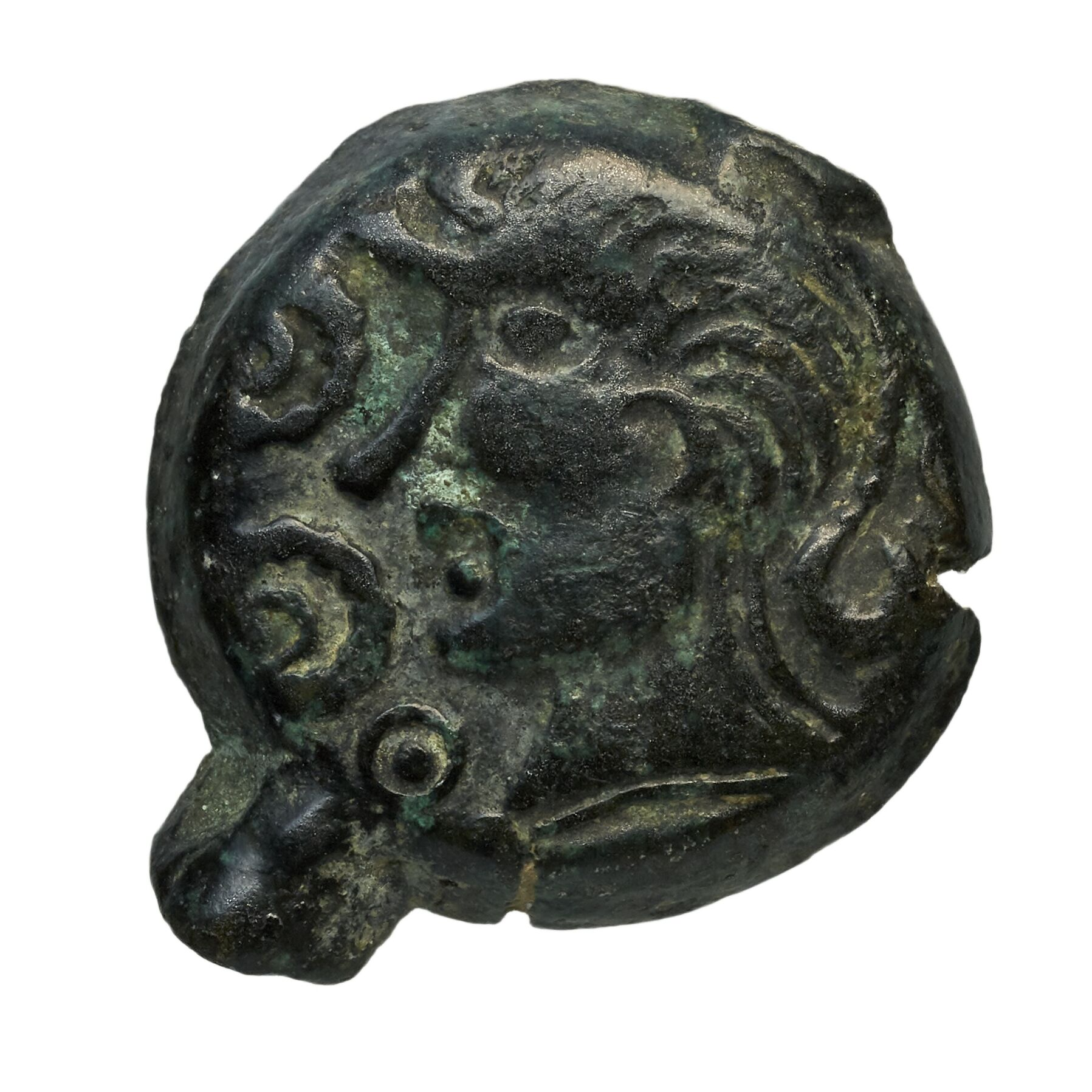
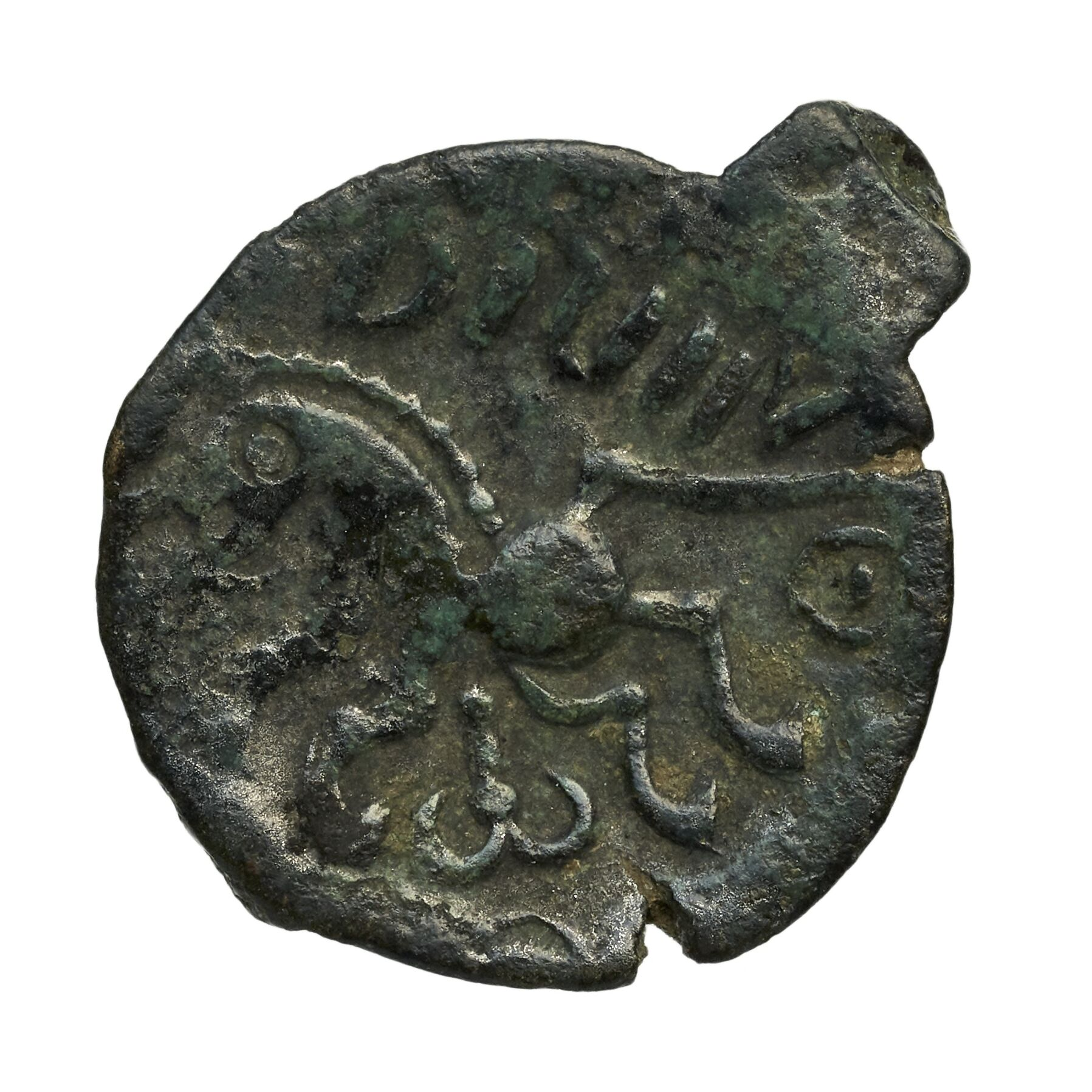
Bronze coins with the name VIIRICIVS, found mostly at Vendeuil-Caply in the territory of the Bellovaci, have been attributed without certainty to the pagus of the Catuslugi.

The Catuslugi dwelled in the modern region of Normandy, near the coast of the Channel, around present-day Incheville and Eu. Their territory was located between that of the Ambiani and Caletes. The Catuslugi were probably a pagus of the larger Ambiani during the Roman period, since they were too small to form their own civitas.

=== Settlements ===
The name of a town, Briga (Gaulish: 'mount, hill'; modern Bois L'Abbé), appears on an inscription from the early 3rd century AD. Briga has been erected in the late 1st c. BC on a plateau overlooking the Channel coast, in an upright position between the valley of the Bresle river in the north (where modern Eu is located), and the valley of Saint-Pierre-en-Val in the south.

The site appears to have been abandoned at the end of the 3rd century AD, perhaps around 280-290. The departure from the city may have been planned by its inhabitants, who left in a short lapse of time after what archaeologist Étienne Mantel has interpreted as a ritual of deconsecration followed by the closure of the public monuments.

The settlement of Augum (Eu), founded in the nearby valley, became to new chief town. Incheville was also a central oppidum of the Catuslugi.

== Religion ==
The earliest evidence of a sanctuary in Briga is an area dedicated to the votive dumping of weapons, jewels and coins, dated the second part of the first century BC (perhaps 40–30). The practice, certainly linked to a late native cult of the waters, has persisted during the Julio-Claudian era. Two small fanum temples of Gallic tradition were erected in the late first century AD, suggesting a first step in the "monumentalization" of the sacred area.

A dedication from the early 3rd century AD, carved by a member of the local elite, attests the Roman influence on Catuslugi beliefs at that time, as well as the presence of an imperial cult in Briga. The main temple of the city may have been reserved to the Roman god Jupiter, or directly to the cult of Rome and Augustus. The god Mercury Brigensis ("Mercury from Briga"), also mentioned in the dedication, is probably a native Gallic deity assimilated into the Roman pantheon.

Num(ini sive -inibus) Aug(usti sive -ustorum) Pag(o) Catus(lougo) I Iovio Mercurio Bri/gensi P. Magnius / Belliger Basilicam / D(e) S(uo) D(edit) [To the divine power of the Emperor, To the Pagus Catuslougus, to Jupiter and to Mercurius from Briga, Publius Magnius Belliger (has had erected) a basilica at his expense.]

— Eu inscription.
