= Charles Haudricourt =

French politician (1858–1935)

Député
- In office 1902–1906

Charles Haudricourt was a French politician, born 7 February 1858 in Moliens (Oise), died 1 December 1935 in Paris.

== Biography ==
Working in Paris as a lawyer after studying law, he first became engaged in politics in his home département. As the mayor of his home village, he later became Councillor General of Oise (canton of Formerie), and was elected député for Oise in 1902.

He belonged to the group of Progressive Republicans, and defended the global centrist positions, particularly the logic of Republican Concentration.

In 1906, he was beaten by a radical candidate, and retired from public life.

He died in 1935 in Paris.
