= Bouvaincourt-sur-Bresle =

- Commune
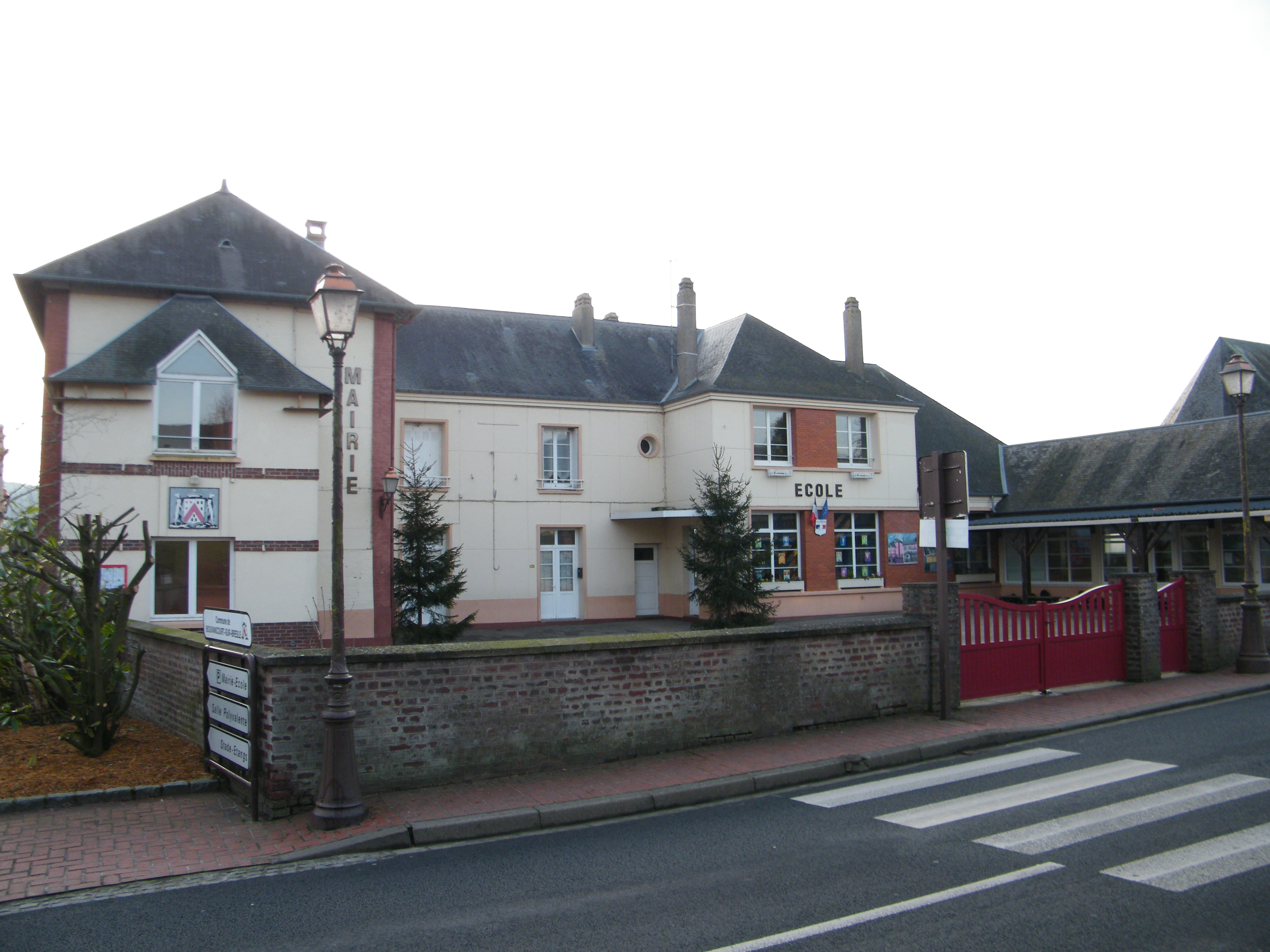
- The town hall and school in Bouvaincourt-sur-Bresle

- Coat of arms
- Location of Bouvaincourt-sur-Bresle
- Location within France Location within Hauts-de-France
- Coordinates: 50°01′54″N 1°29′25″E
- Country: France
- Region: Hauts-de-France
- Department: Somme
- Arrondissement: Abbeville
- Canton: Gamaches
- Intercommunality: CC Villes Sœurs

Government
  - Mayor (2020–2026): Yves Mainnemarre
- Area^{1}: 6.82 km^{2} (2.63 sq mi)
- Elevation: 15 m (49 ft)
- Highest elevation: 123 m (404 ft)
- Lowest elevation: 7 m (23 ft)
- Population (2023): 783
  - Density: 115/km^{2} (297/sq mi)
- Time zone: UTC+01:00 (CET)
  - Summer (DST): UTC+02:00 (CEST)
- INSEE/Postal code: 80127 /80220
- ^{1} French Land Register data, which excludes lakes, ponds, glaciers > 1 km^{2} (0.386 sq mi or 247 acres) and river estuaries.

Bouvaincourt-sur-Bresle (French pronunciation: [buvɛ̃kuʁ syʁ bʁɛl], literally Bouvaincourt on Bresle) is a commune in the Somme department in Hauts-de-France in northern France.

== Geography ==
The commune is situated on the D1015 road, by the banks of the river Bresle, the border with the Seine-Maritime département, 32 kilometres (20 mi) west of Abbeville and bordered by the Eu forest.

== Population ==
Historical population
Year	Pop.	±% p.a.
1968	618	—
1975	542	−1.86%
1982	569	+0.70%
1990	635	+1.38%
1999	694	+0.99%
2007	819	+2.09%
2012	815	−0.10%
2017	868	+1.27%
2023	783	−1.70%
Source: INSEE

== See also ==
- Communes of the Somme department
- Gravel pits of Incheville and Bouvaincourt
