= Gravel pits of Incheville and Bouvaincourt =

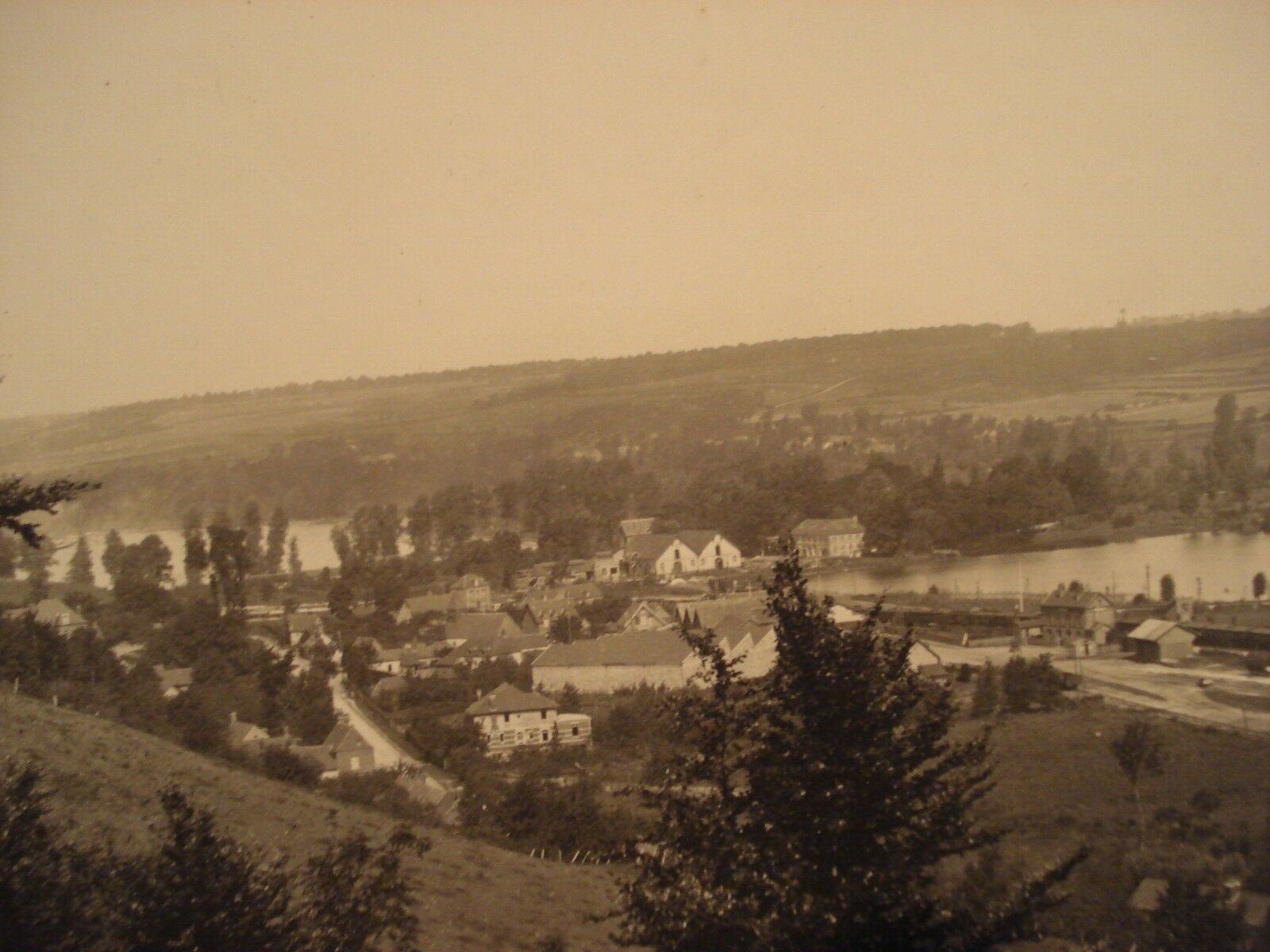
Incheville with the two white houses of the oil mill (La Huilerie)

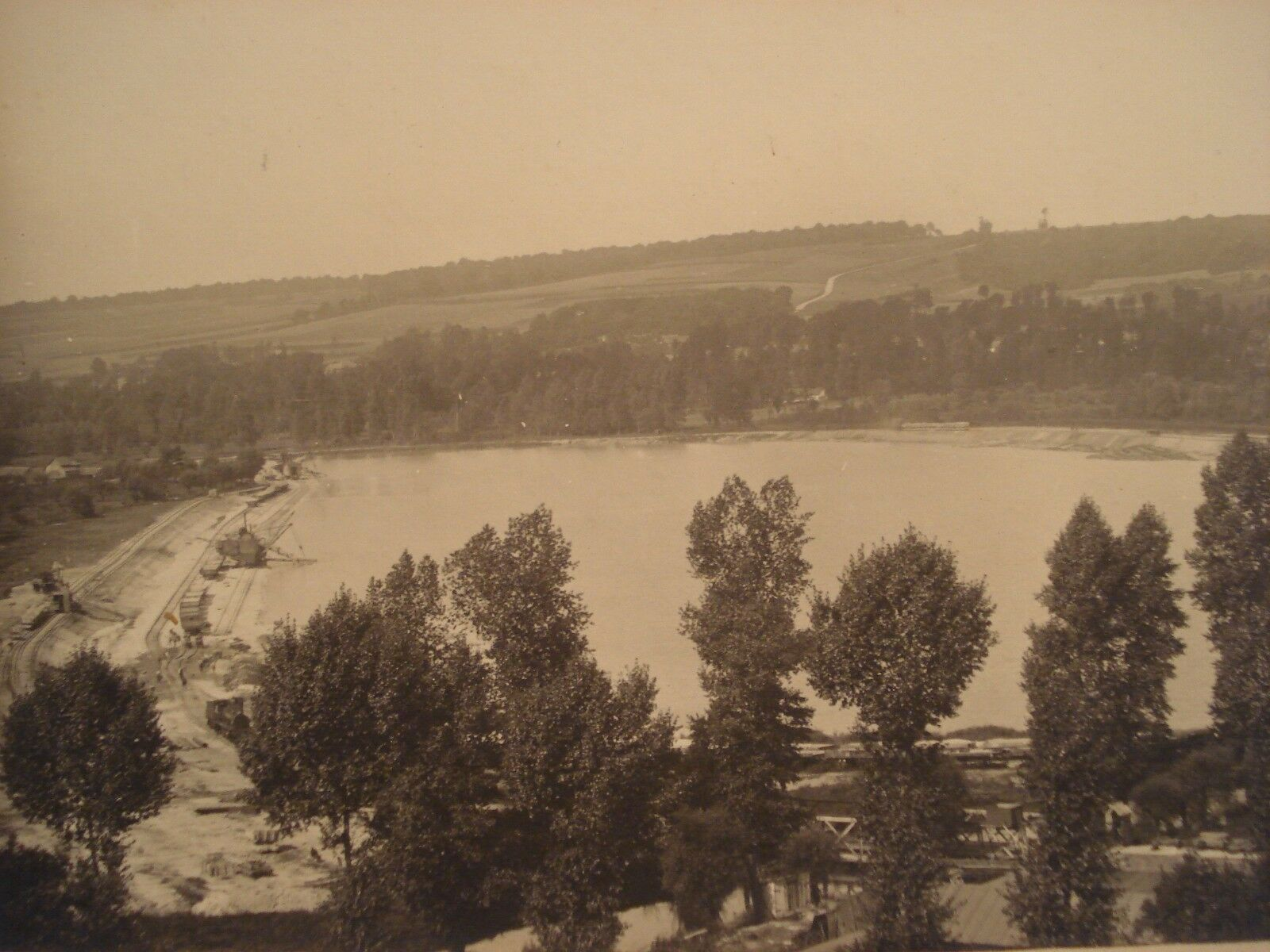
Three bucket chain excavators near the sugar mill at the L’Étang d’Incheville

The Gravel pits of Incheville and Bouvaincourt (French Les Ballastières de Incheville et Bouvaincourt) are now several lakes in the valley of the Bresle in France, which are used for recreation or fishing.

== Location ==
The gravel pits, which were already full of water during open-cast gravel mining, are located between Incheville, Bouvaincourt-sur-Bresle and Beauchamps on the border between Département Seine-Maritime in the Region Normandy and the Département Somme in the Region Hauts-de-France. The lakes have the following names:

- L’Étang d’Incheville, 35 ha (50.0089°N 1.5096°E)
- Étangs Communaux:
  - L’Étang de Saint Sauveur, 21 ha (50.032666°N 1.477738°E)
  - L’Étang de Cantepie, 16 ha (50.028266°N 1.482837°E)
  - L’Étang du Ski Nautique (water ski lake), 13 ha (50.024075°N 1.496527°E)
  - La Ballastière, 11 ha (50.021787°N 1.492192°E)
  - Petit Étang, 4 ha (50.022586°N 1.495497°E)

== History ==
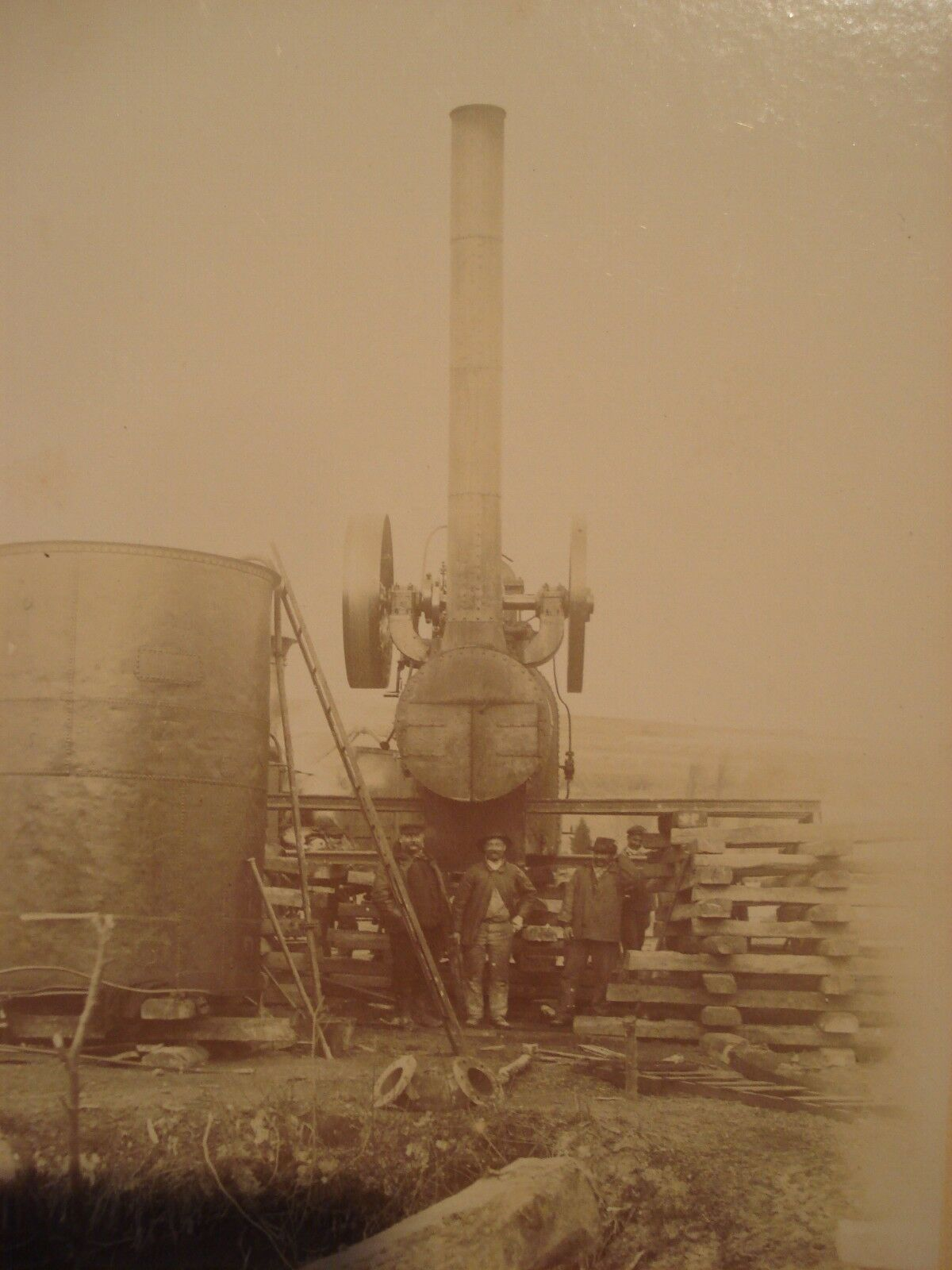
Steam engine at La Ballastière, 1903

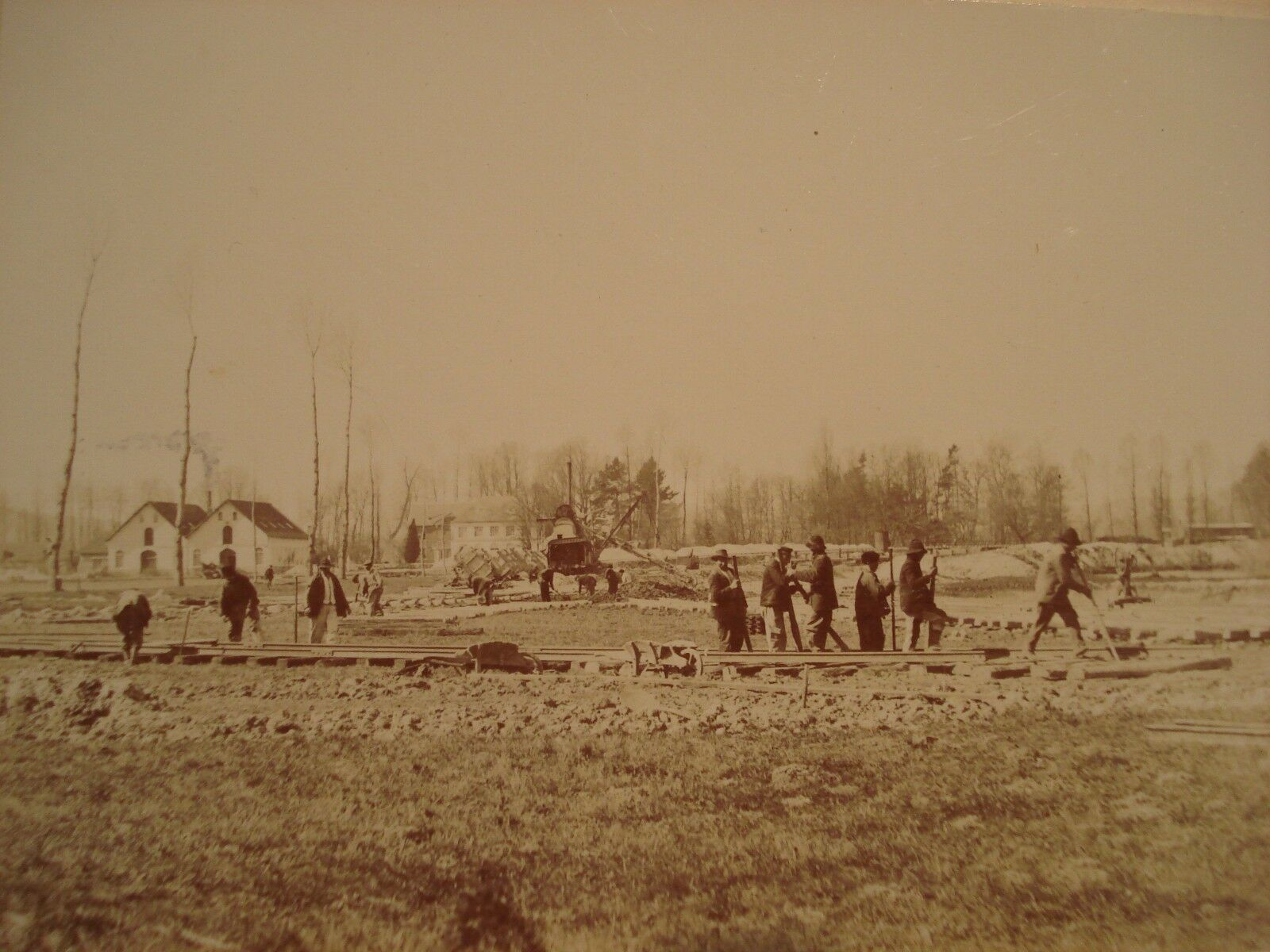
Bucket chain excavator and light railway at La Ballastière of Chantiers Drouard near the oil mill (La Huilerie), 1906

After the nearby station of Incheville opened in 1873, there was a previously unknown demand for ballast for railway construction. During the construction of the Épinay-Villetaneuse-Le Tréport-Mers railway from 1872 to 1877, the gravel pit south-west of the sugar mill was opened at what is now L'Étang d'Incheville with three new bucket-chain dredgers and then continued to expand.

At the Incheville railway station and at the oil mill (La Huilerie) in Moulin de Bouvaincourt, the gravel was processed on a large scale from 1902 onwards into ballast, which was needed in large quantities for the construction of the state railways. For this purpose, the Chantiers Drouard used steam engines for the stone crusher and bucket dredger.

== Light railway ==
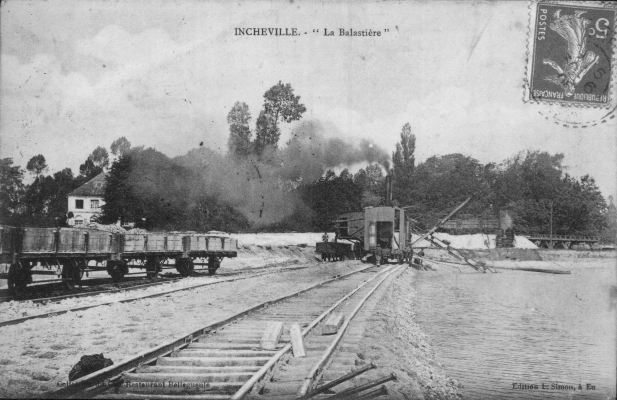
Girafe type tipping waggon at the bucket chain excavator

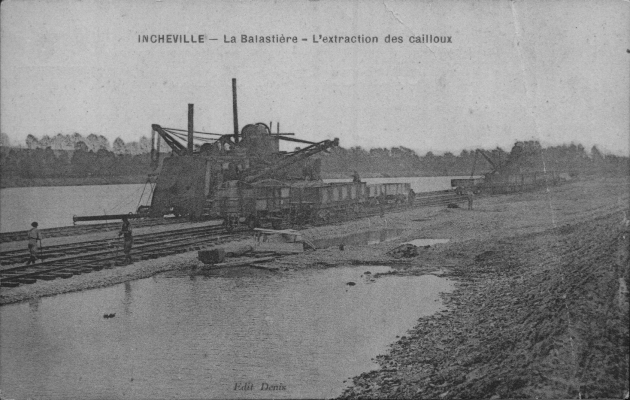
Two large bucket chain excavators

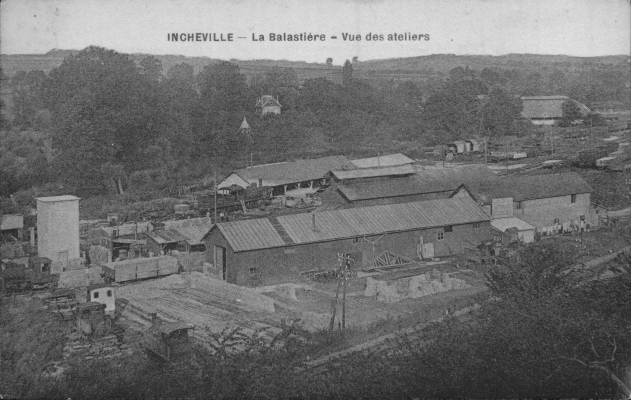
Five steam locomotives at the gravel and ballast works

For the transport of gravel, sand and ballast, a standard gauge light railway was used, laid with temporarily laid rail tracks. Unlike what was often the case in France, the rails were laid on wooden sleepers and wooden tipping wagons of the Girafe type were used, rather than portable track and V-skip wagons common on narrow gauge Decauville railways. The wooden tipping wagons were advantageous in combination with the bucket dredgers used on the banks of the lakes, while tipping lorries were preferred for manual loading by workers with shovels.
