= Gautrat =

Gautrat is a surname. Notable people with the surname include:

- Annie Gautrat (born 1947), better known as Stone, French singer and actor
- Fabrice Gautrat (born 1987), American soccer player and coach
- Morgan Gautrat (born 1993), American soccer player
