= Blarg =

Blarg may refer to:

- Blarg, an alien species in the Ratchet & Clank video game series
- Blarg, one of two common words used by the Alien in the web series Red vs. Blue
- Blarg, an alien species in the episode "The Big Dipper Diner" of the animated series The Backyardigans

== See also ==
- Blargh, a musician in the band Nidingr
- Tales of Blarg, a fanzine by created by Janelle Hessig
- Blargies
