= Stone et Charden =

French musical duo

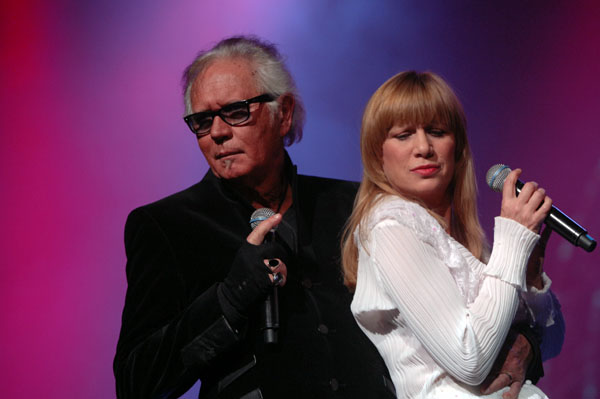
- Stone et Charden in 2007

Background information
- Origin: France
- Genres: Pop, duets
- Years active: 1972-1976, reunion 1990
- Labels: AMI Records, Charles Talar Records
- Members: Éric Charden; Annie Gautrat (known as Stone)

Stone et Charden is a famous French musical duo made up of Éric Charden (born in Hai Phong, Vietnam on 15 October 1942, died on 29 April 2012) and his then-wife Annie Gautrat known as Stone (born in Paris on 31 July 1947)

Éric Charden was born during World War II, to a French father and a Tibetan mother. In 1966, Annie Gautrat (Stone) was taking part in the "Miss Beatnik" competition where Éric Charden was a member of the jury. They were acquainted after the competition and got married the same year. Already having separate musical careers, they decided to form the duo known as Stone et Charden in 1971. They became hugely popular with "L'Avventura" in 1972 and with "Made in Normandie" in 1973. "L'Aventura" sold over one and a half million copies and was awarded a gold disc. Soon artistic, mediatic and family tensions resulted in a divorce and break-up of the duo with each member pursuing a separate sole musical career.

The two came for a reunion in 1990 with some releases and remakes.

They also took part in 4th annual "Âge tendre et Têtes de bois" tour in 2009-2010. Other artists in the event that toured France, Belgium and Switzerland included Sheila (as main act) and Isabelle Aubret, Fabienne Thibeault, la Compagnie Créole, Bobby Solo, Frank Alamo, Michel Orso, Marcel Amont, Patrick Juvet, Claude Barzotti, Christian Delagrange and les Charlots. A live double CD of the show recorded in Dijon was released.

Both Éric Charden and Annie Gautrat (Stone) were decorated with the honorable Legion of Honour (in French Ordre national de la Légion d'honneur) on 1 January 2012 just months before the death of Charden.

== Discography ==
=== Albums ===
- 1974" L'amour pas la charité... (Live at Olympia 1973-1974 (with 5 new tracks) [AMI Records]
- 1975: "double album" distribution discodis maison de disque record
- 1988: En plein après-midi [Vogue - Zélidre}
- 1997: Versions originales (Compilation album 1967-1986) [BMG France]
- 1997: L'intégrale au Casino de Paris (Double CD) [Arcade Music Company]
- 2000: 22 titres inoubliables (Compilation 1971-1999 with 3 new tracks) [Pomme Music]
- 2012: Made in France [Warner France]

=== Singles ===
(Year followed by side A then side B, with peak position in French Singles Chart and record label in parentheses)

- 1971: "Le seul bébé qui ne pleure pas (with Éric Charden) / "Le roi de la lune" (FRA #30 - AMI Records)
- 1971: "L'Avventura" / "La musique du camionneur" (FRA #1 - AMI Records)
- 1972: "Il y a du soleil sur la France" / "Il n’y a pas d'amour sans clair de lune" (FRA #3 - AMI Records)
- 1972: "Laisse aller la musique" / "J.S. Bach populaire" (FRA #1 - AMI Records)
- 1972: "Le prix des allumettes" / "Yamaha" (FRA #1 - AMI Records)
- 1973: "Made in Normandie" / "Faï doucement" (FRA #1 - AMI Records)
- 1973: "La suite de ma vie" / "Président" (FRA #4 - AMI Records)
- 1973: "L'Amour, pas la charité" / "On s'habitue" (FRA #8 - AMI Records)
- 1974: "Et maintenant si on dansait" / "Quand l'amour joue du violon" (FRA #12 - AMI Records)
- 1974: "La machine" / "Tue-nous avec des fleurs" (by Éric Charden) (FRA #8 - AMI Records)
- 1975: "Comme le meunier fait son pain" / "Toi, ma maison" (FRA #8 - Charles Talar Records)
- 1975: "Le télégramme" / "Mama, j'ai cassé ma tirelire" (FRA — - Charles Talar Records)
- 1976: "Stone, come back Stone" / "C’est si haut" (FRA #41 - Charles Talar Records)
- 1978: "Tous les avions sont des oiseaux" (with Baptiste) / "Travelling man" (by Éric Charden) (FRA #45 - Charles Talar Records)
- 1978: "L’Avventura" / "Laisse aller la musique" (FRA — - Discodis)
- 1983: "Mon père qui chantait" / "John and Mary" (FRA #69 - Carrère)
- 1983: "Carmen" / "On vient vous déclarer l'amour" (FRA — - Carrère)
- 1988: "J't'ai tout donné" / "On était fait pour se marier, pour divorcer, faire des bébés à côté" (FRA — - Vogue / Zélidre)
- 1990: "L'Avventura" (Reedited) (FRA #99 - Side Car Music / EMI)
- 1997: "On ira poser les valises" / "Les tortues" / "Le chanteur" (CD single) (FRA — - Arcade)
- 1999: "Champagne Lulu" / "Comme tu reviens" (CD single) (FRA — - Pomme Music)
