= Blargies prison camp =

British First World War military prison

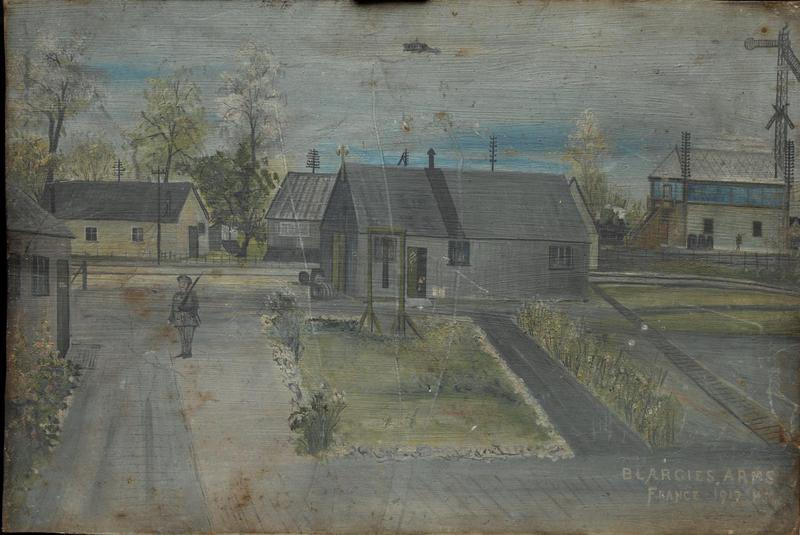
A 1917 depiction of the camp and railway line in oil on a sheet of tin.

Blargies prison camp (officially known as the No. 1 Military Prison) was a British military prison in Blargies, France, during the First World War. By 1916 it housed around 300 prisoners in 25 tents. Conditions in the camp were harsh, partly by design to avoid soldiers viewing imprisonment as an attractive alternative to service on the front line. The refusal by some prisoners to work led to confrontations between guards and prisoners and two men were sentenced to death for separate mutinies at the camp in 1916.

== Description ==
The British Expeditionary Force was deployed to France and Belgium in August 1914 soon after the outbreak of the First World War. It became British policy for soldiers sentenced by court martial to periods of imprisonment with hard labour to carry out their sentence in France. By law those sentenced to more than two years' imprisonment had to serve the sentence in a civilian prison in the United Kingdom. The desire to use military prisoners to assist the war effort meant that it became practice for those sentenced to longer periods of detention to have the sentence commuted to two years with hard labour.

By 25 January 1915 there were two camps, one containing 700 men at Le Havre and one containing 500 men at Rouen, as well as two prison ships. Eventually five numbered camps were officially established, though there may have been eleven operating in total:

- No. 1 Military Prison (Blargies North Camp, Abancourt)
- No. 2 Military Prison (Rouen)
- No. 3 Military Prison (Le Havre)
- No. 4 Military Prison (Abancourt)
- No. 5 Military Prison (Les Attaques)

In 1916 the Blargies prison camp housed 300 prisoners and consisted of 25 bell tents and a separate punishment cell block. The camp was encircled by a stockade of corrugated iron and several belts of barbed wire. It contained 12-14 latrines and little in the way of washing facilities. The prisoners' main labour was to assist the Royal Engineers in moving ammunition at a nearby railway junction.

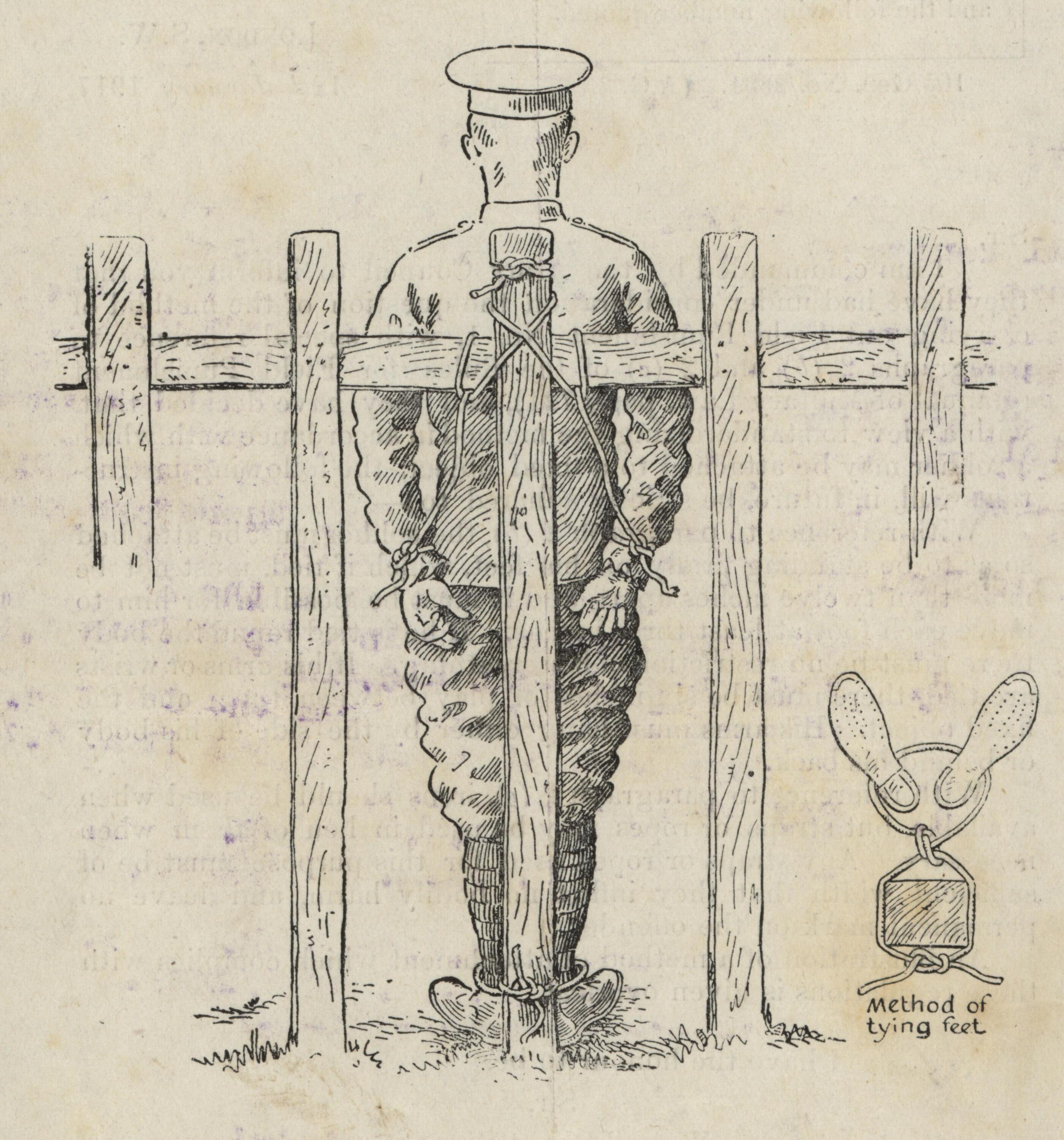
An illustration of the British Army's Field Punishment No. 1

Conditions were poor in the camp, partly as a result of deliberate practice to avoid it being seen as a "soft option" compared to service on the front lines. The prisoners were not provided with any soap, their diet was often restricted as a form of punishment, they were roughly treated by the guards and clothing and bedding were infested with lice. It was usual for men undergoing field punishment in the camp to be blindfolded, which was not the usual practice in the rest of the army.

The camp is the likely site of imprisonment of 17 men of the Non-Combatant Corps who were sentenced to imprisonment with hard labour for refusing to handle military supplies. They were visited by the minister John Wood Oman, following public appeals to the British government in the religious press over the issue.

== Mutinies ==
In 1916 the camp was the site of two instances of mutiny. These led to the first executions for the offence in British forces since 1898 when eight Sudanese soldiers were executed at Kampala in the Protectorate of Uganda. The summer of 1916 was difficult in the camp as water was short and diarrhoea was prevalent. A contingent of 35 Australian prisoners arrived in August and, on 12 August, refused to obey orders. The camp commandant, Captain Barker, granted the men some concessions over living conditions, washing facilities and the use of razors. This led British prisoners to also resist and on 14 August some 67 prisoners refused to leave the camp to carry out labour. Barker ordered that the resisters be handcuffed by force which led one prisoner to faint. One of the guards was surrounded by a group of prisoners and, fearing violence, the remaining guards aimed rifles and revolvers at the men. Barker halted the handcuffing operation and removed the resisters to a separate section of the camp. They refused to report for work the following day and, after reinforcements were brought in, were arrested.

Seven of the arrested men were tried for mutiny by court martial at Rouen between 5 and 9 October. All seven men were found guilty and on 19 October six of these were sentenced to death. Death sentences had to be confirmed by the commander-in-chief, General Douglas Haig. The court sent the sentences to Haig with the recommendation that they be commuted to 10 years' imprisonment. Haig agreed to commute all of the sentences except for that of Gunner William Lewis of the Royal Field Artillery who was identified as a leader of the mutineers.

On 28 August a party of Australian and New Zealand prisoners were working when one became troublesome and the British guard was ordered to confine him to the punishment block. On arriving at the gate he was released by a group of prisoners and taken by a New Zealander, John Braithwaite, to his tent. Braithwaite stated that he was trying to prevent the Australians and New Zealand soldiers from getting into trouble as he had petitioned Lieutenant-General William Birdwood, commander of I ANZAC Corps, for their release and return to the front lines.

Braithewaite and four Australians were convicted of mutiny. Braithewaite was sentenced to death while the Australian received two years' imprisonment (Australian death sentences had to be confirmed by the governor-general Ronald Munro Ferguson, who refused to grant any during the war). Haig refused to commute the sentence on Braithewaite. Braithewaite and Lewis were executed by firing squad at Rouen prison on 29 October 1916. The one other execution for mutiny in British forces between 1914 and 1920 was that of Corporal Jesse Short following the September 1917 Etaples mutiny. The three (and a larger number of soldiers executed for murder) were originally excluded from the Shot at Dawn Memorial to those executed during the war that was erected at the National Memorial Arboretum in 2001. The names of the three men were added in 2016.
