= Senarpont =

- Commune
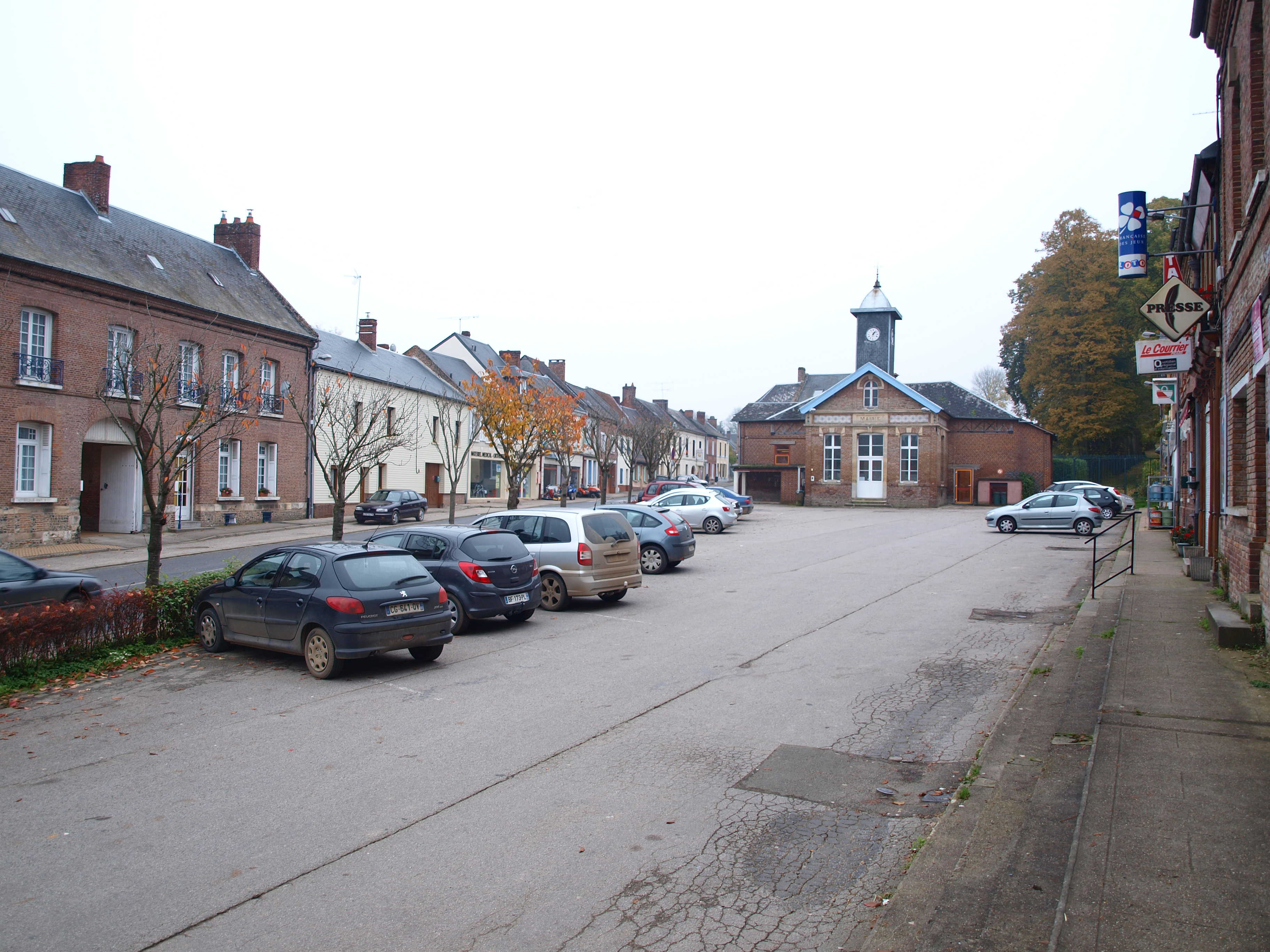
- The Place du General Leclerc

- Coat of arms
- Location of Senarpont
- Location within France Location within Hauts-de-France
- Coordinates: 49°53′24″N 1°43′07″E
- Country: France
- Region: Hauts-de-France
- Department: Somme
- Arrondissement: Amiens
- Canton: Poix-de-Picardie
- Intercommunality: CC Somme Sud-Ouest

Government
  - Mayor (2020–2026): David Blondin
- Area^{1}: 7 km^{2} (2.7 sq mi)
- Elevation: 80 m (260 ft)
- Highest elevation: 177 m (581 ft)
- Lowest elevation: 61 m (200 ft)
- Population (2023): 623
  - Density: 89/km^{2} (230/sq mi)
- Time zone: UTC+01:00 (CET)
  - Summer (DST): UTC+02:00 (CEST)
- INSEE/Postal code: 80732 /80140
- ^{1} French Land Register data, which excludes lakes, ponds, glaciers > 1 km^{2} (0.386 sq mi or 247 acres) and river estuaries.

Senarpont (French pronunciation: [sənaʁpɔ̃]) is a commune in the Somme department and Hauts-de-France region of northern France.

== Geography ==
Senarpont is situated at the confluence of the rivers Liger and Bresle some 42 km west of Amiens, on the D1015 road.

Senarpont at the confluence of the rivers Liger and Bresle

== Population ==
Historical population
| Year | Pop. | ±% p.a. |
|---|---|---|
| 1968 | 625 | — |
| 1975 | 727 | +2.18% |
| 1982 | 769 | +0.81% |
| 1990 | 800 | +0.50% |
| 1999 | 770 | −0.42% |
| 2007 | 707 | −1.06% |
| 2012 | 678 | −0.83% |
| 2017 | 647 | −0.93% |
| 2023 | 623 | −0.63% |
Source: INSEE

== See also ==
- Communes of the Somme department
