= Caletes =

Belgic-Gallic tribe

The Caletes or Caleti (Gaulish: Caletoi "the hard [stubborn, tough] ones"; Latin: Calētēs or Calētī) were a Celtic tribe dwelling in Pays de Caux, in present-day Normandy, during the Iron Age and the Roman period.

== Name ==
They are mentioned as Caletes (var. Caletos, Cadetes) by Caesar (mid-1st c. BC), as Káletoi (Κάλετοι) and Kalétous (Καλέτους) by Strabo (early 1st c. AD), as Galetos (var. Galletos) by Pliny (1st c. AD), as Kalē̃tai (Καλη̃ται) by Ptolemy (2nd c. AD), and as Caleti by Orosius (early 5th c. AD).

The Gaulish ethnonym Caletoi literally means 'the hard ones', that is to say 'the stubborn' or 'the tough'. It derives from the Proto-Celtic stem *kaleto- ('hard, cruel, strong'; cf. Old Irish calath 'heroic', Middle Welsh caled 'hard'), itself from Proto-Indo-European *ḱelto-, meaning 'cold' (cf. Avest. sarǝta- 'cold', OEng. haeled 'hero', Lat. callēre 'to be hardened [by the experience], insensible').

The Pays de Caux, attested in 843 as Pago Calcis (Kaleto in 1206), is named after the tribe.

== Geography ==
The Calates occupied the coastal part of what is now the Seine-Maritime department, namely the Pays de Caux and the Pays de Bray. They dwelled north of the neighbouring Veliocasses, and were separated from the Ambiani in the northeast by a minor tribe, the Catoslugi.

Their pre-Roman oppida were the Cité de Limes at Bracquemont, a cliff-edge site, and the Camp du Canada at Fécamp, which is often regarded as a representative example of so-called 'Belgic-type' fortifications.

In the early Roman Empire, the capital of the Caletes was Juliobona (modern Lillebonne). Founded in the Augustan period, the city developed mainly during the 1st and 2nd centuries AD, before being destroyed by a fire toward the end of the 3rd century and subsequently losing its status as a civitas capital. Another Caletes settlement was located on the Seine estuary at Caracotinum/Gravinum (modern Harfleur), founded around 15 AD.

== History ==
During the Gallic Wars, the Caletes are said to have supplied a contingent of 10,000 men to the Belgic coalition in 57 BC, but this force appears to have been markedly smaller in 52 BC, when they are recorded as being associated with the Armorican peoples lining the Ocean, for a total of 20,000 men. They reappear the following year in the Belgic coalition formed around the Bellovaci.

== Culture ==
Whether the Catales should be regarded as Gallic or Belgic is debatable. Caesar appears to attribute them to Belgica, their coins were of Belgic type, and they joined the Belgic opposition to Rome 57 BC. But, elsewhere, Caesar lists them along Armorican peoples, and they were not, unless briefly, part of the province of Gallia Belgica under the Roman Empire.
