= Incheville =

- Commune
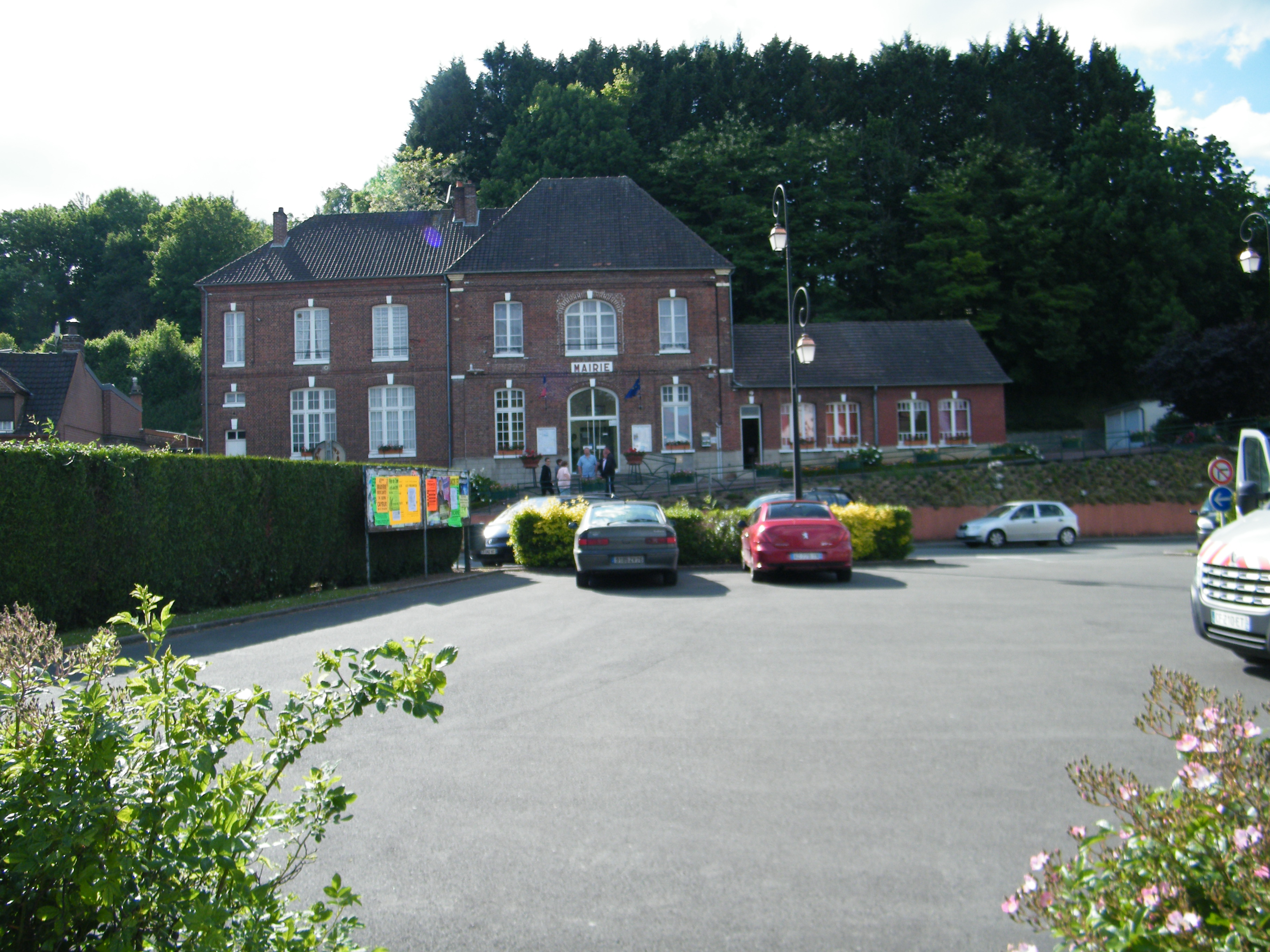
- The town hall in Incheville

- Coat of arms
- Location of Incheville
- Location within France Location within Normandy
- Coordinates: 50°00′42″N 1°29′40″E
- Country: France
- Region: Normandy
- Department: Seine-Maritime
- Arrondissement: Dieppe
- Canton: Eu
- Intercommunality: CC Villes Sœurs

Government
  - Mayor (2026–32): Nicolas Catteau
- Area^{1}: 7.89 km^{2} (3.05 sq mi)
- Elevation: 17 m (56 ft)
- Highest elevation: 142 m (466 ft)
- Lowest elevation: 10 m (33 ft)
- Population (2023): 1,121
  - Density: 142/km^{2} (368/sq mi)
- Time zone: UTC+01:00 (CET)
  - Summer (DST): UTC+02:00 (CEST)
- INSEE/Postal code: 76374 /76117
- ^{1} French Land Register data, which excludes lakes, ponds, glaciers > 1 km^{2} (0.386 sq mi or 247 acres) and river estuaries.

Incheville (French pronunciation: [ɛ̃ʃvil]) is a commune in the Seine-Maritime department in the Normandy region in northern France.

== Geography ==
A village of forestry, farming and light industry situated by the banks of the river Bresle in the Pays de Bray, some 23 miles (37 km) northeast of Dieppe at the junction of the D49 and the D58 roads.

== Heraldry ==
Arms of Incheville	The arms of Incheville are blazoned : Azure, a ratchet wheel argent, on a chief gules a leopard Or, armed and langued azure.

== Population ==
Historical population
Year	Pop.	±% p.a.
1968	1,457	—
1975	1,521	+0.62%
1982	1,673	+1.37%
1990	1,484	−1.49%
1999	1,431	−0.40%
2007	1,381	−0.44%
2012	1,309	−1.07%
2017	1,247	−0.97%
2023	1,121	−1.76%
Source: INSEE

== Places of interest ==
- The church of St.Leger, dating from the thirteenth century.
- The church of St.Lubin, dating from the twelfth century.
- A twelfth century chapel.
- The ruins of the château de Gousseauville.

== See also ==
- Communes of the Seine-Maritime department
- Gravel pits of Incheville and Bouvaincourt
