= Songeons =

- Commune
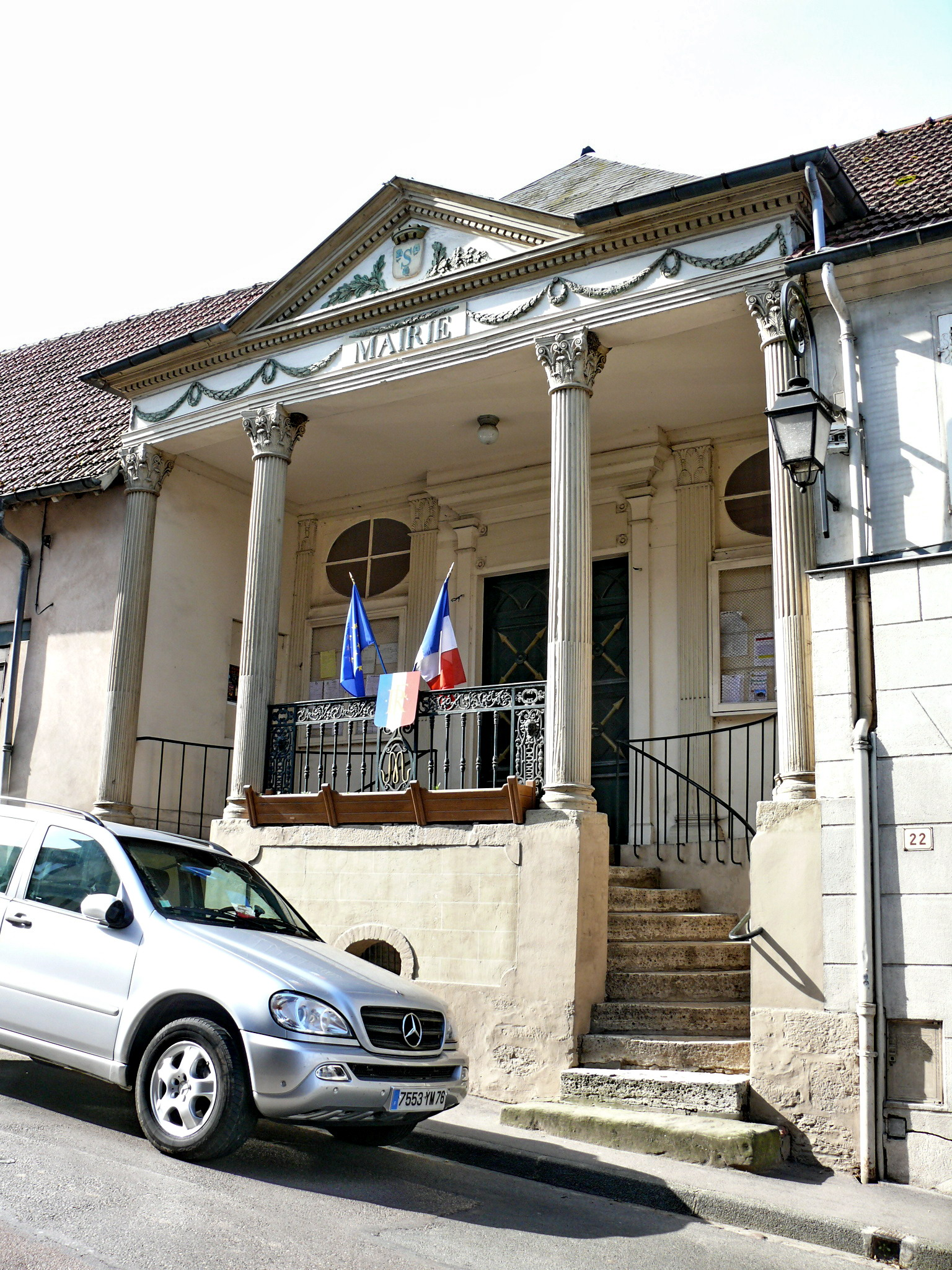
- The town hall in Songeons
- Location of Songeons
- Location within France Location within Hauts-de-France
- Coordinates: 49°32′59″N 1°51′14″E
- Country: France
- Region: Hauts-de-France
- Department: Oise
- Arrondissement: Beauvais
- Canton: Grandvilliers
- Intercommunality: Picardie Verte

Government
  - Mayor (2020–2026): Jean-Claude Baguet
- Area^{1}: 13.53 km^{2} (5.22 sq mi)
- Elevation: 115 m (377 ft)
- Highest elevation: 193 m (633 ft)
- Lowest elevation: 107 m (351 ft)
- Population (2023): 926
  - Density: 68.4/km^{2} (177/sq mi)
- Time zone: UTC+01:00 (CET)
  - Summer (DST): UTC+02:00 (CEST)
- INSEE/Postal code: 60623 /60380
- ^{1} French Land Register data, which excludes lakes, ponds, glaciers > 1 km^{2} (0.386 sq mi or 247 acres) and river estuaries.

Songeons (French pronunciation: [sɔ̃ʒɔ̃]; Picard: Sonjon) is a commune in the Oise department in northern France.

== See also ==
- Communes of the Oise department
