= Éric Charden =

French singer-songwriter

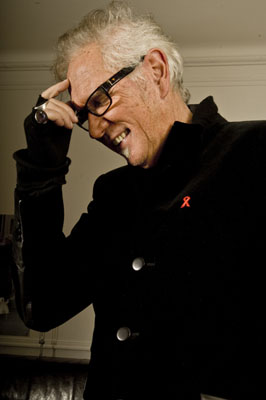

Background information
- Born: Jacques-André Puissant; 15 October 1942; Haiphong, French Indochina
- Died: 29 April 2012 (aged 69) Paris, France
- Years active: 1963–2012
- Labels: Decca Records, London Records
- Website: ericcharden.com

Éric Charden (French pronunciation: [eʁik ʃaʁdɛ̃]; born Jacques-André Puissant [ʒak‿ɑ̃dʁe pɥisɑ̃]; 15 October 1942 – 29 April 2012) was a French singer and songwriter, best known for his collaborations with singer Stone, with whom they formed the band Stone et Charden.

Éric Charden was born in Haiphong, French Indochina during World War II. He is from a French father (who was a port engineer in France and overseas) and a Tibetan mother. He moved to Marseille, France, in 1950 with his mother (his father returned to France in 1954) and graduated with a Baccalauréat from HEC Paris in 1960.

He alongside Annie Gautrat were both decorated with the honorable Legion of Honour on 1 January 2012 just months before his death from cancer at age 69.
