= Boutavent =

- Part of Formerie
- Location of Boutavent
- Location within France Location within Hauts-de-France
- Coordinates: 49°38′38″N 1°45′25″E
- Country: France
- Region: Hauts-de-France
- Department: Oise
- Arrondissement: Beauvais
- Canton: Grandvilliers
- Commune: Formerie
- Area^{1}: 4.37 km^{2} (1.69 sq mi)
- Elevation: 220 m (720 ft)
- Highest elevation: 226 m (741 ft)
- Lowest elevation: 203 m (666 ft)
- Population (2023): 95
  - Density: 22/km^{2} (56/sq mi)
- Time zone: UTC+01:00 (CET)
  - Summer (DST): UTC+02:00 (CEST)
- Postal code: 60220
- ^{1} French Land Register data, which excludes lakes, ponds, glaciers > 1 km^{2} (0.386 sq mi or 247 acres) and river estuaries.

Boutavent (French pronunciation: [butavɑ̃]) is a former commune in the Oise department in northern France. On 1 January 2019, it was merged into the commune Formerie.

== See also ==
- Communes of the Oise department
