= Romescamps =

- Commune
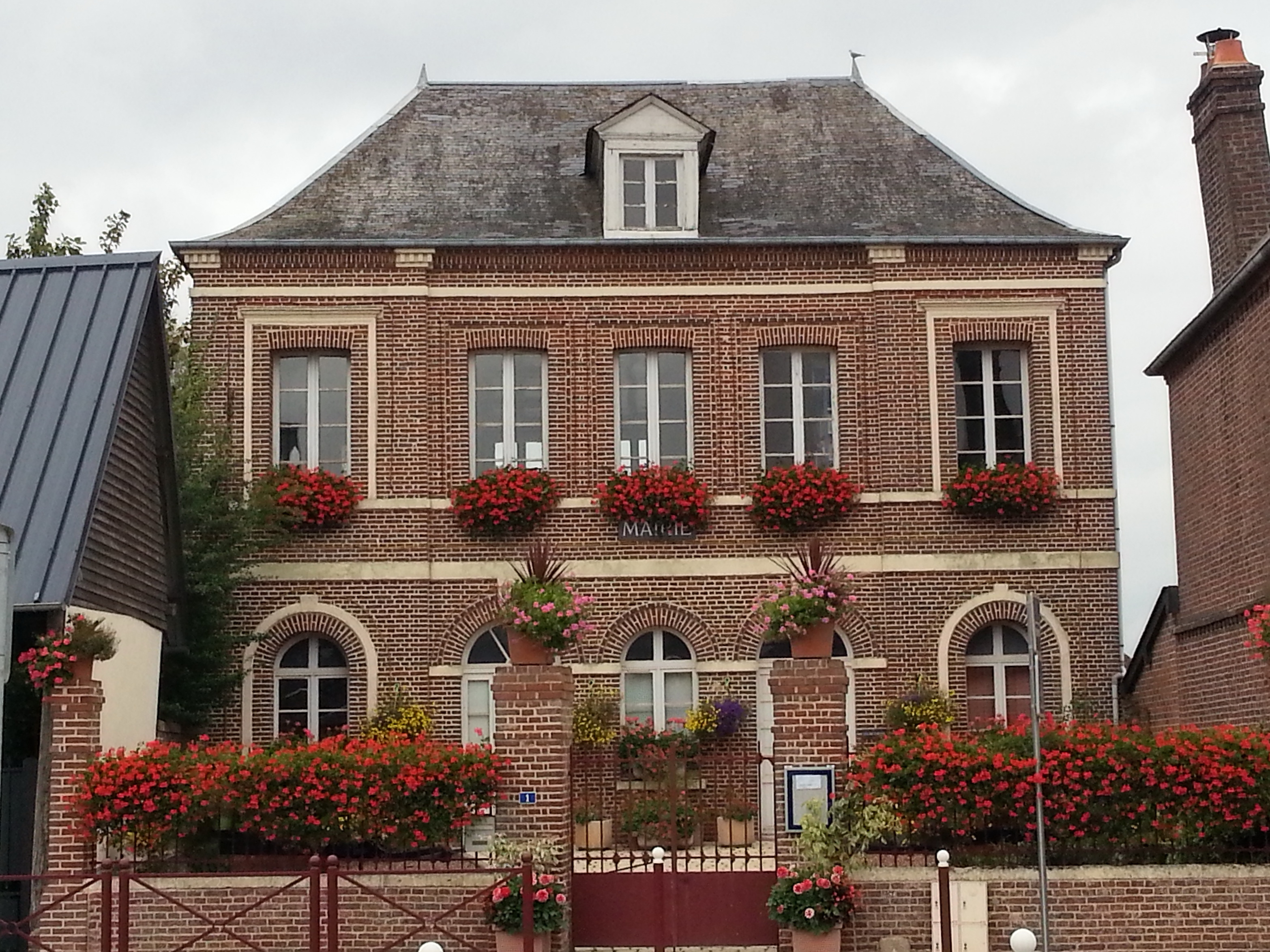
- The town hall in Romescamps
- Location of Romescamps
- Location within France Location within Hauts-de-France
- Coordinates: 49°42′43″N 1°48′20″E
- Country: France
- Region: Hauts-de-France
- Department: Oise
- Arrondissement: Beauvais
- Canton: Grandvilliers
- Intercommunality: Picardie Verte

Government
  - Mayor (2020–2026): Jacques Peigné
- Area^{1}: 10.48 km^{2} (4.05 sq mi)
- Elevation: 213 m (699 ft)
- Highest elevation: 217 m (712 ft)
- Lowest elevation: 174 m (571 ft)
- Population (2023): 560
  - Density: 53/km^{2} (140/sq mi)
- Time zone: UTC+01:00 (CET)
  - Summer (DST): UTC+02:00 (CEST)
- INSEE/Postal code: 60545 /60220
- ^{1} French Land Register data, which excludes lakes, ponds, glaciers > 1 km^{2} (0.386 sq mi or 247 acres) and river estuaries.

Romescamps is a commune in the Oise department in northern France.

== See also ==
- Communes of the Oise department
