= Formerie =

- Commune
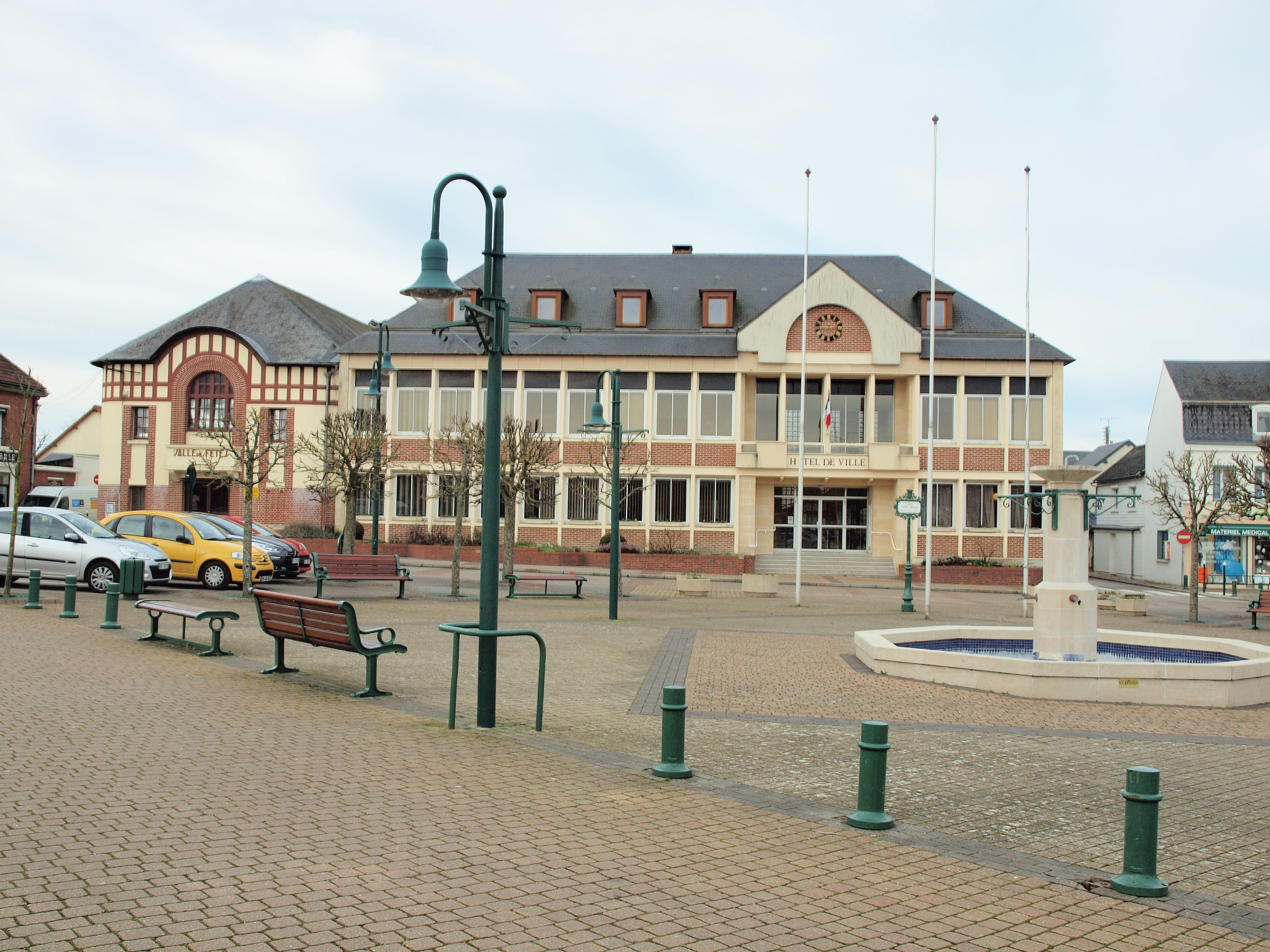
- The town hall in Formerie

- Coat of arms
- Location of Formerie
- Location within France Location within Hauts-de-France
- Coordinates: 49°39′04″N 1°43′50″E
- Country: France
- Region: Hauts-de-France
- Department: Oise
- Arrondissement: Beauvais
- Canton: Grandvilliers
- Intercommunality: Picardie Verte

Government
  - Mayor (2020–2026): William Bous
- Area^{1}: 12.82 km^{2} (4.95 sq mi)
- Highest elevation: 229 m (751 ft)
- Lowest elevation: 203 m (666 ft)
- Population (2023): 2,097
  - Density: 163.6/km^{2} (423.7/sq mi)
- Time zone: UTC+01:00 (CET)
  - Summer (DST): UTC+02:00 (CEST)
- INSEE/Postal code: 60245 /60220
- ^{1} French Land Register data, which excludes lakes, ponds, glaciers > 1 km^{2} (0.386 sq mi or 247 acres) and river estuaries.

Formerie (French pronunciation: [fɔʁməʁi]) is a commune in the Oise department in northern France. On 1 January 2019, the former commune Boutavent was merged into Formerie. Formerie station has rail connections to Amiens and Rouen.

== Population ==
Population data refer to the area corresponding with the commune as of January 2025.

Historical population
Year	Pop.	±% p.a.
1968	2,044	—
1975	2,141	+0.66%
1982	2,249	+0.71%
1990	2,260	+0.06%
1999	2,246	−0.07%
2007	2,173	−0.41%
2012	2,185	+0.11%
2017	2,131	−0.50%
2023	2,097	−0.27%
Source: INSEE

== See also ==
- Communes of the Oise department
