= Stone (singer) =

French singer and actress

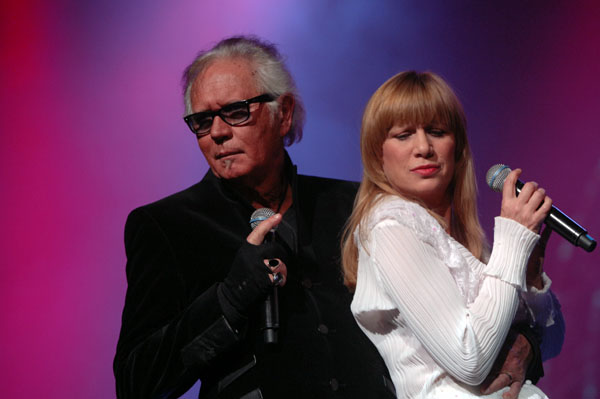
Stone with Éric Charden (2007)

Annie Gautrat, better known by her stage name Stone (born in Paris on 31 July 1947) is a French singer and actress, and very notably part of the musical duo Stone et Charden with her then-husband Éric Charden. the duo were successful in the 1970s with some hits in France and internationally.

== Biography ==
In 1966, Gautrat (Stone) was taking part in the "Miss Beatnik" competition where Éric Charden was a member of the jury. They were acquainted after the competition and got married the same year. Already having separate musical careers, they decided to form the duo known as Stone et Charden in 1971, releasing "L'Avventura" in 1972 and "Made in Normandie" in 1973.

She also took part in the French musical comedy Mayflower written by Guy Bontempelli and music composed by Charden.

Soon artistic and personal tensions resulted in a divorce and break-up of the duo in 1975 with each member pursuing a separate solo musical career. Éric Charden married Pascale Rivault, whereas Stone later married actor Mario d'Alba with whom she had 2 children, Martin and Daisy.

In the early 1980s, she played in Le Plus beau métier du monde besides Charlotte Julian. The duo Stone et Charden reunited at the end of the 1990s taking part in some television shows and galas. A compilation of their songs was released in 1997. They also took part in the tour "Âge tendre et Têtes de bois" in France, Belgium and Switzerland. Besides singing, she pursued a career in acting in theater most notably in Les 3 Jeanne and Les monologues du vagin, the French-language adaptation of The Vagina Monologues.

Both she and her previous husband Éric Charden of Stone et Charden days were decorated with the Legion of Honour (in French Ordre national de la Légion d'honneur) on 1 January 2012 just months before the death of Éric Charden.
