= Moliens =

- Commune
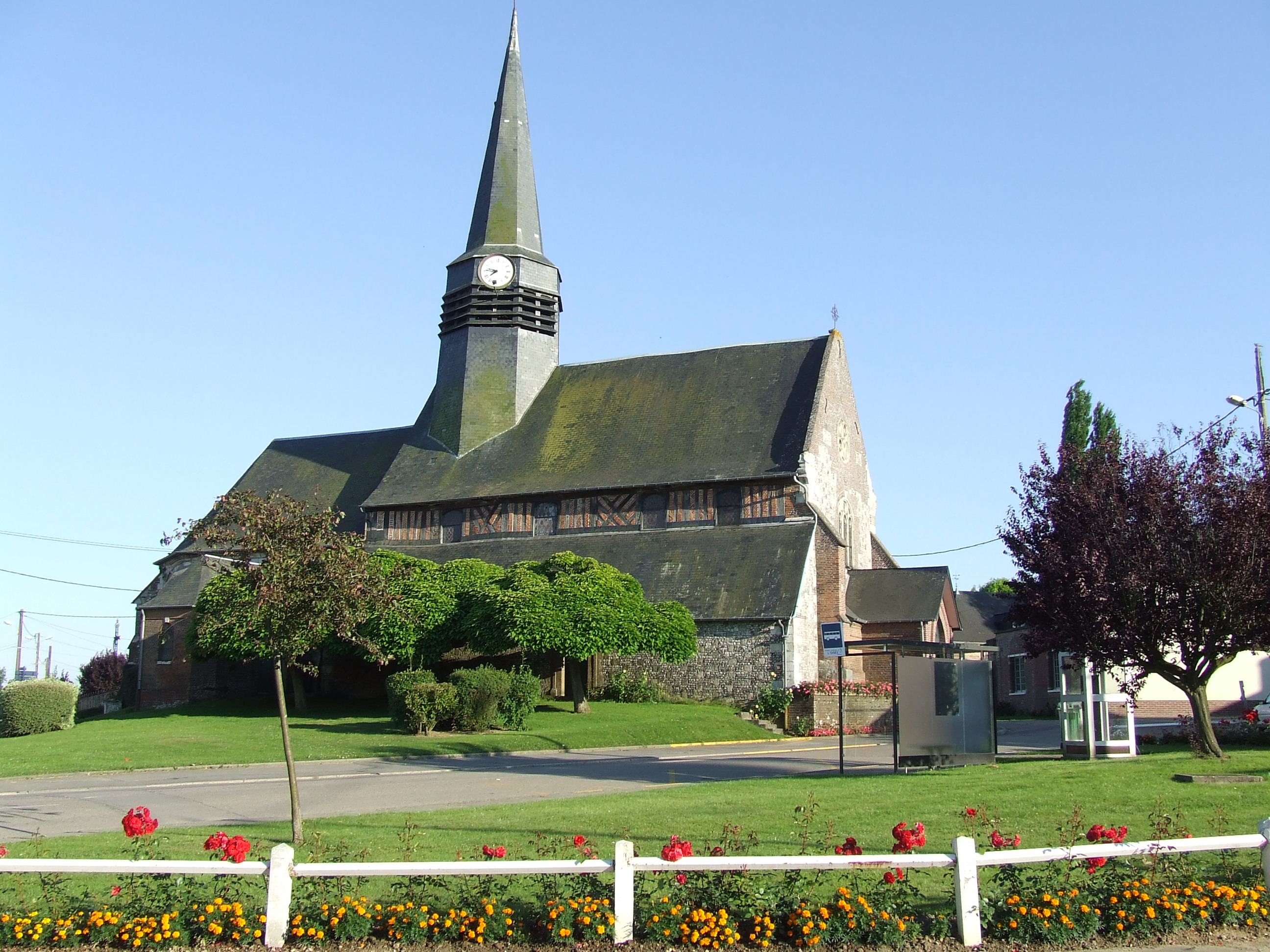
- The church in Moliens

- Coat of arms
- Location of Moliens
- Location within France Location within Hauts-de-France
- Coordinates: 49°40′02″N 1°48′38″E
- Country: France
- Region: Hauts-de-France
- Department: Oise
- Arrondissement: Beauvais
- Canton: Grandvilliers
- Intercommunality: Picardie Verte

Government
  - Mayor (2020–2026): Philippe Van Ooteghem
- Area^{1}: 9.39 km^{2} (3.63 sq mi)
- Elevation: 215 m (705 ft)
- Highest elevation: 222 m (728 ft)
- Lowest elevation: 192 m (630 ft)
- Population (2023): 1,117
  - Density: 119/km^{2} (308/sq mi)
- Time zone: UTC+01:00 (CET)
  - Summer (DST): UTC+02:00 (CEST)
- INSEE/Postal code: 60405 /60220
- ^{1} French Land Register data, which excludes lakes, ponds, glaciers > 1 km^{2} (0.386 sq mi or 247 acres) and river estuaries.

Moliens (French pronunciation: [mɔljɛ̃]) is a commune in the Oise department in northern France.

== See also ==
- Communes of the Oise department
