= Blargies =

- Commune
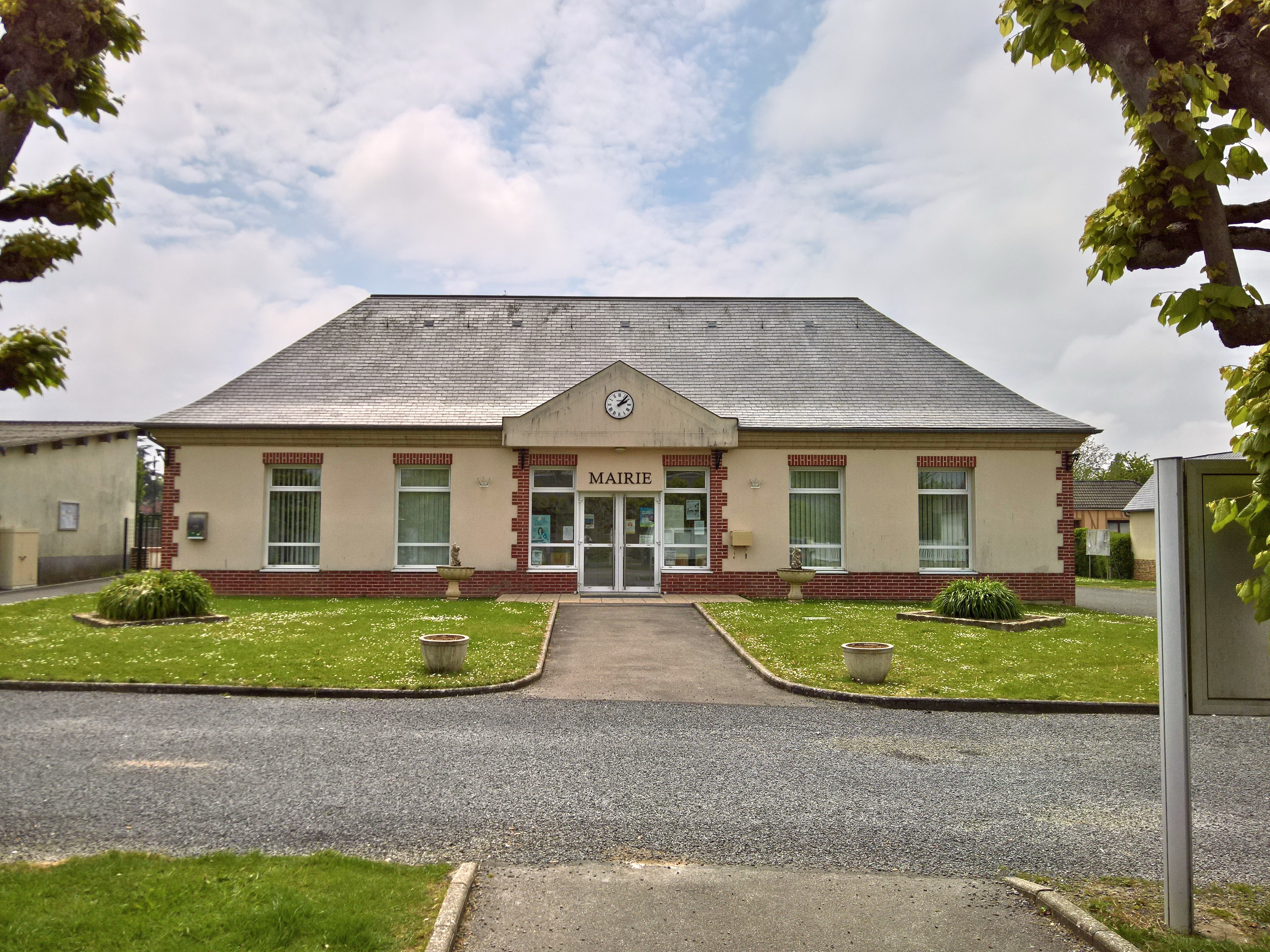
- Town hall
- Location of Blargies
- Location within France Location within Hauts-de-France
- Coordinates: 49°40′24″N 1°45′58″E
- Country: France
- Region: Hauts-de-France
- Department: Oise
- Arrondissement: Beauvais
- Canton: Grandvilliers
- Intercommunality: Picardie Verte

Government
  - Mayor (2020–2026): Olivier Hernequé
- Area^{1}: 10.05 km^{2} (3.88 sq mi)
- Elevation: 219 m (719 ft)
- Highest elevation: 227 m (745 ft)
- Lowest elevation: 185 m (607 ft)
- Population (2023): 498
  - Density: 49.6/km^{2} (128/sq mi)
- Time zone: UTC+01:00 (CET)
  - Summer (DST): UTC+02:00 (CEST)
- INSEE/Postal code: 60076 /60220
- ^{1} French Land Register data, which excludes lakes, ponds, glaciers > 1 km^{2} (0.386 sq mi or 247 acres) and river estuaries.

Blargies (French pronunciation: [blaʁʒi]) is a commune in the Oise department in northern France. In the First World War it was the site of a British military prison camp.

== Population ==
Historical population
Year	Pop.	±% p.a.
1968	408	—
1975	463	+1.82%
1982	451	−0.37%
1990	455	+0.11%
1999	450	−0.12%
2007	482	+0.86%
2012	522	+1.61%
2017	533	+0.42%
2023	498	−1.13%
Source: INSEE

== See also ==
- Communes of the Oise department
