= Bresle (river) =

River in France

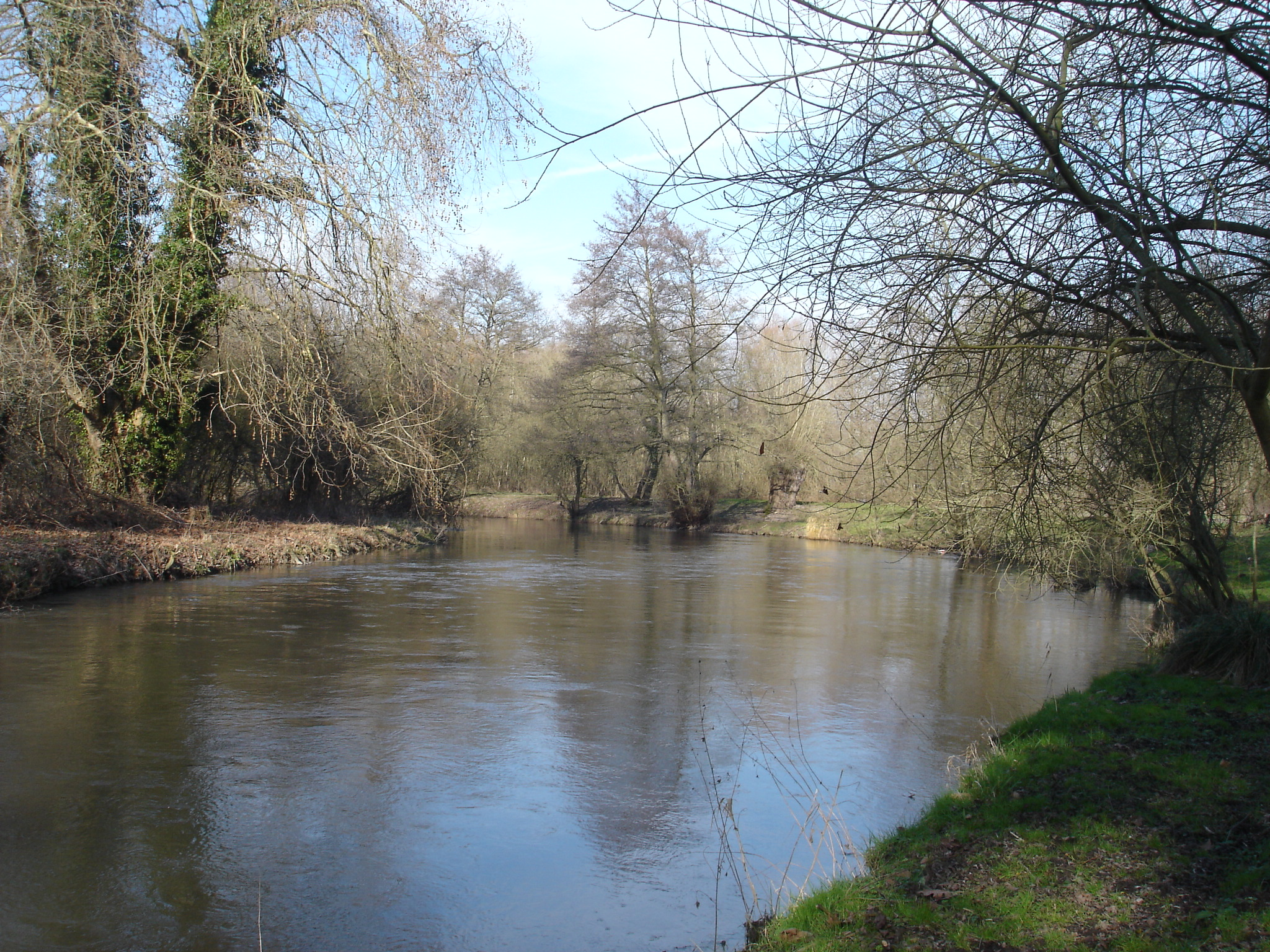
- The Bresle at Bouvaincourt-sur-Bresle

- Location within France Location within Hauts-de-France
- Native name: Brèle (Picard)

Location
- Country: France

Physical characteristics
- Source
  - location: Abancourt, Oise (position varies with aquifer level)
  - elevation: 179 m (587 ft)
- Mouth
  - location: English Channel
  - coordinates: 50°3′46″N 1°22′16″E
- Length: 68 to 72 km (42 to 45 mi)
- Basin size: 748 km^{2} (289 sq mi)
- Discharge
  - average: 7.5 m^{3}/s (260 cu ft/s)

The Bresle (French: [bʁɛl]; Picard: Brèle) is a coastal river in northwestern France that flows into the English Channel at Le Tréport. It crosses the departments of Oise, Somme and Seine-Maritime. Its length is given as 68.1 km (42.3 mi) by some sources and up to about 72 km depending on the exact position of the source, which varies with the level of the chalk aquifer.

== Introduction ==
For a long time, the course of the Bresle (especially the lower part) has had the role of a natural national frontier, serving as the boundary between powerful and often antagonistic political entities. It separated the Roman provinces of Belgian Gaul from Lyonnais Gaul, the Talou county (Dieppe) and the Vimeu during the Merovingian period, the county of Ponthieu, France and the Duchy of Normandy from the 10th century and also the taxation areas of Rouen and Amiens under the Ancien Régime.

Today the Bresle valley, which straddles Normandy and Picardy, continues the glass-making industry that began in the Middle Ages. Numerous small glassworks are located in the towns and villages along the river. The valley contains a variety of habitats supporting diverse flora and fauna, and the river’s water quality allows populations of salmon and sea trout.

== Etymology ==
In his Géographie, Ptolemy called it the Phroudis. Until the 13th century, various other names were given to the river: Auvae fluvium, Aucia fluvium, Auga in the 10th century and Ou in the 11th century. When the Normans arrived, they called it the Brisela. It has been subsequently noted in various documents as Bresla, Brella, Breselle, Briselle, Brisele, Brisella before the definitive name was agreed at the end of the 17th century.

== Geography ==
The course of the Bresle as the border between Normandy and Picardie

The source is normally located at Abancourt in the Oise department, in the Bois à Saules, at an elevation of approximately 179–180 m. Because the river is strongly fed by the chalk aquifer, the actual emergence point shifts: higher water-table levels push the source upstream toward Blargies, while low levels move it downstream toward the hamlet of Hadancourt (Criquiers). From its source the Bresle flows generally northwest across the Formerie plateau, receiving the Ménillet and Méline. At Senarpont it is joined by its principal tributary, the Liger. It then turns west-northwest, following the regional structural direction shared by most rivers of Seine-Maritime and the Somme. After receiving the Vimeuse at Gamaches, the river divides into several arms (including the Teinturerie and the Busine) near Eu; a canalised section runs between Eu and Le Tréport. After having received the waters of the Vimeuse at Gamaches, the river splits into several branches (the Teinturerie and the Busine) at Eu and a part is canalised between Eu and Le Tréport.
Between these two last places, the Bresle flows into a wide grassy valley one kilometre wide, framed by steep edges and dropping by 100 metres into the wooded dry valleys. This valley shows evidence of the former course of the river when it used to meet the sea at Mers-les-Bains up until the Middle Ages. The former estuary forms a part of Eu today, in a district known as the "Prairie".
In the 12th century, the redirecting of the course of the Bresle, rather than digging a canal, brought its outlet to Le Tréport.

The valley forms part of the northern Paris Basin and is cut into Upper Cretaceous chalk. The porous aquifer regulates flow, producing a relatively stable regime with sustained low-water periods and moderate floods.

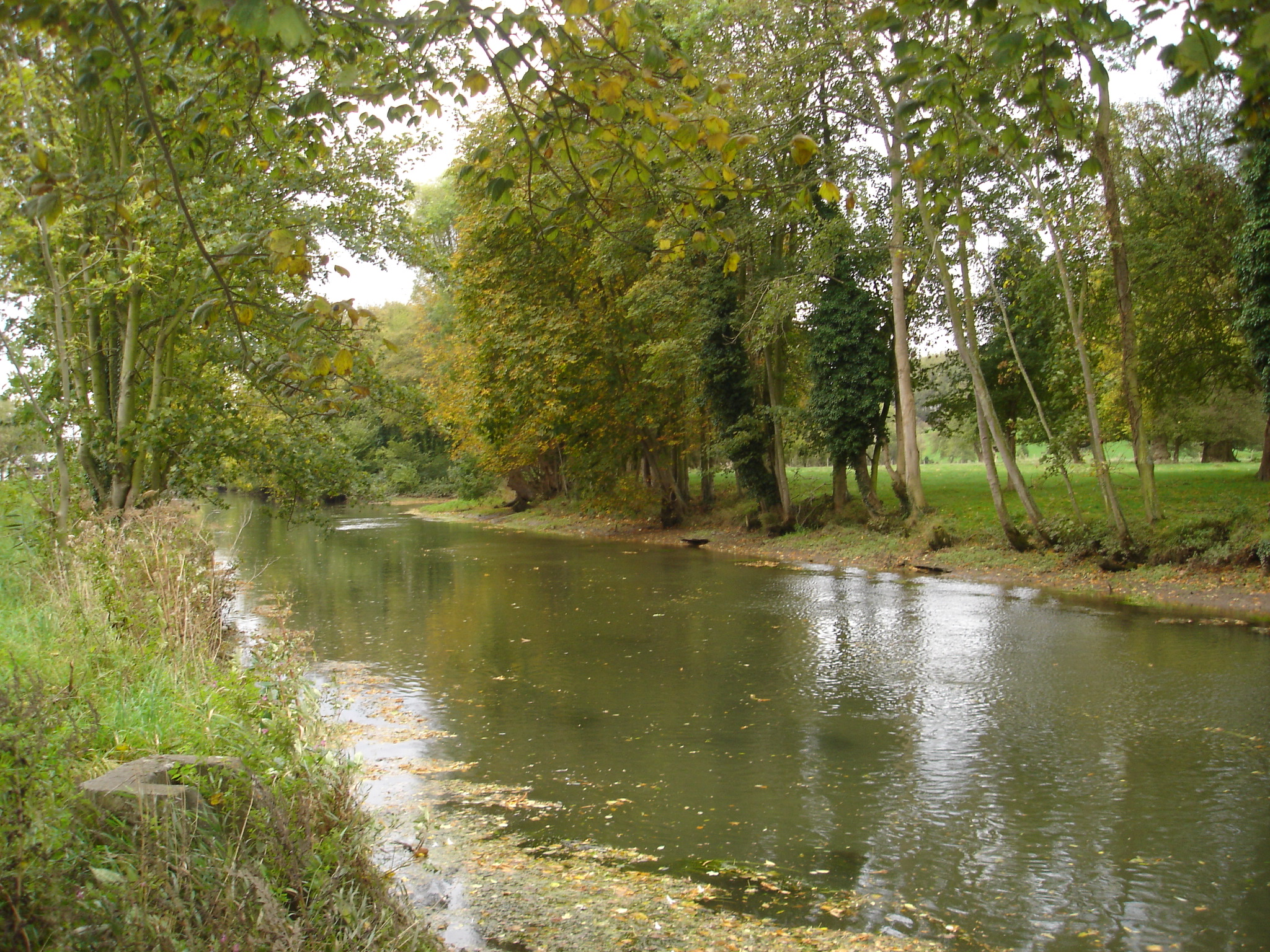
The canalised Bresle

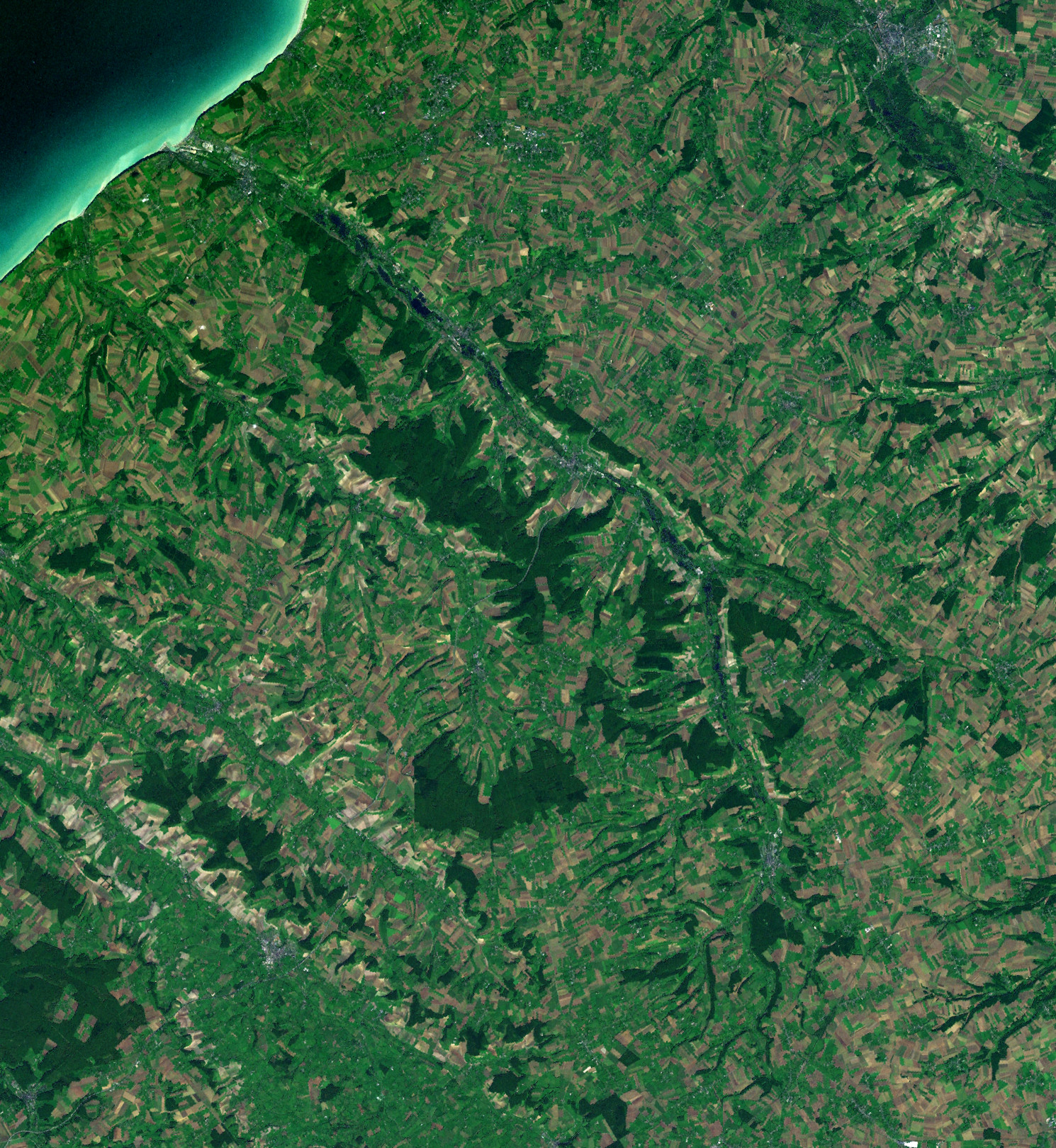
Satellite view of the Bresle

Map of the Bresle

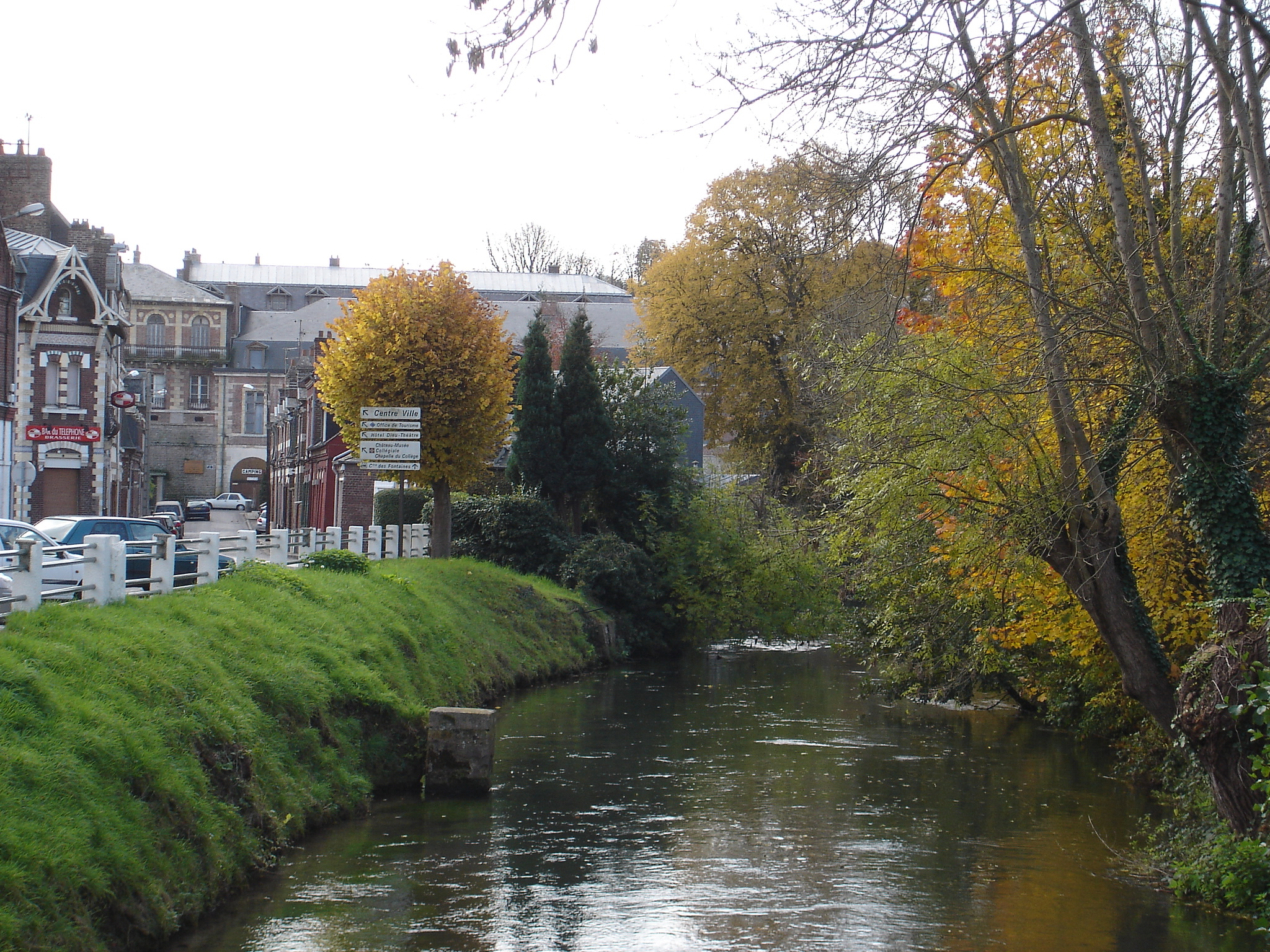
The Bresle at Eu

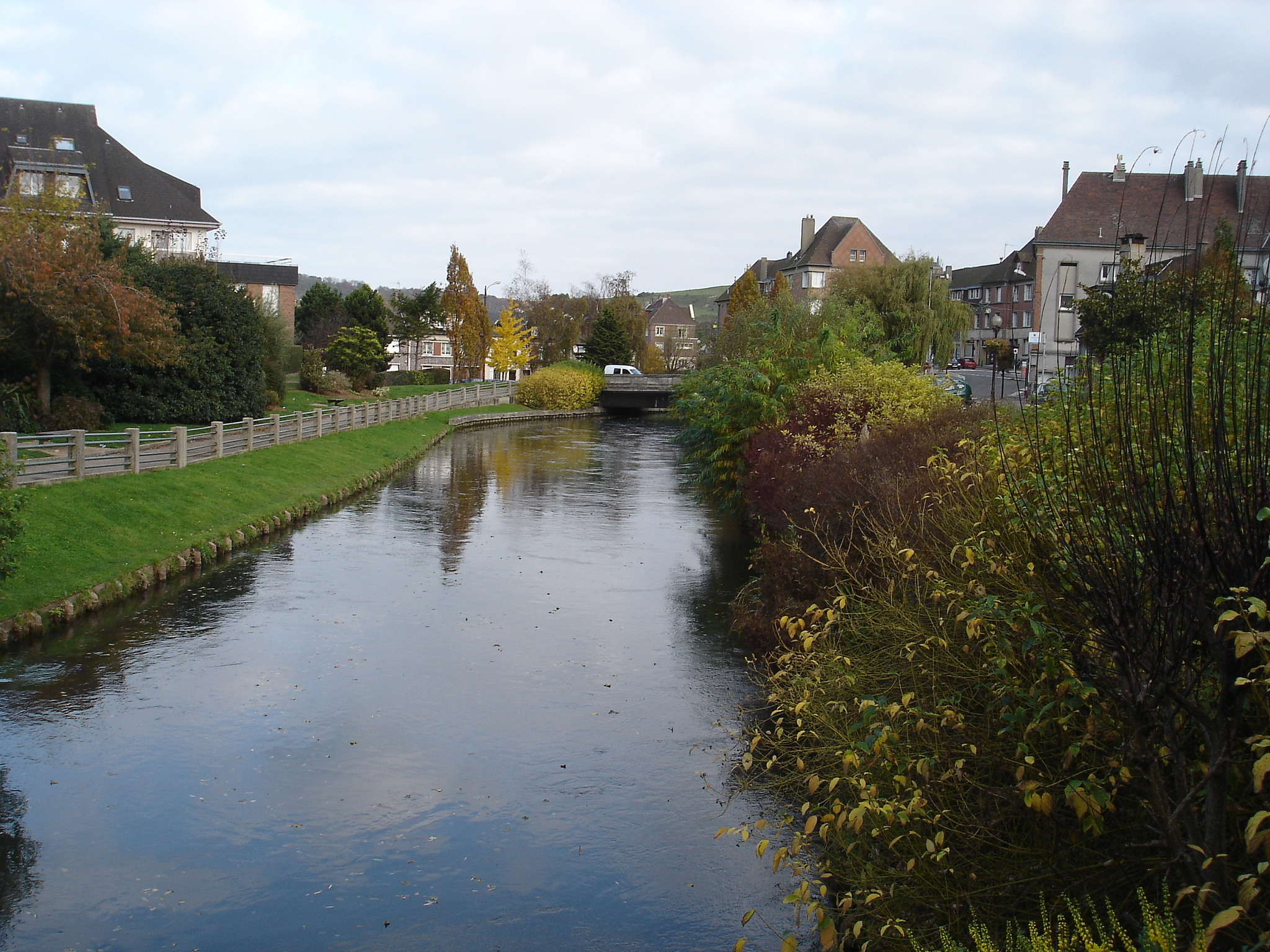
The Bresle at Eu

== Flora and fauna ==
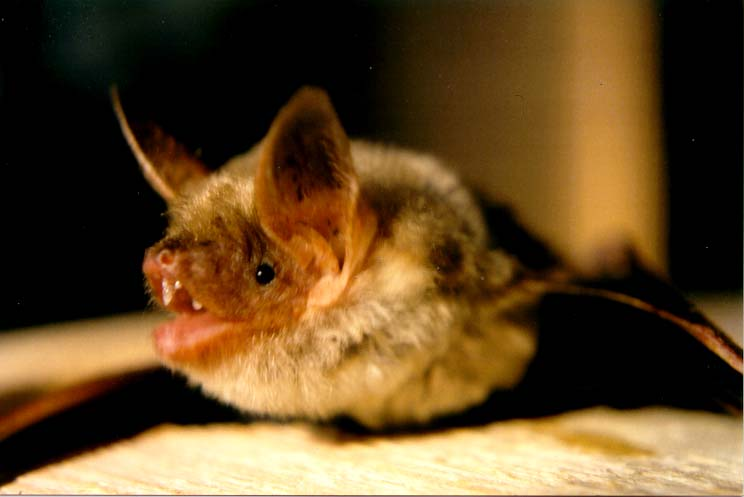
Greater mouse-eared bat (Myotis myotis)

The valley has a huge range of plants varying from orchids, sedges, bracken and cranberry to trees such as juniper and beech (notably asperulo-fagetum).
Common animals in the upper valley include the wild boar, red deer and wild cat, but it is also home to rarer creatures, four types of bat and four kinds of damselfly, including the Coenagrion mercuriale, not found anywhere else in France.
Many wildfowl winter in the valley, such as the little grebe, the great crested grebe and coots.

== Angling ==
The Bresle is home to a variety of fish, from sea-trout in the lower valley and brown trout upstream, to carp, pike, roach, and bream in both the lakes and the river.

== Places of interest ==
Museums devoted to the glass industry are open to the public at Eu (musée "Traditions verrières") and at Blangy-sur-Bresle (at the manoir de Fontaine). They show the history of glass and bottle-making, the different stages of the process (from the base materials through to packaging), the tools and modern machines, the collections of perfume bottles and demonstrations of glass-blowing by experts.

The signposted Chemin des étangs (eng:the lakes path) allows walkers and cyclists to roam the lower part of the valley, between Eu and Incheville.
Many aquatic activities (sailing, canoeing etc.) can be enjoyed on the hundreds of lakes formed by the river.

== Bibliography ==
- J.-C. Lecat, La région industrielle de la Bresle, Études normandes, n°222, 3^{e} trimestre 1969.
- Jacques Hétru, Le verre: l’art et la matière, Éd. Bertout, Luneray, 1996 ISBN 2-86743-264-2
- Philippe Gillet, Pochet Le Courval, Les maîtres du verre et du feu : quatre siècles d’excellence, Perrin, Paris, 1998 ISBN 978-2262013424
- Albert Hennetier, Aux sources normandes: Promenade au fil des rivières en Seine-Maritime, Éd. Bertout, Luneray, 2006 ISBN 978-2867436239
- J.-L. Mériaux, J. Duvigneaud, J.-R. Wattez, M. Coste et F. Sueur, Étude inter-agences. Connaissance et fonctionnement des milieux aquatiques. Relevés floristiques. Déterminations taxonomiques et physico-chimie sur 12 cours d’eau français. Application aux rivières Aa et Bresle. Agence Eau Seine-Normandie, AMBE, 1995, 72 p.
- J.-L. Mériaux, J. Duvigneaud, J.-R. Wattez, M. Coste et F. Sueur, Étude inter-agences. Connaissance et fonctionnement des milieux aquatiques. Relevés floristiques. Déterminations taxonomiques et physico-chimie sur 12 cours d’eau français. Fichier Bresle. Agence Eau Seine-Normandie, AMBE, 1995, 579 p.
