= Ricquebourg =

- Commune
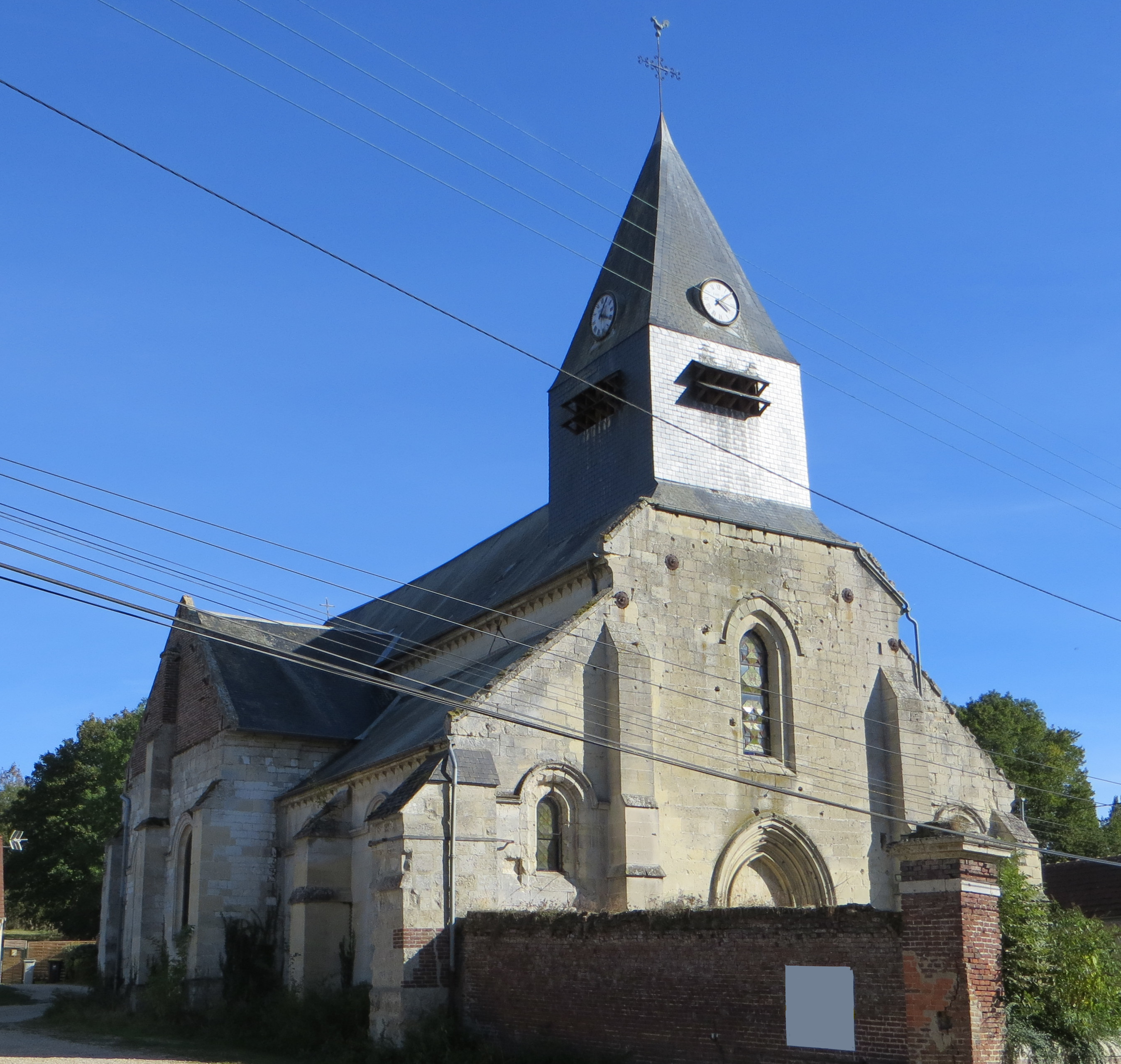
- The church in Ricquebourg
- Location of Ricquebourg
- Location within France Location within Hauts-de-France
- Coordinates: 49°33′29″N 2°45′30″E
- Country: France
- Region: Hauts-de-France
- Department: Oise
- Arrondissement: Compiègne
- Canton: Estrées-Saint-Denis
- Intercommunality: Pays des Sources

Government
  - Mayor (2020–2026): Alain Vincent
- Area^{1}: 5.09 km^{2} (1.97 sq mi)
- Elevation: 76 m (249 ft)
- Highest elevation: 169 m (554 ft)
- Lowest elevation: 56 m (184 ft)
- Population (2023): 298
  - Density: 58.5/km^{2} (152/sq mi)
- Time zone: UTC+01:00 (CET)
  - Summer (DST): UTC+02:00 (CEST)
- INSEE/Postal code: 60538 /60490
- ^{1} French Land Register data, which excludes lakes, ponds, glaciers > 1 km^{2} (0.386 sq mi or 247 acres) and river estuaries.

Ricquebourg (French pronunciation: [ʁikbuʁ]) is a commune in the Oise department in northern France.

== See also ==
- Communes of the Oise department
