= Welles-Pérennes =

- Commune
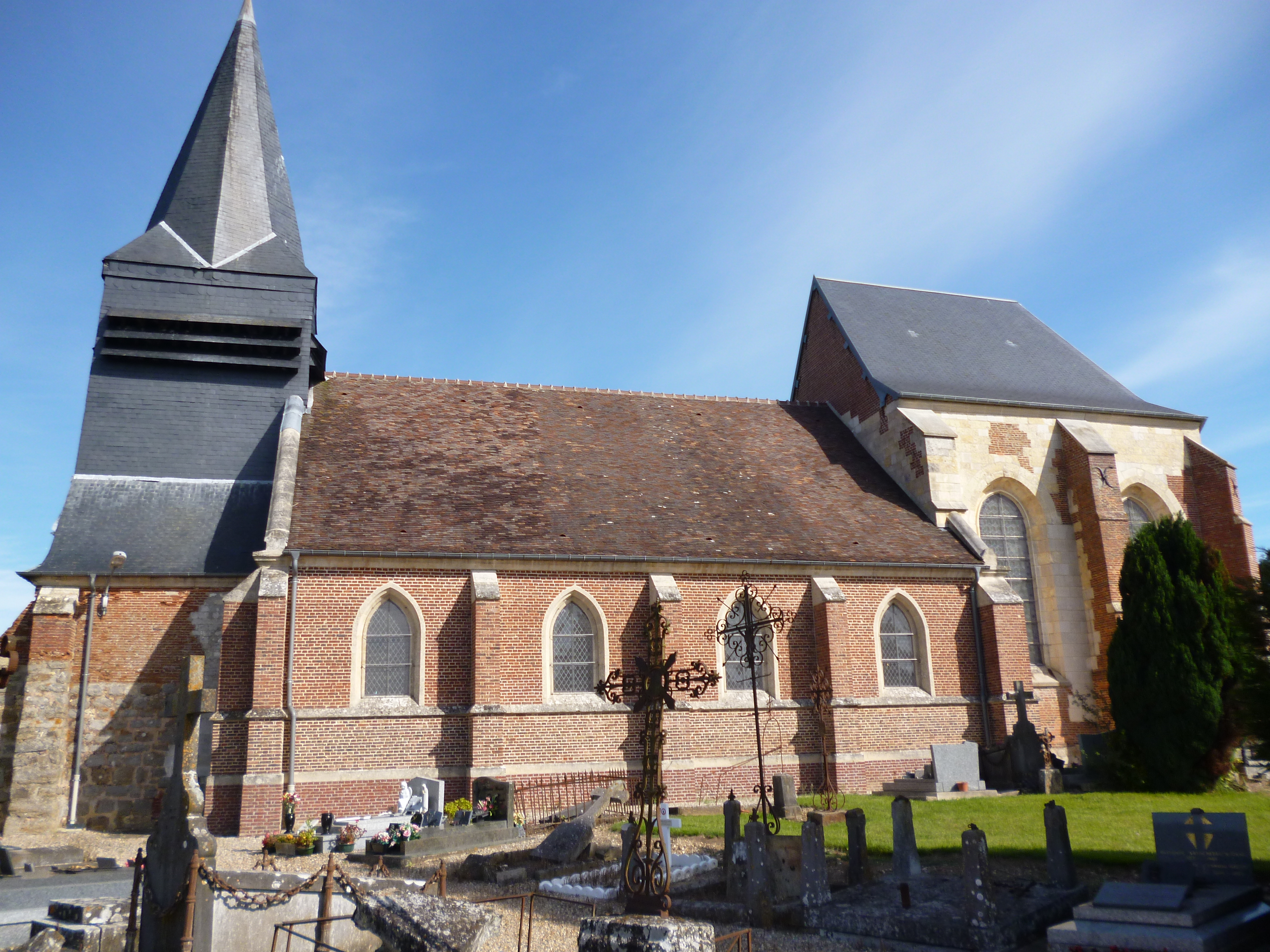
- The church in Welles
- Location of Welles-Pérennes
- Location within France Location within Hauts-de-France
- Coordinates: 49°36′32″N 2°29′02″E
- Country: France
- Region: Hauts-de-France
- Department: Oise
- Arrondissement: Clermont
- Canton: Estrées-Saint-Denis
- Intercommunality: Plateau Picard

Government
  - Mayor (2020–2026): Régis Bizet
- Area^{1}: 13.41 km^{2} (5.18 sq mi)
- Elevation: 113 m (371 ft)
- Highest elevation: 146 m (479 ft)
- Lowest elevation: 74 m (243 ft)
- Population (2023): 233
  - Density: 17.4/km^{2} (45.0/sq mi)
- Time zone: UTC+01:00 (CET)
  - Summer (DST): UTC+02:00 (CEST)
- INSEE/Postal code: 60702 /60420
- ^{1} French Land Register data, which excludes lakes, ponds, glaciers > 1 km^{2} (0.386 sq mi or 247 acres) and river estuaries.

Welles-Pérennes (French pronunciation: [wɛl peʁɛn]) is a commune in the Oise department in northern France.

== Population ==
Historical population
Year	Pop.	±% p.a.
1968	217	—
1975	203	−0.95%
1982	178	−1.86%
1990	201	+1.53%
1999	222	+1.11%
2007	238	+0.87%
2012	251	+1.07%
2017	255	+0.32%
2023	233	−1.49%
Source: INSEE

== See also ==
- Communes of the Oise department
