= Pronleroy =

- Commune
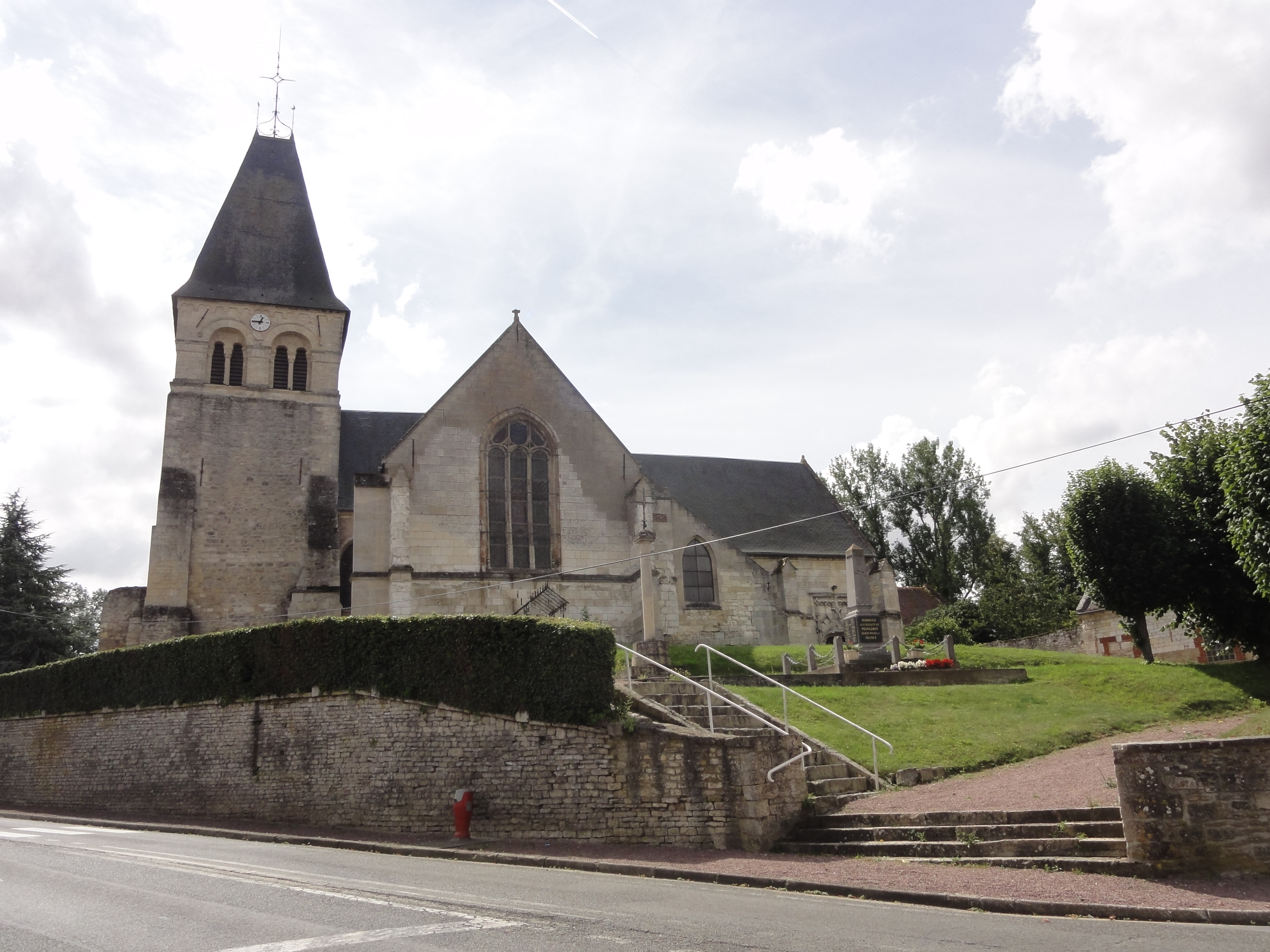
- The church in Pronleroy
- Location of Pronleroy
- Location within France Location within Hauts-de-France
- Coordinates: 49°28′17″N 2°32′58″E
- Country: France
- Region: Hauts-de-France
- Department: Oise
- Arrondissement: Clermont
- Canton: Estrées-Saint-Denis
- Intercommunality: Plateau Picard

Government
  - Mayor (2020–2026): Bruno Rabussier
- Area^{1}: 8.97 km^{2} (3.46 sq mi)
- Elevation: 119 m (390 ft)
- Highest elevation: 130 m (430 ft)
- Lowest elevation: 76 m (249 ft)
- Population (2023): 365
  - Density: 40.7/km^{2} (105/sq mi)
- Time zone: UTC+01:00 (CET)
  - Summer (DST): UTC+02:00 (CEST)
- INSEE/Postal code: 60515 /60190
- ^{1} French Land Register data, which excludes lakes, ponds, glaciers > 1 km^{2} (0.386 sq mi or 247 acres) and river estuaries.

Pronleroy (French pronunciation: [pʁɔ̃ləʁwa]) is a commune in the Oise department in northern France.

== See also ==
- Communes of the Oise department
