= Coudun =

- Commune
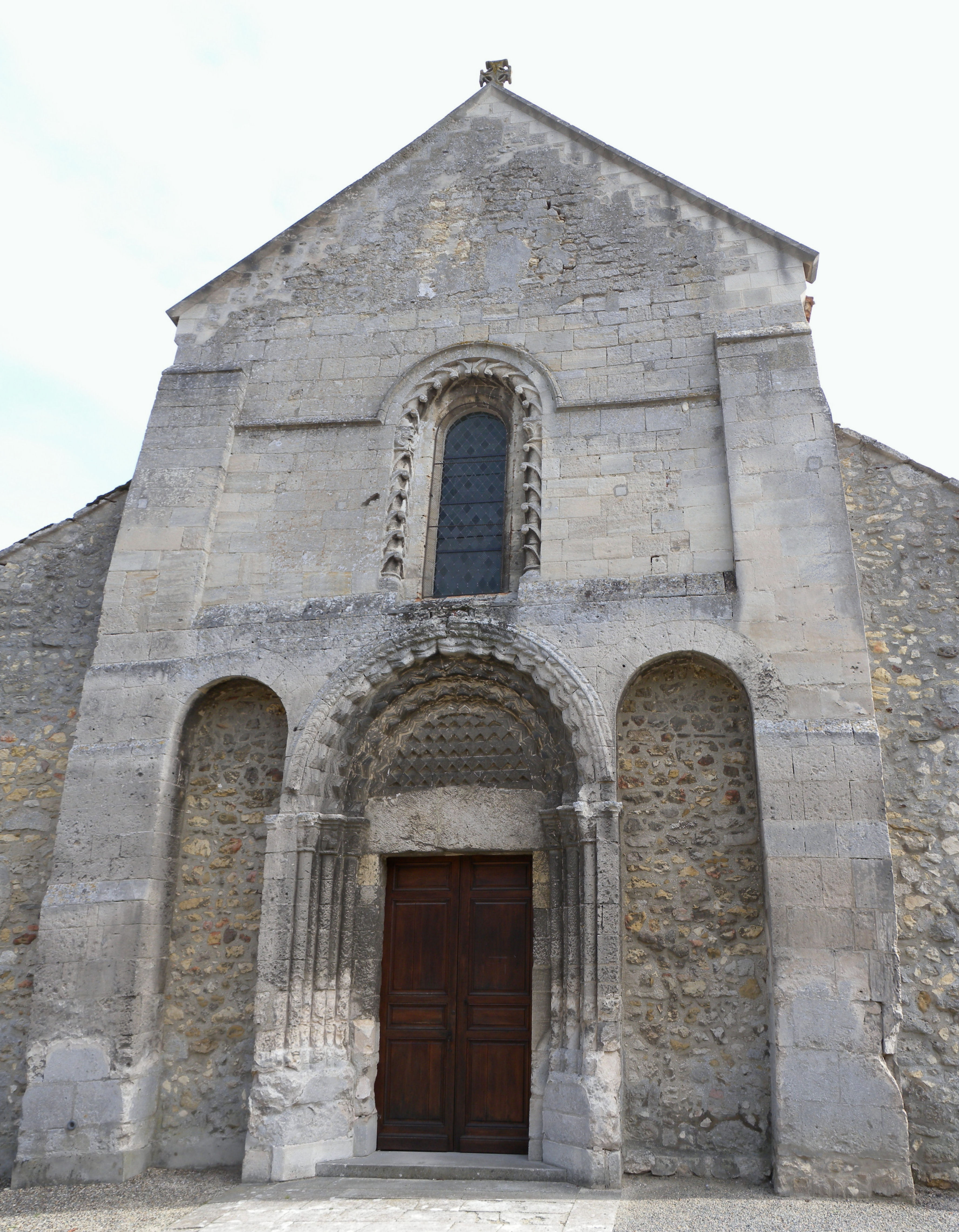
- The church in Coudun
- Location of Coudun
- Location within France Location within Hauts-de-France
- Coordinates: 49°27′42″N 2°48′55″E
- Country: France
- Region: Hauts-de-France
- Department: Oise
- Arrondissement: Compiègne
- Canton: Estrées-Saint-Denis
- Intercommunality: Pays des Sources

Government
  - Mayor (2023–2026): Sandrine Auribault
- Area^{1}: 10.4 km^{2} (4.0 sq mi)
- Elevation: 51 m (167 ft)
- Highest elevation: 149 m (489 ft)
- Lowest elevation: 37 m (121 ft)
- Population (2023): 1,050
  - Density: 101/km^{2} (261/sq mi)
- Time zone: UTC+01:00 (CET)
  - Summer (DST): UTC+02:00 (CEST)
- INSEE/Postal code: 60166 /60150
- ^{1} French Land Register data, which excludes lakes, ponds, glaciers > 1 km^{2} (0.386 sq mi or 247 acres) and river estuaries.

Coudun (French pronunciation: [kudœ̃]) is a commune in the Oise department in northern France.

== See also ==
- Communes of the Oise department
