= Hainvillers =

- Commune
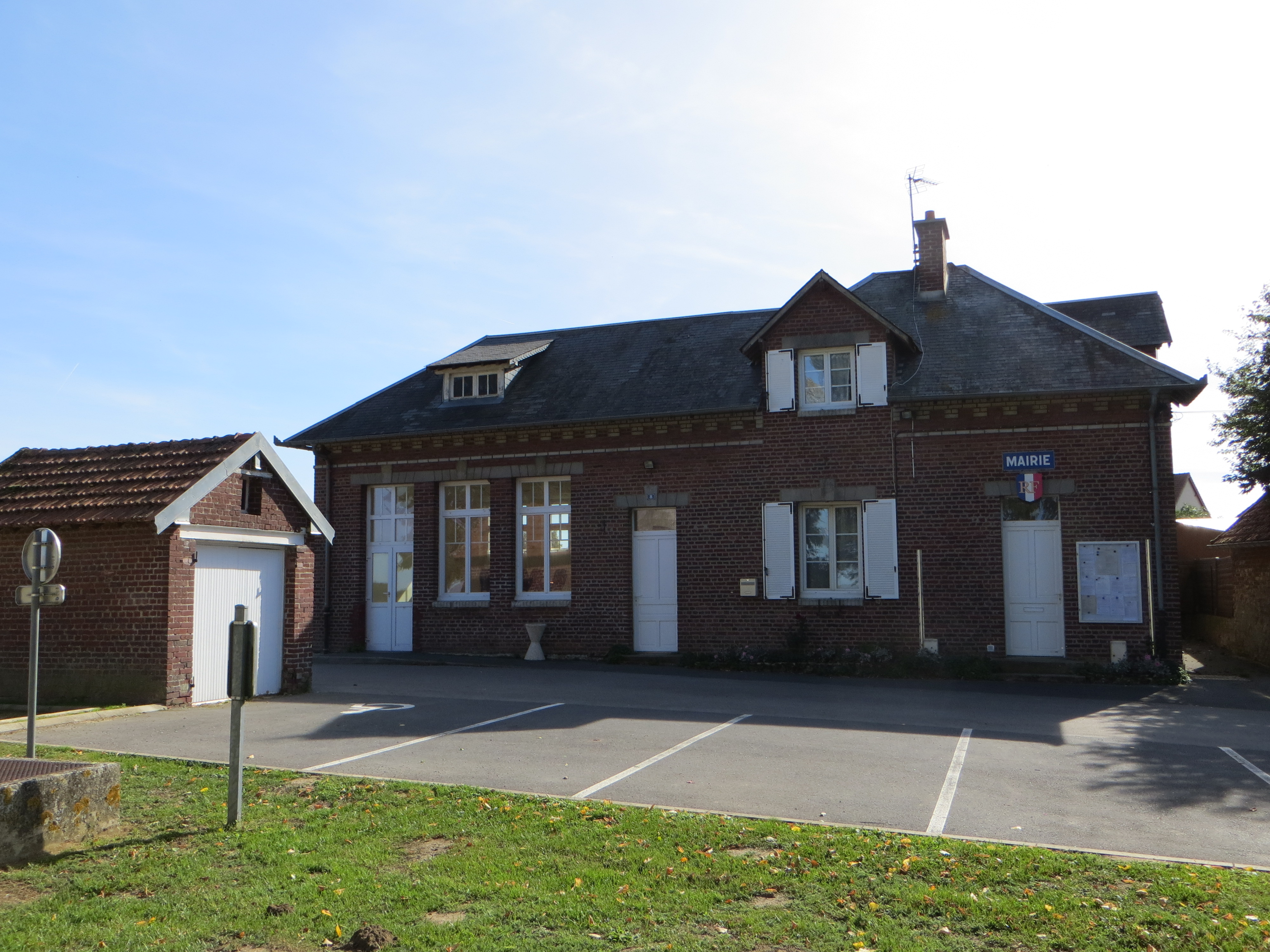
- Hainvillers Town hall
- Location of Hainvillers
- Location within France Location within Hauts-de-France
- Coordinates: 49°35′36″N 2°41′04″E
- Country: France
- Region: Hauts-de-France
- Department: Oise
- Arrondissement: Compiègne
- Canton: Estrées-Saint-Denis
- Intercommunality: Pays des Sources

Government
  - Mayor (2020–2026): Yves Flon
- Area^{1}: 2.96 km^{2} (1.14 sq mi)
- Elevation: 120 m (390 ft)
- Highest elevation: 123 m (404 ft)
- Lowest elevation: 88 m (289 ft)
- Population (2023): 82
  - Density: 28/km^{2} (72/sq mi)
- Time zone: UTC+01:00 (CET)
  - Summer (DST): UTC+02:00 (CEST)
- INSEE/Postal code: 60294 /60490
- ^{1} French Land Register data, which excludes lakes, ponds, glaciers > 1 km^{2} (0.386 sq mi or 247 acres) and river estuaries.

Hainvillers is a commune in the Oise department in northern France.

== See also ==
- Communes of the Oise department
