= Neufvy-sur-Aronde =

- Commune
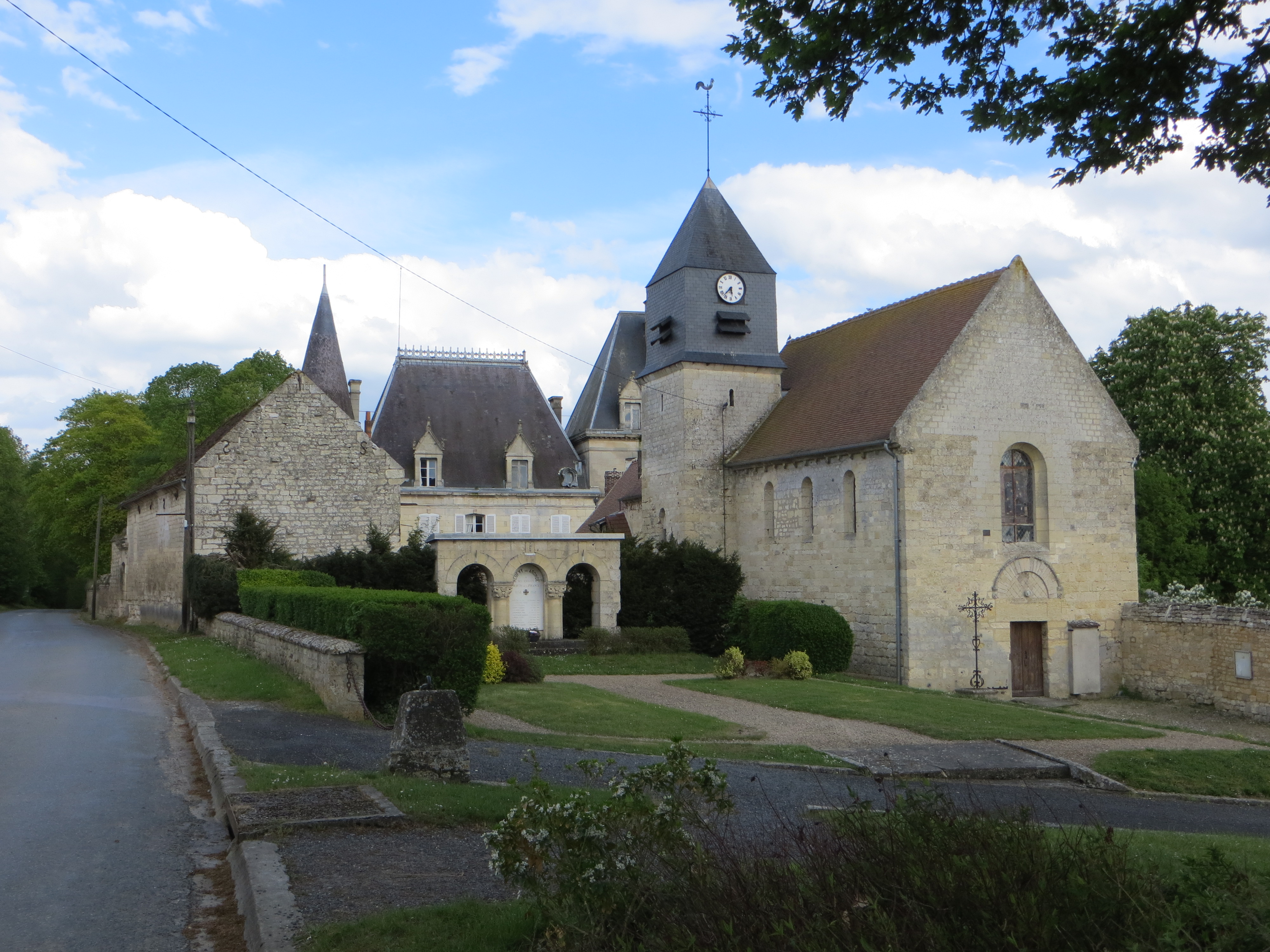
- The church and chateau in Neufvy-sur-Aronde
- Location of Neufvy-sur-Aronde
- Location within France Location within Hauts-de-France
- Coordinates: 49°29′49″N 2°39′45″E
- Country: France
- Region: Hauts-de-France
- Department: Oise
- Arrondissement: Compiègne
- Canton: Estrées-Saint-Denis
- Intercommunality: Pays des Sources

Government
  - Mayor (2020–2026): Marc d'Arrentieres
- Area^{1}: 7.31 km^{2} (2.82 sq mi)
- Elevation: 80 m (260 ft)
- Highest elevation: 131 m (430 ft)
- Lowest elevation: 52 m (171 ft)
- Population (2023): 280
  - Density: 38/km^{2} (99/sq mi)
- Time zone: UTC+01:00 (CET)
  - Summer (DST): UTC+02:00 (CEST)
- INSEE/Postal code: 60449 /60190
- ^{1} French Land Register data, which excludes lakes, ponds, glaciers > 1 km^{2} (0.386 sq mi or 247 acres) and river estuaries.

Neufvy-sur-Aronde (French pronunciation: [nøvi syʁ aʁɔ̃d]) is a commune in the Oise department in northern France.

== See also ==
- Communes of the Oise department
