= Épineuse =

- Commune
- Coat of arms
- Location of Épineuse
- Location within France Location within Hauts-de-France
- Coordinates: 49°23′52″N 2°33′18″E
- Country: France
- Region: Hauts-de-France
- Department: Oise
- Arrondissement: Clermont
- Canton: Estrées-Saint-Denis
- Intercommunality: Plaine d'Estrées

Government
  - Mayor (2020–2026): Christophe Yssembourg
- Area^{1}: 7.12 km^{2} (2.75 sq mi)
- Elevation: 118 m (387 ft)
- Highest elevation: 142 m (466 ft)
- Lowest elevation: 81 m (266 ft)
- Population (2023): 281
  - Density: 39.5/km^{2} (102/sq mi)
- Time zone: UTC+01:00 (CET)
  - Summer (DST): UTC+02:00 (CEST)
- INSEE/Postal code: 60210 /60190
- ^{1} French Land Register data, which excludes lakes, ponds, glaciers > 1 km^{2} (0.386 sq mi or 247 acres) and river estuaries.

Épineuse (French pronunciation: [epinøz]) is a commune in the Oise department in northern France.

== See also ==
- Communes of the Oise department
