= Coivrel =

- Commune
- Location of Coivrel
- Location within France Location within Hauts-de-France
- Coordinates: 49°33′12″N 2°33′28″E
- Country: France
- Region: Hauts-de-France
- Department: Oise
- Arrondissement: Clermont
- Canton: Estrées-Saint-Denis
- Intercommunality: Plateau Picard

Government
  - Mayor (2020–2026): Aline Larue
- Area^{1}: 6.11 km^{2} (2.36 sq mi)
- Elevation: 142 m (466 ft)
- Highest elevation: 150 m (490 ft)
- Lowest elevation: 95 m (312 ft)
- Population (2023): 249
  - Density: 40.8/km^{2} (106/sq mi)
- Time zone: UTC+01:00 (CET)
  - Summer (DST): UTC+02:00 (CEST)
- INSEE/Postal code: 60158 /60420
- ^{1} French Land Register data, which excludes lakes, ponds, glaciers > 1 km^{2} (0.386 sq mi or 247 acres) and river estuaries.

Coivrel (French pronunciation: [kwavʁɛl]) is a commune in the Oise department in northern France.

== See also ==
- Communes of the Oise department
