= Antheuil-Portes =

- Commune
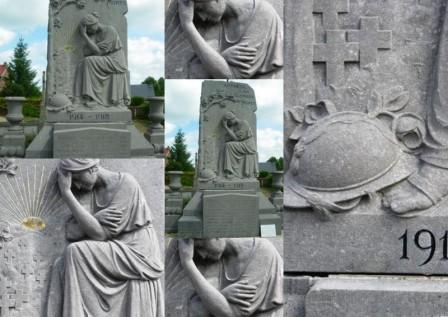
- The war memorial in Antheuil-Portes
- Location of Antheuil-Portes
- Location within France Location within Hauts-de-France
- Coordinates: 49°29′47″N 2°45′20″E
- Country: France
- Region: Hauts-de-France
- Department: Oise
- Arrondissement: Compiègne
- Canton: Estrées-Saint-Denis
- Intercommunality: Pays des Sources

Government
  - Mayor (2020–2026): Antoine Bibaut
- Area^{1}: 10.73 km^{2} (4.14 sq mi)
- Elevation: 87 m (285 ft)
- Highest elevation: 118 m (387 ft)
- Lowest elevation: 60 m (200 ft)
- Population (2023): 408
  - Density: 38.0/km^{2} (98.5/sq mi)
- Time zone: UTC+01:00 (CET)
  - Summer (DST): UTC+02:00 (CEST)
- INSEE/Postal code: 60019 /60162
- ^{1} French Land Register data, which excludes lakes, ponds, glaciers > 1 km^{2} (0.386 sq mi or 247 acres) and river estuaries.

Antheuil-Portes (French pronunciation: [ɑ̃tœj pɔʁt]) is a commune in the Oise department in northern France.

== Population ==
Historical population
Year	Pop.	±% p.a.
1968	270	—
1975	246	−1.32%
1982	290	+2.38%
1990	386	+3.64%
1999	416	+0.84%
2007	427	+0.33%
2012	419	−0.38%
2017	409	−0.48%
2023	408	−0.04%
Source: INSEE

== See also ==
- Communes of the Oise department
