= Grandvillers-aux-Bois =

- Commune
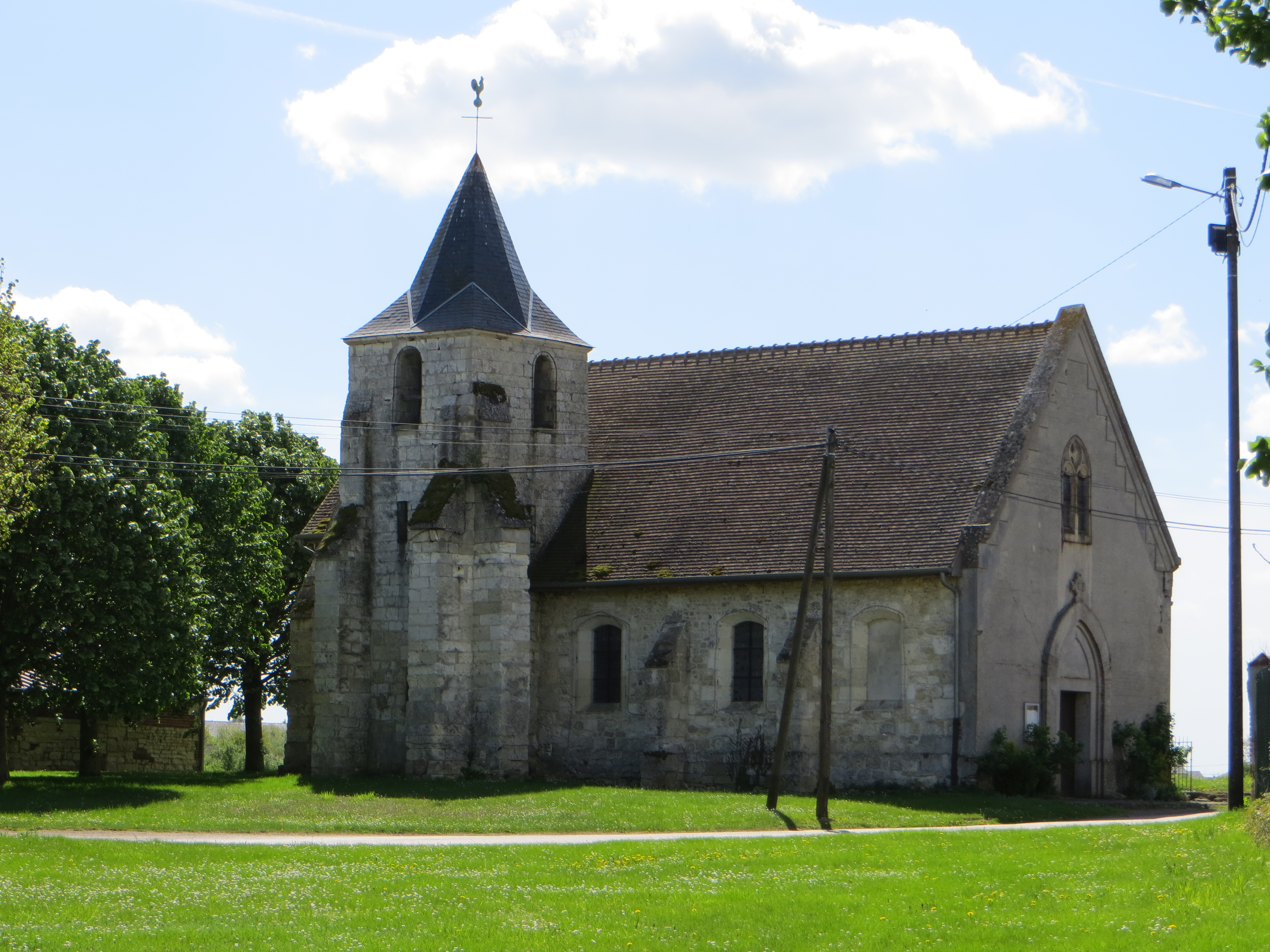
- The church in Grandvillers-aux-Bois
- Location of Grandvillers-aux-Bois
- Location within France Location within Hauts-de-France
- Coordinates: 49°27′27″N 2°36′20″E
- Country: France
- Region: Hauts-de-France
- Department: Oise
- Arrondissement: Clermont
- Canton: Estrées-Saint-Denis
- Intercommunality: Plateau Picard

Government
  - Mayor (2020–2026): Bertrand Candelot
- Area^{1}: 6.63 km^{2} (2.56 sq mi)
- Elevation: 82 m (269 ft)
- Highest elevation: 99 m (325 ft)
- Lowest elevation: 63 m (207 ft)
- Population (2023): 297
  - Density: 44.8/km^{2} (116/sq mi)
- Time zone: UTC+01:00 (CET)
  - Summer (DST): UTC+02:00 (CEST)
- INSEE/Postal code: 60285 /60190
- ^{1} French Land Register data, which excludes lakes, ponds, glaciers > 1 km^{2} (0.386 sq mi or 247 acres) and river estuaries.

Grandvillers-aux-Bois is a commune in the Oise department in northern France.

== See also ==
- Communes of the Oise department
