= Dompierre, Oise =

Dompierre
- Commune
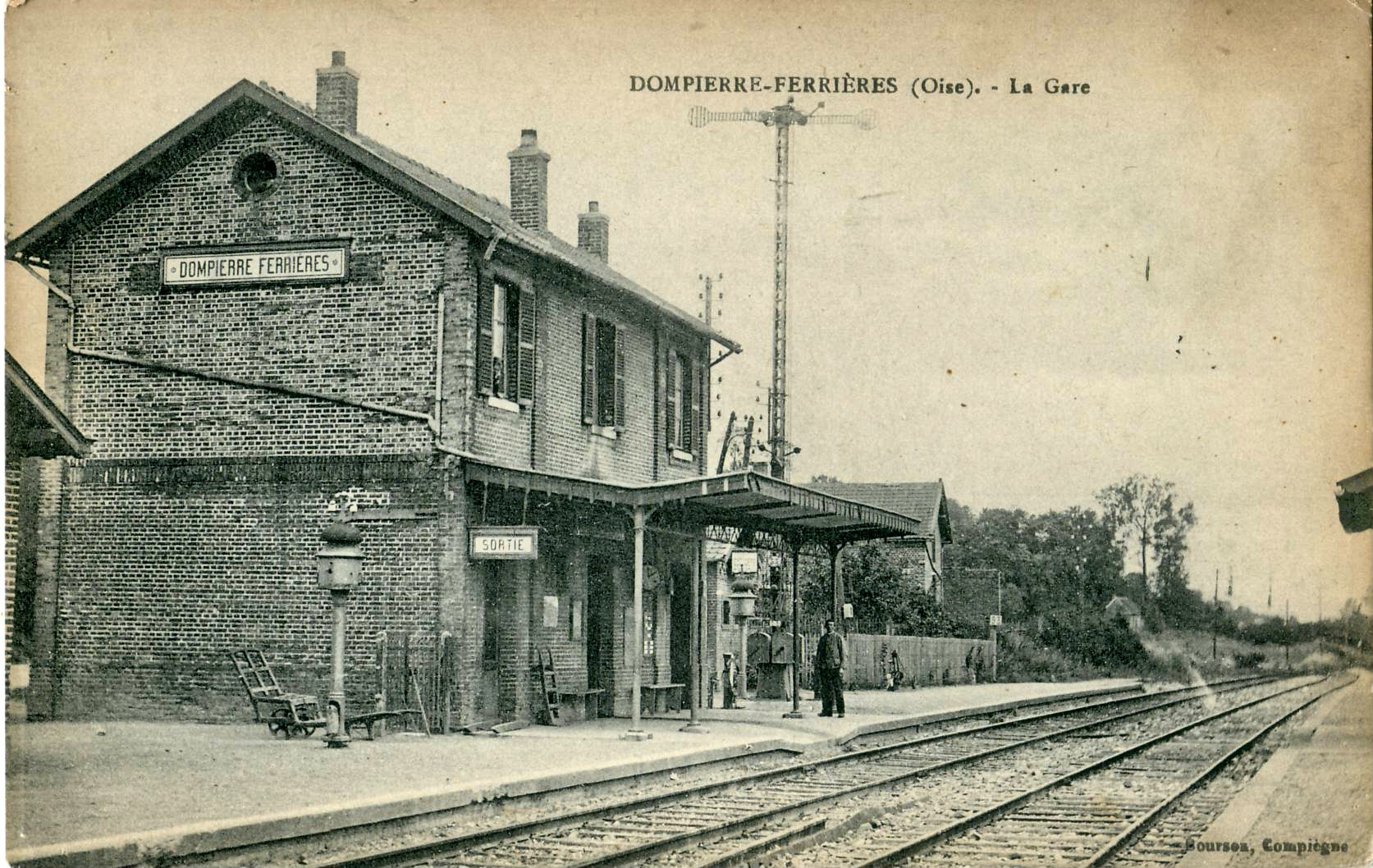
- The railway station in Dompierre

- Coat of arms
- Location of Dompierre
- Location within France Location within Hauts-de-France
- Coordinates: 49°35′43″N 2°32′11″E
- Country: France
- Region: Hauts-de-France
- Department: Oise
- Arrondissement: Clermont
- Canton: Estrées-Saint-Denis
- Intercommunality: Plateau Picard

Government
  - Mayor (2020–2026): Véronique Grignon-Ponce
- Area^{1}: 2.73 km^{2} (1.05 sq mi)
- Elevation: 101 m (331 ft)
- Highest elevation: 119 m (390 ft)
- Lowest elevation: 77 m (253 ft)
- Population (2023): 248
  - Density: 90.8/km^{2} (235/sq mi)
- Time zone: UTC+01:00 (CET)
  - Summer (DST): UTC+02:00 (CEST)
- INSEE/Postal code: 60201 /60420
- ^{1} French Land Register data, which excludes lakes, ponds, glaciers > 1 km^{2} (0.386 sq mi or 247 acres) and river estuaries.

Dompierre (French pronunciation: [dɔ̃pjɛʁ]) is a commune in the Oise department in northern France.

== See also ==
- Communes of the Oise department
