= Mortemer, Oise =

Mortemer
- Commune
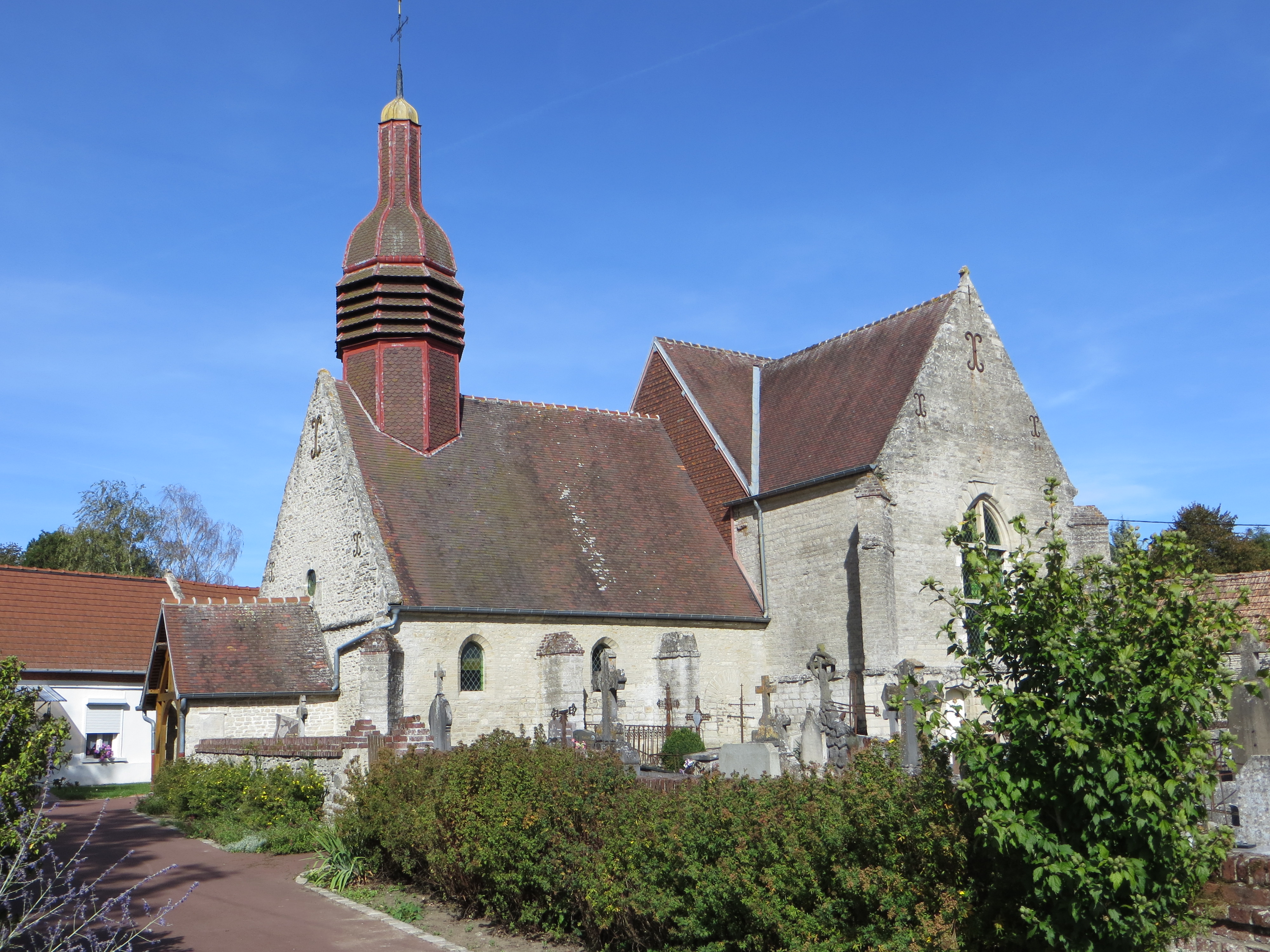
- The church in Mortemer
- Location of Mortemer
- Location within France Location within Hauts-de-France
- Coordinates: 49°34′16″N 2°40′37″E
- Country: France
- Region: Hauts-de-France
- Department: Oise
- Arrondissement: Compiègne
- Canton: Estrées-Saint-Denis
- Intercommunality: Pays des Sources

Government
  - Mayor (2020–2026): Guillaume Tribout
- Area^{1}: 6.56 km^{2} (2.53 sq mi)
- Elevation: 103 m (338 ft)
- Highest elevation: 108 m (354 ft)
- Lowest elevation: 78 m (256 ft)
- Population (2023): 220
  - Density: 34/km^{2} (87/sq mi)
- Time zone: UTC+01:00 (CET)
  - Summer (DST): UTC+02:00 (CEST)
- INSEE/Postal code: 60434 /60490
- ^{1} French Land Register data, which excludes lakes, ponds, glaciers > 1 km^{2} (0.386 sq mi or 247 acres) and river estuaries.

Mortemer is a commune in the Oise department in northern France.

== See also ==
- Communes of the Oise department
