= Le Ployron =

- Commune
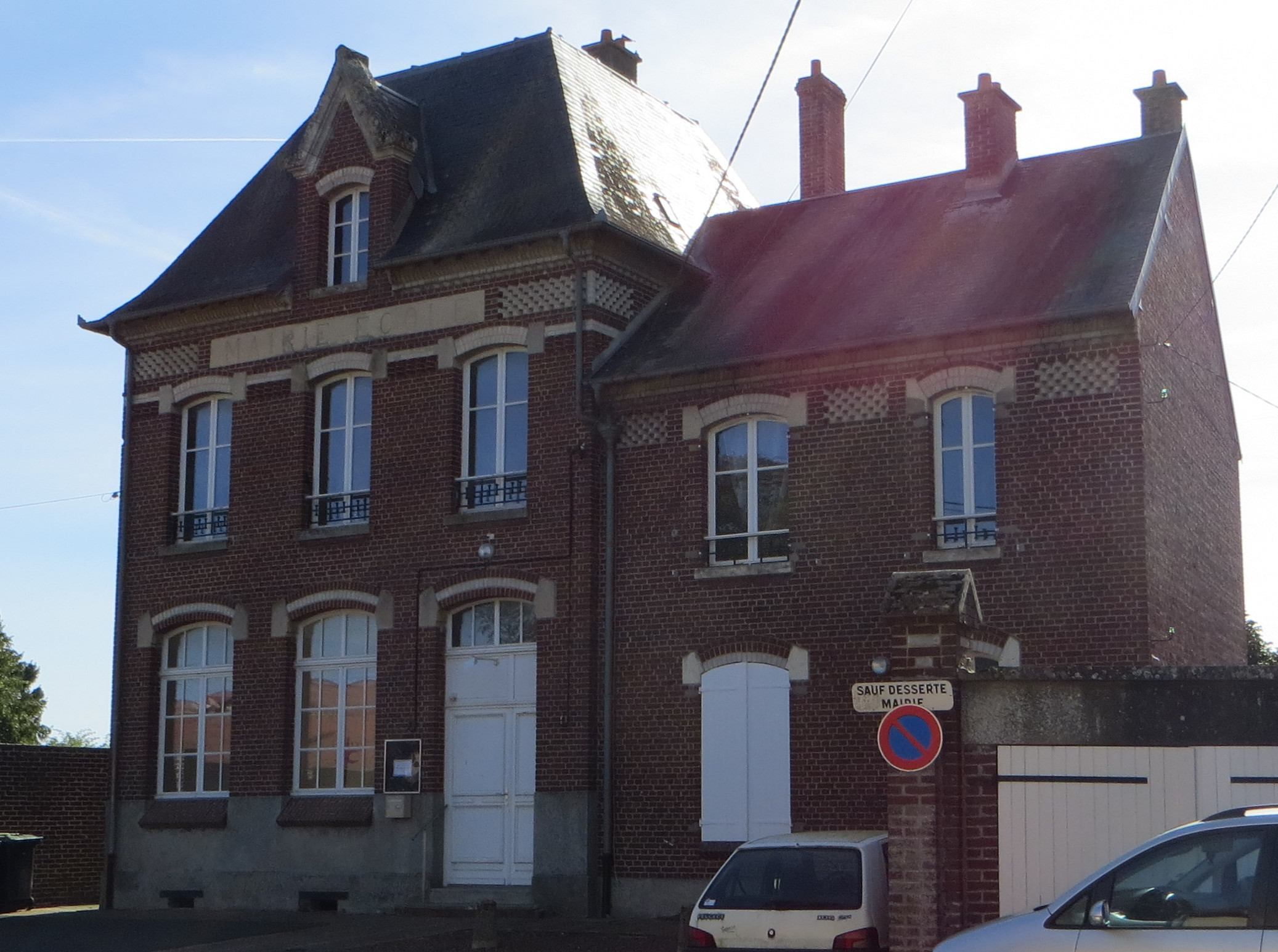
- The town hall in Le Ployron
- Location of Le Ployron
- Location within France Location within Hauts-de-France
- Coordinates: 49°35′10″N 2°35′06″E
- Country: France
- Region: Hauts-de-France
- Department: Oise
- Arrondissement: Clermont
- Canton: Estrées-Saint-Denis
- Intercommunality: Plateau Picard

Government
  - Mayor (2020–2026): Régis Grevin
- Area^{1}: 4.18 km^{2} (1.61 sq mi)
- Elevation: 91 m (299 ft)
- Highest elevation: 97 m (318 ft)
- Lowest elevation: 87 m (285 ft)
- Population (2023): 112
  - Density: 26.8/km^{2} (69.4/sq mi)
- Time zone: UTC+01:00 (CET)
  - Summer (DST): UTC+02:00 (CEST)
- INSEE/Postal code: 60503 /60420
- ^{1} French Land Register data, which excludes lakes, ponds, glaciers > 1 km^{2} (0.386 sq mi or 247 acres) and river estuaries.

Le Ployron (French pronunciation: [lə plwaʁɔ̃]) is a commune in the Oise department in northern France.

== See also ==
- Communes of the Oise department
