= Montmartin =

- Commune
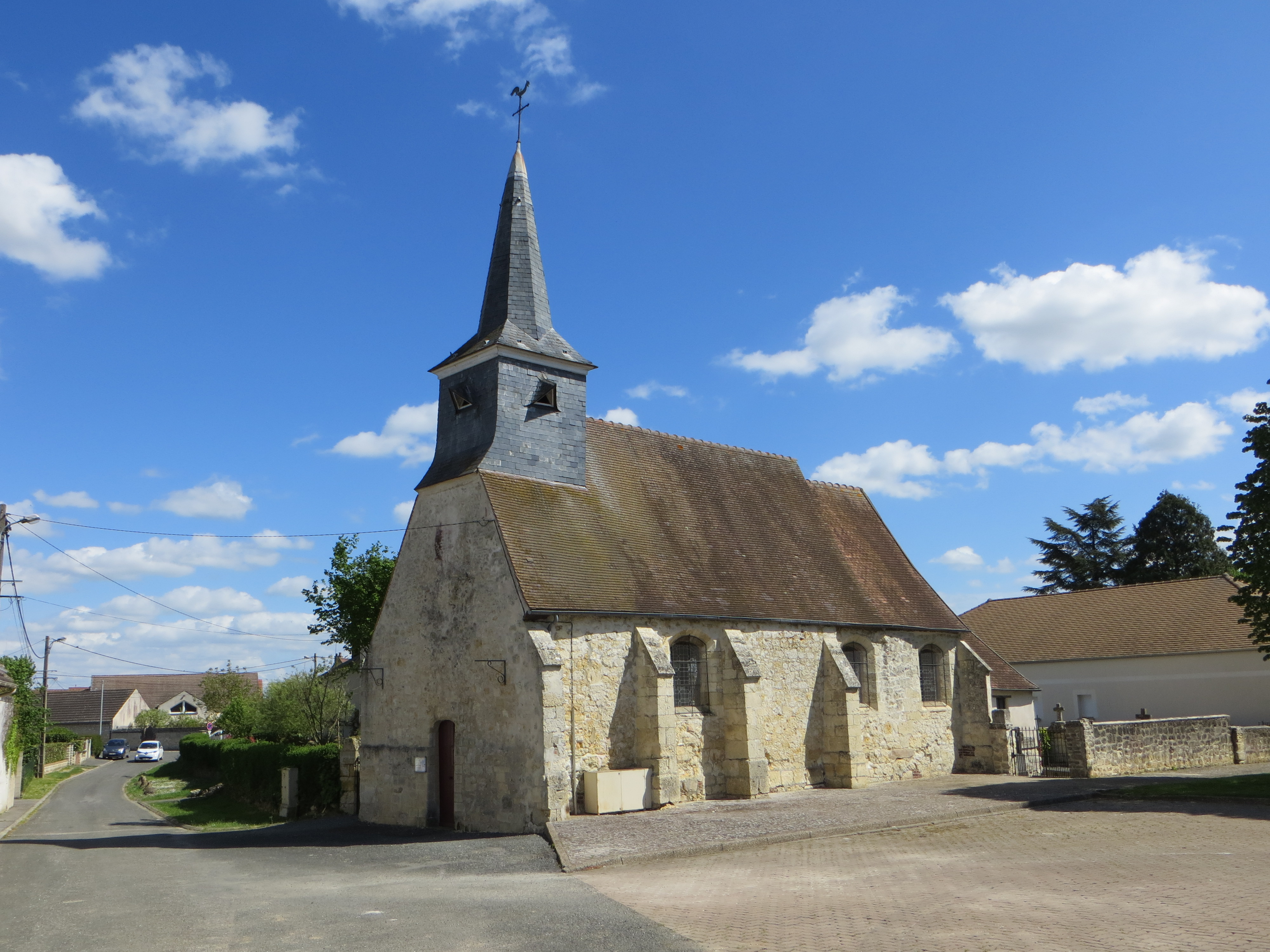
- The church in Montmartin
- Location of Montmartin
- Location within France Location within Hauts-de-France
- Coordinates: 49°27′52″N 2°41′40″E
- Country: France
- Region: Hauts-de-France
- Department: Oise
- Arrondissement: Compiègne
- Canton: Estrées-Saint-Denis
- Intercommunality: Plaine d'Estrées

Government
  - Mayor (2020–2026): Patrick Grévin
- Area^{1}: 3.33 km^{2} (1.29 sq mi)
- Elevation: 80 m (260 ft)
- Highest elevation: 97 m (318 ft)
- Lowest elevation: 47 m (154 ft)
- Population (2023): 294
  - Density: 88.3/km^{2} (229/sq mi)
- Time zone: UTC+01:00 (CET)
  - Summer (DST): UTC+02:00 (CEST)
- INSEE/Postal code: 60424 /60190
- ^{1} French Land Register data, which excludes lakes, ponds, glaciers > 1 km^{2} (0.386 sq mi or 247 acres) and river estuaries.

Montmartin (French pronunciation: [mɔ̃maʁtɛ̃]) is a commune in the Oise department in northern France.

== See also ==
- Communes of the Oise department
