= Blincourt =

- Commune
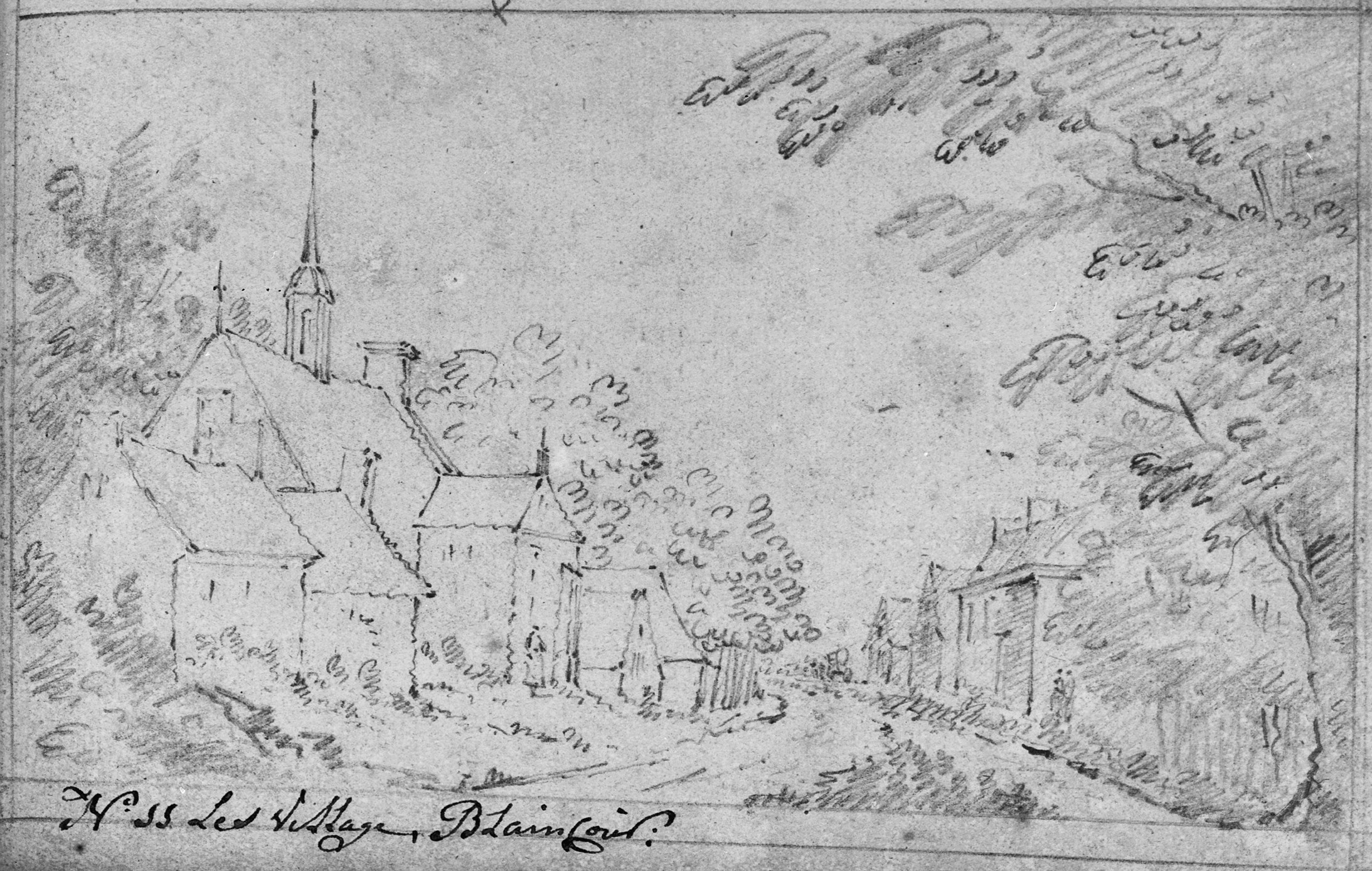
- A representation of the church in Blincourt
- Location of Blincourt
- Location within France Location within Hauts-de-France
- Coordinates: 49°23′03″N 2°37′10″E
- Country: France
- Region: Hauts-de-France
- Department: Oise
- Arrondissement: Clermont
- Canton: Estrées-Saint-Denis
- Intercommunality: Plaine d'Estrées

Government
  - Mayor (2020–2026): Dominique Le Sourd
- Area^{1}: 2.82 km^{2} (1.09 sq mi)
- Elevation: 88 m (289 ft)
- Highest elevation: 98 m (322 ft)
- Lowest elevation: 69 m (226 ft)
- Population (2023): 125
  - Density: 44.3/km^{2} (115/sq mi)
- Time zone: UTC+01:00 (CET)
  - Summer (DST): UTC+02:00 (CEST)
- INSEE/Postal code: 60078 /60190
- ^{1} French Land Register data, which excludes lakes, ponds, glaciers > 1 km^{2} (0.386 sq mi or 247 acres) and river estuaries.

Blincourt (French pronunciation: [blɛ̃kuʁ]) is a commune in the Oise department in northern France.

== Population ==
Historical population
Year	Pop.	±% p.a.
1968	78	—
1975	73	−0.94%
1982	65	−1.64%
1990	45	−4.49%
1999	76	+6.00%
2007	105	+4.12%
2012	116	+2.01%
2017	93	−4.32%
2023	125	+5.05%
Source: INSEE

== See also ==
- Communes of the Oise department
