= Canly =

- Commune
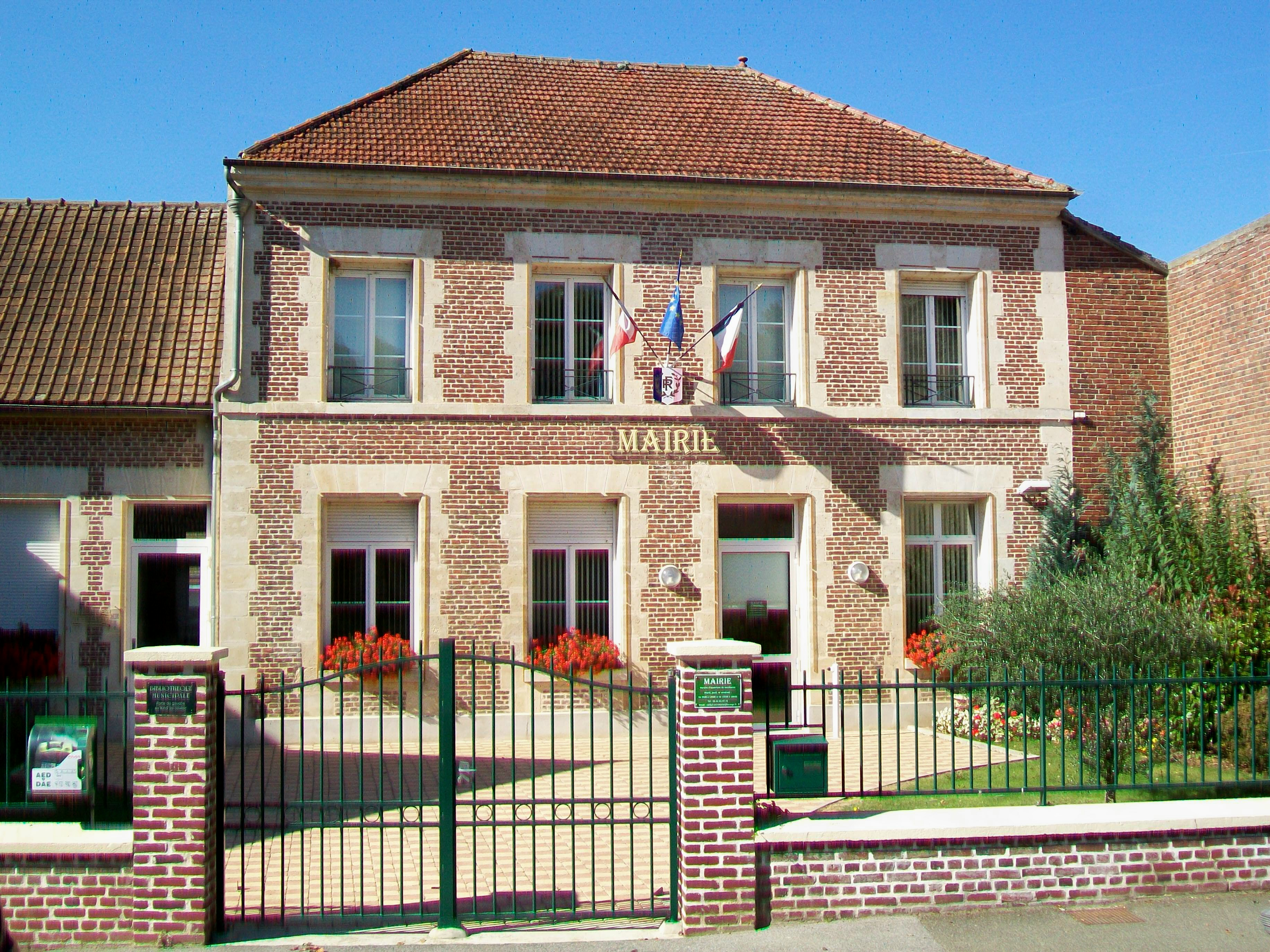
- The town hall in Canly
- Location of Canly
- Location within France Location within Hauts-de-France
- Coordinates: 49°23′14″N 2°42′32″E
- Country: France
- Region: Hauts-de-France
- Department: Oise
- Arrondissement: Compiègne
- Canton: Estrées-Saint-Denis
- Intercommunality: Plaine d'Estrées

Government
  - Mayor (2020–2026): Lionel Guibon
- Area^{1}: 8 km^{2} (3.1 sq mi)
- Elevation: 67 m (220 ft)
- Highest elevation: 129 m (423 ft)
- Lowest elevation: 48 m (157 ft)
- Population (2023): 741
  - Density: 93/km^{2} (240/sq mi)
- Time zone: UTC+01:00 (CET)
  - Summer (DST): UTC+02:00 (CEST)
- INSEE/Postal code: 60125 /60680
- ^{1} French Land Register data, which excludes lakes, ponds, glaciers > 1 km^{2} (0.386 sq mi or 247 acres) and river estuaries.

Canly (French pronunciation: [kɑ̃li]) is a commune in the Oise department in northern France.
