= Courcelles-Epayelles =

- Commune
- Location of Courcelles-Epayelles
- Location within France Location within Hauts-de-France
- Coordinates: 49°34′07″N 2°37′42″E
- Country: France
- Region: Hauts-de-France
- Department: Oise
- Arrondissement: Clermont
- Canton: Estrées-Saint-Denis
- Intercommunality: Plateau Picard

Government
  - Mayor (2020–2026): Jean-Louis Hennon
- Area^{1}: 6.38 km^{2} (2.46 sq mi)
- Elevation: 90 m (300 ft)
- Highest elevation: 109 m (358 ft)
- Lowest elevation: 84 m (276 ft)
- Population (2023): 210
  - Density: 33/km^{2} (85/sq mi)
- Time zone: UTC+01:00 (CET)
  - Summer (DST): UTC+02:00 (CEST)
- INSEE/Postal code: 60168 /60420
- ^{1} French Land Register data, which excludes lakes, ponds, glaciers > 1 km^{2} (0.386 sq mi or 247 acres) and river estuaries.

Courcelles-Epayelles (French pronunciation: [kuʁsɛl ɛpajɛl]) is a commune in the northern French department of Oise.

== See also ==
- Communes of the Oise department
