= Vignemont =

- Commune
- Location of Vignemont
- Location within France Location within Hauts-de-France
- Coordinates: 49°30′10″N 2°46′38″E
- Country: France
- Region: Hauts-de-France
- Department: Oise
- Arrondissement: Compiègne
- Canton: Estrées-Saint-Denis
- Intercommunality: Pays des Sources

Government
  - Mayor (2020–2026): Laurence Caivano-Tellier
- Area^{1}: 4.23 km^{2} (1.63 sq mi)
- Elevation: 80 m (260 ft)
- Highest elevation: 136 m (446 ft)
- Lowest elevation: 50 m (160 ft)
- Population (2023): 417
  - Density: 98.6/km^{2} (255/sq mi)
- Time zone: UTC+01:00 (CET)
  - Summer (DST): UTC+02:00 (CEST)
- INSEE/Postal code: 60675 /60162
- ^{1} French Land Register data, which excludes lakes, ponds, glaciers > 1 km^{2} (0.386 sq mi or 247 acres) and river estuaries.

Vignemont (French pronunciation: [viɲmɔ̃]) is a commune in the Oise department in northern France.

== See also ==
- Communes of the Oise department
