= Rouvillers =

- Commune
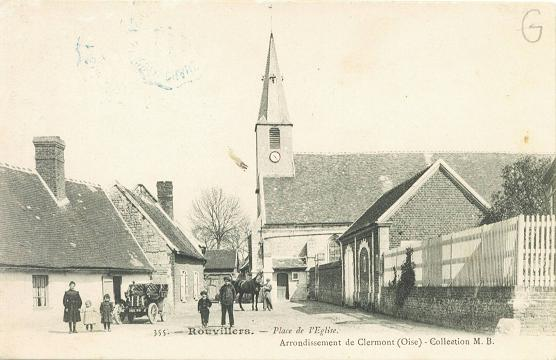
- The church in Rouvillers
- Location of Rouvillers
- Location within France Location within Hauts-de-France
- Coordinates: 49°27′10″N 2°36′37″E
- Country: France
- Region: Hauts-de-France
- Department: Oise
- Arrondissement: Clermont
- Canton: Estrées-Saint-Denis
- Intercommunality: Plateau Picard

Government
  - Mayor (2020–2026): Nicolas Sainte-Beuve
- Area^{1}: 11.88 km^{2} (4.59 sq mi)
- Elevation: 86 m (282 ft)
- Highest elevation: 89 m (292 ft)
- Lowest elevation: 66 m (217 ft)
- Population (2023): 277
  - Density: 23.3/km^{2} (60.4/sq mi)
- Time zone: UTC+01:00 (CET)
  - Summer (DST): UTC+02:00 (CEST)
- INSEE/Postal code: 60553 /60190
- ^{1} French Land Register data, which excludes lakes, ponds, glaciers > 1 km^{2} (0.386 sq mi or 247 acres) and river estuaries.

Rouvillers is a commune in the Oise department in northern France.

== See also ==
- Communes of the Oise department
