= Cernoy =

- Commune
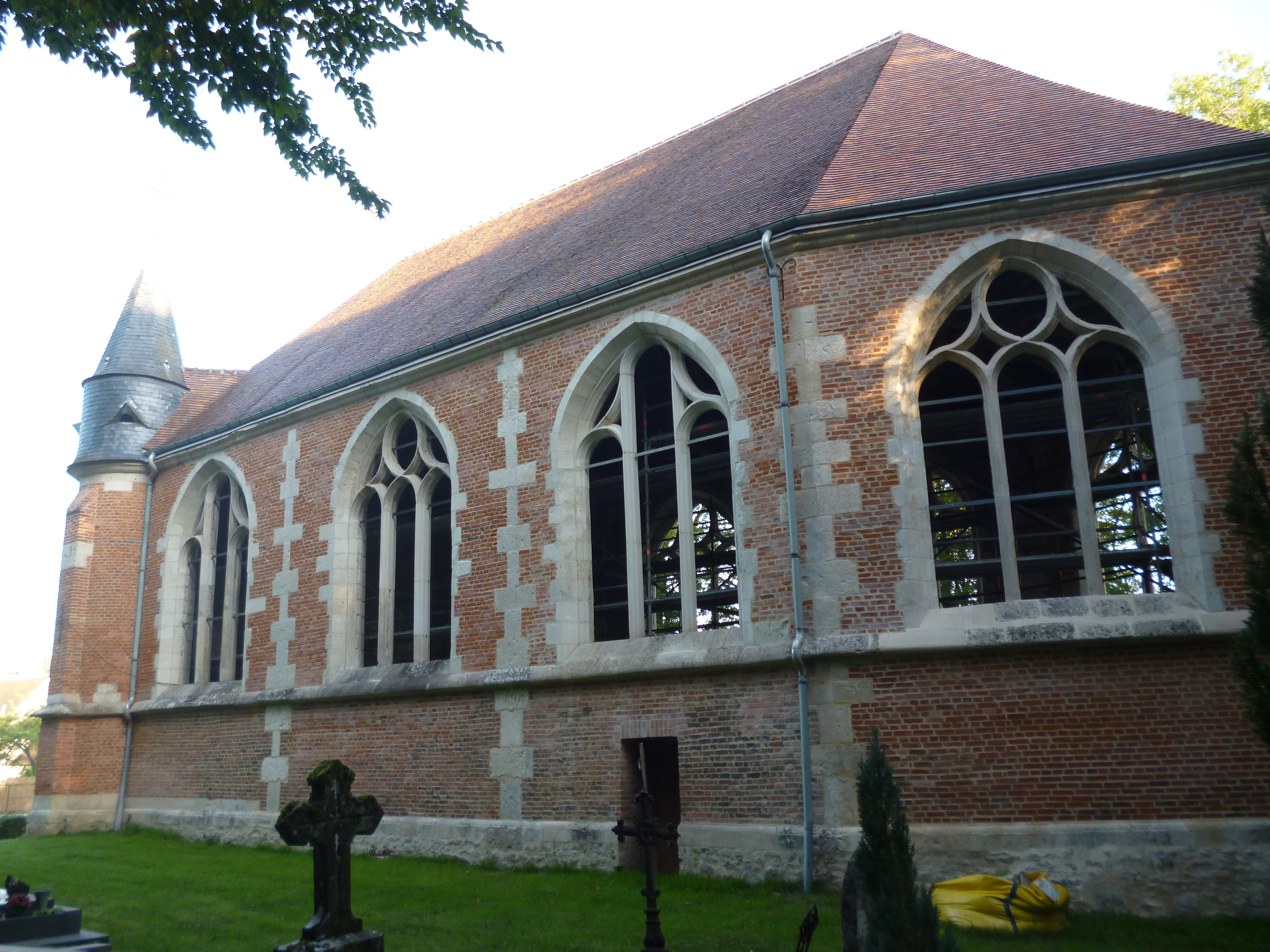
- The chapel in Cernoy
- Location of Cernoy
- Location within France Location within Hauts-de-France
- Coordinates: 49°26′29″N 2°32′29″E
- Country: France
- Region: Hauts-de-France
- Department: Oise
- Arrondissement: Clermont
- Canton: Estrées-Saint-Denis
- Intercommunality: Plateau Picard

Government
  - Mayor (2020–2026): Isabelle Barthe
- Area^{1}: 4.91 km^{2} (1.90 sq mi)
- Elevation: 104 m (341 ft)
- Highest elevation: 155 m (509 ft)
- Lowest elevation: 100 m (330 ft)
- Population (2023): 288
  - Density: 58.7/km^{2} (152/sq mi)
- Time zone: UTC+01:00 (CET)
  - Summer (DST): UTC+02:00 (CEST)
- INSEE/Postal code: 60137 /60190
- ^{1} French Land Register data, which excludes lakes, ponds, glaciers > 1 km^{2} (0.386 sq mi or 247 acres) and river estuaries.

Cernoy (French pronunciation: [sɛʁnwa]) is a commune in the Oise department in northern France.

== See also ==
- Communes of the Oise department
