= Canton of Estrées-Saint-Denis =

Canton of France

Coordinates: 49.43°N 2.64°E

- Canton
- Situation of the canton of Estrées-Saint-Denis in the department of Oise
- Country: France
- Region: Hauts-de-France
- Department: Oise
- No. of communes: {{{nbcomm}}}
- Population (2023): 42,417
- INSEE code: 6010

The canton of Estrées-Saint-Denis is an administrative division of the Oise department, northern France. Its borders were modified at the French canton reorganisation which came into effect in March 2015. Its seat is in Estrées-Saint-Denis.

It consists of the following communes:

1. Antheuil-Portes
2. Arsy
3. Avrigny
4. Bailleul-le-Soc
5. Baugy
6. Belloy
7. Biermont
8. Blincourt
9. Boulogne-la-Grasse
10. Braisnes-sur-Aronde
11. Canly
12. Cernoy
13. Chevrières
14. Choisy-la-Victoire
15. Coivrel
16. Conchy-les-Pots
17. Coudun
18. Courcelles-Epayelles
19. Cressonsacq
20. Crèvecœur-le-Petit
21. Cuvilly
22. Domfront
23. Dompierre
24. Épineuse
25. Estrées-Saint-Denis
26. Le Fayel
27. Ferrières
28. Francières
29. Le Frestoy-Vaux
30. Giraumont
31. Godenvillers
32. Gournay-sur-Aronde
33. Grandfresnoy
34. Grandvillers-aux-Bois
35. Hainvillers
36. Hémévillers
37. Houdancourt
38. Lataule
39. Léglantiers
40. Longueil-Sainte-Marie
41. Maignelay-Montigny
42. Margny-sur-Matz
43. Marquéglise
44. Ménévillers
45. Méry-la-Bataille
46. Monchy-Humières
47. Montgérain
48. Montiers
49. Montmartin
50. Mortemer
51. Moyenneville
52. Moyvillers
53. Neufvy-sur-Aronde
54. La Neuville-Roy
55. La Neuville-sur-Ressons
56. Orvillers-Sorel
57. Le Ployron
58. Pronleroy
59. Remy
60. Ressons-sur-Matz
61. Ricquebourg
62. Rivecourt
63. Rouvillers
64. Royaucourt
65. Sains-Morainvillers
66. Saint-Martin-aux-Bois
67. Tricot
68. Vignemont
69. Villers-sur-Coudun
70. Wacquemoulin
71. Welles-Pérennes
