= Conchy-les-Pots =

- Commune
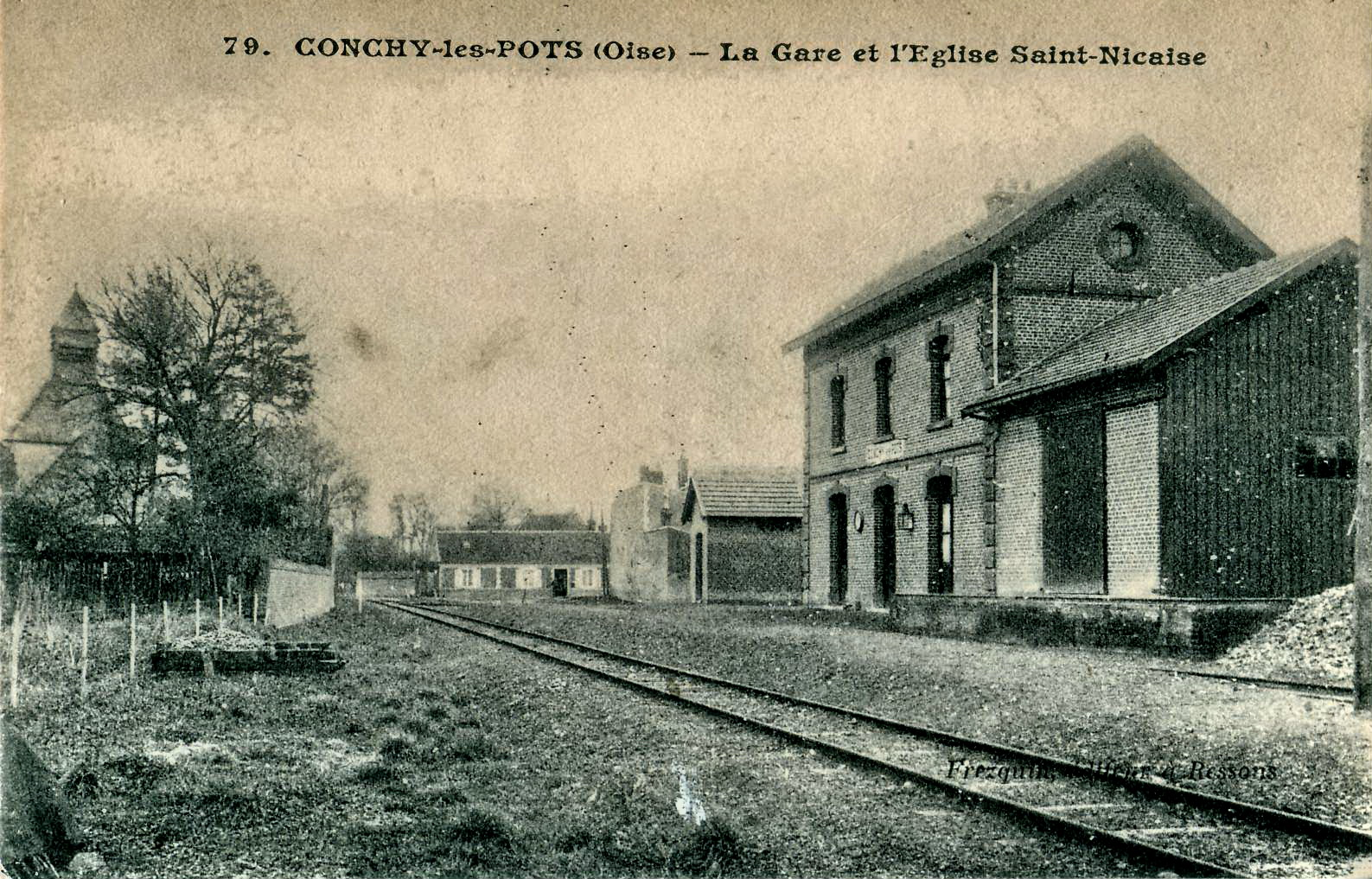
- The railway station and church in Conchy-les-Pots
- Location of Conchy-les-Pots
- Location within France Location within Hauts-de-France
- Coordinates: 49°36′18″N 2°43′45″E
- Country: France
- Region: Hauts-de-France
- Department: Oise
- Arrondissement: Compiègne
- Canton: Estrées-Saint-Denis
- Intercommunality: Pays des Sources

Government
  - Mayor (2020–2026): Marie-Christine Pinsson
- Area^{1}: 9.67 km^{2} (3.73 sq mi)
- Elevation: 110 m (360 ft)
- Highest elevation: 117 m (384 ft)
- Lowest elevation: 74 m (243 ft)
- Population (2023): 734
  - Density: 75.9/km^{2} (197/sq mi)
- Time zone: UTC+01:00 (CET)
  - Summer (DST): UTC+02:00 (CEST)
- INSEE/Postal code: 60160 /60490
- ^{1} French Land Register data, which excludes lakes, ponds, glaciers > 1 km^{2} (0.386 sq mi or 247 acres) and river estuaries.

Conchy-les-Pots (French pronunciation: [kɔ̃ʃi le po]) is a commune in the Oise department in northern France.

== See also ==
- Communes of the Oise department
