= Lataule =

- Commune
- Location of Lataule
- Location within France Location within Hauts-de-France
- Coordinates: 49°32′27″N 2°40′51″E
- Country: France
- Region: Hauts-de-France
- Department: Oise
- Arrondissement: Compiègne
- Canton: Estrées-Saint-Denis
- Intercommunality: Pays des Sources

Government
  - Mayor (2020–2026): René Mahet
- Area^{1}: 7.37 km^{2} (2.85 sq mi)
- Elevation: 132 m (433 ft)
- Highest elevation: 133 m (436 ft)
- Lowest elevation: 59 m (194 ft)
- Population (2023): 115
  - Density: 15.6/km^{2} (40.4/sq mi)
- Time zone: UTC+01:00 (CET)
  - Summer (DST): UTC+02:00 (CEST)
- INSEE/Postal code: 60351 /60490
- ^{1} French Land Register data, which excludes lakes, ponds, glaciers > 1 km^{2} (0.386 sq mi or 247 acres) and river estuaries.

Lataule (French pronunciation: [latol]) is a commune in the Oise department in northern France.

== See also ==
- Communes of the Oise department
