= Moyvillers =

- Commune
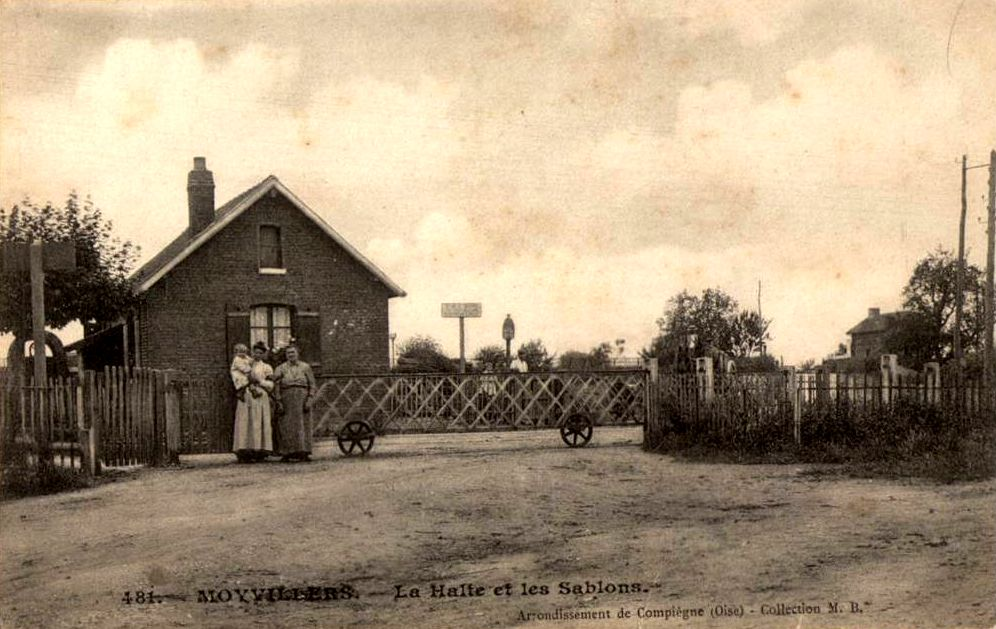
- An early 20th century view of the level crossing in Moyvillers
- Location of Moyvillers
- Location within France Location within Hauts-de-France
- Coordinates: 49°24′56″N 2°39′06″E
- Country: France
- Region: Hauts-de-France
- Department: Oise
- Arrondissement: Compiègne
- Canton: Estrées-Saint-Denis
- Intercommunality: Plaine d'Estrées

Government
  - Mayor (2020–2026): Annick Decamp
- Area^{1}: 9.06 km^{2} (3.50 sq mi)
- Elevation: 90 m (300 ft)
- Highest elevation: 114 m (374 ft)
- Lowest elevation: 73 m (240 ft)
- Population (2023): 647
  - Density: 71.4/km^{2} (185/sq mi)
- Time zone: UTC+01:00 (CET)
  - Summer (DST): UTC+02:00 (CEST)
- INSEE/Postal code: 60441 /60190
- ^{1} French Land Register data, which excludes lakes, ponds, glaciers > 1 km^{2} (0.386 sq mi or 247 acres) and river estuaries.

Moyvillers is a commune in the Oise department in northern France.

== See also ==
- Communes of the Oise department
