= Avrigny =

- Commune
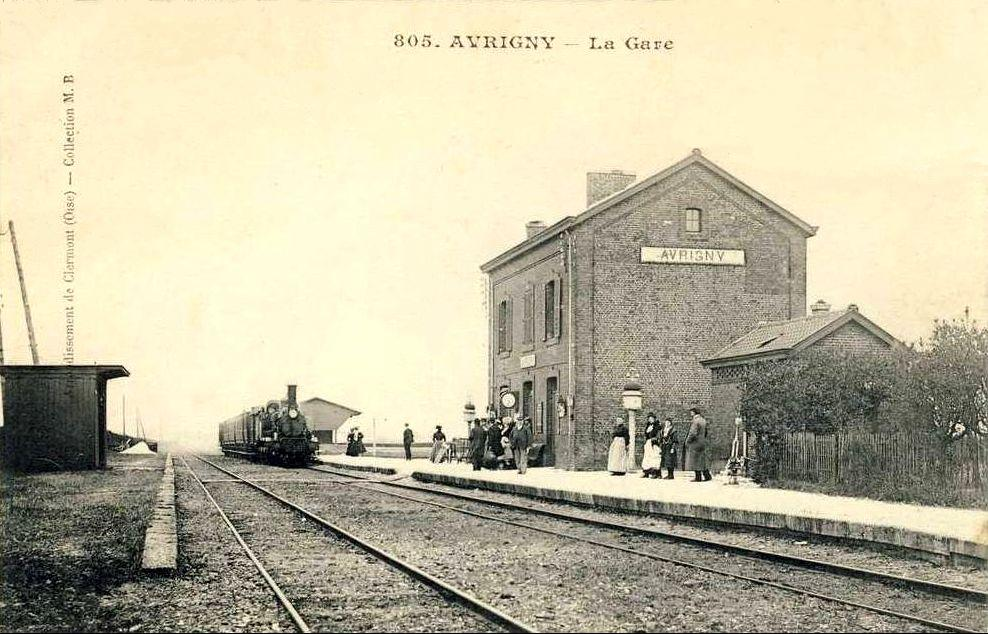
- The railway station in Avrigny in the early 20th century

- Coat of arms
- Location of Avrigny
- Location within France Location within Hauts-de-France
- Coordinates: 49°22′54″N 2°34′52″E
- Country: France
- Region: Hauts-de-France
- Department: Oise
- Arrondissement: Clermont
- Canton: Estrées-Saint-Denis
- Intercommunality: CC Plaine Estrées

Government
  - Mayor (2020–2026): Gilbert Versluys
- Area^{1}: 6.01 km^{2} (2.32 sq mi)
- Elevation: 86 m (282 ft)
- Highest elevation: 121 m (397 ft)
- Lowest elevation: 65 m (213 ft)
- Population (2023): 404
  - Density: 67.2/km^{2} (174/sq mi)
- Time zone: UTC+01:00 (CET)
  - Summer (DST): UTC+02:00 (CEST)
- INSEE/Postal code: 60036 /60190
- ^{1} French Land Register data, which excludes lakes, ponds, glaciers > 1 km^{2} (0.386 sq mi or 247 acres) and river estuaries.

Avrigny (French pronunciation: [avʁiɲi]) is a commune in the Oise department in northern France.

== Population ==
Historical population
| Year | Pop. | ±% p.a. |
|---|---|---|
| 1968 | 269 | — |
| 1975 | 242 | −1.50% |
| 1982 | 265 | +1.31% |
| 1990 | 294 | +1.31% |
| 1999 | 320 | +0.95% |
| 2007 | 320 | +0.00% |
| 2012 | 353 | +1.98% |
| 2017 | 373 | +1.11% |
| 2023 | 404 | +1.34% |
Source: INSEE

== See also ==
- Communes of the Oise department
