= Choisy-la-Victoire =

- Commune
- Coat of arms
- Location of Choisy-la-Victoire
- Location within France Location within Hauts-de-France
- Coordinates: 49°22′43″N 2°35′11″E
- Country: France
- Region: Hauts-de-France
- Department: Oise
- Arrondissement: Clermont
- Canton: Estrées-Saint-Denis
- Intercommunality: Plaine d'Estrées

Government
  - Mayor (2020–2026): Brigitte Parrot
- Area^{1}: 9.97 km^{2} (3.85 sq mi)
- Elevation: 103 m (338 ft)
- Highest elevation: 113 m (371 ft)
- Lowest elevation: 34 m (112 ft)
- Population (2023): 252
  - Density: 25.3/km^{2} (65.5/sq mi)
- Demonym: Choisiens
- Time zone: UTC+01:00 (CET)
  - Summer (DST): UTC+02:00 (CEST)
- INSEE/Postal code: 60152 /60190
- ^{1} French Land Register data, which excludes lakes, ponds, glaciers > 1 km^{2} (0.386 sq mi or 247 acres) and river estuaries.

Choisy-la-Victoire (French pronunciation: [ʃwazi la viktwaʁ]; lit. 'Choisy-the-Victory') is a rural commune in the Oise department in northern France.

== See also ==
- Communes of the Oise department
