= Le Frestoy-Vaux =

- Commune
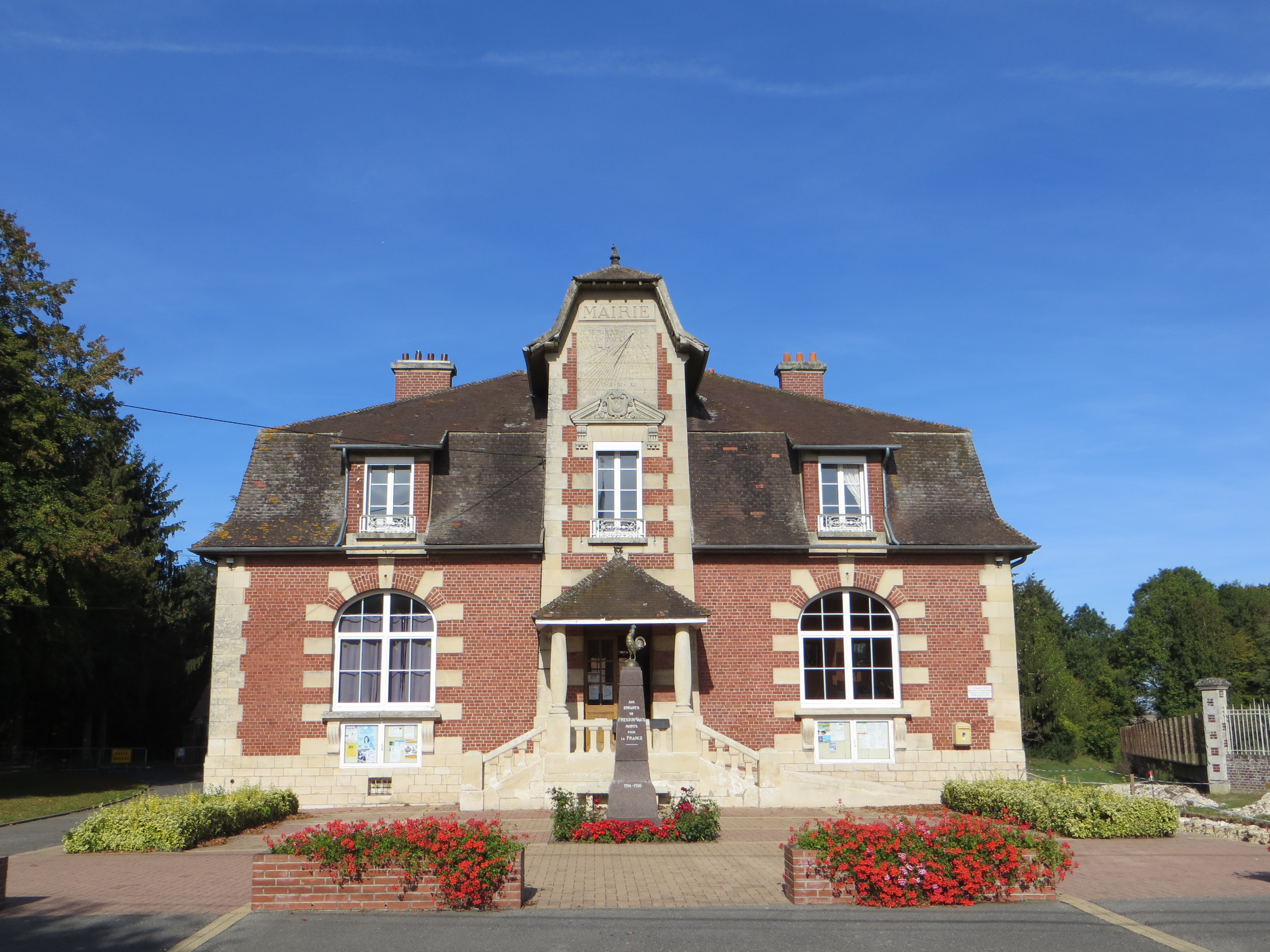
- Town hall
- Location of Le Frestoy-Vaux
- Location within France Location within Hauts-de-France
- Coordinates: 49°35′56″N 2°36′19″E
- Country: France
- Region: Hauts-de-France
- Department: Oise
- Arrondissement: Clermont
- Canton: Estrées-Saint-Denis
- Intercommunality: Plateau Picard

Government
  - Mayor (2020–2026): Patrice Fontaine
- Area^{1}: 8.79 km^{2} (3.39 sq mi)
- Elevation: 80 m (260 ft)
- Highest elevation: 102 m (335 ft)
- Lowest elevation: 67 m (220 ft)
- Population (2023): 224
  - Density: 25.5/km^{2} (66.0/sq mi)
- Time zone: UTC+01:00 (CET)
  - Summer (DST): UTC+02:00 (CEST)
- INSEE/Postal code: 60262 /60420
- ^{1} French Land Register data, which excludes lakes, ponds, glaciers > 1 km^{2} (0.386 sq mi or 247 acres) and river estuaries.

Le Frestoy-Vaux (French pronunciation: [lə fʁetwa vo]) is a commune in the Oise department in northern France.

== See also ==
- Communes of the Oise department
