= Royaucourt =

- Commune
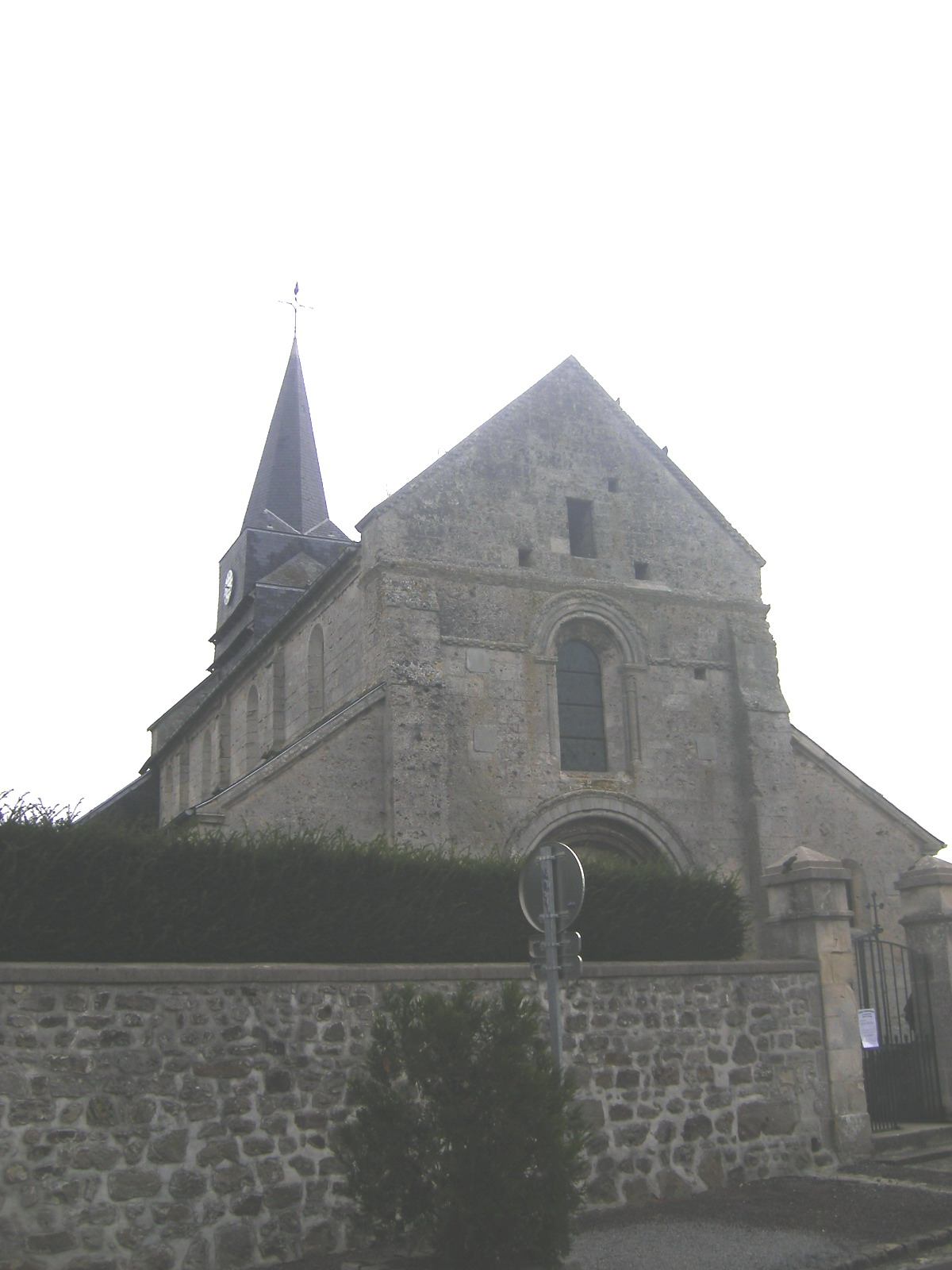
- The church in Royaucourt
- Location of Royaucourt
- Location within France Location within Hauts-de-France
- Coordinates: 49°37′N 2°32′E
- Country: France
- Region: Hauts-de-France
- Department: Oise
- Arrondissement: Clermont
- Canton: Estrées-Saint-Denis
- Intercommunality: Plateau Picard

Government
  - Mayor (2020–2026): Laurent Gesbert
- Area^{1}: 9.45 km^{2} (3.65 sq mi)
- Elevation: 100 m (330 ft)
- Highest elevation: 127 m (417 ft)
- Lowest elevation: 62 m (203 ft)
- Population (2023): 215
  - Density: 22.8/km^{2} (58.9/sq mi)
- Time zone: UTC+01:00 (CET)
  - Summer (DST): UTC+02:00 (CEST)
- INSEE/Postal code: 60556 /60420
- ^{1} French Land Register data, which excludes lakes, ponds, glaciers > 1 km^{2} (0.386 sq mi or 247 acres) and river estuaries.

Royaucourt (French pronunciation: [ʁwajokuʁ]) is a commune in the Oise department in northern France.

== See also ==
- Communes of the Oise department
