= Baugy, Oise =

Baugy
- Commune
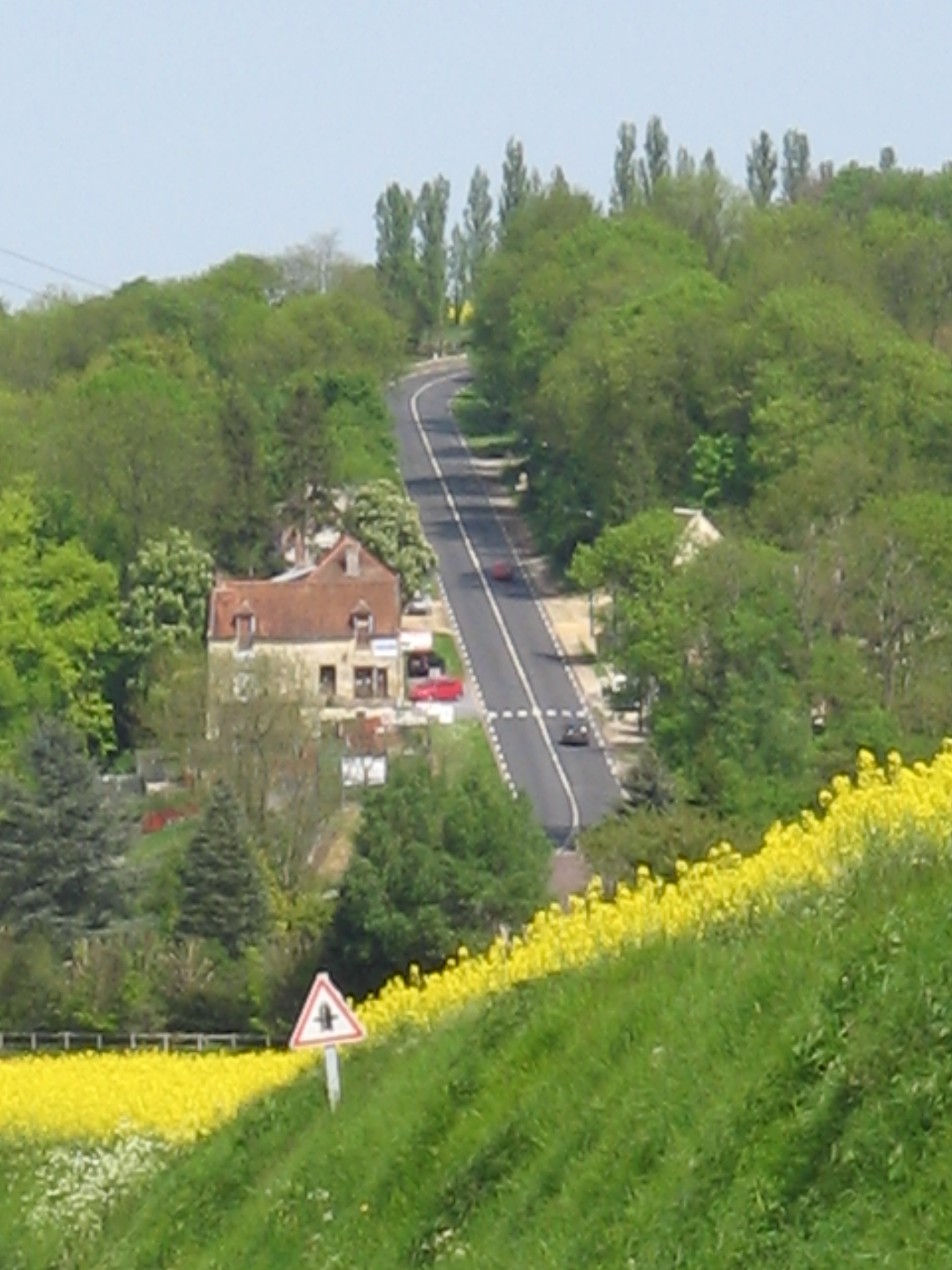
- The landscape of Baugy
- Location of Baugy
- Location within France Location within Hauts-de-France
- Coordinates: 49°27′50″N 2°45′14″E
- Country: France
- Region: Hauts-de-France
- Department: Oise
- Arrondissement: Compiègne
- Canton: Estrées-Saint-Denis
- Intercommunality: Pays des Sources

Government
  - Mayor (2020–2026): Jean-Claude Darcy
- Area^{1}: 7.17 km^{2} (2.77 sq mi)
- Elevation: 98 m (322 ft)
- Highest elevation: 105 m (344 ft)
- Lowest elevation: 41 m (135 ft)
- Population (2023): 286
  - Density: 39.9/km^{2} (103/sq mi)
- Time zone: UTC+01:00 (CET)
  - Summer (DST): UTC+02:00 (CEST)
- INSEE/Postal code: 60048 /60113
- ^{1} French Land Register data, which excludes lakes, ponds, glaciers > 1 km^{2} (0.386 sq mi or 247 acres) and river estuaries.

Baugy (French pronunciation: [boʒi]) is a commune in the Oise department in northern France.

== Population ==
Historical population
Year	Pop.	±% p.a.
1968	220	—
1975	218	−0.13%
1982	221	+0.20%
1990	233	+0.66%
1999	263	+1.35%
2007	286	+1.05%
2012	305	+1.29%
2017	241	−4.60%
2023	286	+2.89%
Source: INSEE

== See also ==
- Communes of the Oise department
