= Grandfresnoy =

- Commune
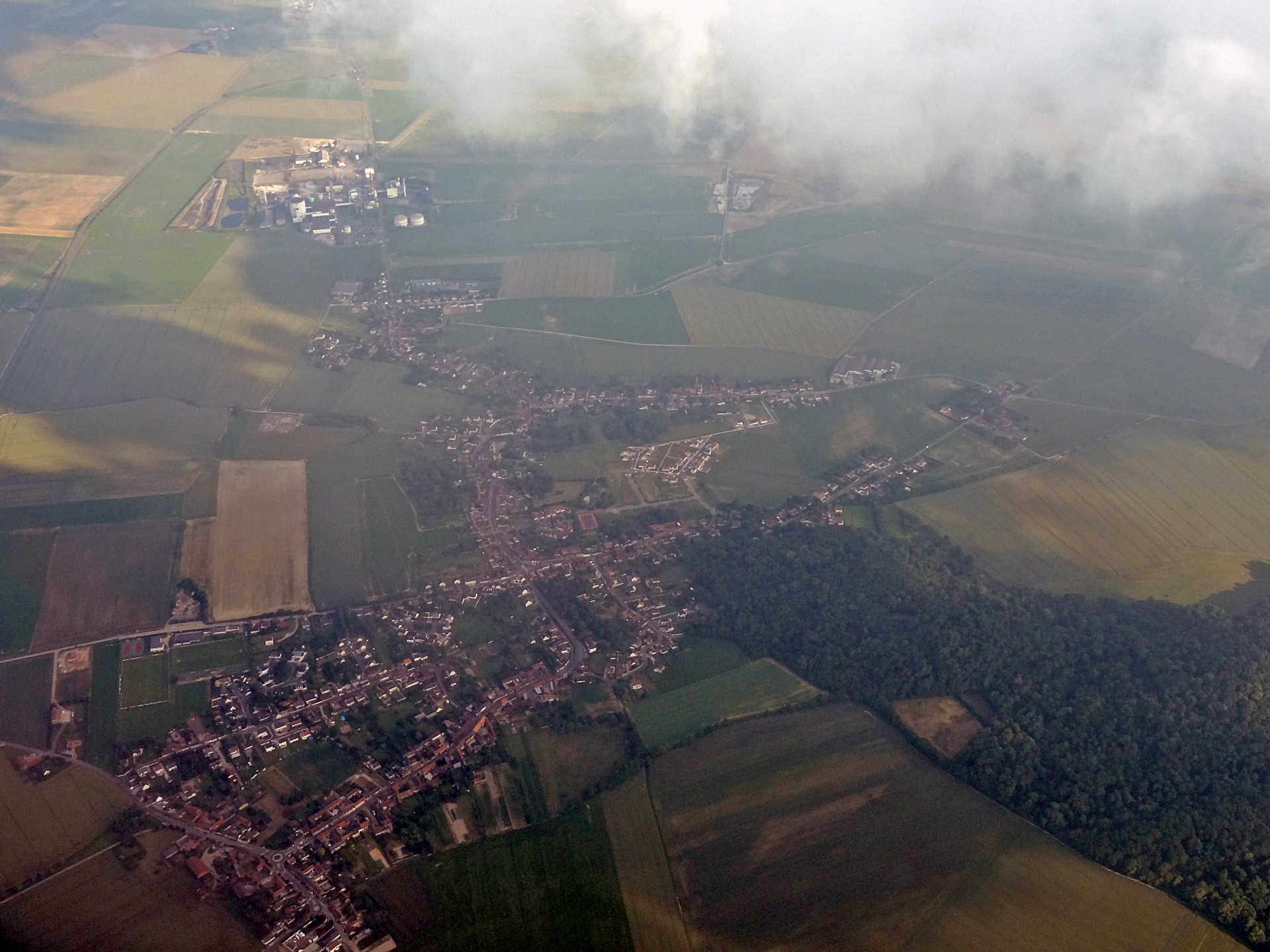
- An aerial view of Grandfresnoy
- Location of Grandfresnoy
- Location within France Location within Hauts-de-France
- Coordinates: 49°22′12″N 2°39′20″E
- Country: France
- Region: Hauts-de-France
- Department: Oise
- Arrondissement: Compiègne
- Canton: Estrées-Saint-Denis
- Intercommunality: Plaine d'Estrées

Government
  - Mayor (2020–2026): Ivan Wasylyzyn
- Area^{1}: 10.57 km^{2} (4.08 sq mi)
- Elevation: 82 m (269 ft)
- Highest elevation: 131 m (430 ft)
- Lowest elevation: 45 m (148 ft)
- Population (2023): 1,829
  - Density: 173.0/km^{2} (448.2/sq mi)
- Time zone: UTC+01:00 (CET)
  - Summer (DST): UTC+02:00 (CEST)
- INSEE/Postal code: 60284 /60680
- ^{1} French Land Register data, which excludes lakes, ponds, glaciers > 1 km^{2} (0.386 sq mi or 247 acres) and river estuaries.

Grandfresnoy (French pronunciation: [ɡʁɑ̃fʁɛnwa]) is a commune in the Oise department in northern France.

== See also ==
- Communes of the Oise department
