= Léglantiers =

- Commune
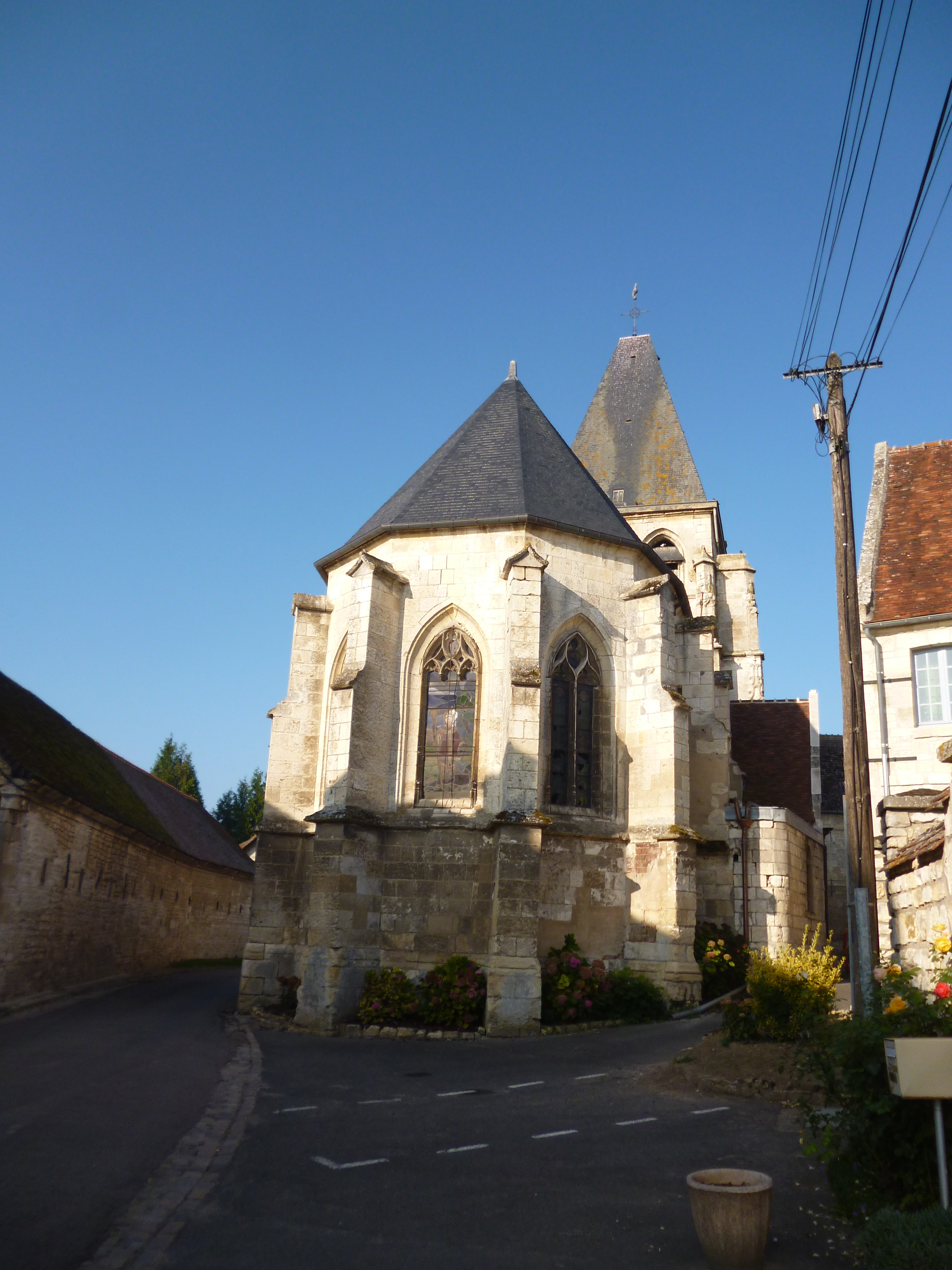
- The church in Léglantiers
- Location of Léglantiers
- Location within France Location within Hauts-de-France
- Coordinates: 49°29′48″N 2°32′07″E
- Country: France
- Region: Hauts-de-France
- Department: Oise
- Arrondissement: Clermont
- Canton: Estrées-Saint-Denis
- Intercommunality: Plateau Picard

Government
  - Mayor (2020–2026): Julien Bonnement
- Area^{1}: 7.78 km^{2} (3.00 sq mi)
- Elevation: 100 m (330 ft)
- Highest elevation: 122 m (400 ft)
- Lowest elevation: 77 m (253 ft)
- Population (2023): 548
  - Density: 70.4/km^{2} (182/sq mi)
- Time zone: UTC+01:00 (CET)
  - Summer (DST): UTC+02:00 (CEST)
- INSEE/Postal code: 60357 /60420
- ^{1} French Land Register data, which excludes lakes, ponds, glaciers > 1 km^{2} (0.386 sq mi or 247 acres) and river estuaries.

Léglantiers (French pronunciation: [leɡlɑ̃tje]) is a commune in the Oise department in northern France.

== See also ==
- Communes of the Oise department
