= Belloy, Oise =

Belloy
- Commune
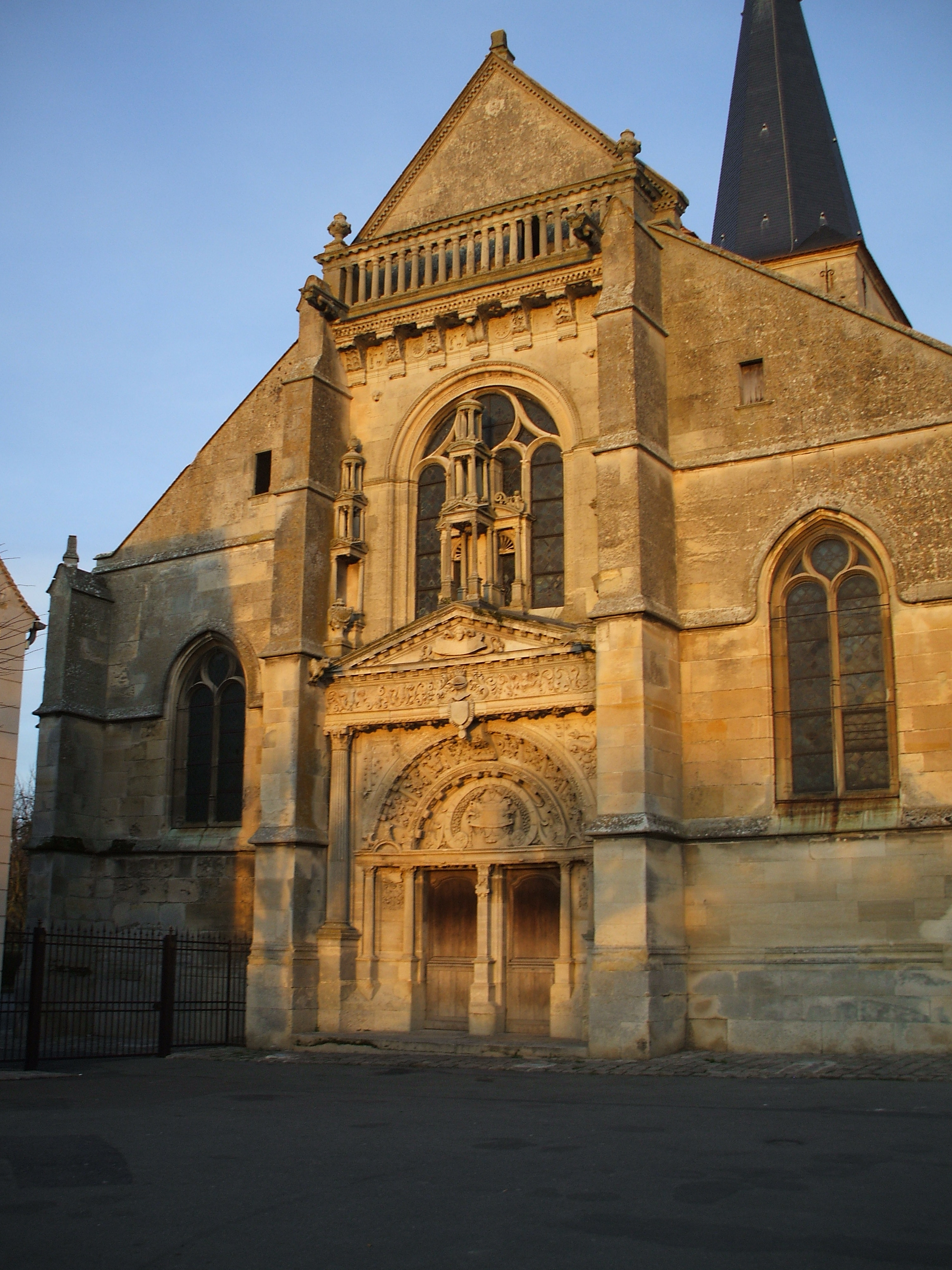
- Location of Belloy
- Location within France Location within Hauts-de-France
- Coordinates: 49°32′11″N 2°39′18″E
- Country: France
- Region: Hauts-de-France
- Department: Oise
- Arrondissement: Compiègne
- Canton: Estrées-Saint-Denis
- Intercommunality: Pays des Sources

Government
  - Mayor (2020–2026): Christian Cardon
- Area^{1}: 2.98 km^{2} (1.15 sq mi)
- Elevation: 130 m (430 ft)
- Highest elevation: 133 m (436 ft)
- Lowest elevation: 75 m (246 ft)
- Population (2023): 68
  - Density: 23/km^{2} (59/sq mi)
- Time zone: UTC+01:00 (CET)
  - Summer (DST): UTC+02:00 (CEST)
- INSEE/Postal code: 60061 /60490
- ^{1} French Land Register data, which excludes lakes, ponds, glaciers > 1 km^{2} (0.386 sq mi or 247 acres) and river estuaries.

Belloy (French pronunciation: [bɛlwa]) is a commune in the Oise department in northern France.

== Population ==
Historical population
| Year | Pop. | ±% p.a. |
|---|---|---|
| 1968 | 49 | — |
| 1975 | 53 | +1.13% |
| 1982 | 62 | +2.27% |
| 1990 | 64 | +0.40% |
| 1999 | 71 | +1.16% |
| 2007 | 84 | +2.12% |
| 2012 | 88 | +0.93% |
| 2017 | 94 | +1.33% |
| 2023 | 68 | −5.25% |
Source: INSEE

== See also ==
- Communes of the Oise department
