= La Neuville-sur-Ressons =

- Commune
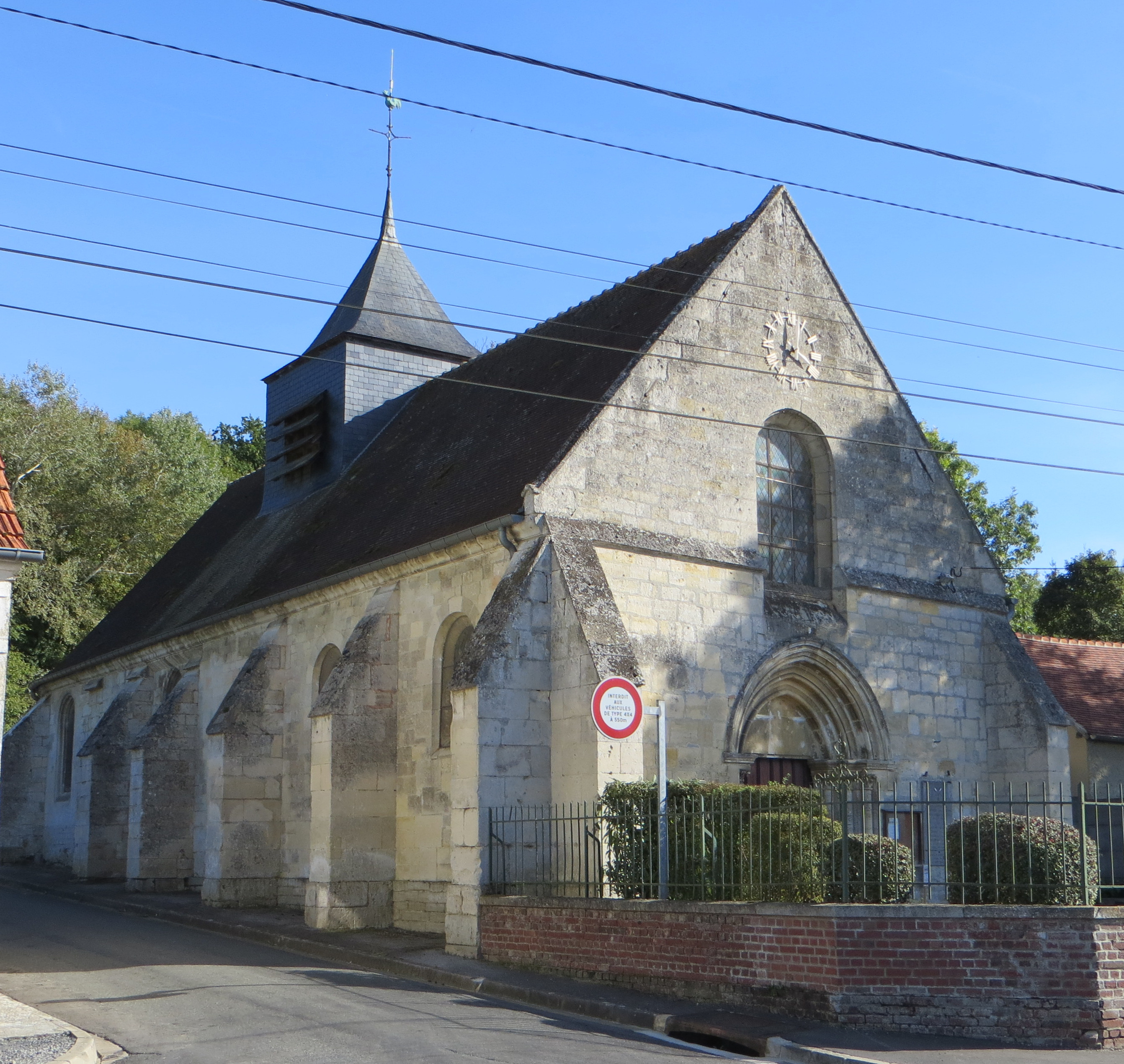
- The church in La Neuville-sur-Ressons
- Location of La Neuville-sur-Ressons
- Location within France Location within Hauts-de-France
- Coordinates: 49°33′08″N 2°45′12″E
- Country: France
- Region: Hauts-de-France
- Department: Oise
- Arrondissement: Compiègne
- Canton: Estrées-Saint-Denis
- Intercommunality: Pays des Sources

Government
  - Mayor (2020–2026): Gaël Daniel
- Area^{1}: 2.68 km^{2} (1.03 sq mi)
- Elevation: 74 m (243 ft)
- Highest elevation: 130 m (430 ft)
- Lowest elevation: 56 m (184 ft)
- Population (2023): 200
  - Density: 75/km^{2} (190/sq mi)
- Time zone: UTC+01:00 (CET)
  - Summer (DST): UTC+02:00 (CEST)
- INSEE/Postal code: 60459 /60490
- ^{1} French Land Register data, which excludes lakes, ponds, glaciers > 1 km^{2} (0.386 sq mi or 247 acres) and river estuaries.

La Neuville-sur-Ressons (French pronunciation: [la nøvil syʁ ʁəsɔ̃], literally La Neuville on Ressons) is a commune in the Oise department in northern France.

== See also ==
- Communes of the Oise department
