= Giraumont, Oise =

Giraumont
- Commune
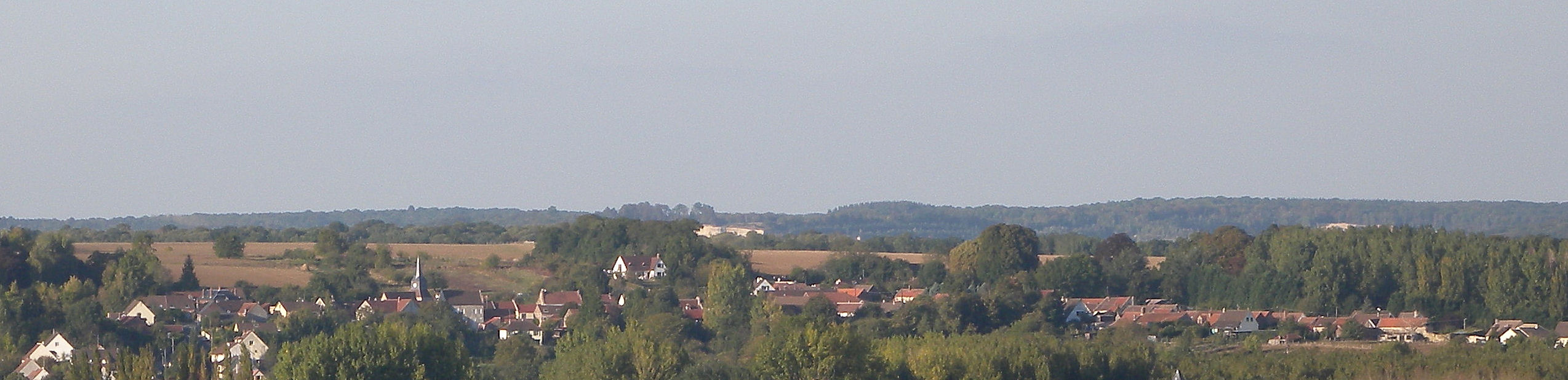
- Landscape of the commune
- Location of Giraumont
- Location within France Location within Hauts-de-France
- Coordinates: 49°28′17″N 2°49′10″E
- Country: France
- Region: Hauts-de-France
- Department: Oise
- Arrondissement: Compiègne
- Canton: Estrées-Saint-Denis
- Intercommunality: Pays des Sources

Government
  - Mayor (2020–2026): Michel Guibert
- Area^{1}: 3.55 km^{2} (1.37 sq mi)
- Elevation: 103 m (338 ft)
- Highest elevation: 105 m (344 ft)
- Lowest elevation: 42 m (138 ft)
- Population (2023): 518
  - Density: 146/km^{2} (378/sq mi)
- Time zone: UTC+01:00 (CET)
  - Summer (DST): UTC+02:00 (CEST)
- INSEE/Postal code: 60273 /60150
- ^{1} French Land Register data, which excludes lakes, ponds, glaciers > 1 km^{2} (0.386 sq mi or 247 acres) and river estuaries.

Giraumont (French pronunciation: [ʒiʁomɔ̃]) is a commune in the Oise department in northern France.

== See also ==
- Communes of the Oise department
