= Biermont =

- Commune
- Location of Biermont
- Location within France Location within Hauts-de-France
- Coordinates: 49°34′57″N 2°44′05″E
- Country: France
- Region: Hauts-de-France
- Department: Oise
- Arrondissement: Compiègne
- Canton: Estrées-Saint-Denis
- Intercommunality: Pays des Sources

Government
  - Mayor (2020–2026): Francis Mansard
- Area^{1}: 3.92 km^{2} (1.51 sq mi)
- Elevation: 190 m (620 ft)
- Highest elevation: 92 m (302 ft)
- Lowest elevation: 63 m (207 ft)
- Population (2023): 160
  - Density: 41/km^{2} (110/sq mi)
- Time zone: UTC+01:00 (CET)
  - Summer (DST): UTC+02:00 (CEST)
- INSEE/Postal code: 60071 /60490
- ^{1} French Land Register data, which excludes lakes, ponds, glaciers > 1 km^{2} (0.386 sq mi or 247 acres) and river estuaries.

Biermont (French pronunciation: [bjɛʁmɔ̃]) is a commune in the Oise department in northern France.

== Population ==
Historical population
Year	Pop.	±% p.a.
1968	129	—
1975	110	−2.25%
1982	118	+1.01%
1990	133	+1.51%
1999	136	+0.25%
2007	156	+1.73%
2012	174	+2.21%
2017	175	+0.11%
2023	160	−1.48%
Source: INSEE

== See also ==
- Communes of the Oise department
