= Braisnes-sur-Aronde =

- Commune
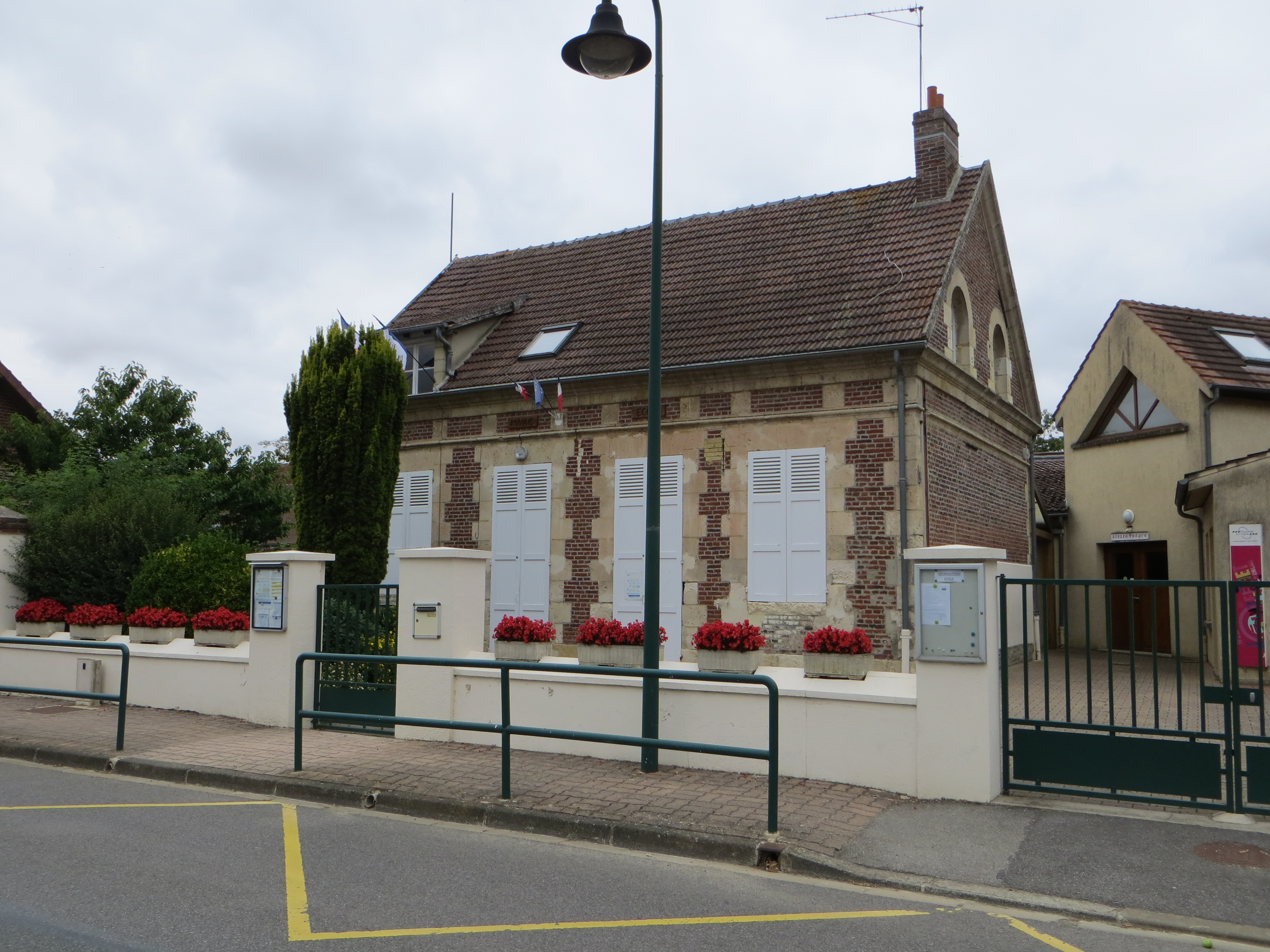
- Braisnes-sur-Aronde Town hall
- Location of Braisnes-sur-Aronde
- Location within France Location within Hauts-de-France
- Coordinates: 49°28′42″N 2°46′33″E
- Country: France
- Region: Hauts-de-France
- Department: Oise
- Arrondissement: Compiègne
- Canton: Estrées-Saint-Denis
- Intercommunality: Pays des Sources

Government
  - Mayor (2020–2026): Pierre Litty
- Area^{1}: 2.6 km^{2} (1.0 sq mi)
- Elevation: 50 m (160 ft)
- Highest elevation: 92 m (302 ft)
- Lowest elevation: 42 m (138 ft)
- Population (2023): 174
  - Density: 67/km^{2} (170/sq mi)
- Time zone: UTC+01:00 (CET)
  - Summer (DST): UTC+02:00 (CEST)
- INSEE/Postal code: 60099 /60113
- ^{1} French Land Register data, which excludes lakes, ponds, glaciers > 1 km^{2} (0.386 sq mi or 247 acres) and river estuaries.

Braisnes-sur-Aronde (French pronunciation: [bʁɛn syʁ aʁɔ̃d]), formerly Braisnes, is a commune in the Oise department in northern France.

== Population ==
Historical population
Year	Pop.	±% p.a.
1968	106	—
1975	101	−0.69%
1982	110	+1.23%
1990	159	+4.71%
1999	179	+1.33%
2007	159	−1.47%
2012	169	+1.23%
2017	169	+0.00%
2023	174	+0.49%
Source: INSEE

== See also ==
- Communes of the Oise department
