= Crèvecœur-le-Petit =

Crèvecoeur-le-Petit
- Commune
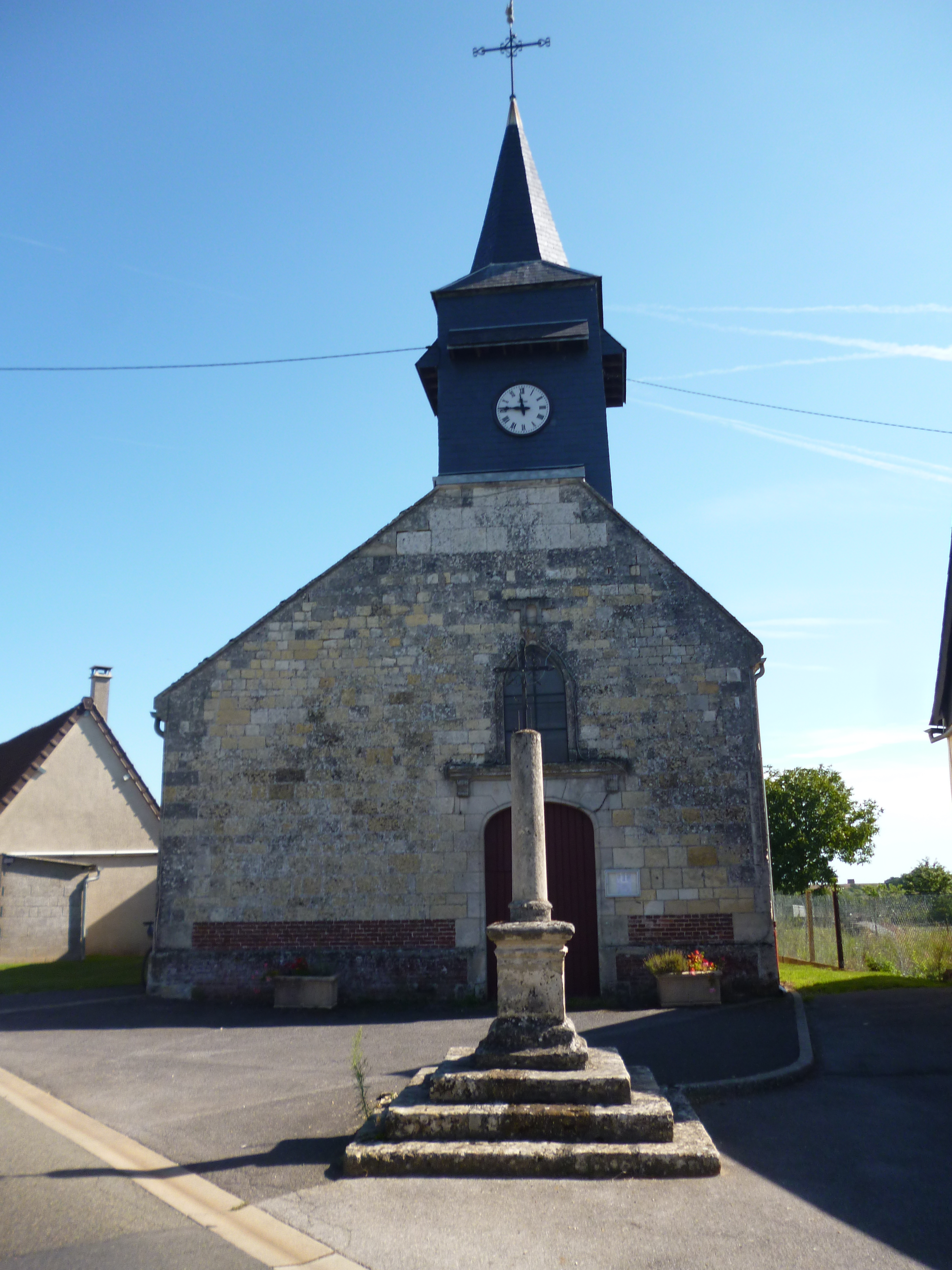
- The church in Crèvecœur-le-Petit
- Location of Crèvecoeur-le-Petit
- Location within France Location within Hauts-de-France
- Coordinates: 49°34′40″N 2°30′16″E
- Country: France
- Region: Hauts-de-France
- Department: Oise
- Arrondissement: Clermont
- Canton: Estrées-Saint-Denis
- Intercommunality: Plateau Picard

Government
  - Mayor (2020–2026): Philippe Hazard
- Area^{1}: 3.33 km^{2} (1.29 sq mi)
- Elevation: 115 m (377 ft)
- Highest elevation: 127 m (417 ft)
- Lowest elevation: 93 m (305 ft)
- Population (2023): 159
  - Density: 47.7/km^{2} (124/sq mi)
- Time zone: UTC+01:00 (CET)
  - Summer (DST): UTC+02:00 (CEST)
- INSEE/Postal code: 60179 /60420
- ^{1} French Land Register data, which excludes lakes, ponds, glaciers > 1 km^{2} (0.386 sq mi or 247 acres) and river estuaries.

Crèvecœur-le-Petit (French pronunciation: [kʁɛvkœʁ lə pəti]) is a commune in the Oise department in northern France.

== See also ==
- Communes of the Oise department
