= Montiers =

- Commune
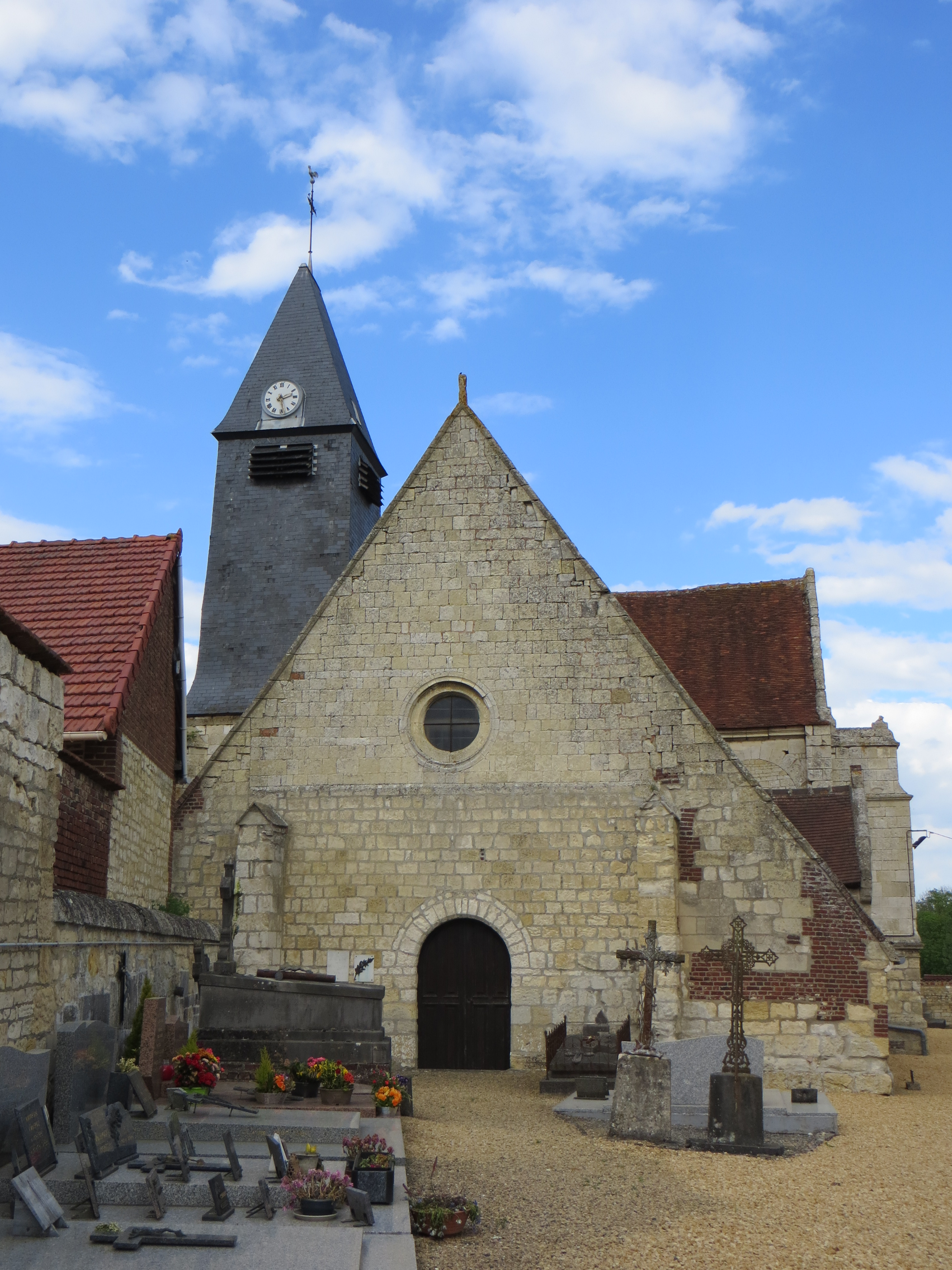
- The church in Montiers

- Coat of arms
- Location of Montiers
- Location within France Location within Hauts-de-France
- Coordinates: 49°30′05″N 2°34′43″E
- Country: France
- Region: Hauts-de-France
- Department: Oise
- Arrondissement: Clermont
- Canton: Estrées-Saint-Denis
- Intercommunality: Plateau Picard

Government
  - Mayor (2020–2026): Xavier Deneufbourg
- Area^{1}: 7.89 km^{2} (3.05 sq mi)
- Elevation: 105 m (344 ft)
- Highest elevation: 131 m (430 ft)
- Lowest elevation: 62 m (203 ft)
- Population (2023): 392
  - Density: 49.7/km^{2} (129/sq mi)
- Time zone: UTC+01:00 (CET)
  - Summer (DST): UTC+02:00 (CEST)
- INSEE/Postal code: 60418 /60190
- ^{1} French Land Register data, which excludes lakes, ponds, glaciers > 1 km^{2} (0.386 sq mi or 247 acres) and river estuaries.

Montiers (French pronunciation: [mɔ̃tje]) is a commune in the Oise department in northern France.

== See also ==
- Communes of the Oise department
