= Houdancourt =

- Commune
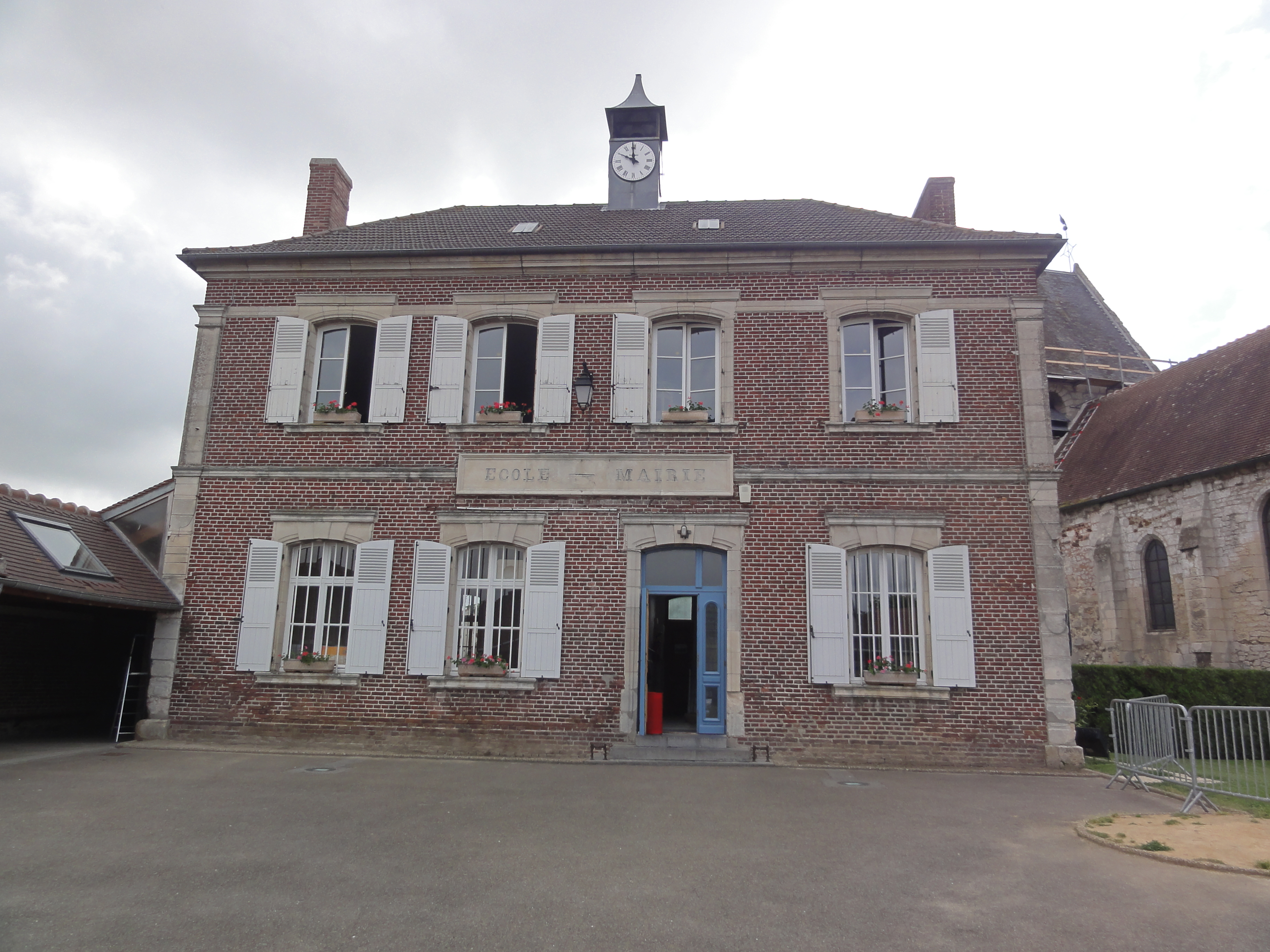
- The town hall and school in Houdancourt
- Location of Houdancourt
- Location within France Location within Hauts-de-France
- Coordinates: 49°20′38″N 2°38′30″E
- Country: France
- Region: Hauts-de-France
- Department: Oise
- Arrondissement: Compiègne
- Canton: Estrées-Saint-Denis
- Intercommunality: Plaine d'Estrées

Government
  - Mayor (2020–2026): Jean-Claude Portenart
- Area^{1}: 6.71 km^{2} (2.59 sq mi)
- Elevation: 82 m (269 ft)
- Highest elevation: 61 m (200 ft)
- Lowest elevation: 28 m (92 ft)
- Population (2023): 680
  - Density: 100/km^{2} (260/sq mi)
- Time zone: UTC+01:00 (CET)
  - Summer (DST): UTC+02:00 (CEST)
- INSEE/Postal code: 60318 /60710
- ^{1} French Land Register data, which excludes lakes, ponds, glaciers > 1 km^{2} (0.386 sq mi or 247 acres) and river estuaries.

Houdancourt (French pronunciation: [udɑ̃kuʁ]) is a commune in the Oise department in northern France.

== See also ==
- Communes of the Oise department
