= Corolis =

Public transport operator in northern France

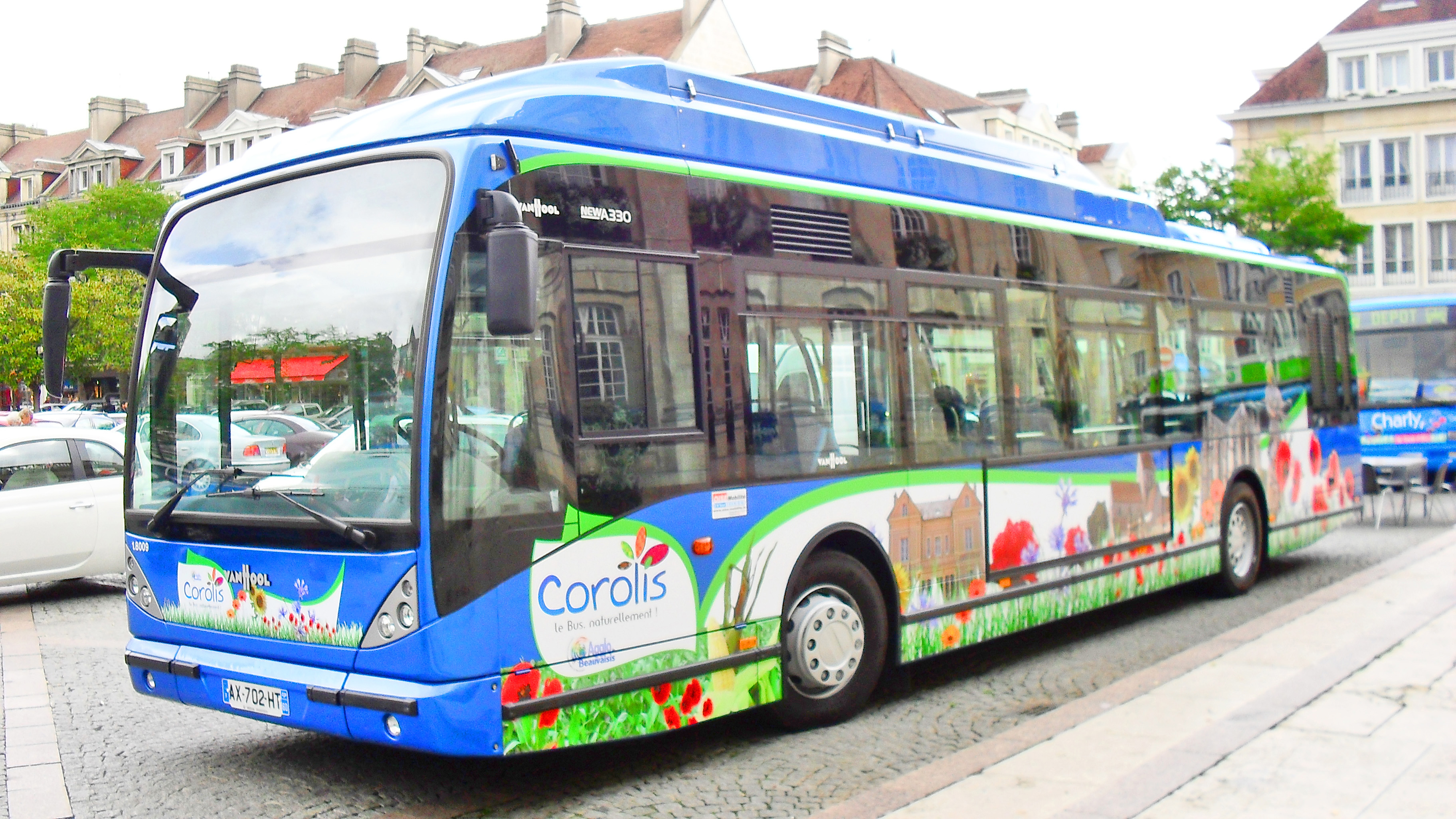
- Parent: Communauté d'agglomération du Beauvaisis
- Founded: 2010; 15 years ago
- Headquarters: 47 rue Corréus
- Locale: Beauvais, France
- Service area: Beauvais, France
- Service type: Transit bus
- Alliance: CABARO, CAP
- Routes: 26 (April 2014)
- Fleet: 40 vehicles
- Fuel type: CNG, Hybrid electric Diesel
- Operator: Veolia Transport
- Chief executive: Jean-Luc Bourgeois

Corolis (formerly Transports Urbains du Beauvaisis, abbreviated to TUB) is the local public transport operator in the town Beauvais and its suburbs, in northern France, that opened on 2010.

== Organization ==
- The Communauté d'agglomération du Beauvaisis defines the offer of transport (lines, frequency of passing ...), defines tariff policy, supports the large investment and management control of the operator.
- CABARO advises and informs the community of agglomeration, manages the network, ensure its smooth operation and implement all the elements that may contribute to the development and use of public transport: training staff, quality, trade policy, general studies.

=== Intercommunity ===
The Communauté d'agglomeration du Beauvaisis, which includes 31 municipalities, is served by Corolis.

Beauvais; Villers Saint-Lucien; Plouy Saint-Lucien; Verderel-lès-Sauqueuse; Maisoncelle-Saint-Pierre; Fontaine-Saint-Lucien; Guignecourt; Tillé; Bonlier; Nivillers	Morlaine; Warluis; Villers-sur-Thère; Allonne; Bongenoult; Milly-sur-Thérain; Herchies; Campdeville; Troissereux; Fouquenies	Rochy-Condé; Therdonne; Wagicourt; Pierrefitte-en-Beauvaisis; Hameau-le-Monchel; Savignies; Saint-Germain-la-Poterie; Le-Becquet; Saint-Paul; Le Mont-Saint-Adrien	Les Vivrots; Vaux; Berneuil-en-Bray; Auteuil; Saint-Quentin; Vessencourt; Frocourt; Saint-Martin-le-Nœud; Auneuil; Tiersfontaine	Auneuil; Neuville-sur-Auneuil; Friancourt; Sinancourt; Saint-Léger-en-Bray; Rainvillers; Aux-Marais; Goincourt

== Fleet ==
Corolis fleet consists of more than 40 vehicles, including: Renault Agora, Renault R312 and Irisbus Citelis GNV
