= Cambronne =

Cambronne may refer to:

== People ==
- Arnouph Deshayes de Cambronne (1768–1846), adjudant of the Château de Compiègne
- Claude de Cambronne (1905–1993), aircraft manufacturer
- Laurence de Cambronne (born 1951), French journalist and writer
- Luckner Cambronne (1930–2006), high-ranking political figure in François Duvalier's regime in Haiti
- Pierre Cambronne (1770–1842), general of the French Empire

== Places ==
France

- Cambronne station, an elevated Paris Metro station
- Cambronne-lès-Clermont, commune in the Oise department in northern France
- Cambronne-lès-Ribécourt, commune in the Oise department in northern France
