= Bailleul-sur-Thérain =

- Commune
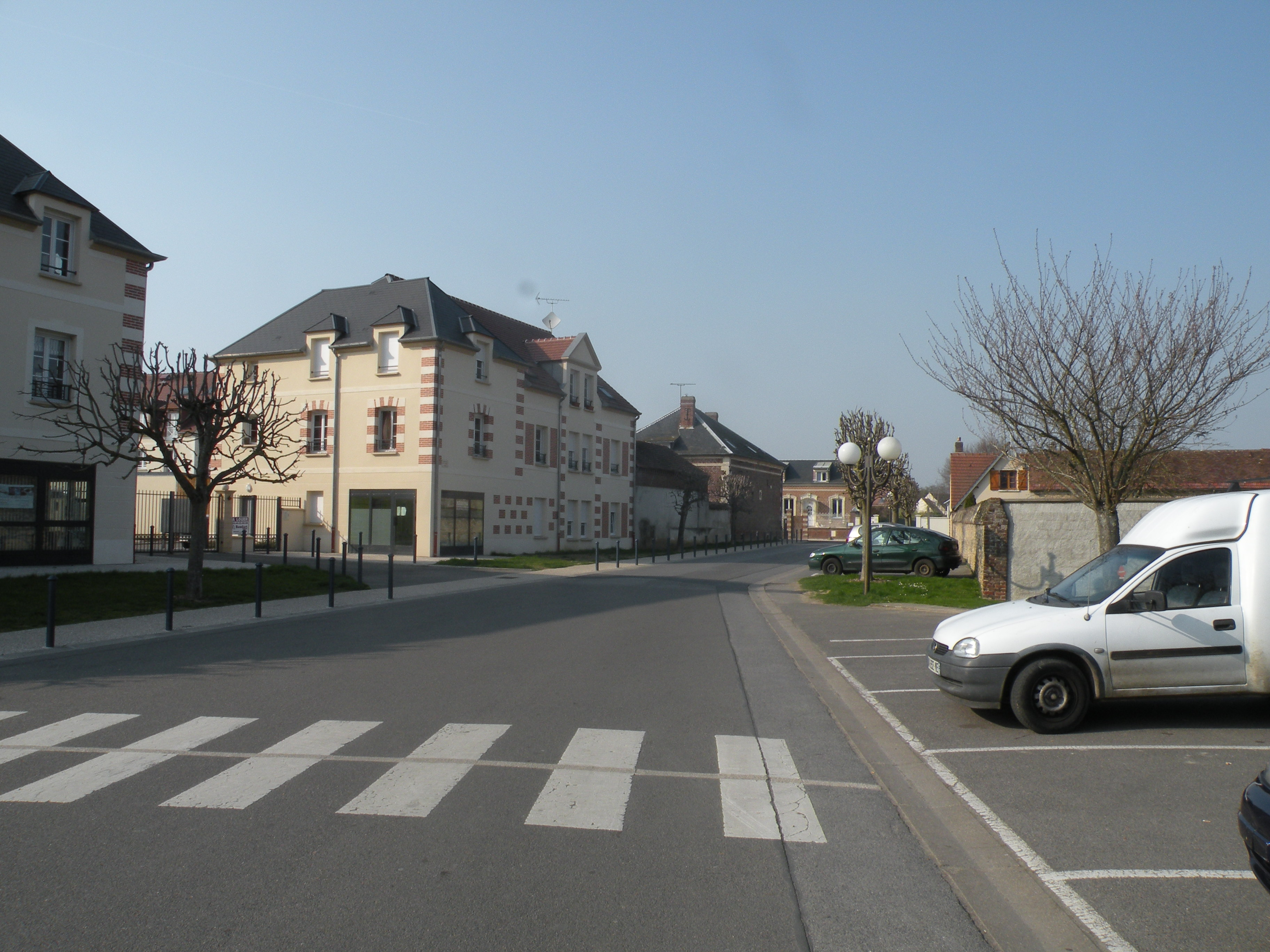
- Place Maurice-Segonds in Bailleul-sur-Thérain
- Location of Bailleul-sur-Thérain
- Location within France Location within Hauts-de-France
- Coordinates: 49°23′10″N 2°13′22″E
- Country: France
- Region: Hauts-de-France
- Department: Oise
- Arrondissement: Beauvais
- Canton: Mouy
- Intercommunality: CA Beauvaisis

Government
  - Mayor (2020–2026): Béatrice Lejeune
- Area^{1}: 9.5 km^{2} (3.7 sq mi)
- Elevation: 59 m (194 ft)
- Highest elevation: 138 m (453 ft)
- Lowest elevation: 46 m (151 ft)
- Population (2023): 2,330
  - Density: 250/km^{2} (640/sq mi)
- Time zone: UTC+01:00 (CET)
  - Summer (DST): UTC+02:00 (CEST)
- INSEE/Postal code: 60041 /60930
- ^{1} French Land Register data, which excludes lakes, ponds, glaciers > 1 km^{2} (0.386 sq mi or 247 acres) and river estuaries.

Bailleul-sur-Thérain (French pronunciation: [bajœl syʁ teʁɛ̃], literally Bailleul on Thérain) is a commune in the Oise department in northern France.

== Population ==
Historical population

Year	Pop.	±% p.a.
1793	737	—
1821	707	−0.15%
1846	665	−0.24%
1872	709	+0.25%
1901	717	+0.04%
1926	680	−0.21%
1946	676	−0.03%
1962	927	+1.99%
1968	1,150	+3.66%

Year	Pop.	±% p.a.
1975	1,212	+0.75%
1982	1,523	+3.32%
1990	1,567	+0.36%
1999	1,753	+1.25%
2007	2,150	+2.58%
2012	2,075	−0.71%
2017	2,175	+0.95%
2023	2,330	+1.15%

Source: EHESS and INSEE (1968–2023)

== See also ==
- Communes of the Oise department
