= Angy, Oise =

Angy
- Commune
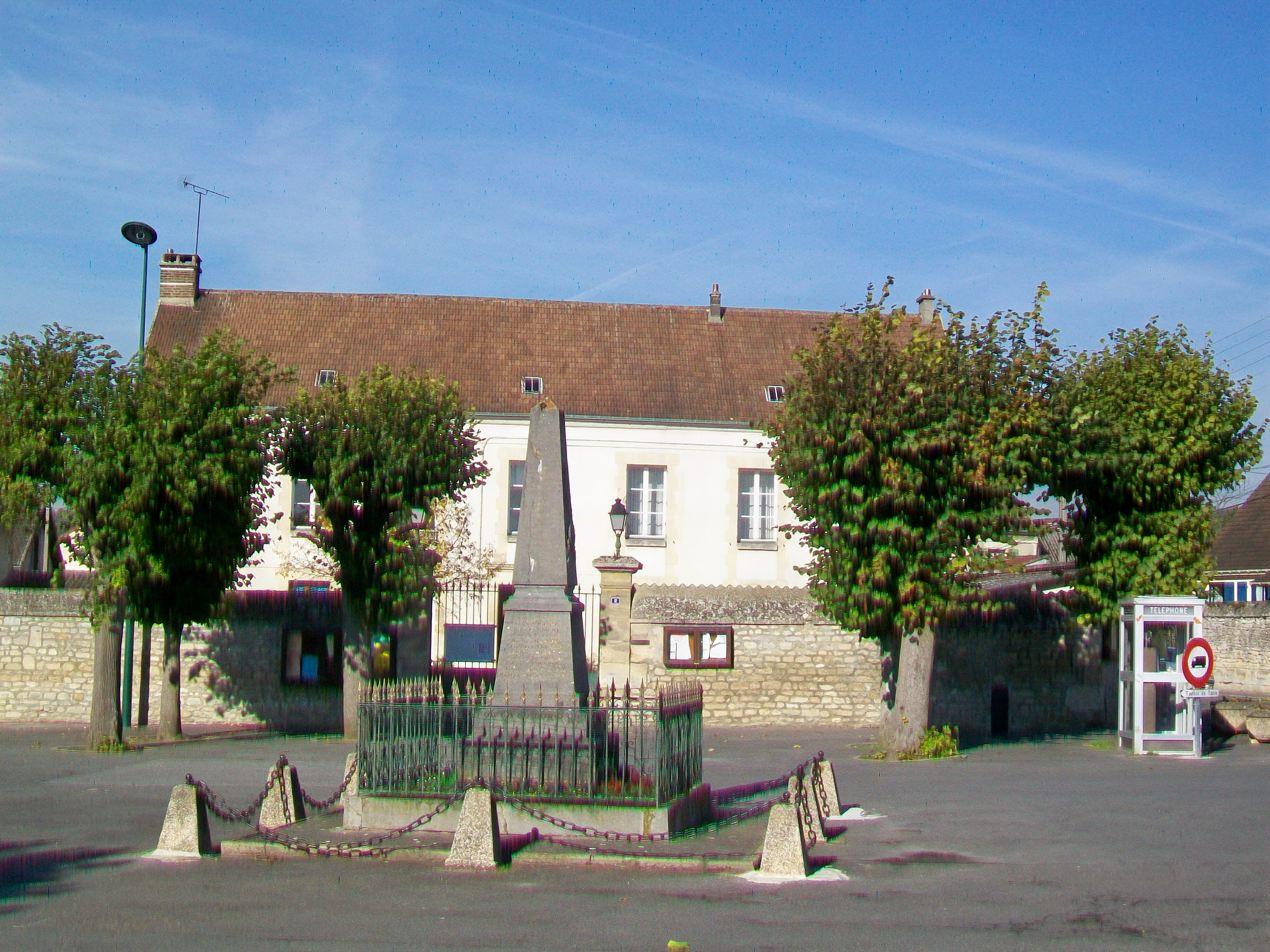
- The town hall and war memorial in Angy

- Coat of arms
- Location of Angy
- Location within France Location within Hauts-de-France
- Coordinates: 49°19′48″N 2°19′44″E
- Country: France
- Region: Hauts-de-France
- Department: Oise
- Arrondissement: Clermont
- Canton: Mouy
- Intercommunality: Thelloise

Government
  - Mayor (2020–2026): Patrice Crépy
- Area^{1}: 3.6 km^{2} (1.4 sq mi)
- Elevation: 42 m (138 ft)
- Highest elevation: 130 m (430 ft)
- Lowest elevation: 37 m (121 ft)
- Population (2023): 1,124
  - Density: 310/km^{2} (810/sq mi)
- Time zone: UTC+01:00 (CET)
  - Summer (DST): UTC+02:00 (CEST)
- INSEE/Postal code: 60015 /60250
- ^{1} French Land Register data, which excludes lakes, ponds, glaciers > 1 km^{2} (0.386 sq mi or 247 acres) and river estuaries.

Angy (French pronunciation: [ɑ̃ʒi]) is a commune in the Oise department in northern France.

== Population ==
Historical population
Year	Pop.	±% p.a.
1968	776	—
1975	974	+3.30%
1982	1,024	+0.72%
1990	1,153	+1.49%
1999	1,186	+0.31%
2007	1,196	+0.11%
2012	1,194	−0.03%
2017	1,172	−0.37%
2023	1,124	−0.69%
Source: INSEE

== See also ==
- Communes of the Oise department
