= Lachaussée-du-Bois-d'Écu =

- Commune
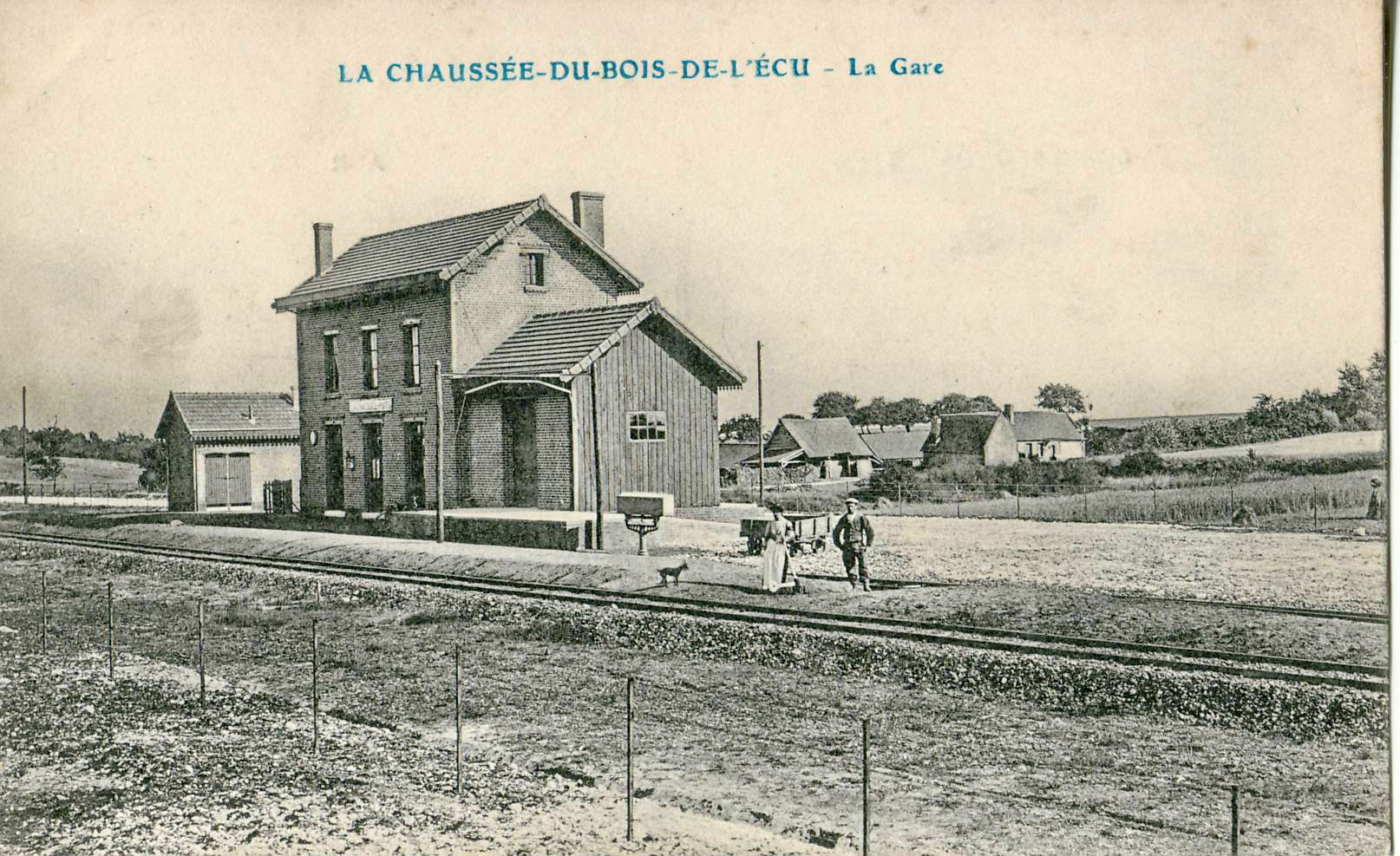
- The railway station in Lachaussée-du-Bois-d'Écu in the early 20th century
- Location of Lachaussée-du-Bois-d'Écu
- Location within France Location within Hauts-de-France
- Coordinates: 49°33′35″N 2°10′27″E
- Country: France
- Region: Hauts-de-France
- Department: Oise
- Arrondissement: Beauvais
- Canton: Saint-Just-en-Chaussée
- Intercommunality: CA Beauvaisis

Government
  - Mayor (2020–2026): Bruno Gruel
- Area^{1}: 5.92 km^{2} (2.29 sq mi)
- Elevation: 155 m (509 ft)
- Highest elevation: 172 m (564 ft)
- Lowest elevation: 142 m (466 ft)
- Population (2023): 182
  - Density: 30.7/km^{2} (79.6/sq mi)
- Time zone: UTC+01:00 (CET)
  - Summer (DST): UTC+02:00 (CEST)
- INSEE/Postal code: 60336 /60480
- ^{1} French Land Register data, which excludes lakes, ponds, glaciers > 1 km^{2} (0.386 sq mi or 247 acres) and river estuaries.

Lachaussée-du-Bois-d'Écu (French pronunciation: [laʃose dy bwa deky]) is a commune in the Oise department in northern France.

== See also ==
- Communes of the Oise department
