= Fouquerolles =

- Commune
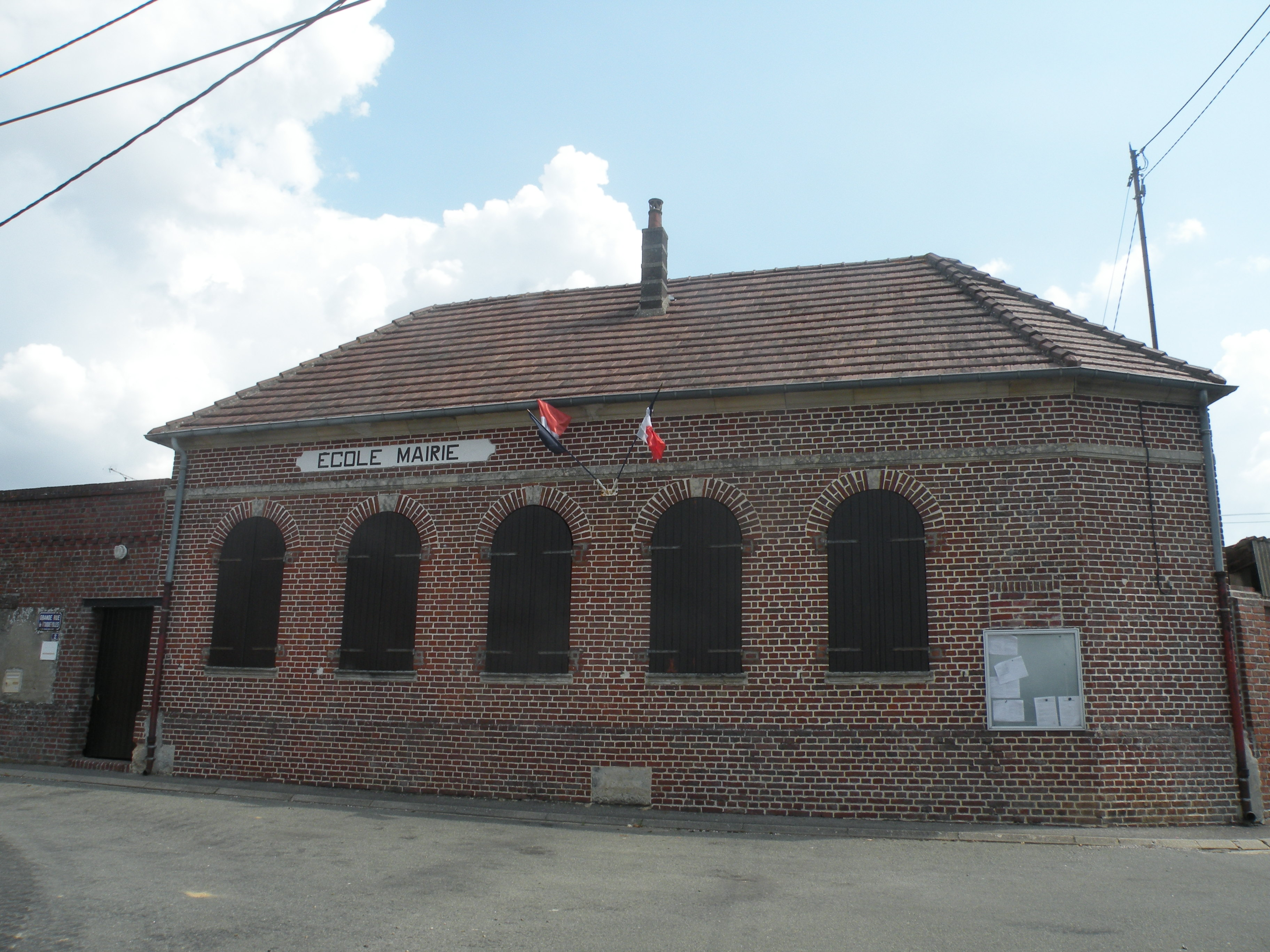
- The town hall in Fouquerolles
- Location of Fouquerolles
- Location within France Location within Hauts-de-France
- Coordinates: 49°27′25″N 2°12′57″E
- Country: France
- Region: Hauts-de-France
- Department: Oise
- Arrondissement: Beauvais
- Canton: Mouy
- Intercommunality: CA Beauvaisis

Government
  - Mayor (2020–2026): Philippe Van Walleghem
- Area^{1}: 10.21 km^{2} (3.94 sq mi)
- Elevation: 120 m (390 ft)
- Highest elevation: 132 m (433 ft)
- Lowest elevation: 84 m (276 ft)
- Population (2023): 305
  - Density: 29.9/km^{2} (77.4/sq mi)
- Time zone: UTC+01:00 (CET)
  - Summer (DST): UTC+02:00 (CEST)
- INSEE/Postal code: 60251 /60510
- ^{1} French Land Register data, which excludes lakes, ponds, glaciers > 1 km^{2} (0.386 sq mi or 247 acres) and river estuaries.

Fouquerolles (French pronunciation: [fukʁɔl]) is a commune in the Oise department in northern France.

== See also ==
- Communes of the Oise department
