= Francastel =

- Commune
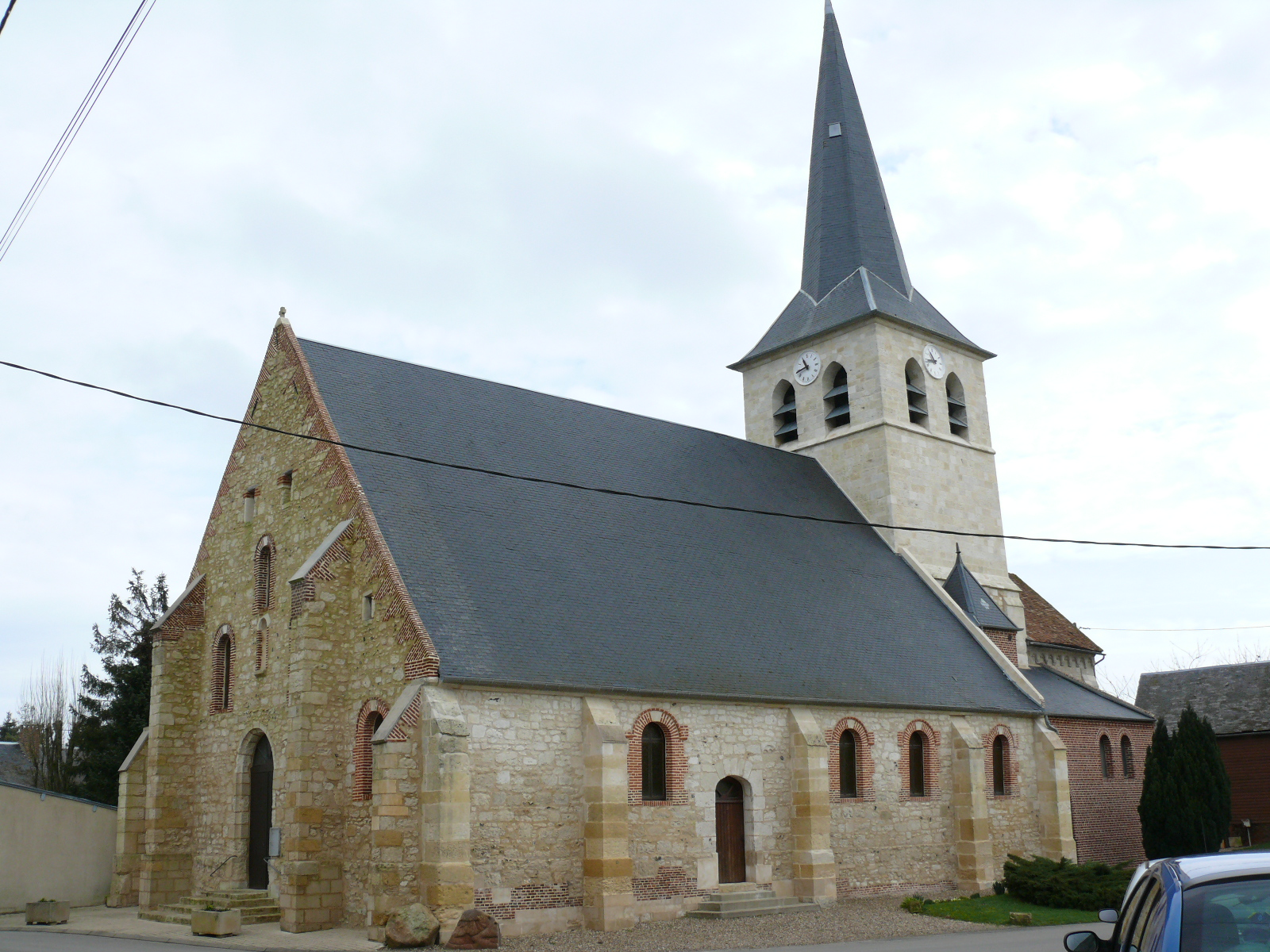
- The church in Francastel
- Location of Francastel
- Location within France Location within Hauts-de-France
- Coordinates: 49°35′23″N 2°09′01″E
- Country: France
- Region: Hauts-de-France
- Department: Oise
- Arrondissement: Beauvais
- Canton: Saint-Just-en-Chaussée
- Intercommunality: CA Beauvaisis

Government
  - Mayor (2020–2026): Hubert Vanysacker
- Area^{1}: 12.58 km^{2} (4.86 sq mi)
- Elevation: 180 m (590 ft)
- Highest elevation: 186 m (610 ft)
- Lowest elevation: 160 m (520 ft)
- Population (2023): 497
  - Density: 39.5/km^{2} (102/sq mi)
- Time zone: UTC+01:00 (CET)
  - Summer (DST): UTC+02:00 (CEST)
- INSEE/Postal code: 60253 /60480
- ^{1} French Land Register data, which excludes lakes, ponds, glaciers > 1 km^{2} (0.386 sq mi or 247 acres) and river estuaries.

Francastel (French pronunciation: [fʁɑ̃kastɛl]) is a commune in the Oise department in northern France.

Francastel is on a plateau of farmland in Hauts-de-France, between Crevecoeur-le-Grand and Froissy on the road 151, and north of Beauvais. It is accessible from the intersection 16 of the A16 motorway.

The first village, which was at the location of the current cemetery, was destroyed by the Normans. Rebuilt on the site it occupies today, following the Jacquerie damage, prior to being attacked by the Burgundians who destroyed the castle in 1472.

The village was served by the railway linking Estrees - Saint-Denis - Froissy - Crevecoeur-le-Grand from 1911 to 1961.

== See also ==
- Communes of the Oise department
