= Maulers, Oise =

Maulers
- Commune
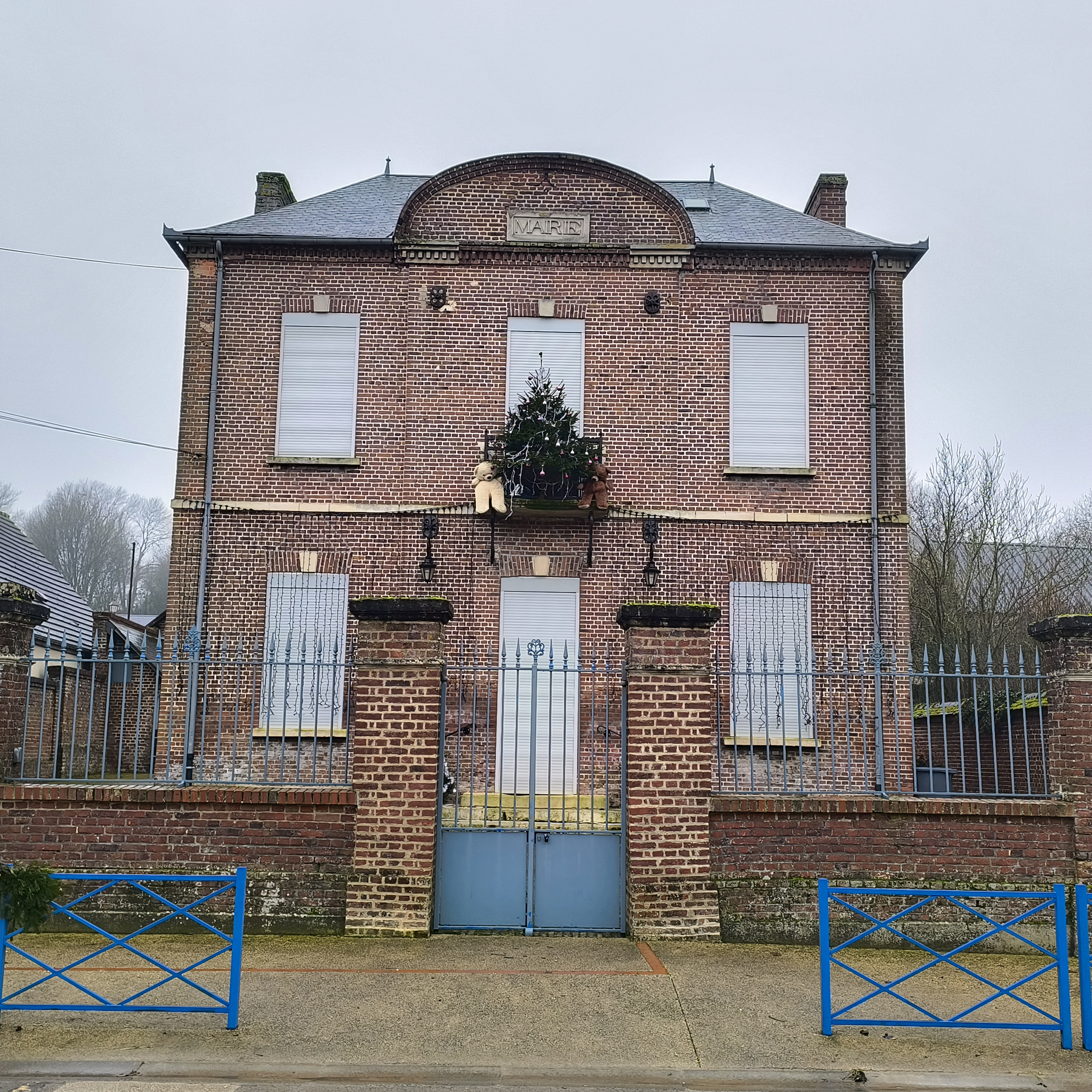
- Maulers Town hall
- Location of Maulers
- Location within France Location within Hauts-de-France
- Coordinates: 49°32′54″N 2°10′04″E
- Country: France
- Region: Hauts-de-France
- Department: Oise
- Arrondissement: Beauvais
- Canton: Saint-Just-en-Chaussée
- Intercommunality: CA Beauvaisis

Government
  - Mayor (2020–2026): Jean-Pierre Sénéchal
- Area^{1}: 7.62 km^{2} (2.94 sq mi)
- Elevation: 160 m (520 ft)
- Highest elevation: 167 m (548 ft)
- Lowest elevation: 120 m (390 ft)
- Population (2023): 344
  - Density: 45.1/km^{2} (117/sq mi)
- Time zone: UTC+01:00 (CET)
  - Summer (DST): UTC+02:00 (CEST)
- INSEE/Postal code: 60390 /60480
- ^{1} French Land Register data, which excludes lakes, ponds, glaciers > 1 km^{2} (0.386 sq mi or 247 acres) and river estuaries.

Maulers is a commune in the Oise department in northern France.

== See also ==
- Communes of the Oise department
