= Laversines =

- Commune
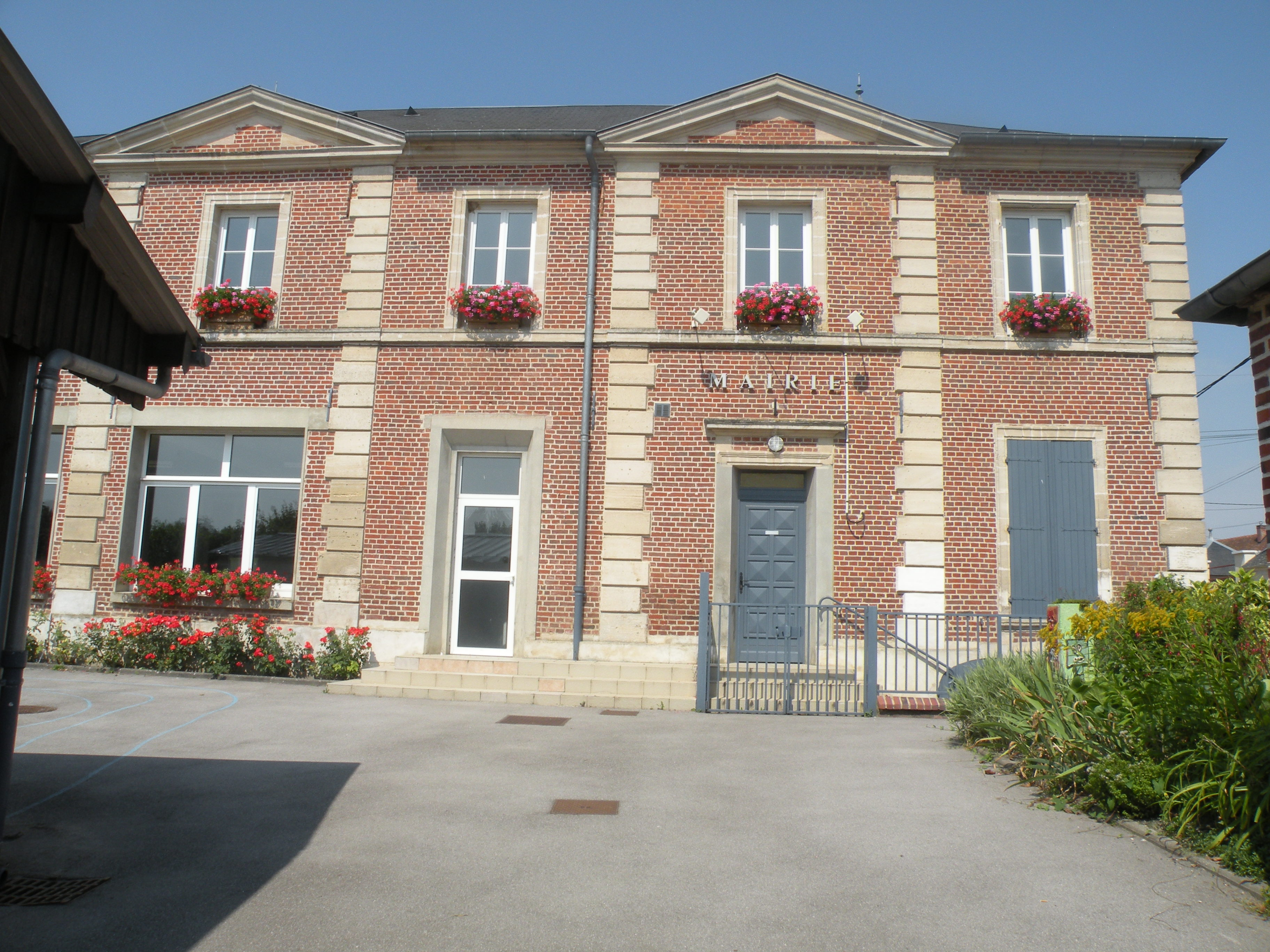
- Town hall
- Location of Laversines
- Location within France Location within Hauts-de-France
- Coordinates: 49°25′33″N 2°11′53″E
- Country: France
- Region: Hauts-de-France
- Department: Oise
- Arrondissement: Beauvais
- Canton: Mouy
- Intercommunality: CA Beauvaisis

Government
  - Mayor (2020–2026): Marie-Manuelle Jacques
- Area^{1}: 9.79 km^{2} (3.78 sq mi)
- Elevation: 75 m (246 ft)
- Highest elevation: 149 m (489 ft)
- Lowest elevation: 113 m (371 ft)
- Population (2023): 1,116
  - Density: 114/km^{2} (295/sq mi)
- Time zone: UTC+01:00 (CET)
  - Summer (DST): UTC+02:00 (CEST)
- INSEE/Postal code: 60355 /60510
- ^{1} French Land Register data, which excludes lakes, ponds, glaciers > 1 km^{2} (0.386 sq mi or 247 acres) and river estuaries.

Laversines (French pronunciation: [lavɛʁsin]) is a commune in the Oise department in northern France.

== See also ==
- Communes of the Oise department
