= Neuilly-sous-Clermont =

- Commune
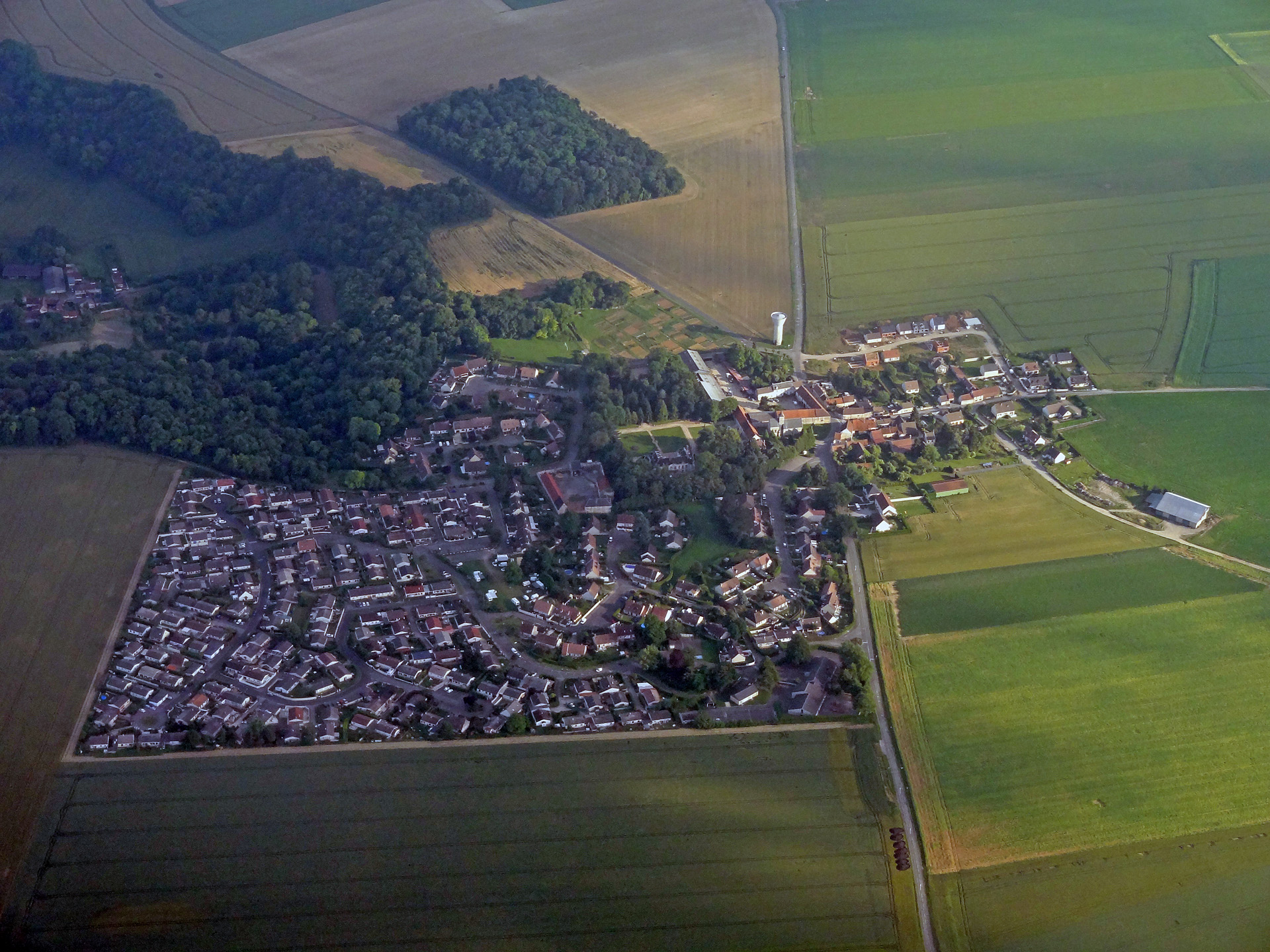
- An aerial view of Auvillers in Neuilly-sous-Clermont
- Location of Neuilly-sous-Clermont
- Location within France Location within Hauts-de-France
- Coordinates: 49°20′45″N 2°24′44″E
- Country: France
- Region: Hauts-de-France
- Department: Oise
- Arrondissement: Clermont
- Canton: Mouy
- Intercommunality: Clermontois

Government
  - Mayor (2020–2026): Christophe Chemin
- Area^{1}: 7.74 km^{2} (2.99 sq mi)
- Elevation: 75 m (246 ft)
- Highest elevation: 160 m (520 ft)
- Lowest elevation: 49 m (161 ft)
- Population (2023): 1,571
  - Density: 203/km^{2} (526/sq mi)
- Time zone: UTC+01:00 (CET)
  - Summer (DST): UTC+02:00 (CEST)
- INSEE/Postal code: 60451 /60290
- ^{1} French Land Register data, which excludes lakes, ponds, glaciers > 1 km^{2} (0.386 sq mi or 247 acres) and river estuaries.

Neuilly-sous-Clermont (French pronunciation: [nœji su klɛʁmɔ̃], literally Neuilly under Clermont) is a commune in the Oise department in northern France.

== See also ==
- Communes of the Oise department
