= Oroër =

- Commune
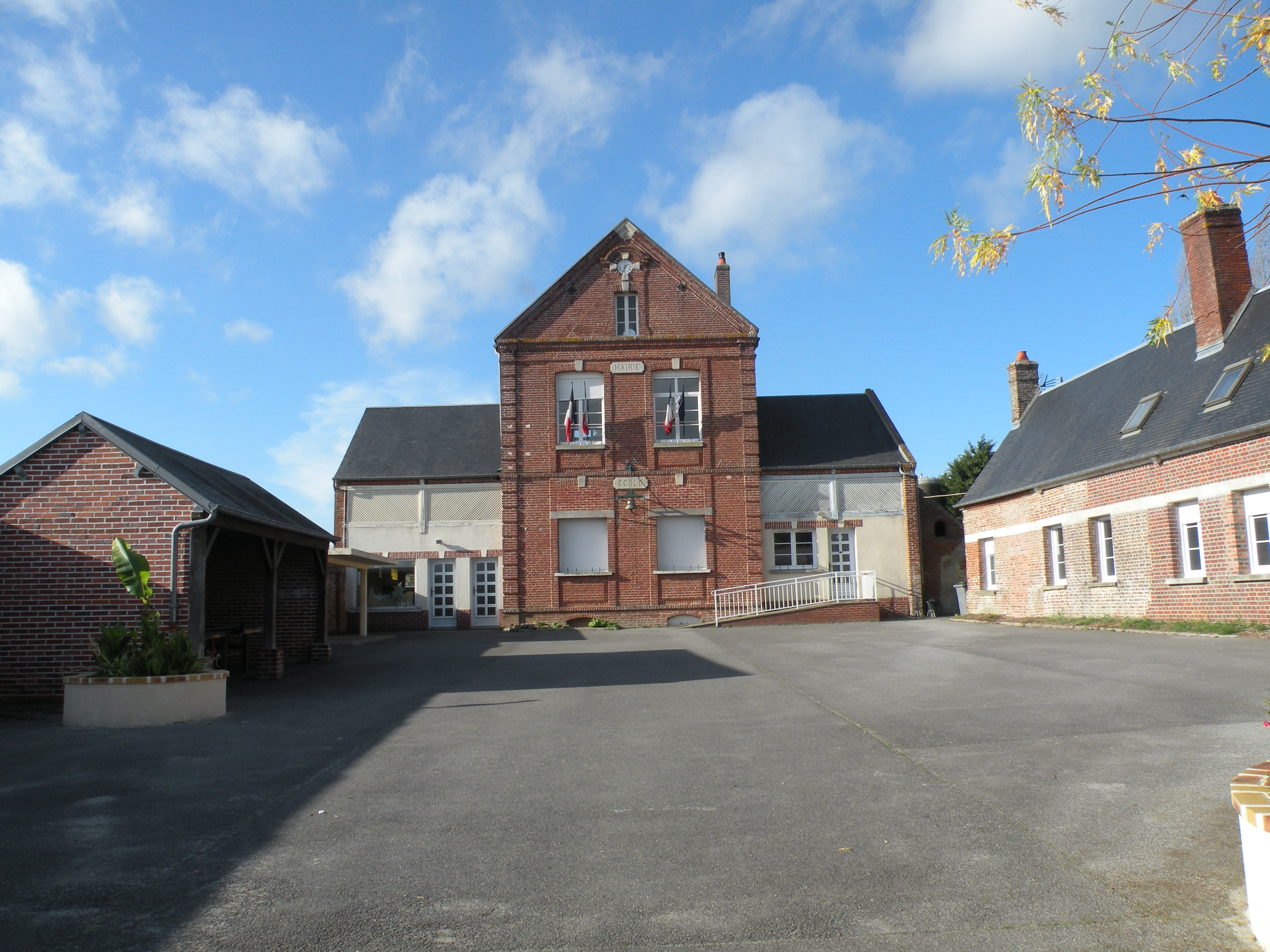
- The town hall in Oroër
- Location of Oroër
- Location within France Location within Hauts-de-France
- Coordinates: 49°29′30″N 2°10′49″E
- Country: France
- Region: Hauts-de-France
- Department: Oise
- Arrondissement: Beauvais
- Canton: Mouy
- Intercommunality: Oise Picarde

Government
  - Mayor (2020–2026): Arlette Devaux
- Area^{1}: 9.06 km^{2} (3.50 sq mi)
- Elevation: 146 m (479 ft)
- Highest elevation: 153 m (502 ft)
- Lowest elevation: 119 m (390 ft)
- Population (2023): 537
  - Density: 59.3/km^{2} (154/sq mi)
- Time zone: UTC+01:00 (CET)
  - Summer (DST): UTC+02:00 (CEST)
- INSEE/Postal code: 60480 /60510
- ^{1} French Land Register data, which excludes lakes, ponds, glaciers > 1 km^{2} (0.386 sq mi or 247 acres) and river estuaries.

Oroër (French pronunciation: [ɔʁɔɛʁ]) is a commune in the Oise department in northern France.

== See also ==
- Communes of the Oise department
