= Lafraye =

- Commune
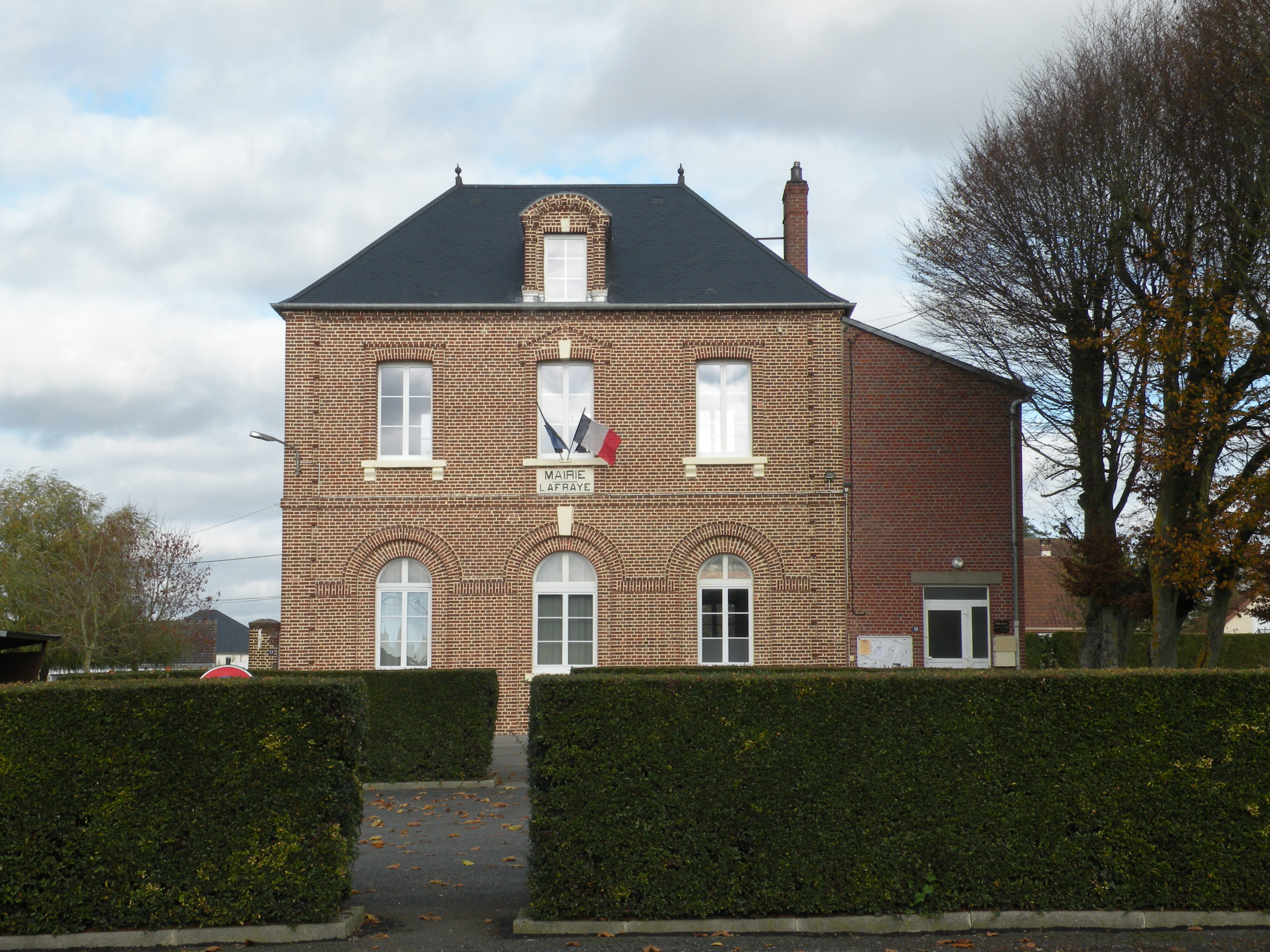
- The town hall in Lafraye
- Location of Lafraye
- Location within France Location within Hauts-de-France
- Coordinates: 49°29′45″N 2°12′42″E
- Country: France
- Region: Hauts-de-France
- Department: Oise
- Arrondissement: Beauvais
- Canton: Mouy
- Intercommunality: CA Beauvaisis

Government
  - Mayor (2020–2026): Marie-Claude Devillers
- Area^{1}: 5.53 km^{2} (2.14 sq mi)
- Highest elevation: 151 m (495 ft)
- Lowest elevation: 123 m (404 ft)
- Population (2023): 342
  - Density: 61.8/km^{2} (160/sq mi)
- Time zone: UTC+01:00 (CET)
  - Summer (DST): UTC+02:00 (CEST)
- INSEE/Postal code: 60339 /60510
- ^{1} French Land Register data, which excludes lakes, ponds, glaciers > 1 km^{2} (0.386 sq mi or 247 acres) and river estuaries.

Lafraye (French pronunciation: [lafʁɛ]) is a commune in the Oise department in northern France.

== See also ==
- Communes of the Oise department
