= Litz, Oise =

Litz
- Commune
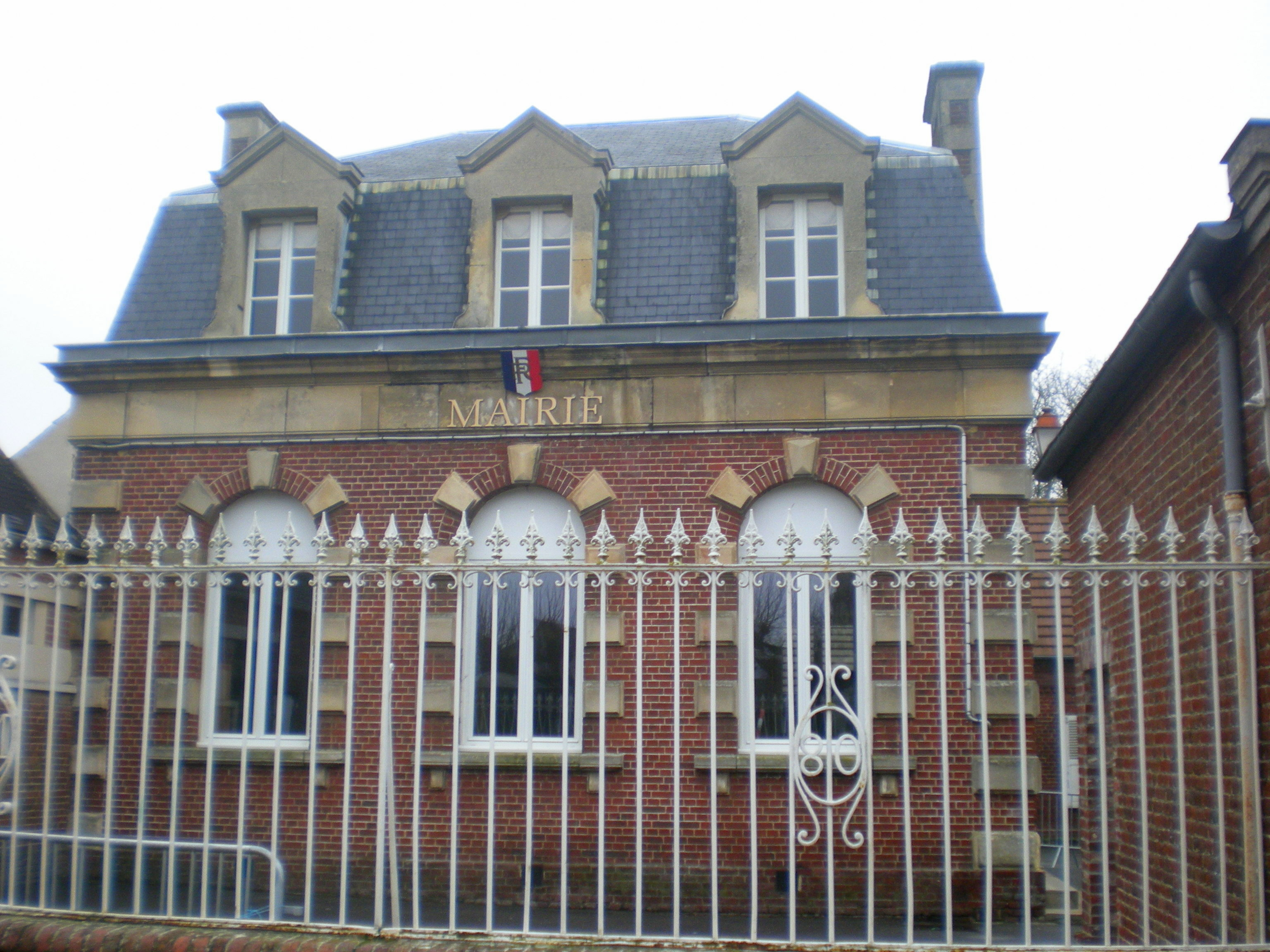
- The town hall in Litz

- Coat of arms
- Location of Litz
- Location within France Location within Hauts-de-France
- Coordinates: 49°25′02″N 2°19′57″E
- Country: France
- Region: Hauts-de-France
- Department: Oise
- Arrondissement: Clermont
- Canton: Mouy
- Intercommunality: CA Beauvaisis

Government
  - Mayor (2020–2026): Jean-Jacques Degouy
- Area^{1}: 9.76 km^{2} (3.77 sq mi)
- Elevation: 74 m (243 ft)
- Highest elevation: 109 m (358 ft)
- Lowest elevation: 66 m (217 ft)
- Population (2023): 359
  - Density: 36.8/km^{2} (95.3/sq mi)
- Time zone: UTC+01:00 (CET)
  - Summer (DST): UTC+02:00 (CEST)
- INSEE/Postal code: 60366 /60510
- ^{1} French Land Register data, which excludes lakes, ponds, glaciers > 1 km^{2} (0.386 sq mi or 247 acres) and river estuaries.

Litz is a commune in the Oise department in northern France.

== See also ==
- Communes of the Oise department
