= Juvignies =

- Commune
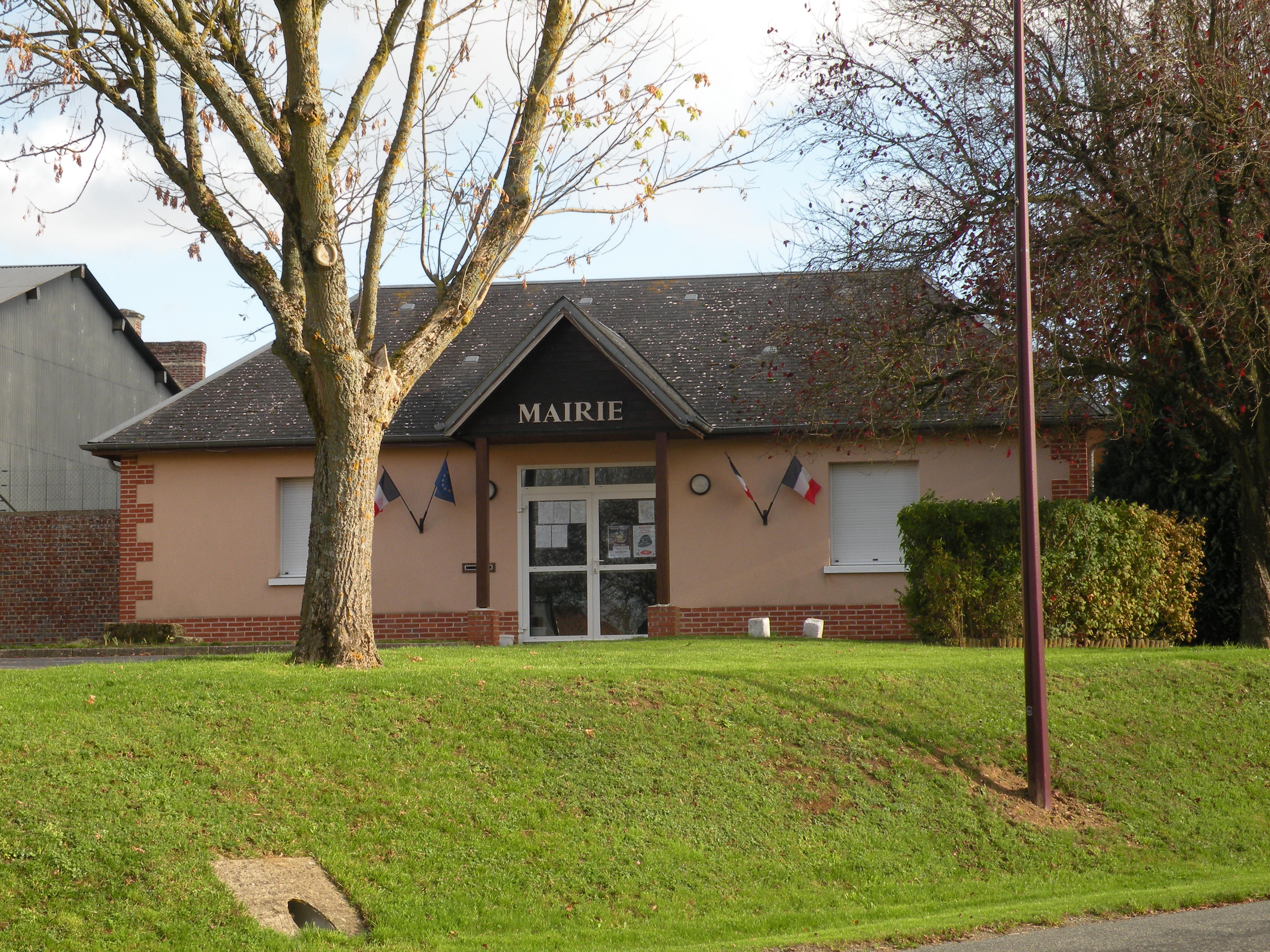
- The town hall in Juvignies
- Location of Juvignies
- Location within France Location within Hauts-de-France
- Coordinates: 49°31′12″N 2°05′14″E
- Country: France
- Region: Hauts-de-France
- Department: Oise
- Arrondissement: Beauvais
- Canton: Mouy
- Intercommunality: CA Beauvaisis

Government
  - Mayor (2020–2026): Dominique Devillers
- Area^{1}: 8.09 km^{2} (3.12 sq mi)
- Elevation: 120 m (390 ft)
- Highest elevation: 169 m (554 ft)
- Lowest elevation: 115 m (377 ft)
- Population (2023): 294
  - Density: 36.3/km^{2} (94.1/sq mi)
- Time zone: UTC+01:00 (CET)
  - Summer (DST): UTC+02:00 (CEST)
- INSEE/Postal code: 60328 /60112
- ^{1} French Land Register data, which excludes lakes, ponds, glaciers > 1 km^{2} (0.386 sq mi or 247 acres) and river estuaries.

Juvignies (French pronunciation: [ʒyviɲi]) is a commune in the Oise department in northern France.

== See also ==
- Communes of the Oise department
