= La Rue-Saint-Pierre, Oise =

La Rue-Saint-Pierre
- Commune
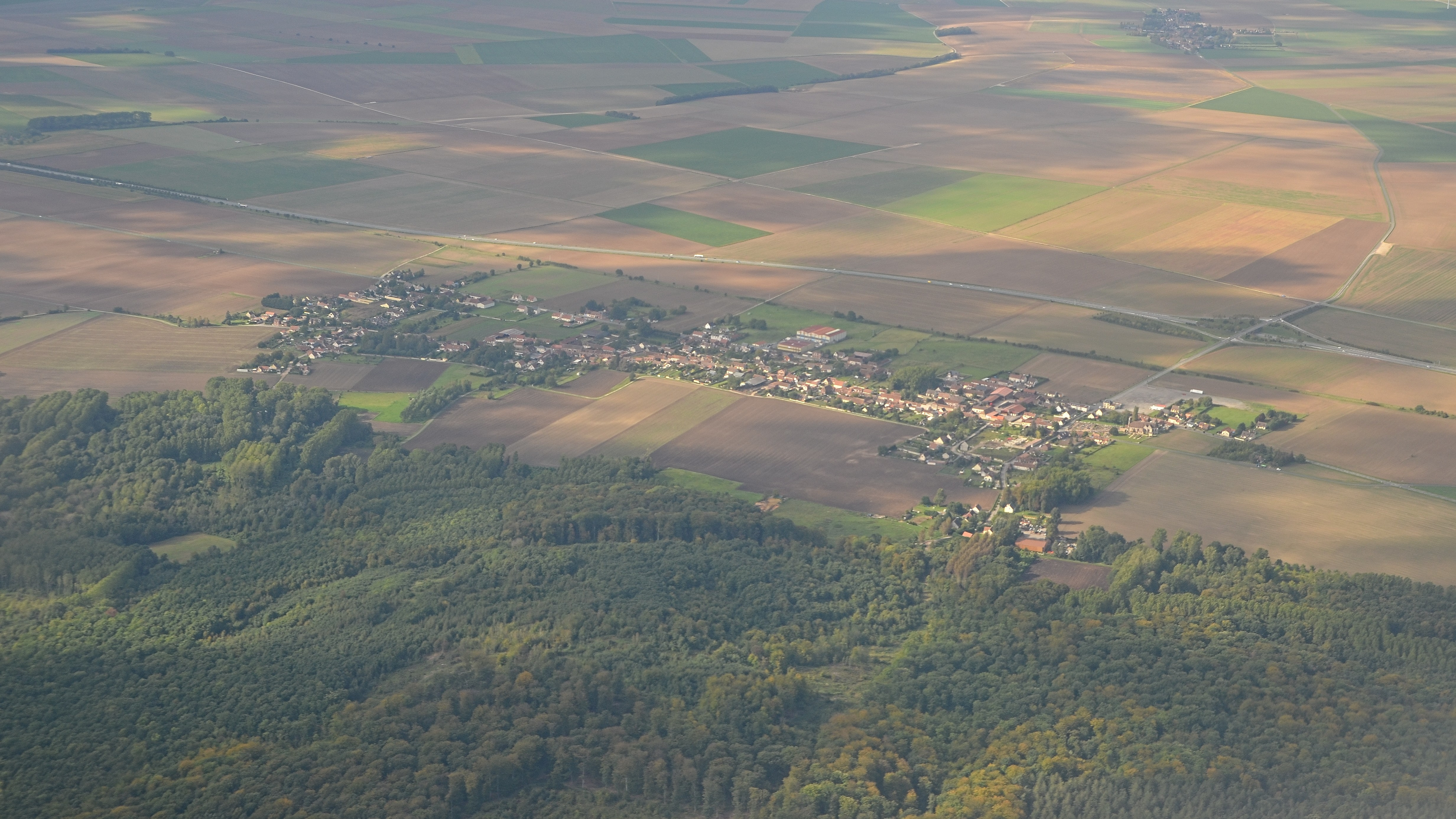
- An aerial view of La-Rue-Saint-Pierre
- Location of La Rue-Saint-Pierre
- Location within France Location within Hauts-de-France
- Coordinates: 49°24′36″N 2°17′48″E
- Country: France
- Region: Hauts-de-France
- Department: Oise
- Arrondissement: Clermont
- Canton: Mouy
- Intercommunality: CA Beauvaisis

Government
  - Mayor (2020–2026): Patrick Signoirt
- Area^{1}: 8.68 km^{2} (3.35 sq mi)
- Elevation: 63 m (207 ft)
- Highest elevation: 96 m (315 ft)
- Lowest elevation: 49 m (161 ft)
- Population (2023): 855
  - Density: 98.5/km^{2} (255/sq mi)
- Time zone: UTC+01:00 (CET)
  - Summer (DST): UTC+02:00 (CEST)
- INSEE/Postal code: 60559 /60510
- ^{1} French Land Register data, which excludes lakes, ponds, glaciers > 1 km^{2} (0.386 sq mi or 247 acres) and river estuaries.

La Rue-Saint-Pierre (French pronunciation: [la ʁy sɛ̃ pjɛʁ]) is a commune in the Oise department in northern France.

== See also ==
- Communes of the Oise department
