= Saint-Félix, Oise =

Saint-Félix
- Commune
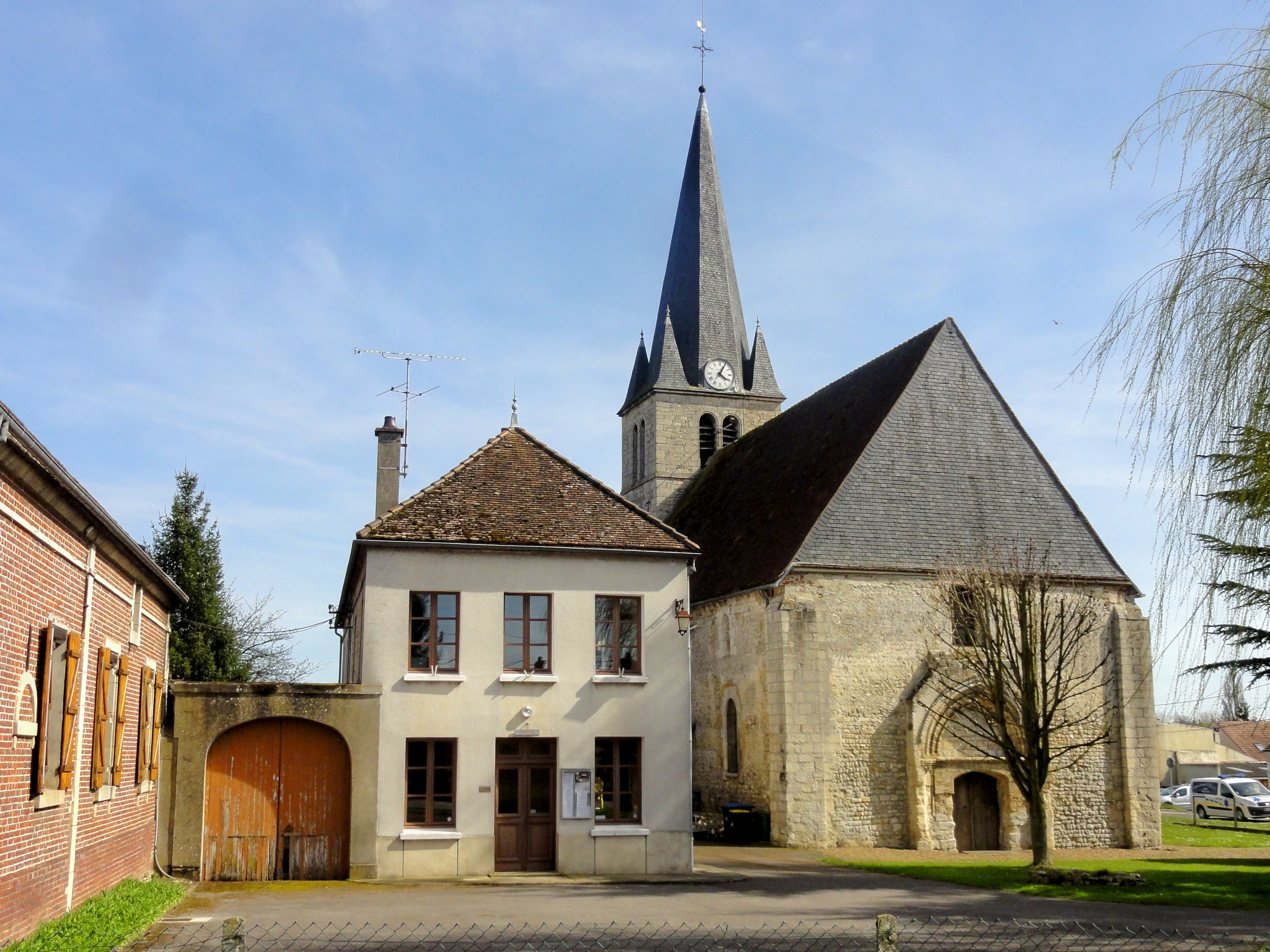
- The town hall and church in Saint-Félix
- Location of Saint-Félix
- Location within France Location within Hauts-de-France
- Coordinates: 49°20′55″N 2°17′11″E
- Country: France
- Region: Hauts-de-France
- Department: Oise
- Arrondissement: Clermont
- Canton: Mouy
- Intercommunality: CC Thelloise

Government
  - Mayor (2020–2026): Patrick Vonthron
- Area^{1}: 5.13 km^{2} (1.98 sq mi)
- Elevation: 100 m (330 ft)
- Highest elevation: 140 m (460 ft)
- Lowest elevation: 42 m (138 ft)
- Population (2023): 618
  - Density: 120/km^{2} (312/sq mi)
- Time zone: UTC+01:00 (CET)
  - Summer (DST): UTC+02:00 (CEST)
- INSEE/Postal code: 60574 /60370
- ^{1} French Land Register data, which excludes lakes, ponds, glaciers > 1 km^{2} (0.386 sq mi or 247 acres) and river estuaries.

Saint-Félix (French pronunciation: [sɛ̃ feliks]) is a commune in the Oise department in northern France.

== See also ==
- Communes of the Oise department
