= Le Fay-Saint-Quentin =

- Commune
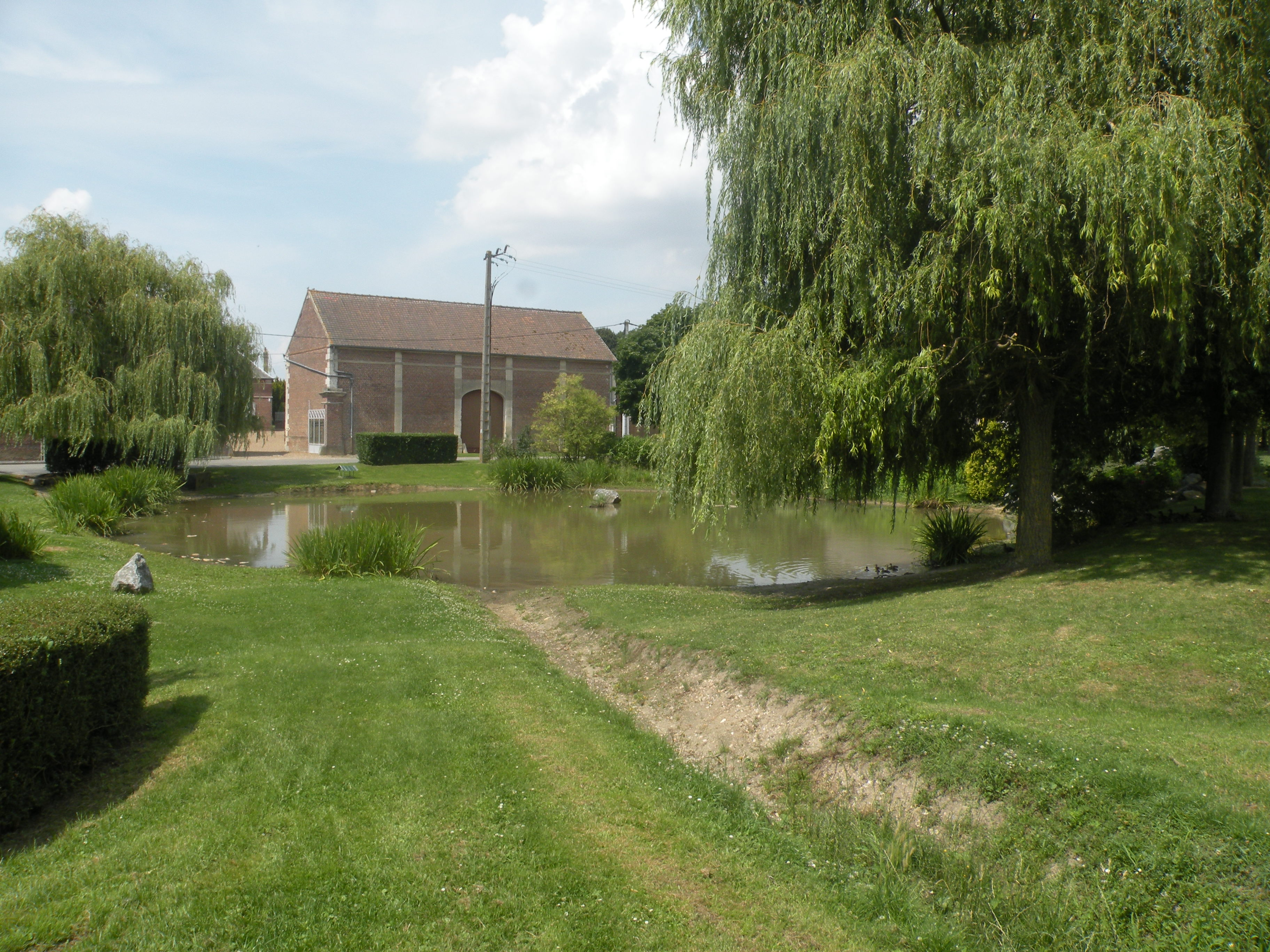
- The village hall and lake

- Coat of arms
- Location of Le Fay-Saint-Quentin
- Location within France Location within Hauts-de-France
- Coordinates: 49°27′06″N 2°15′07″E
- Country: France
- Region: Hauts-de-France
- Department: Oise
- Arrondissement: Beauvais
- Canton: Mouy
- Intercommunality: CA Beauvaisis

Government
  - Mayor (2020–2026): Christiane Hermand
- Area^{1}: 7.19 km^{2} (2.78 sq mi)
- Elevation: 110 m (360 ft)
- Highest elevation: 123 m (404 ft)
- Lowest elevation: 86 m (282 ft)
- Population (2023): 531
  - Density: 73.9/km^{2} (191/sq mi)
- Time zone: UTC+01:00 (CET)
  - Summer (DST): UTC+02:00 (CEST)
- INSEE/Postal code: 60230 /60510
- ^{1} French Land Register data, which excludes lakes, ponds, glaciers > 1 km^{2} (0.386 sq mi or 247 acres) and river estuaries.

Le Fay-Saint-Quentin (French pronunciation: [lə fɛ sɛ̃ kɑ̃tɛ̃]) is a commune in the Oise department in northern France.

== See also ==
- Communes of the Oise department
