= Communauté d'agglomération du Beauvaisis =

Federation of municipalities in France

Coordinates: 49.4327°N 2.0814°E

Beauvaisis
- Communauté d'agglomération
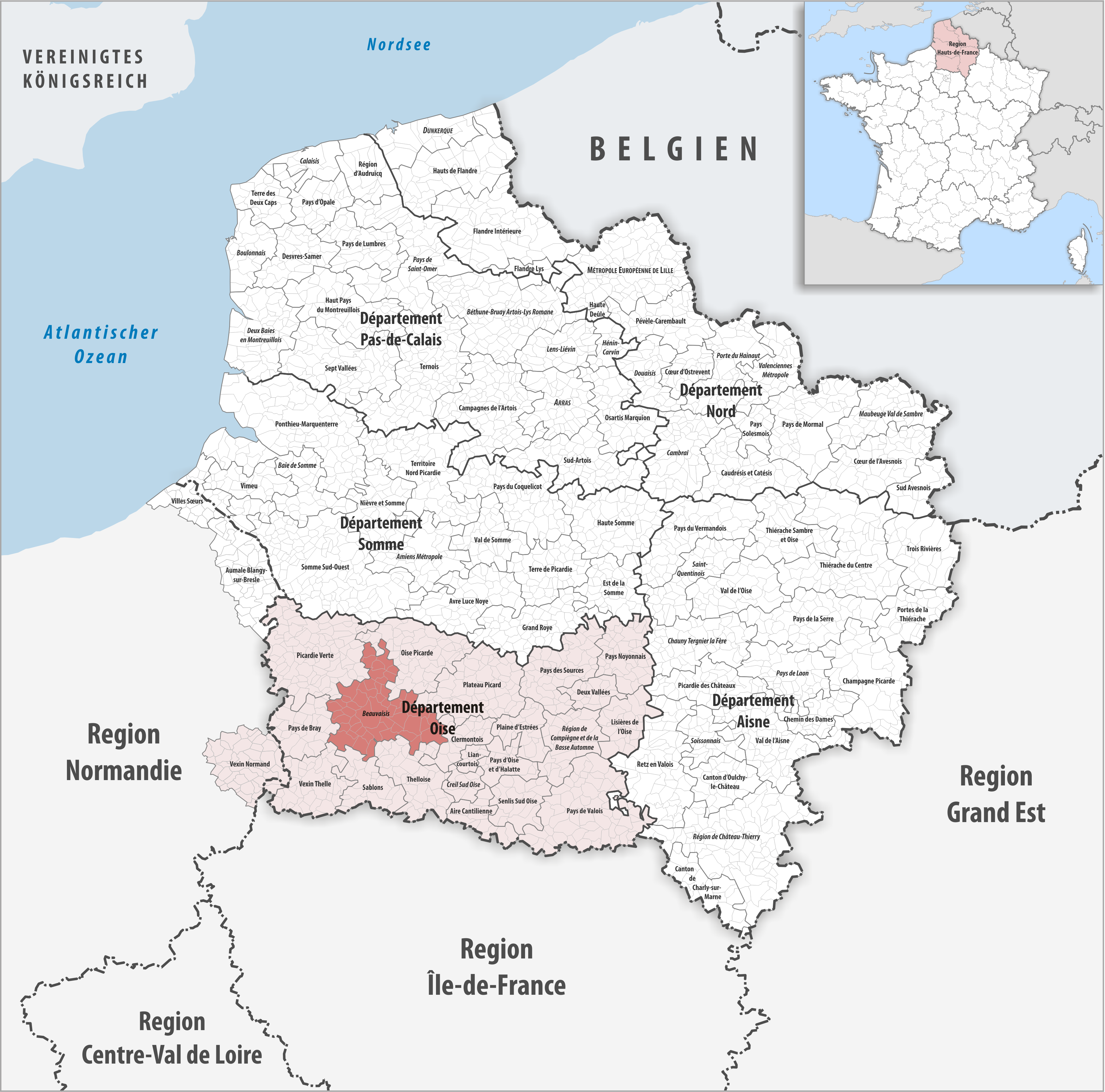
- Country: France
- Region: Hauts-de-France
- Department: Oise
- No. of communes: {{{nbcomm}}}
- Established: January 1, 2017

Government
  - President: Caroline Cayeux (LR)
- Area: 539.0 km^{2} (208.1 sq mi)
- Population (2023): 103,106
  - Density: 191.3/km^{2} (495.4/sq mi)
- Website: beauvaisis.fr

The Communauté d'agglomération du Beauvaisis is a communauté d'agglomération located in the Oise department and in the Hauts-de-France region of France. Its seat is in the town Beauvais. It was created on 1 January 2017 by merger of the former Communauté d'agglomération du Beauvaisis with the Communauté de communes rurales du Beauvaisis, and was expanded with 9 communes from the Communauté de communes de l'Oise Picarde in January 2018. Its area is 539.0 km^{2}. Its population was 103,934 in 2020, of which 56,889 in Beauvais proper.

== Composition ==
The communauté d'agglomération consists of the following 53 communes:

1. Allonne
2. Auchy-la-Montagne
3. Auneuil
4. Auteuil
5. Aux Marais
6. Bailleul-sur-Thérain
7. Beauvais
8. Berneuil-en-Bray
9. Bonlier
10. Bresles
11. Crèvecœur-le-Grand
12. Le Fay-Saint-Quentin
13. Fontaine-Saint-Lucien
14. Fouquenies
15. Fouquerolles
16. Francastel
17. Frocourt
18. Goincourt
19. Guignecourt
20. Haudivillers
21. Herchies
22. Hermes
23. Juvignies
24. Lachaussée-du-Bois-d'Écu
25. Lafraye
26. Laversines
27. Litz
28. Luchy
29. Maisoncelle-Saint-Pierre
30. Maulers
31. Milly-sur-Thérain
32. Le Mont-Saint-Adrien
33. Muidorge
34. La Neuville-en-Hez
35. Nivillers
36. Pierrefitte-en-Beauvaisis
37. Rainvillers
38. Rémérangles
39. Rochy-Condé
40. Rotangy
41. La Rue-Saint-Pierre
42. Saint-Germain-la-Poterie
43. Saint-Léger-en-Bray
44. Saint-Martin-le-Nœud
45. Saint-Paul
46. Le Saulchoy
47. Savignies
48. Therdonne
49. Tillé
50. Troissereux
51. Velennes
52. Verderel-lès-Sauqueuse
53. Warluis

== Demography ==
Demographic evolution of the territory
| Year | Pop. | ±% p.a. |
|---|---|---|
| 1968 | 74,417 | — |
| 1975 | 85,131 | +1.94% |
| 1982 | 87,417 | +0.38% |
| 1990 | 93,130 | +0.79% |
| 1999 | 96,899 | +0.44% |
| 2007 | 99,400 | +0.32% |
| 2012 | 99,575 | +0.04% |
| 2017 | 102,607 | +0.60% |
| 2023 | 103,106 | +0.08% |
In its geography at 1 January 2025. Source: INSEE

== Transport ==
The CAB is the organizing authority for mobility (AOTU). As such, it is the owner of the bus network known as Corolis since 2010, which serves Beauvais and the agglomeration. The agglomeration is a member of the Beauvais-Tillé Airport Mixed Union, founded on October 20, 2006, alongside the region and the department of Oise. This union owns Beauvais–Tillé Airport.

== See also ==
- Communes of the Oise department
