= Hondainville =

- Commune
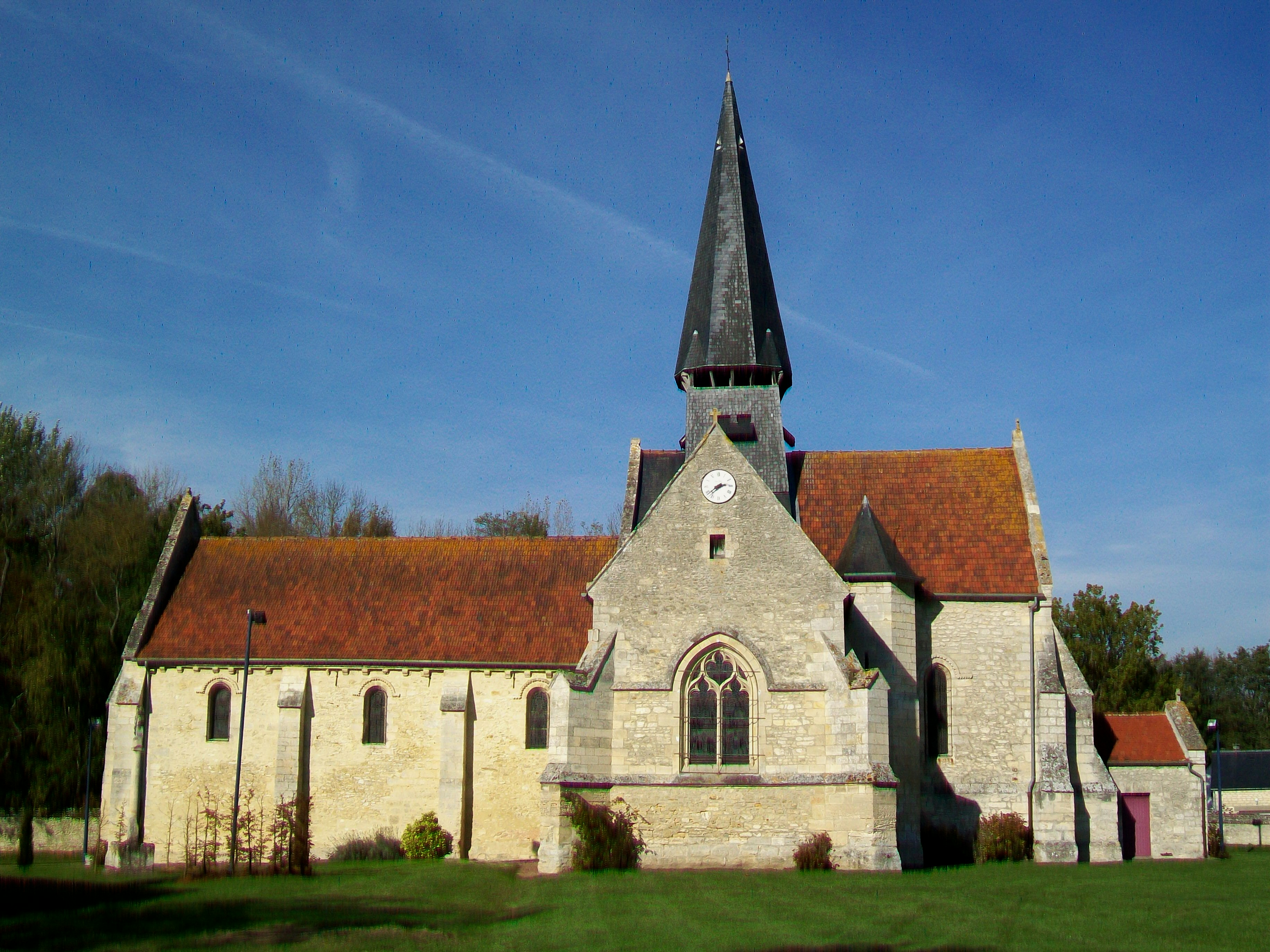
- The church in Hondainville
- Location of Hondainville
- Location within France Location within Hauts-de-France
- Coordinates: 49°20′27″N 2°18′05″E
- Country: France
- Region: Hauts-de-France
- Department: Oise
- Arrondissement: Clermont
- Canton: Mouy

Government
  - Mayor (2020–2026): Michèle Brichez
- Area^{1}: 6 km^{2} (2.3 sq mi)
- Elevation: 43 m (141 ft)
- Highest elevation: 131 m (430 ft)
- Lowest elevation: 38 m (125 ft)
- Population (2023): 704
  - Density: 120/km^{2} (300/sq mi)
- Time zone: UTC+01:00 (CET)
  - Summer (DST): UTC+02:00 (CEST)
- INSEE/Postal code: 60317 /60250
- ^{1} French Land Register data, which excludes lakes, ponds, glaciers > 1 km^{2} (0.386 sq mi or 247 acres) and river estuaries.

Hondainville (French pronunciation: [ɔ̃dɛ̃vil]) is a commune in the Oise department in northern France.

== See also ==
- Communes of the Oise department
