= Haudivillers =

- Commune
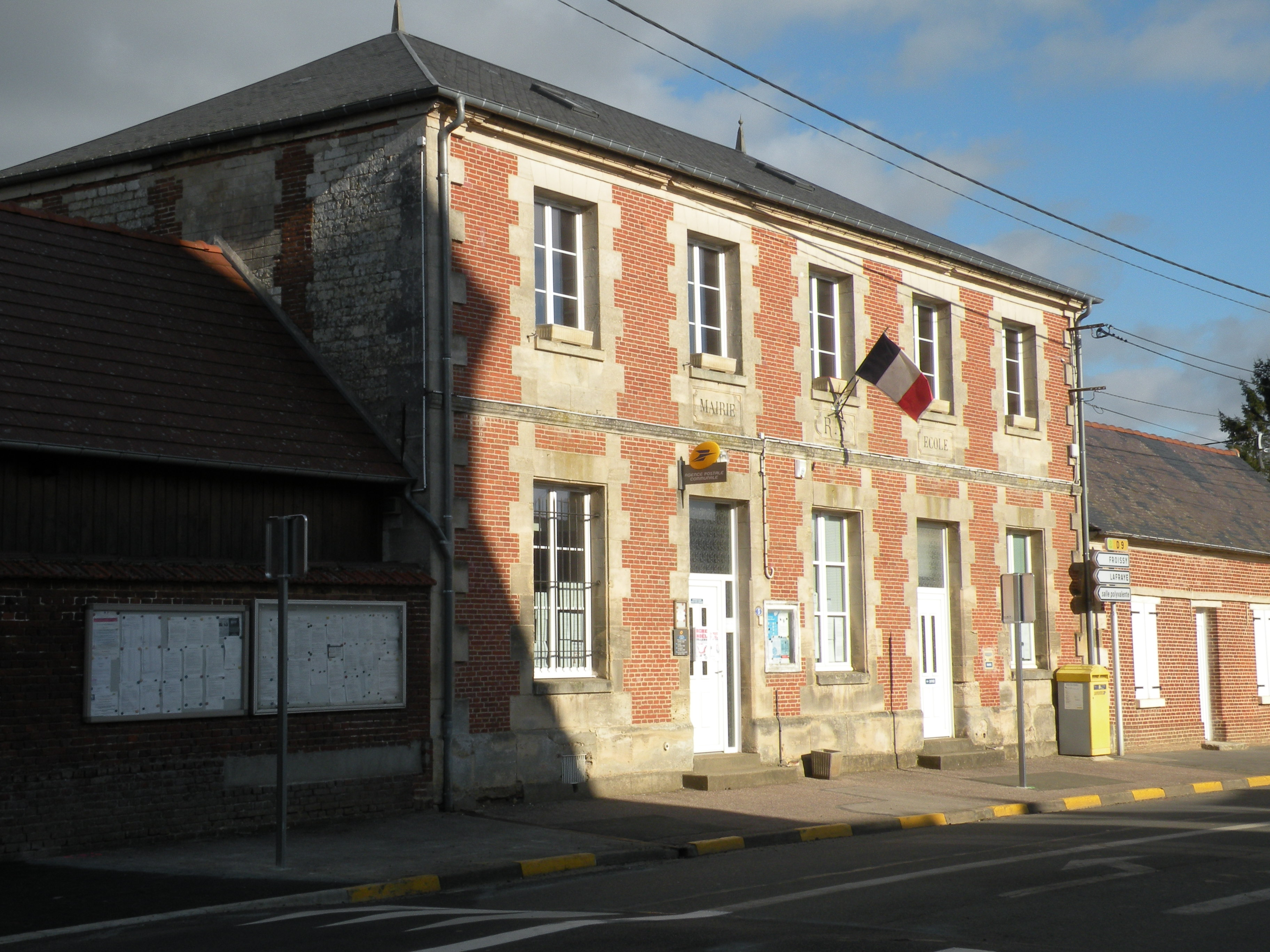
- The town hall in Haudivillers
- Location of Haudivillers
- Location within France Location within Hauts-de-France
- Coordinates: 49°29′14″N 2°14′39″E
- Country: France
- Region: Hauts-de-France
- Department: Oise
- Arrondissement: Beauvais
- Canton: Mouy
- Intercommunality: CA Beauvaisis

Government
  - Mayor (2020–2026): Sylvain Frenoy
- Area^{1}: 9.79 km^{2} (3.78 sq mi)
- Elevation: 135 m (443 ft)
- Highest elevation: 149 m (489 ft)
- Lowest elevation: 113 m (371 ft)
- Population (2023): 773
  - Density: 79.0/km^{2} (205/sq mi)
- Time zone: UTC+01:00 (CET)
  - Summer (DST): UTC+02:00 (CEST)
- INSEE/Postal code: 60302 /60510
- ^{1} French Land Register data, which excludes lakes, ponds, glaciers > 1 km^{2} (0.386 sq mi or 247 acres) and river estuaries.

Haudivillers (French pronunciation: [odivile]) is a commune in the Oise department in northern France.

== Geography ==
The territory of Haudivillers covers 9.79 km² (3.78 square miles) at an average altitude of 131 meters above sea level. The town is located on a plateau delimited by the small valleys of three rivers : the southwestern Thérain, the northwestern Liovette and eastern Brescia. This flat area is part of the Pays de Chaussée plateau, central component of the vast Picard plateau. Its landscape is dominated by open fields dotted with woodlands.

The municipality is bordered by dry valleys, called "Fonds". These ancient tributaries of the Brèche form, in the north, le Fond de l'Argilière, in the south the Fond du Fay and the Fond Genetel and in the west the Fond de Lafraye.

The town is organized around two county roads: the D125 and D9, crossing it respectively from east to west and north to south. On these routes, taking the name of the villages main streets (rue de l'Eglise, rue de la Poste, rue de la Grande Valley), connect eight perpendicular streets joined by other streets and alleys. A power line (400 kV) crosses the western part of the territory following a north-south axis.

=== Geology ===
On the geological map Haudivillers is located on the northern extension of the Paris Basin. It basement is composed mainly of Cretaceous chalk. Two abandoned white chalk quarries : les Carrières and le Rindet form an underground cavity north of the town. This chalk is covered with a thick silt clay of about four meters. More precisely the village is built on a yellowish sand klippe.

One of the original names of the commune is Hildinivillare. It named the location of a Roman villa or a group of dwellings (vicus). This name evolved over the centuries, becoming Haudivillare, Houdiviller, Audiviller, Haudivillé, Haudiviller and finally Haudivillers.

== See also ==
- Communes of the Oise department
