= Canton of Mouy =

Canton of France

Coordinates: 49.32°N 2.32°E

- Canton
- Situation of the canton of Mouy in the department of Oise
- Country: France
- Region: Hauts-de-France
- Department: Oise
- No. of communes: {{{nbcomm}}}
- Population (2023): 37,231
- INSEE code: 6014

The canton of Mouy is an administrative division of the Oise department, northern France. Its borders were modified at the French canton reorganisation which came into effect in March 2015. Its seat is in Mouy.

It consists of the following communes:

1. Angy
2. Ansacq
3. Bailleul-sur-Thérain
4. Bonlier
5. Bresles
6. Bury
7. Cambronne-lès-Clermont
8. Le Fay-Saint-Quentin
9. Fontaine-Saint-Lucien
10. Fouquerolles
11. Guignecourt
12. Haudivillers
13. Heilles
14. Hermes
15. Hondainville
16. Juvignies
17. Lafraye
18. Laversines
19. Litz
20. Maisoncelle-Saint-Pierre
21. Mouy
22. Neuilly-sous-Clermont
23. La Neuville-en-Hez
24. Nivillers
25. Oroër
26. Rémérangles
27. Rochy-Condé
28. La Rue-Saint-Pierre
29. Saint-Félix
30. Therdonne
31. Thury-sous-Clermont
32. Tillé
33. Troissereux
34. Velennes
35. Verderel-lès-Sauqueuse
