= Le Saulchoy =

- Commune
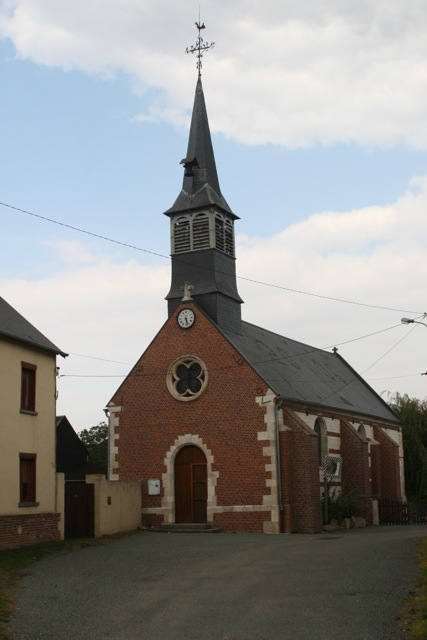
- The church in Le Saulchoy
- Location of Le Saulchoy
- Location within France Location within Hauts-de-France
- Coordinates: 49°38′04″N 2°08′28″E
- Country: France
- Region: Hauts-de-France
- Department: Oise
- Arrondissement: Beauvais
- Canton: Saint-Just-en-Chaussée
- Intercommunality: CA Beauvaisis

Government
  - Mayor (2020–2026): Éric Miclotte
- Area^{1}: 4.97 km^{2} (1.92 sq mi)
- Elevation: 174 m (571 ft)
- Highest elevation: 181 m (594 ft)
- Lowest elevation: 115 m (377 ft)
- Population (2023): 105
  - Density: 21.1/km^{2} (54.7/sq mi)
- Time zone: UTC+01:00 (CET)
  - Summer (DST): UTC+02:00 (CEST)
- INSEE/Postal code: 60608 /60360
- ^{1} French Land Register data, which excludes lakes, ponds, glaciers > 1 km^{2} (0.386 sq mi or 247 acres) and river estuaries.

Le Saulchoy (French pronunciation: [lə so(l)ʃwa]) is a commune in the Oise department in northern France.

== See also ==
- Communes of the Oise department
