= Rémérangles =

- Commune
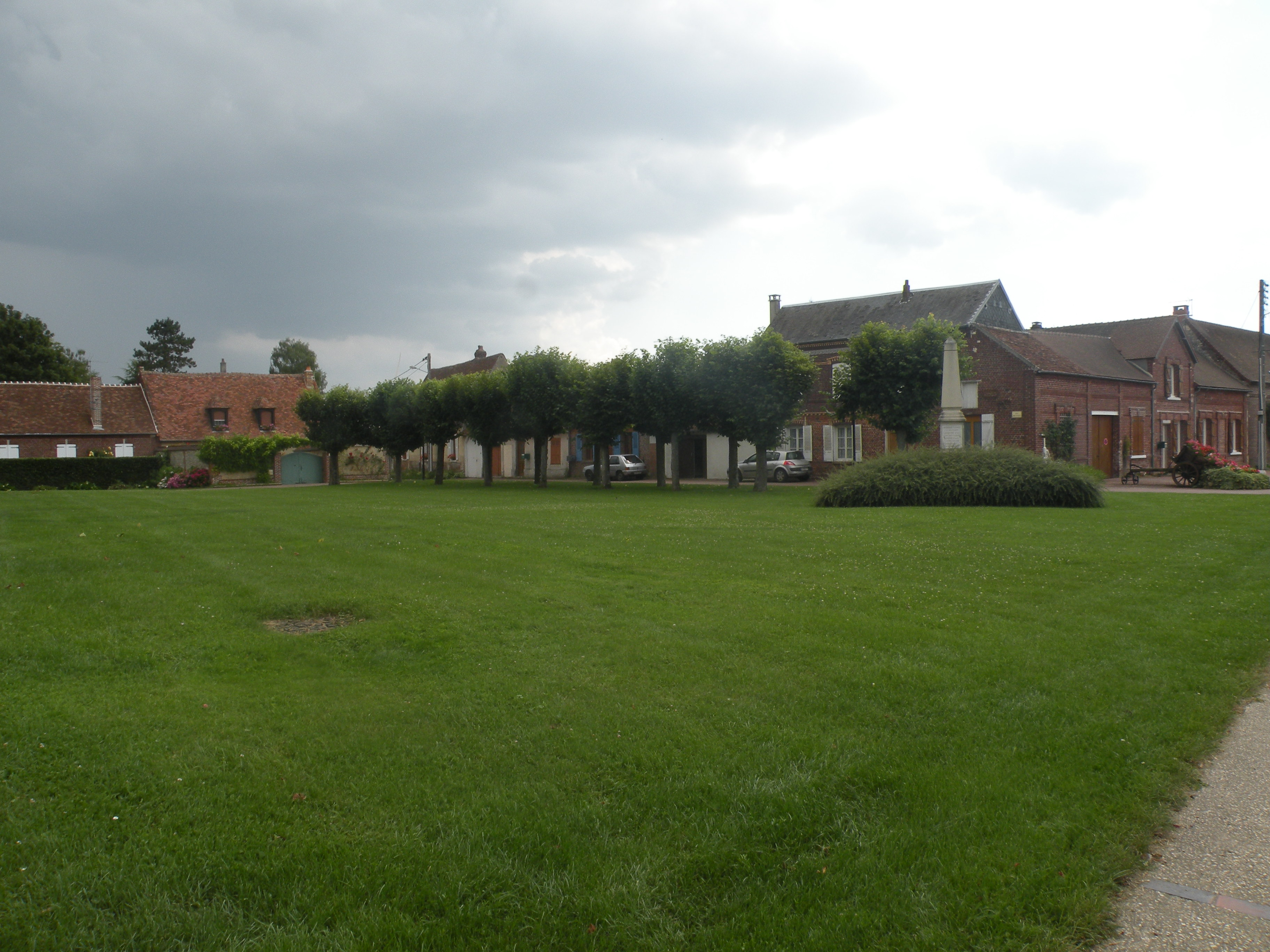
- The church square in Rémérangles
- Location of Rémérangles
- Location within France Location within Hauts-de-France
- Coordinates: 49°26′50″N 2°17′11″E
- Country: France
- Region: Hauts-de-France
- Department: Oise
- Arrondissement: Clermont
- Canton: Mouy
- Intercommunality: CA Beauvaisis

Government
  - Mayor (2020–2026): Hubert Proot
- Area^{1}: 8.2 km^{2} (3.2 sq mi)
- Elevation: 92 m (302 ft)
- Highest elevation: 121 m (397 ft)
- Lowest elevation: 77 m (253 ft)
- Population (2023): 210
  - Density: 26/km^{2} (66/sq mi)
- Time zone: UTC+01:00 (CET)
  - Summer (DST): UTC+02:00 (CEST)
- INSEE/Postal code: 60530 /60510
- ^{1} French Land Register data, which excludes lakes, ponds, glaciers > 1 km^{2} (0.386 sq mi or 247 acres) and river estuaries.

Rémérangles (French pronunciation: [ʁemeʁɑ̃ɡl]) is a commune in the Oise department in northern France.

== See also ==
- Communes of the Oise department
