= Muidorge =

- Commune
- Coat of arms
- Location of Muidorge
- Location within France Location within Hauts-de-France
- Coordinates: 49°31′53″N 2°08′28″E
- Country: France
- Region: Hauts-de-France
- Department: Oise
- Arrondissement: Beauvais
- Canton: Saint-Just-en-Chaussée
- Intercommunality: CA Beauvaisis

Government
  - Mayor (2022–2026): Dominique Kleber Dupille
- Area^{1}: 5.34 km^{2} (2.06 sq mi)
- Elevation: 130 m (430 ft)
- Highest elevation: 167 m (548 ft)
- Lowest elevation: 119 m (390 ft)
- Population (2023): 133
  - Density: 24.9/km^{2} (64.5/sq mi)
- Time zone: UTC+01:00 (CET)
  - Summer (DST): UTC+02:00 (CEST)
- INSEE/Postal code: 60442 /60480
- ^{1} French Land Register data, which excludes lakes, ponds, glaciers > 1 km^{2} (0.386 sq mi or 247 acres) and river estuaries.

Muidorge (French pronunciation: [mɥidɔʁʒ]) is a commune in the Oise department in northern France.

== See also ==
- Communes of the Oise department
