= Guignecourt =

- Commune
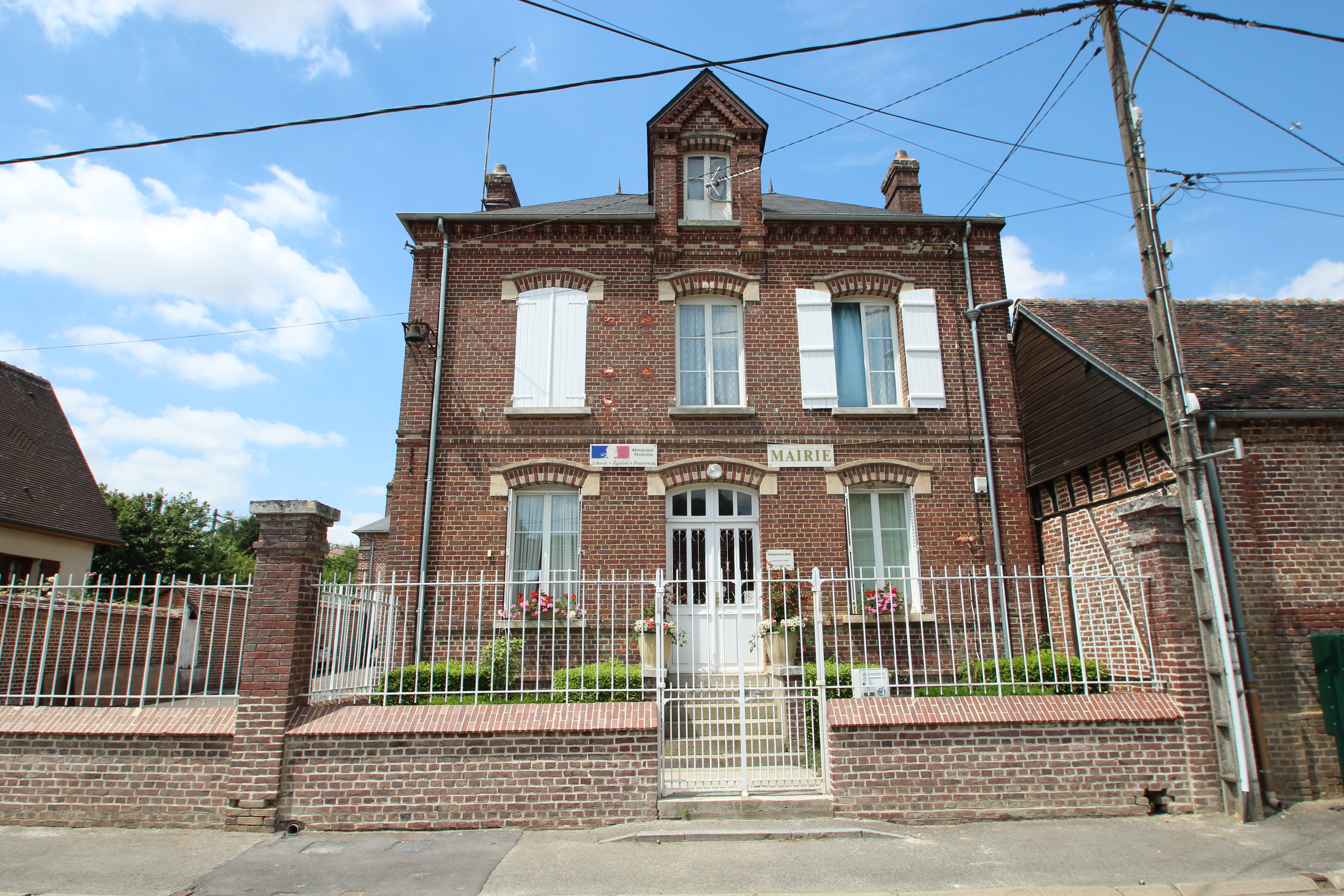
- The town hall in Guignecourt
- Location of Guignecourt
- Location within France Location within Hauts-de-France
- Coordinates: 49°29′00″N 2°07′49″E
- Country: France
- Region: Hauts-de-France
- Department: Oise
- Arrondissement: Beauvais
- Canton: Mouy
- Intercommunality: CA Beauvaisis

Government
  - Mayor (2020–2026): Philippe Desirest
- Area^{1}: 4.62 km^{2} (1.78 sq mi)
- Elevation: 100 m (330 ft)
- Highest elevation: 140 m (460 ft)
- Lowest elevation: 92 m (302 ft)
- Population (2023): 385
  - Density: 83.3/km^{2} (216/sq mi)
- Time zone: UTC+01:00 (CET)
  - Summer (DST): UTC+02:00 (CEST)
- INSEE/Postal code: 60290 /60480
- ^{1} French Land Register data, which excludes lakes, ponds, glaciers > 1 km^{2} (0.386 sq mi or 247 acres) and river estuaries.

Guignecourt (French pronunciation: [ɡiɲkuʁ]; Picard: Djincourt) is a commune in the Oise department in northern France.

== Population ==
Historical population
Year	Pop.	±% p.a.
1968	115	—
1975	187	+7.19%
1982	341	+8.96%
1990	367	+0.92%
1999	415	+1.38%
2007	401	−0.43%
2012	374	−1.38%
2017	381	+0.37%
2023	385	+0.17%
Source: INSEE

== See also ==
- Communes of the Oise department
