= Verderel-lès-Sauqueuse =

- Commune
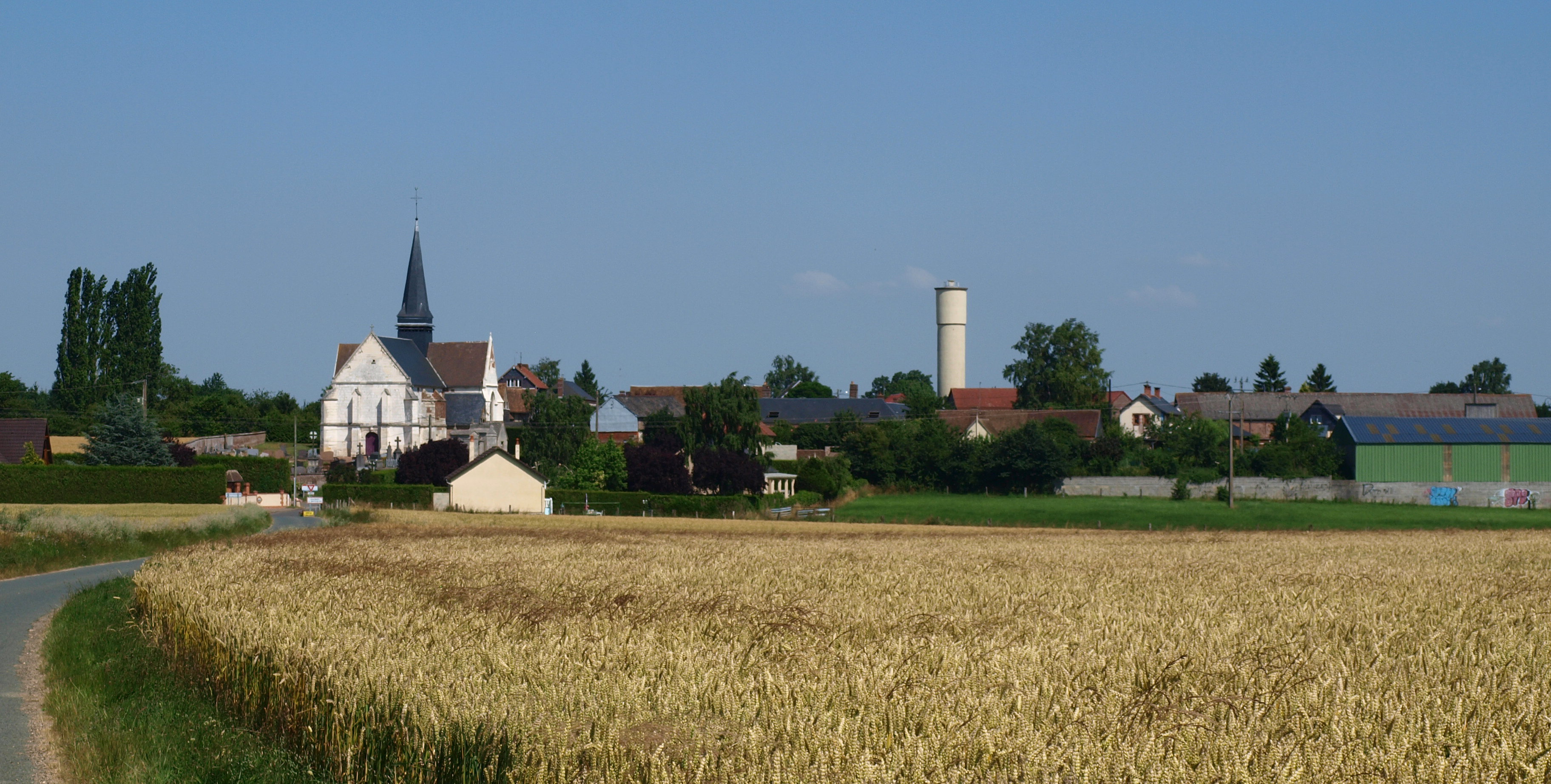
- A general view of Verderel-lès-Sauqueuse
- Location of Verderel-lès-Sauqueuse
- Location within France Location within Hauts-de-France
- Coordinates: 49°30′14″N 2°05′53″E
- Country: France
- Region: Hauts-de-France
- Department: Oise
- Arrondissement: Beauvais
- Canton: Mouy
- Intercommunality: CA Beauvaisis

Government
  - Mayor (2020–2026): Marcel Dufour
- Area^{1}: 12.46 km^{2} (4.81 sq mi)
- Elevation: 137 m (449 ft)
- Highest elevation: 165 m (541 ft)
- Lowest elevation: 93 m (305 ft)
- Population (2023): 721
  - Density: 57.9/km^{2} (150/sq mi)
- Time zone: UTC+01:00 (CET)
  - Summer (DST): UTC+02:00 (CEST)
- INSEE/Postal code: 60668 /60112
- ^{1} French Land Register data, which excludes lakes, ponds, glaciers > 1 km^{2} (0.386 sq mi or 247 acres) and river estuaries.

Verderel-lès-Sauqueuse (French pronunciation: [vɛʁdəʁɛl lɛ sokøz]) is a commune in the Oise department in northern France. It was created in 1973 by the merger of two former communes: Verderel and Sauqueuse-Saint-Lucien.

== See also ==
- Communes of the Oise department
