= Nivillers =

- Commune
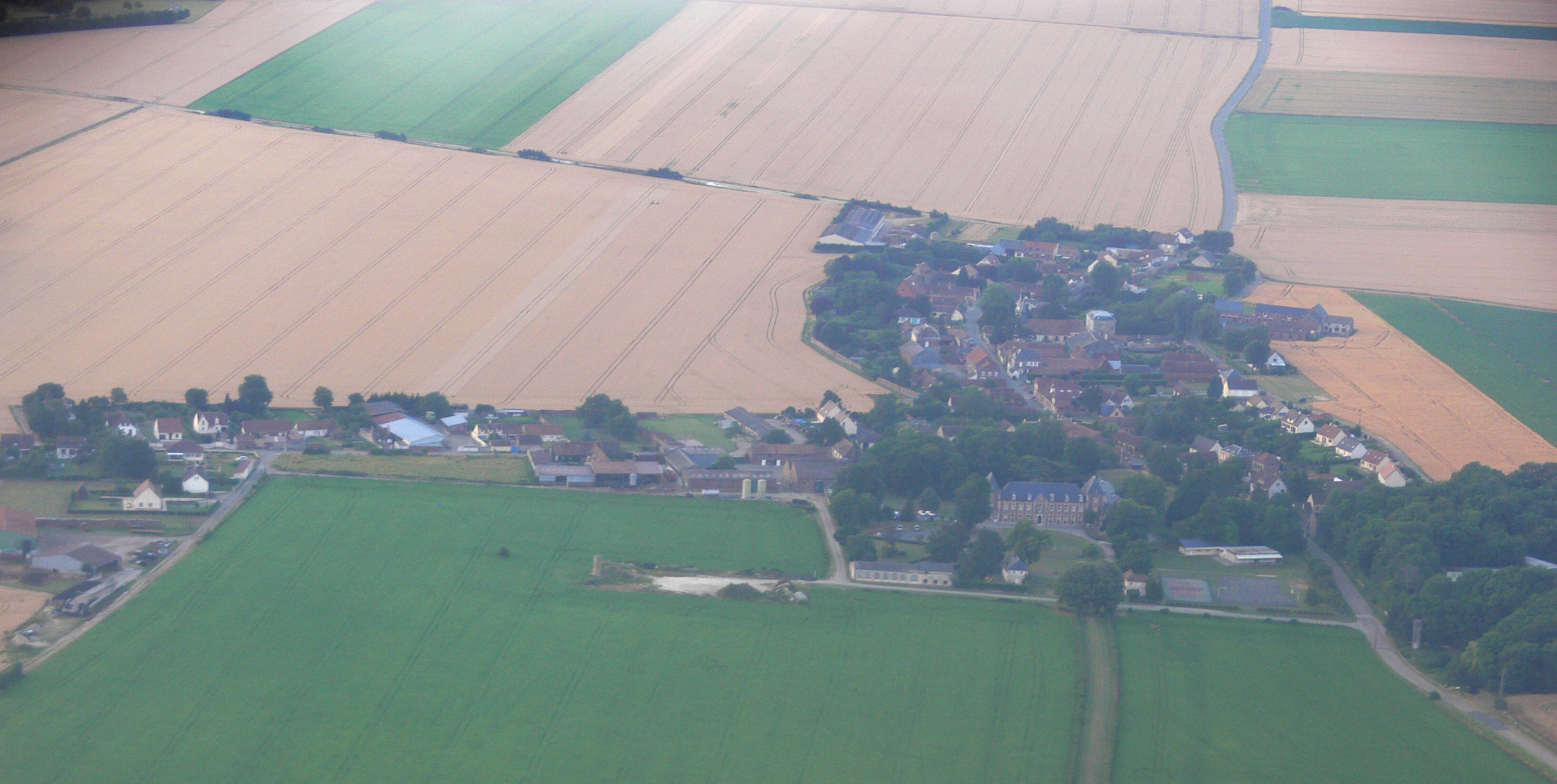
- An aerial view of Nivillers
- Location of Nivillers
- Location within France Location within Hauts-de-France
- Coordinates: 49°27′27″N 2°10′00″E
- Country: France
- Region: Hauts-de-France
- Department: Oise
- Arrondissement: Beauvais
- Canton: Mouy
- Intercommunality: CA Beauvaisis

Government
  - Mayor (2020–2026): Alexis Le Couteulx
- Area^{1}: 7.65 km^{2} (2.95 sq mi)
- Elevation: 100 m (330 ft)
- Highest elevation: 119 m (390 ft)
- Lowest elevation: 70 m (230 ft)
- Population (2023): 213
  - Density: 27.8/km^{2} (72.1/sq mi)
- Time zone: UTC+01:00 (CET)
  - Summer (DST): UTC+02:00 (CEST)
- INSEE/Postal code: 60461 /60510
- ^{1} French Land Register data, which excludes lakes, ponds, glaciers > 1 km^{2} (0.386 sq mi or 247 acres) and river estuaries.

Nivillers (French pronunciation: [nivilɛʁ]) is a commune in the Oise department in northern France.

== See also ==
- Communes of the Oise department
