= Fontaine-Saint-Lucien =

- Commune
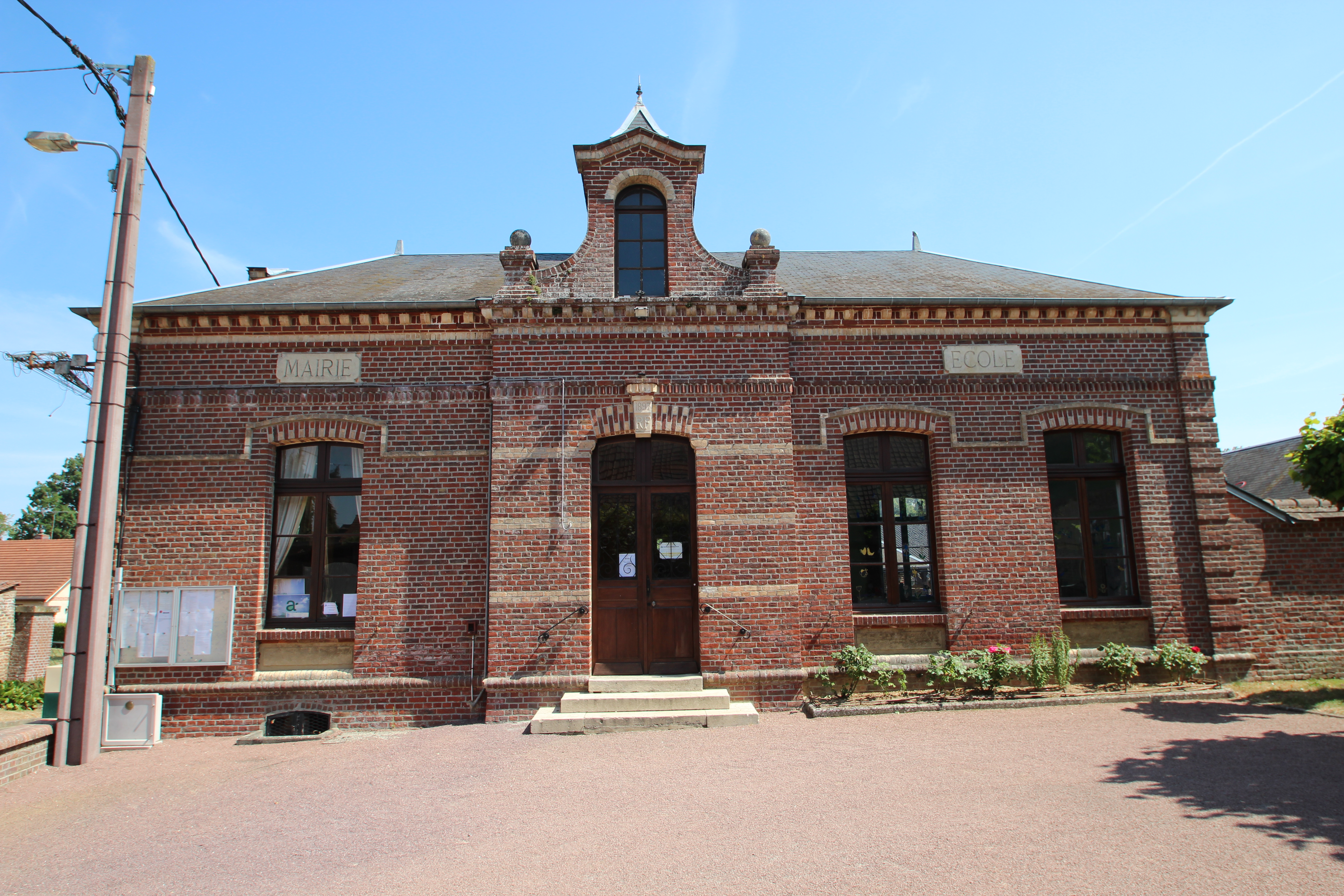
- The town hall in Fontaine-Saint-Lucien
- Location of Fontaine-Saint-Lucien
- Location within France Location within Hauts-de-France
- Coordinates: 49°29′59″N 2°08′51″E
- Country: France
- Region: Hauts-de-France
- Department: Oise
- Arrondissement: Beauvais
- Canton: Mouy
- Intercommunality: CA Beauvaisis

Government
  - Mayor (2020–2026): Laurent Delaere
- Area^{1}: 7.25 km^{2} (2.80 sq mi)
- Elevation: 135 m (443 ft)
- Highest elevation: 148 m (486 ft)
- Lowest elevation: 100 m (330 ft)
- Population (2023): 176
  - Density: 24.3/km^{2} (62.9/sq mi)
- Time zone: UTC+01:00 (CET)
  - Summer (DST): UTC+02:00 (CEST)
- INSEE/Postal code: 60243 /60480
- ^{1} French Land Register data, which excludes lakes, ponds, glaciers > 1 km^{2} (0.386 sq mi or 247 acres) and river estuaries.

Fontaine-Saint-Lucien (French pronunciation: [fɔ̃tɛn sɛ̃ lysjɛ̃]) is a commune in the Oise department in northern France.

== See also ==
- Communes of the Oise department
