= Therdonne =

- Commune
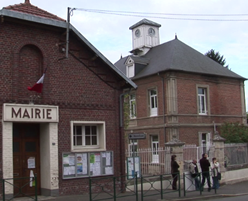
- Town hall and school
- Location of Therdonne
- Location within France Location within Hauts-de-France
- Coordinates: 49°25′12″N 2°09′20″E
- Country: France
- Region: Hauts-de-France
- Department: Oise
- Arrondissement: Beauvais
- Canton: Mouy
- Intercommunality: CA Beauvaisis

Government
  - Mayor (2023–2026): Martial Duflot
- Area^{1}: 8.98 km^{2} (3.47 sq mi)
- Elevation: 58 m (190 ft)
- Highest elevation: 113 m (371 ft)
- Lowest elevation: 54 m (177 ft)
- Population (2023): 1,225
  - Density: 136/km^{2} (353/sq mi)
- Time zone: UTC+01:00 (CET)
  - Summer (DST): UTC+02:00 (CEST)
- INSEE/Postal code: 60628 /60510
- ^{1} French Land Register data, which excludes lakes, ponds, glaciers > 1 km^{2} (0.386 sq mi or 247 acres) and river estuaries.

Therdonne (French pronunciation: [tɛʁdɔn]) is a commune in the Oise department in northern France.

== See also ==
- Communes of the Oise department
