= Bonlier =

- Commune
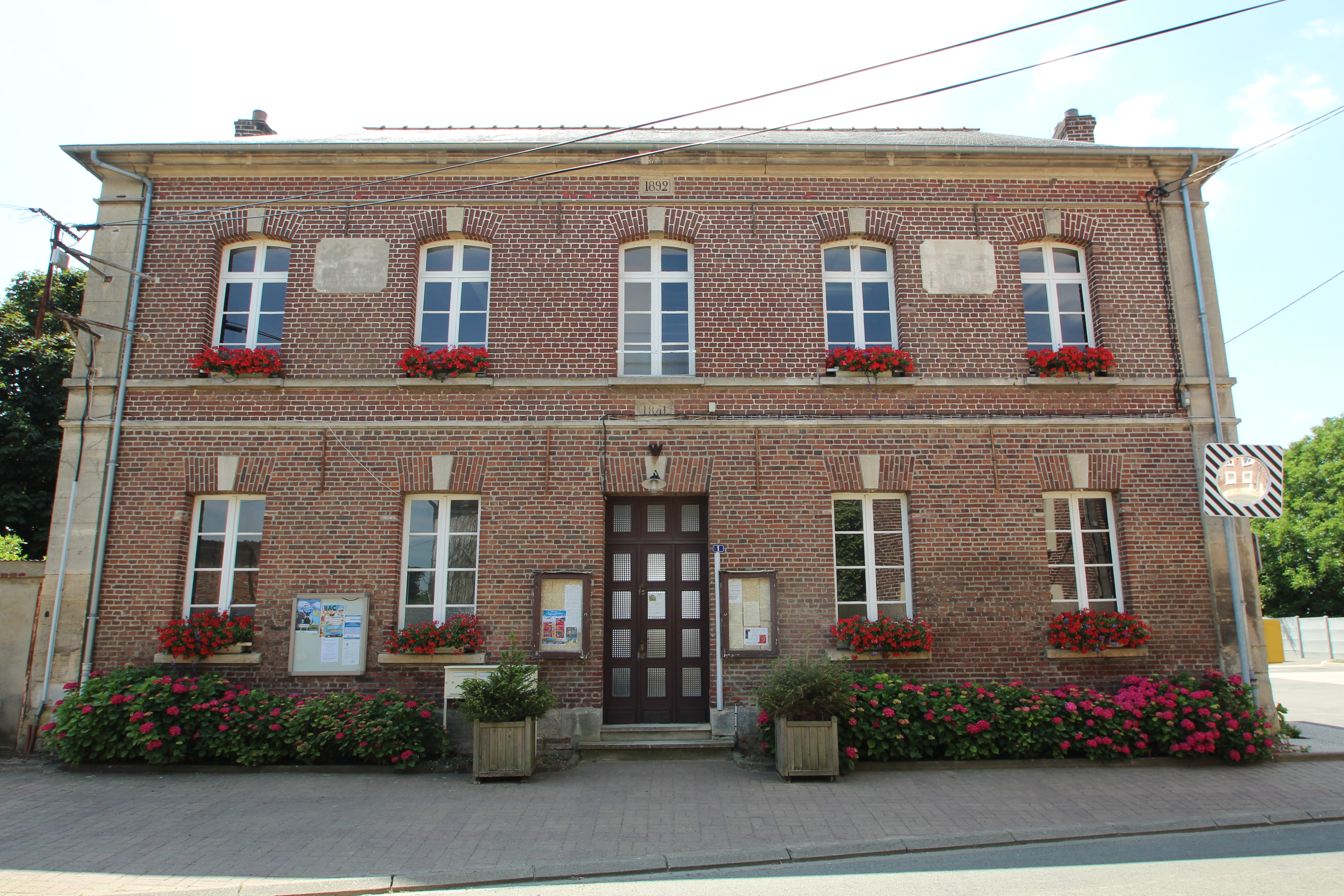
- The town hall in Bonlier
- Location of Bonlier
- Location within France Location within Hauts-de-France
- Coordinates: 49°28′16″N 2°09′02″E
- Country: France
- Region: Hauts-de-France
- Department: Oise
- Arrondissement: Beauvais
- Canton: Mouy
- Intercommunality: CA Beauvaisis

Government
  - Mayor (2020–2026): Martine Maillet
- Area^{1}: 4.47 km^{2} (1.73 sq mi)
- Elevation: 112 m (367 ft)
- Highest elevation: 133 m (436 ft)
- Lowest elevation: 99 m (325 ft)
- Population (2023): 467
  - Density: 104/km^{2} (271/sq mi)
- Time zone: UTC+01:00 (CET)
  - Summer (DST): UTC+02:00 (CEST)
- INSEE/Postal code: 60081 /60510
- ^{1} French Land Register data, which excludes lakes, ponds, glaciers > 1 km^{2} (0.386 sq mi or 247 acres) and river estuaries.

Bonlier (French pronunciation: [bɔ̃lje]) is a commune in the Oise department in northern France.

== Population ==
Historical population
Year	Pop.	±% p.a.
1968	154	—
1975	178	+2.09%
1982	222	+3.21%
1990	338	+5.40%
1999	385	+1.46%
2007	384	−0.03%
2012	397	+0.67%
2017	474	+3.61%
2023	467	−0.25%
Source: INSEE

== See also ==
- Communes of the Oise department
