= Maisoncelle-Saint-Pierre =

- Commune
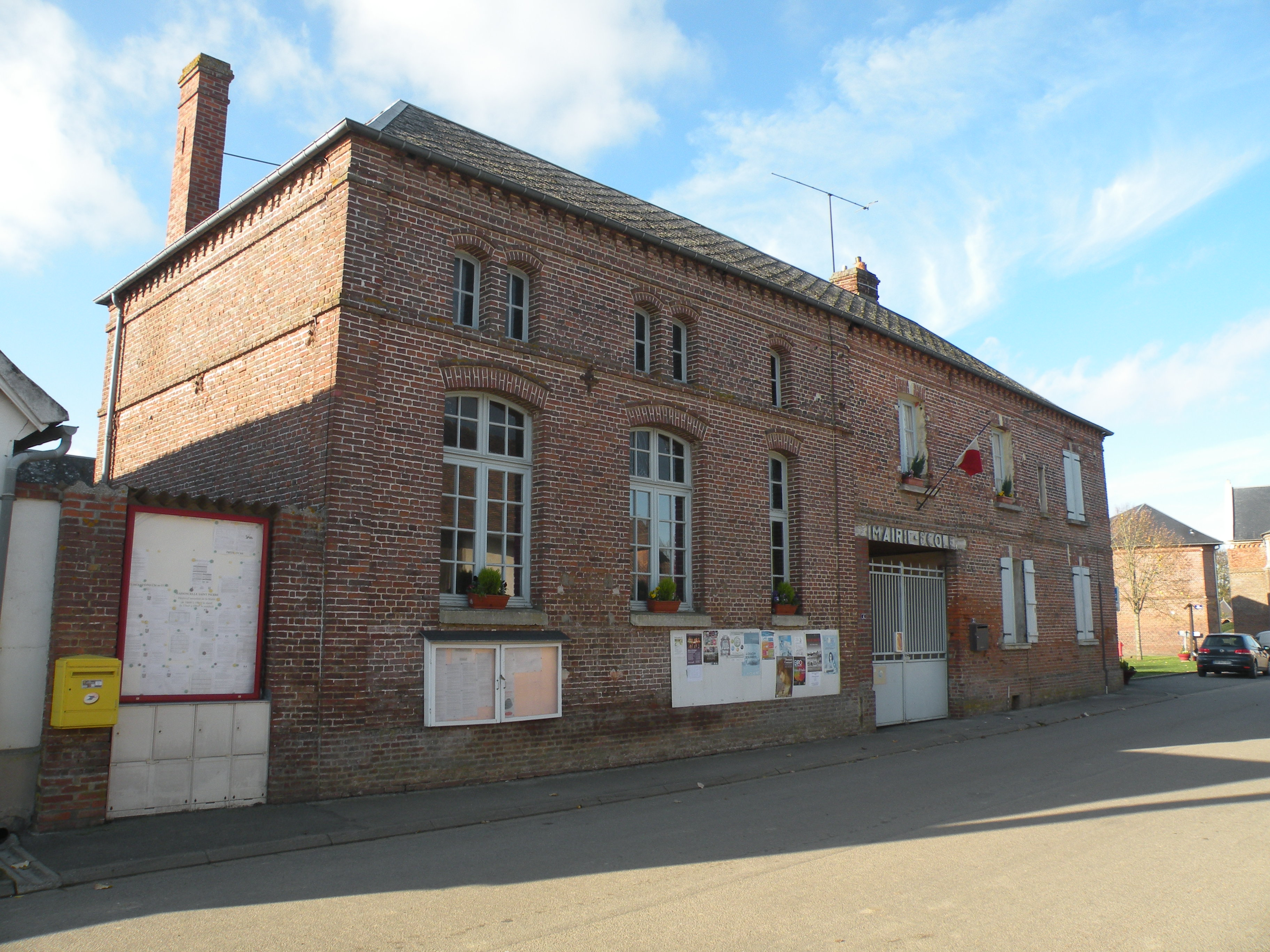
- The town hall in Maisoncelle-Saint-Pierre
- Location of Maisoncelle-Saint-Pierre
- Location within France Location within Hauts-de-France
- Coordinates: 49°30′43″N 2°07′41″E
- Country: France
- Region: Hauts-de-France
- Department: Oise
- Arrondissement: Beauvais
- Canton: Mouy
- Intercommunality: CA Beauvaisis

Government
  - Mayor (2020–2026): Noël Verschaeve
- Area^{1}: 4.16 km^{2} (1.61 sq mi)
- Highest elevation: 158 m (518 ft)
- Lowest elevation: 120 m (390 ft)
- Population (2023): 178
  - Density: 42.8/km^{2} (111/sq mi)
- Time zone: UTC+01:00 (CET)
  - Summer (DST): UTC+02:00 (CEST)
- INSEE/Postal code: 60376 /60112
- ^{1} French Land Register data, which excludes lakes, ponds, glaciers > 1 km^{2} (0.386 sq mi or 247 acres) and river estuaries.

Maisoncelle-Saint-Pierre (French pronunciation: [mɛzɔ̃sɛl sɛ̃ pjɛʁ]) is a commune in the Oise department in northern France.

== See also ==
- Communes of the Oise department
