= Troissereux =

- Commune
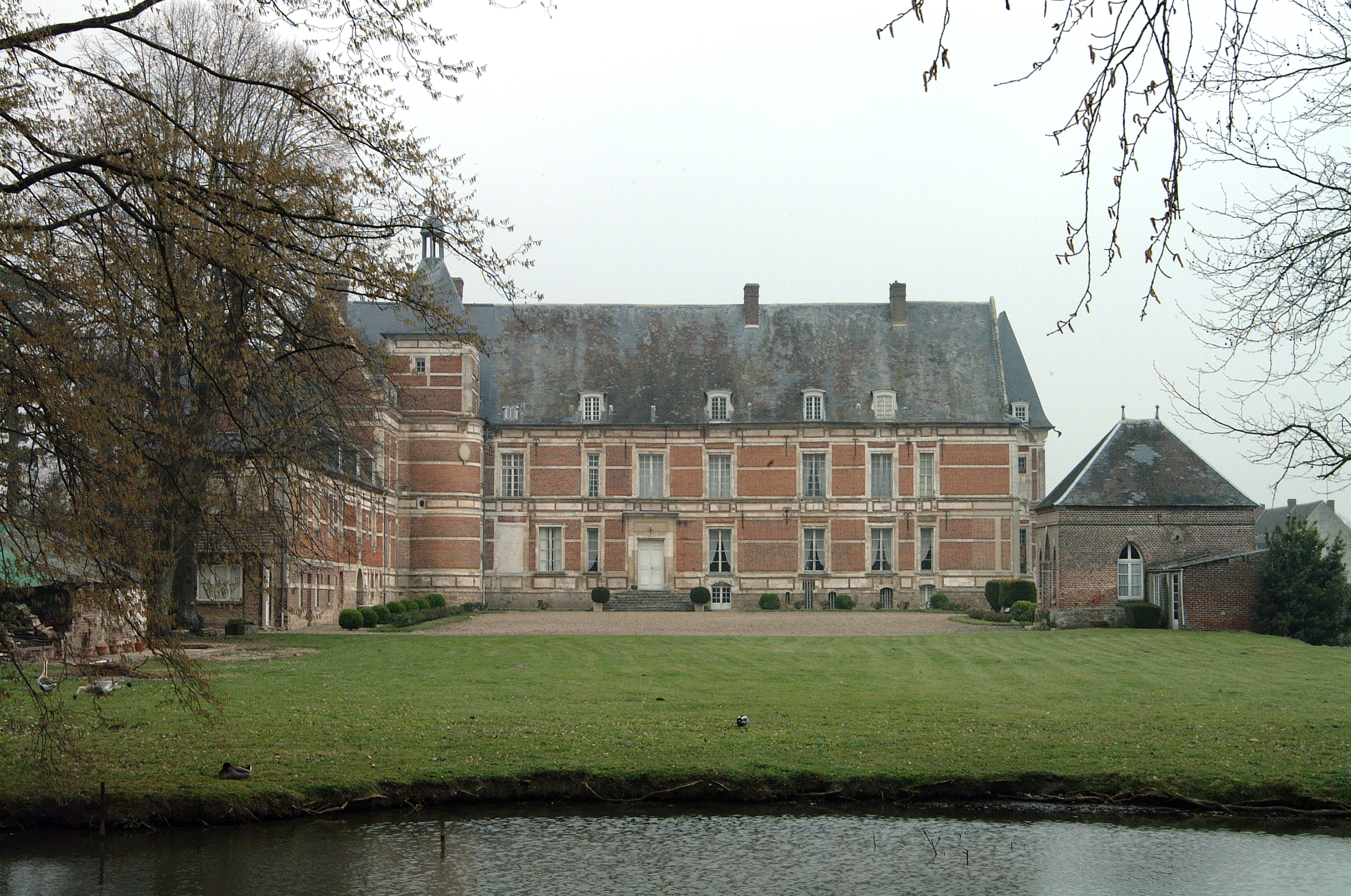
- Chateau de Troissereux

- Coat of arms
- Location of Troissereux
- Location within France Location within Hauts-de-France
- Coordinates: 49°28′49″N 2°02′37″E
- Country: France
- Region: Hauts-de-France
- Department: Oise
- Arrondissement: Beauvais
- Canton: Mouy
- Intercommunality: CA Beauvaisis

Government
  - Mayor (2020–2026): Christian Demay
- Area^{1}: 14.1 km^{2} (5.4 sq mi)
- Highest elevation: 145 m (476 ft)
- Lowest elevation: 68 m (223 ft)
- Population (2023): 1,374
  - Density: 97.4/km^{2} (252/sq mi)
- Time zone: UTC+01:00 (CET)
  - Summer (DST): UTC+02:00 (CEST)
- INSEE/Postal code: 60646 /60112
- ^{1} French Land Register data, which excludes lakes, ponds, glaciers > 1 km^{2} (0.386 sq mi or 247 acres) and river estuaries.

Troissereux (French pronunciation: [tʁwasʁø]) is a commune in the Oise department in northern France.

== See also ==
- Communes of the Oise department
