= Cambronne-lès-Clermont =

- Commune
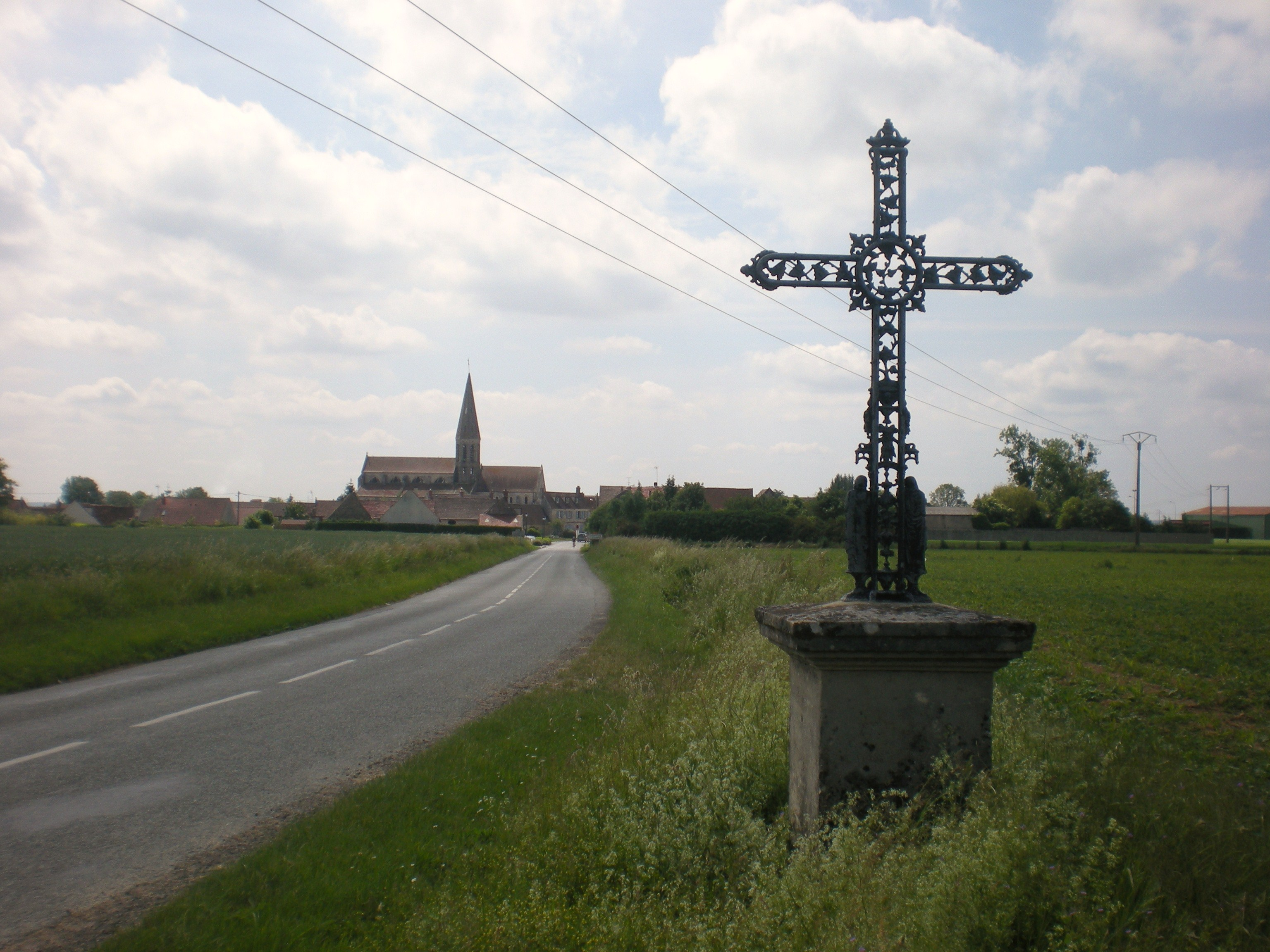
- The cross and village in Cambronne-lès-Clermont
- Location of Cambronne-lès-Clermont
- Location within France Location within Hauts-de-France
- Coordinates: 49°19′50″N 2°24′01″E
- Country: France
- Region: Hauts-de-France
- Department: Oise
- Arrondissement: Clermont
- Canton: Mouy
- Intercommunality: Clermontois

Government
  - Mayor (2020–2026): Christophe Gatté
- Area^{1}: 9.34 km^{2} (3.61 sq mi)
- Elevation: 120 m (390 ft)
- Highest elevation: 132 m (433 ft)
- Lowest elevation: 52 m (171 ft)
- Population (2023): 1,146
  - Density: 123/km^{2} (318/sq mi)
- Time zone: UTC+01:00 (CET)
  - Summer (DST): UTC+02:00 (CEST)
- INSEE/Postal code: 60120 /60290
- ^{1} French Land Register data, which excludes lakes, ponds, glaciers > 1 km^{2} (0.386 sq mi or 247 acres) and river estuaries.

Cambronne-lès-Clermont (French pronunciation: [kɑ̃bʁɔn lɛ klɛʁmɔ̃], literally Cambronne near Clermont) is a commune in the Oise department in northern France.

The town lies between the valleys of the rivers Brêche and Thérain. Like most towns in the Brêche Valley, Cambronne has stone quarries. The first were used there very long ago. In particular, they have provided the church and houses. Cambronne is known to have existed from the 9th century; and its name is of ancient origin. Its name comes from the words Camp (field) and Onna (source).

== History ==
Cambronne took advantage of much of its unused land after the French revolution at the end of the 18th century, producing cereals, potatoes, beets, and corn. Cambronne had two windmills. One, that of Ars, produced oil at the beginning of 19th century. The other was near the path of Marteau and Carrières, where the water reservoir is located.

== The Church of Cambonne ==
The church of Cambonne is one of its most important and famous monuments. In December 1239, Robert Cressonesart ( Cressonsacq ), bishop of Beauvais, dedicated the church of Cambronne in Saint Etienne. Mathilde of Burgundy, the widow of Philippe de France, a son of Philip Augustus, had completed it. It had been under construction from perhaps the 10th century. It has also been a historical monument since 1875. Rectangular in shape, it is 42 meters long and 14 meters wide. The tip of the cross is 32 meters above the ground. The octagonal stone tower is quite remarkable. The interior features paintings of the period, including a large mural from the thirteenth century (Christ presiding over the Last Judgment). The church is situated on the crest of a hill and the tower can be seen from as far away as the plateau Brêche. The front, north side, and bell tower are from the twelfth century. The nave is from around the time of transition. The heart is a Gothic style lancet arch, making the south side higher than the north. Its ribbed vaults are carried higher than the nave. Elegant support pillars, above the main arches, are decorated with three lobed berries topped with large glass clubs. A straight wall finishes the choir, which is square, and the floor is higher than the nave. There are five chapels divided by the aisles. Remnants of paint can be seen in various places of the walls and the vault of the choir, and the large mural from the thirteenth century still clearly visible on the wall that marks the end of the nave. The former part of the original mortar remains the location of the bells. The four bells are from the nineteenth century. The church contains the family tombs of the Hédouvilles, Villains, and others. Some gravestones are in the choir. Others are sealed in the south wall. The remains of a cross of the eleventh century, situated near the church in the old cemetery, were classified as a historic monument April 2, 1927. Unfortunately, a vandal damaged the upper part of this ordeal at the beginning of the 2000s.

== See also ==
- Communes of the Oise department
