= Canton of Beauvais-2 =

Canton of France

Coordinates: 49.43°N 2.08°E

- Canton
- Situation of the canton of Beauvais-2 in the department of Oise
- Country: France
- Region: Hauts-de-France
- Department: Oise
- No. of communes: {{{nbcomm}}}
- Population (2023): 47,259
- INSEE code: 6002

The canton of Beauvais-2 is an administrative division of the Oise department, northern France. It was created at the French canton reorganisation which came into effect in March 2015. Its seat is in Beauvais.

It consists of the following communes:

1. Allonne
2. Auneuil
3. Auteuil
4. Beauvais (partly)
5. Berneuil-en-Bray
6. Flavacourt
7. Frocourt
8. Goincourt
9. La Houssoye
10. Labosse
11. Lachapelle-aux-Pots
12. Lalande-en-Son
13. Lalandelle
14. Aux Marais
15. Ons-en-Bray
16. Porcheux
17. Rainvillers
18. Saint-Aubin-en-Bray
19. Saint-Léger-en-Bray
20. Saint-Martin-le-Nœud
21. Saint-Paul
22. Sérifontaine
23. Le Vaumain
24. Le Vauroux
25. Villers-Saint-Barthélemy
26. Warluis
