= Le Vaumain =

- Commune
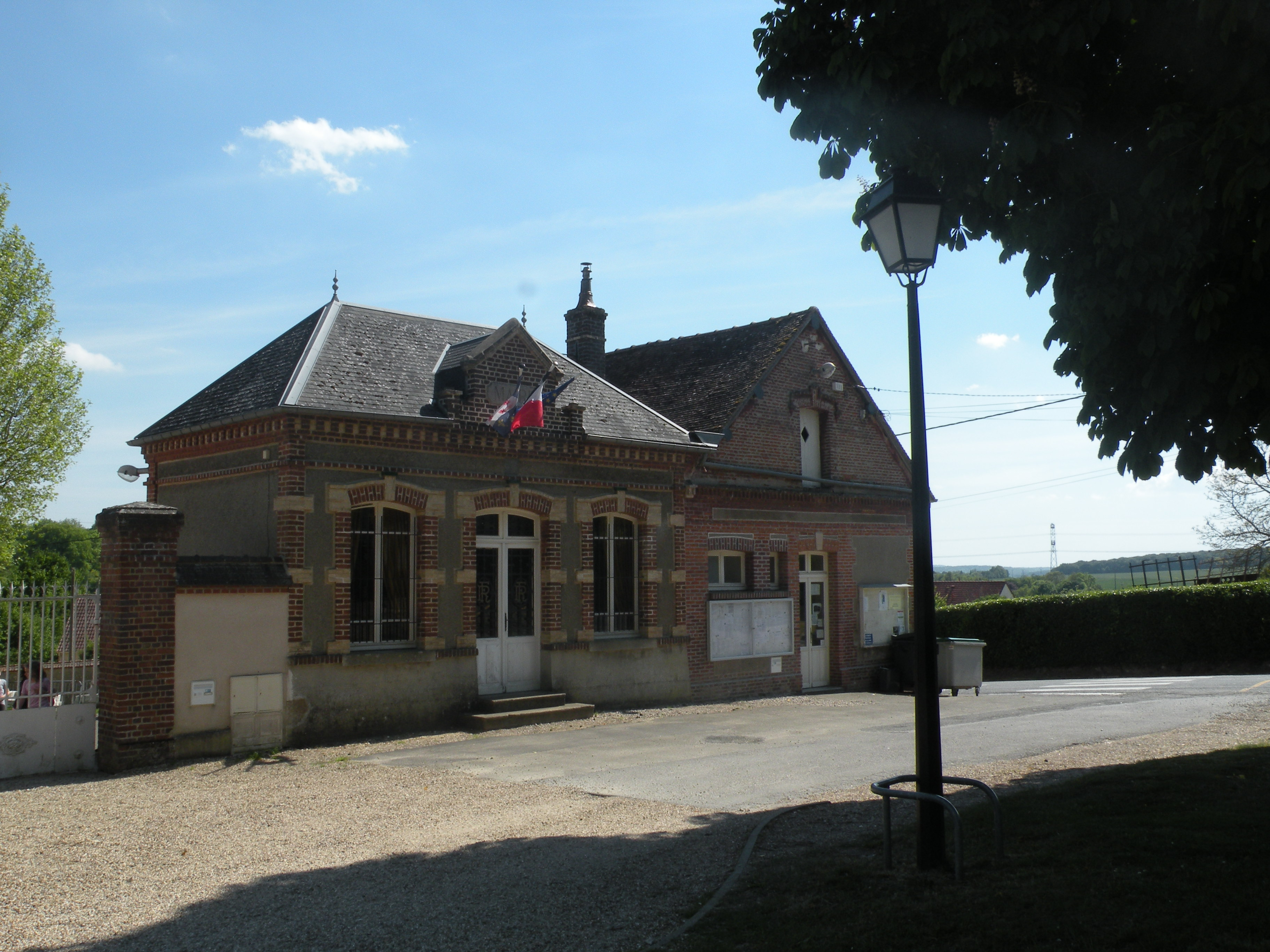
- The town hall in Le Vaumain

- Coat of arms
- Location of Le Vaumain
- Location within France Location within Hauts-de-France
- Coordinates: 49°20′13″N 1°52′07″E
- Country: France
- Region: Hauts-de-France
- Department: Oise
- Arrondissement: Beauvais
- Canton: Beauvais-2
- Intercommunality: Pays de Bray

Government
  - Mayor (2020–2026): Jean-Michel Duda
- Area^{1}: 8.1 km^{2} (3.1 sq mi)
- Elevation: 140 m (460 ft)
- Highest elevation: 185 m (607 ft)
- Lowest elevation: 87 m (285 ft)
- Population (2023): 401
  - Density: 50/km^{2} (130/sq mi)
- Time zone: UTC+01:00 (CET)
  - Summer (DST): UTC+02:00 (CEST)
- INSEE/Postal code: 60660 /60590
- ^{1} French Land Register data, which excludes lakes, ponds, glaciers > 1 km^{2} (0.386 sq mi or 247 acres) and river estuaries.

Le Vaumain (French pronunciation: [lə vomɛ̃]) is a commune in the Oise department in northern France.

== See also ==
- Communes of the Oise department
