= Warluis =

- Commune
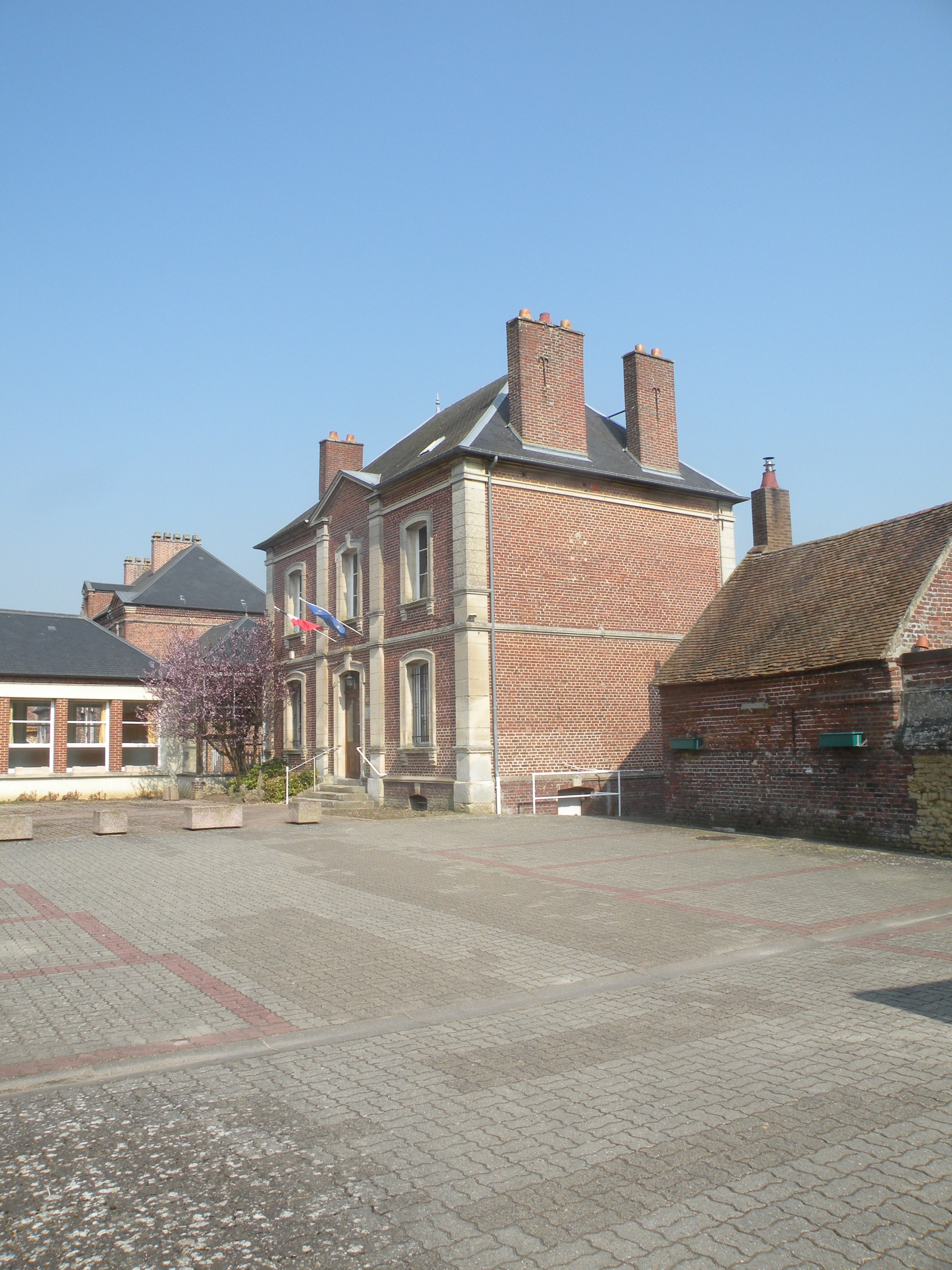
- The town hall in Warluis

- Coat of arms
- Location of Warluis
- Location within France Location within Hauts-de-France
- Coordinates: 49°23′17″N 2°08′28″E
- Country: France
- Region: Hauts-de-France
- Department: Oise
- Arrondissement: Beauvais
- Canton: Beauvais-2
- Intercommunality: Beauvaisis

Government
  - Mayor (2020–2026): Dominique Moret
- Area^{1}: 11.44 km^{2} (4.42 sq mi)
- Elevation: 75 m (246 ft)
- Highest elevation: 149 m (489 ft)
- Lowest elevation: 51 m (167 ft)
- Population (2023): 1,218
  - Density: 106.5/km^{2} (275.8/sq mi)
- Time zone: UTC+01:00 (CET)
  - Summer (DST): UTC+02:00 (CEST)
- INSEE/Postal code: 60700 /60430
- ^{1} French Land Register data, which excludes lakes, ponds, glaciers > 1 km^{2} (0.386 sq mi or 247 acres) and river estuaries.

Warluis (French pronunciation: [vaʁlɥi]) is a commune in the Oise department in northern France.

== Population ==
Historical population
Year	Pop.	±% p.a.
1968	654	—
1975	1,004	+6.31%
1982	1,156	+2.03%
1990	1,129	−0.29%
1999	1,166	+0.36%
2007	1,140	−0.28%
2012	1,141	+0.02%
2017	1,157	+0.28%
2023	1,218	+0.86%
Source: INSEE

== See also ==
- Communes of the Oise department
