= Mureaumont =

- Commune
- Location of Mureaumont
- Location within France Location within Hauts-de-France
- Coordinates: 49°37′48″N 1°46′41″E
- Country: France
- Region: Hauts-de-France
- Department: Oise
- Arrondissement: Beauvais
- Canton: Grandvilliers
- Intercommunality: Picardie Verte

Government
  - Mayor (2020–2026): Alain Degry
- Area^{1}: 4.74 km^{2} (1.83 sq mi)
- Elevation: 180 m (590 ft)
- Highest elevation: 216 m (709 ft)
- Lowest elevation: 170 m (560 ft)
- Population (2023): 141
  - Density: 29.7/km^{2} (77.0/sq mi)
- Time zone: UTC+01:00 (CET)
  - Summer (DST): UTC+02:00 (CEST)
- INSEE/Postal code: 60444 /60220
- ^{1} French Land Register data, which excludes lakes, ponds, glaciers > 1 km^{2} (0.386 sq mi or 247 acres) and river estuaries.

Mureaumont (French pronunciation: [myʁomɔ̃]) is a commune in the Oise department in northern France.

== Geography ==
The commune of Mureaumont is close to the border with the Seine-Maritime department. Mureaumont is located 4.2 km (2.6 mi) southeast from Formerie, 12.5 km (7.8 mi) west from Grandvilliers and 17 km (11 mi) north from Gournay-en-Bray.

== See also ==
- Communes of the Oise department
