= Frocourt =

- Commune
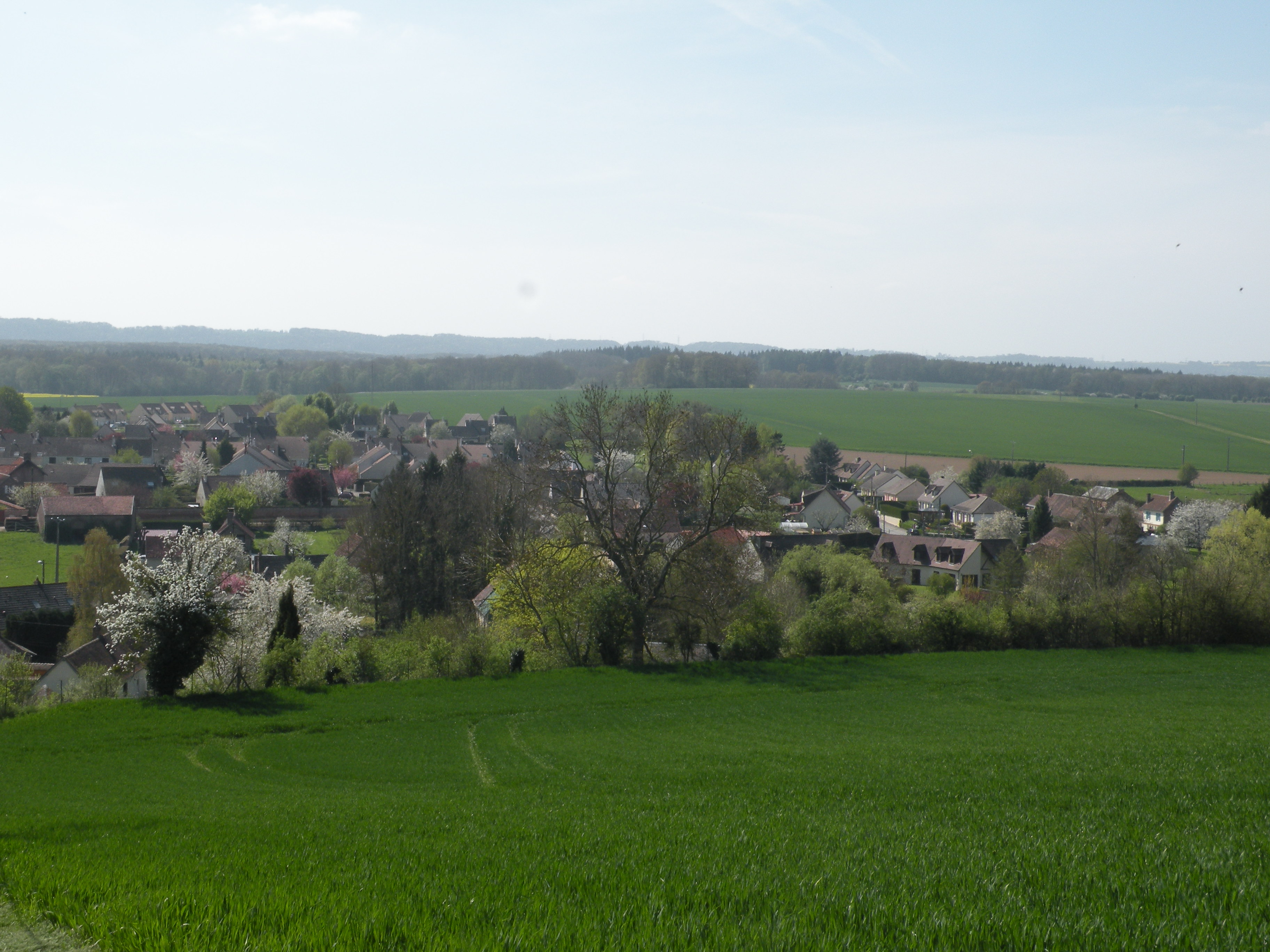
- A general view of Frocourt
- Location of Frocourt
- Location within France Location within Hauts-de-France
- Coordinates: 49°23′01″N 2°05′06″E
- Country: France
- Region: Hauts-de-France
- Department: Oise
- Arrondissement: Beauvais
- Canton: Beauvais-2
- Intercommunality: CA Beauvaisis

Government
  - Mayor (2020–2026): David Crevet
- Area^{1}: 6.44 km^{2} (2.49 sq mi)
- Elevation: 136 m (446 ft)
- Highest elevation: 152 m (499 ft)
- Lowest elevation: 77 m (253 ft)
- Population (2023): 528
  - Density: 82.0/km^{2} (212/sq mi)
- Time zone: UTC+01:00 (CET)
  - Summer (DST): UTC+02:00 (CEST)
- INSEE/Postal code: 60264 /60000
- ^{1} French Land Register data, which excludes lakes, ponds, glaciers > 1 km^{2} (0.386 sq mi or 247 acres) and river estuaries.

Frocourt (French pronunciation: [fʁɔkuʁ]) is a commune in the Oise department in northern France.

== See also ==
- Communes of the Oise department
