= Saint-Martin-le-Nœud =

- Commune
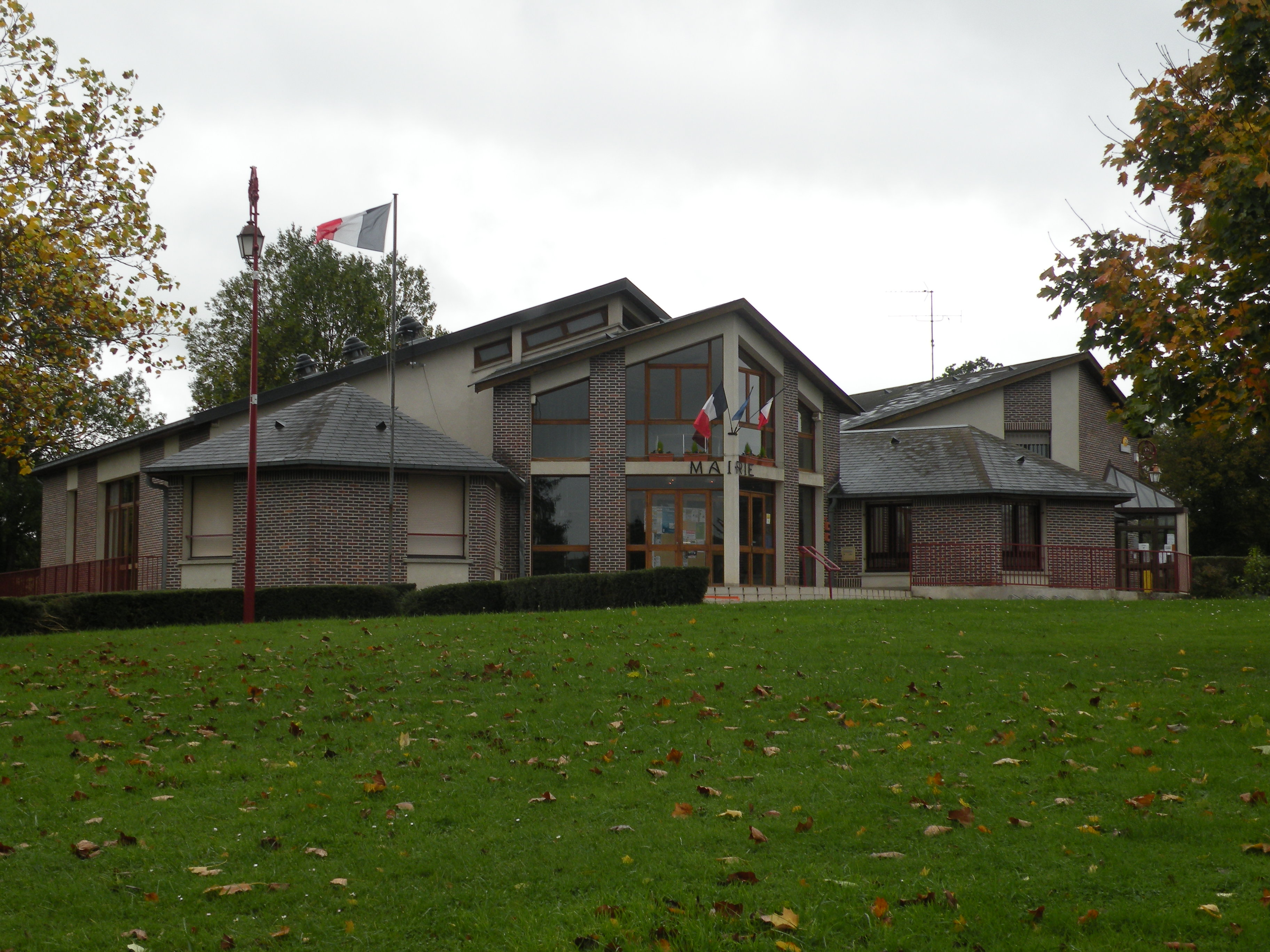
- The town hall in Saint-Martin-le-Nœud
- Location of Saint-Martin-le-Nœud
- Location within France Location within Hauts-de-France
- Coordinates: 49°23′48″N 2°03′41″E
- Country: France
- Region: Hauts-de-France
- Department: Oise
- Arrondissement: Beauvais
- Canton: Beauvais-2
- Intercommunality: CA Beauvaisis

Government
  - Mayor (2020–2026): Marius Benistant
- Area^{1}: 5.46 km^{2} (2.11 sq mi)
- Elevation: 100 m (330 ft)
- Highest elevation: 170 m (560 ft)
- Lowest elevation: 86 m (282 ft)
- Population (2023): 1,108
  - Density: 203/km^{2} (526/sq mi)
- Time zone: UTC+01:00 (CET)
  - Summer (DST): UTC+02:00 (CEST)
- INSEE/Postal code: 60586 /60000
- ^{1} French Land Register data, which excludes lakes, ponds, glaciers > 1 km^{2} (0.386 sq mi or 247 acres) and river estuaries.

Saint-Martin-le-Nœud (French pronunciation: [sɛ̃ maʁtɛ̃ lə nø]) is a commune in the Oise department in northern France.

== See also ==
- Communes of the Oise department
