= Ivry-le-Temple =

- Commune
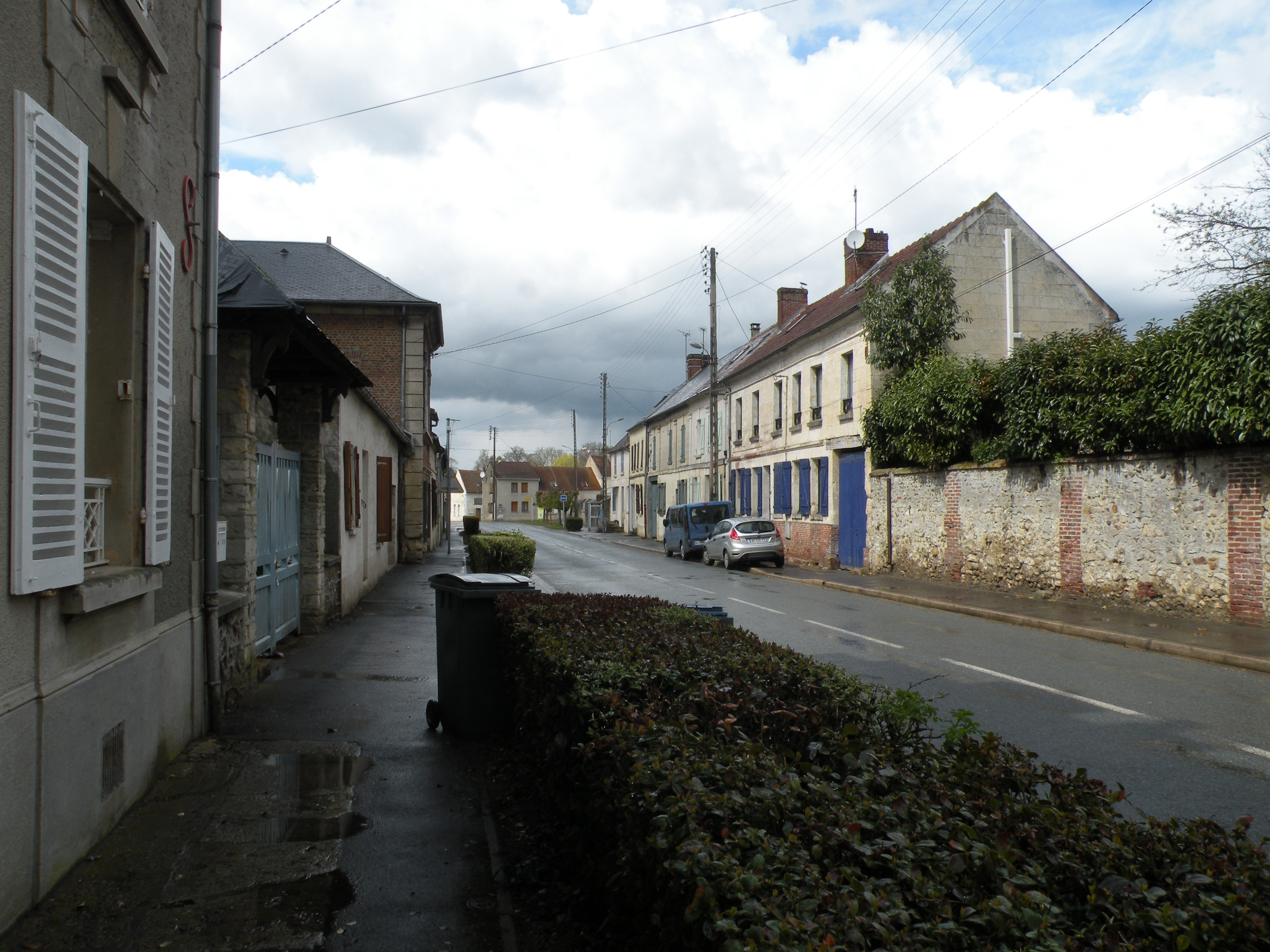
- The main road in Ivry-le-Temple
- Location of Ivry-le-Temple
- Location within France Location within Hauts-de-France
- Coordinates: 49°13′46″N 2°01′51″E
- Country: France
- Region: Hauts-de-France
- Department: Oise
- Arrondissement: Beauvais
- Canton: Chaumont-en-Vexin
- Intercommunality: Sablons

Government
  - Mayor (2020–2026): Catherine Herman
- Area^{1}: 12.47 km^{2} (4.81 sq mi)
- Elevation: 84 m (276 ft)
- Highest elevation: 126 m (413 ft)
- Lowest elevation: 72 m (236 ft)
- Population (2023): 878
  - Density: 70.4/km^{2} (182/sq mi)
- Time zone: UTC+01:00 (CET)
  - Summer (DST): UTC+02:00 (CEST)
- INSEE/Postal code: 60321 /60173
- ^{1} French Land Register data, which excludes lakes, ponds, glaciers > 1 km^{2} (0.386 sq mi or 247 acres) and river estuaries.

Ivry-le-Temple (French pronunciation: [ivʁi lə tɑ̃pl]) is a commune in the Oise department in northern France.

== See also ==
- Communes of the Oise department
