= Rainvillers =

- Commune
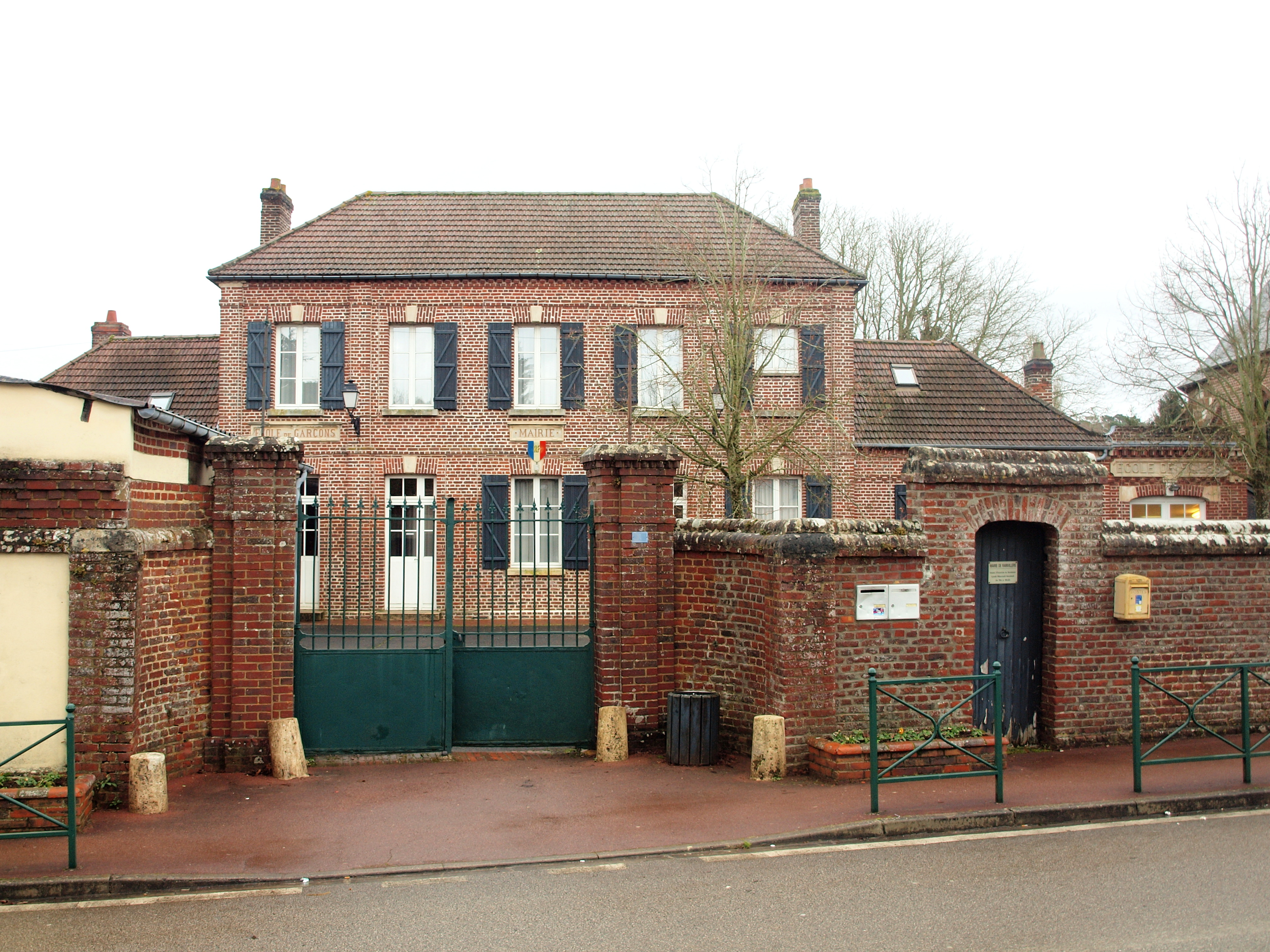
- The town hall in Rainvillers
- Location of Rainvillers
- Location within France Location within Hauts-de-France
- Coordinates: 49°24′24″N 2°00′31″E
- Country: France
- Region: Hauts-de-France
- Department: Oise
- Arrondissement: Beauvais
- Canton: Beauvais-2
- Intercommunality: CA Beauvaisis

Government
  - Mayor (2020–2026): Laurent Lefevre
- Area^{1}: 6.5 km^{2} (2.5 sq mi)
- Elevation: 82 m (269 ft)
- Highest elevation: 124 m (407 ft)
- Lowest elevation: 71 m (233 ft)
- Population (2023): 895
  - Density: 140/km^{2} (360/sq mi)
- Time zone: UTC+01:00 (CET)
  - Summer (DST): UTC+02:00 (CEST)
- INSEE/Postal code: 60523 /60155
- ^{1} French Land Register data, which excludes lakes, ponds, glaciers > 1 km^{2} (0.386 sq mi or 247 acres) and river estuaries.

Rainvillers is a commune in the Oise department in northern France.

== See also ==
- Communes of the Oise department
