= Villers-Saint-Barthélemy =

- Commune
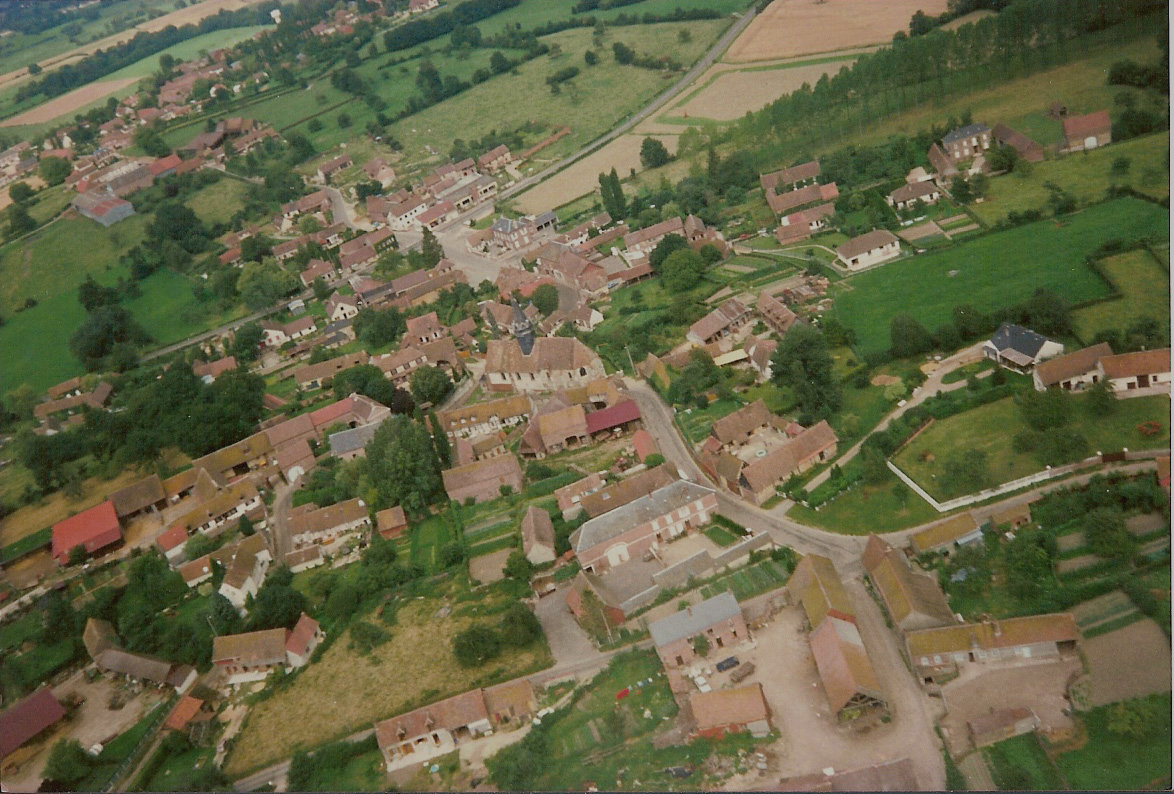
- An aerial view of Villers-Saint-Barthélemy
- Location of Villers-Saint-Barthélemy
- Location within France Location within Hauts-de-France
- Coordinates: 49°23′56″N 1°56′54″E
- Country: France
- Region: Hauts-de-France
- Department: Oise
- Arrondissement: Beauvais
- Canton: Beauvais-2

Government
  - Mayor (2020–2026): Philippe Vinchent
- Area^{1}: 9.9 km^{2} (3.8 sq mi)
- Elevation: 140 m (460 ft)
- Highest elevation: 185 m (607 ft)
- Lowest elevation: 79 m (259 ft)
- Population (2023): 474
  - Density: 48/km^{2} (120/sq mi)
- Time zone: UTC+01:00 (CET)
  - Summer (DST): UTC+02:00 (CEST)
- INSEE/Postal code: 60681 /60650
- ^{1} French Land Register data, which excludes lakes, ponds, glaciers > 1 km^{2} (0.386 sq mi or 247 acres) and river estuaries.

Villers-Saint-Barthélemy (French pronunciation: [vilɛʁ sɛ̃ baʁtelemi]) is a commune in the Oise department in northern France.

== See also ==
- Communes of the Oise department
