= Saint-Léger-en-Bray =

- Commune
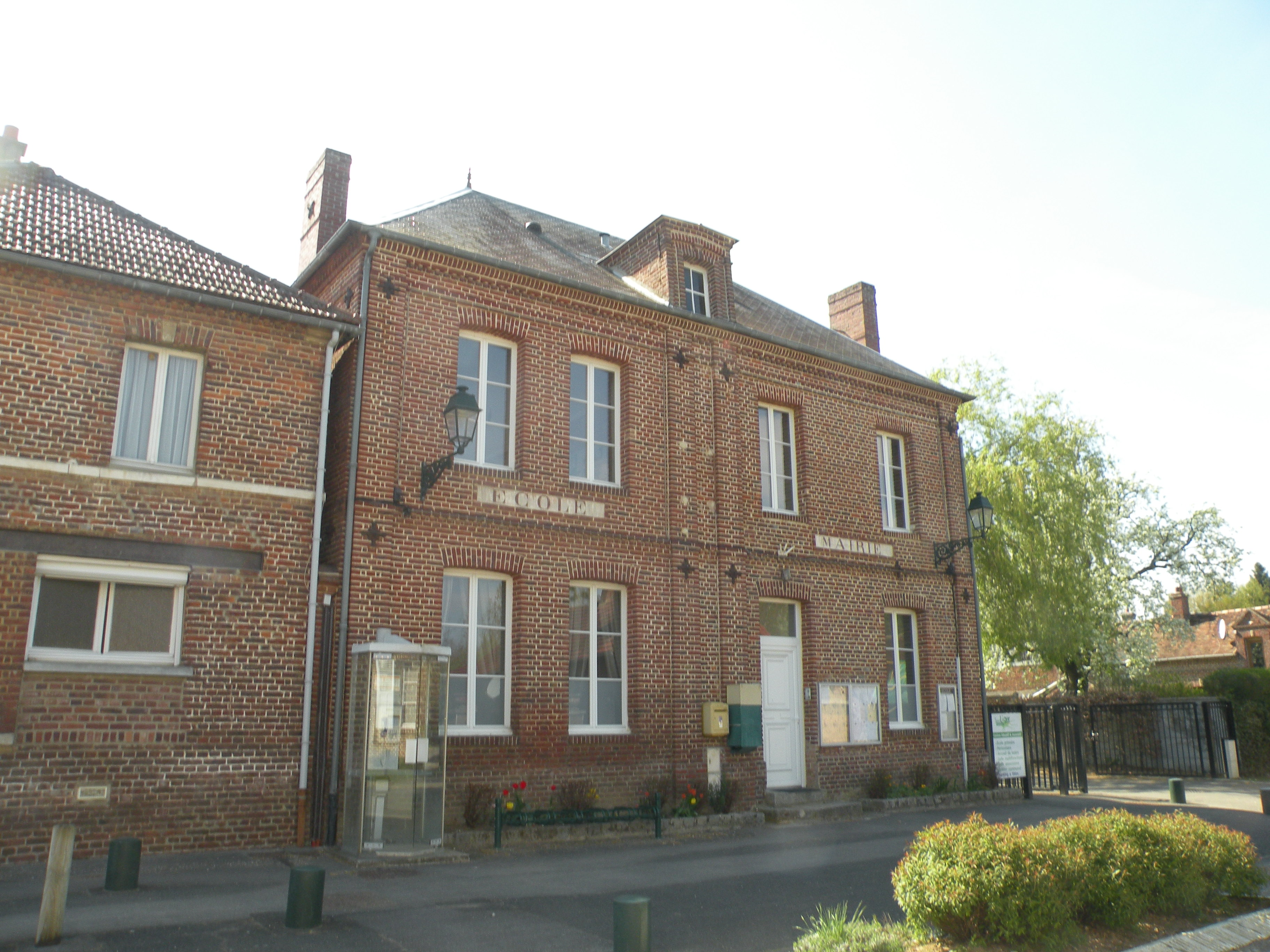
- The town hall in Saint-Léger-en-Bray
- Location of Saint-Léger-en-Bray
- Location within France Location within Hauts-de-France
- Coordinates: 49°23′29″N 2°01′39″E
- Country: France
- Region: Hauts-de-France
- Department: Oise
- Arrondissement: Beauvais
- Canton: Beauvais-2
- Intercommunality: CA Beauvaisis

Government
  - Mayor (2020–2026): Laurent Delmas
- Area^{1}: 4.43 km^{2} (1.71 sq mi)
- Elevation: 89 m (292 ft)
- Highest elevation: 113 m (371 ft)
- Lowest elevation: 77 m (253 ft)
- Population (2023): 378
  - Density: 85.3/km^{2} (221/sq mi)
- Time zone: UTC+01:00 (CET)
  - Summer (DST): UTC+02:00 (CEST)
- INSEE/Postal code: 60583 /60155
- ^{1} French Land Register data, which excludes lakes, ponds, glaciers > 1 km^{2} (0.386 sq mi or 247 acres) and river estuaries.

Saint-Léger-en-Bray (French pronunciation: [sɛ̃ leʒe ɑ̃ bʁɛ], literally Saint-Léger in Bray) is a commune in the Oise department in northern France.

== See also ==
- Communes of the Oise department
