= Goincourt =

- Commune
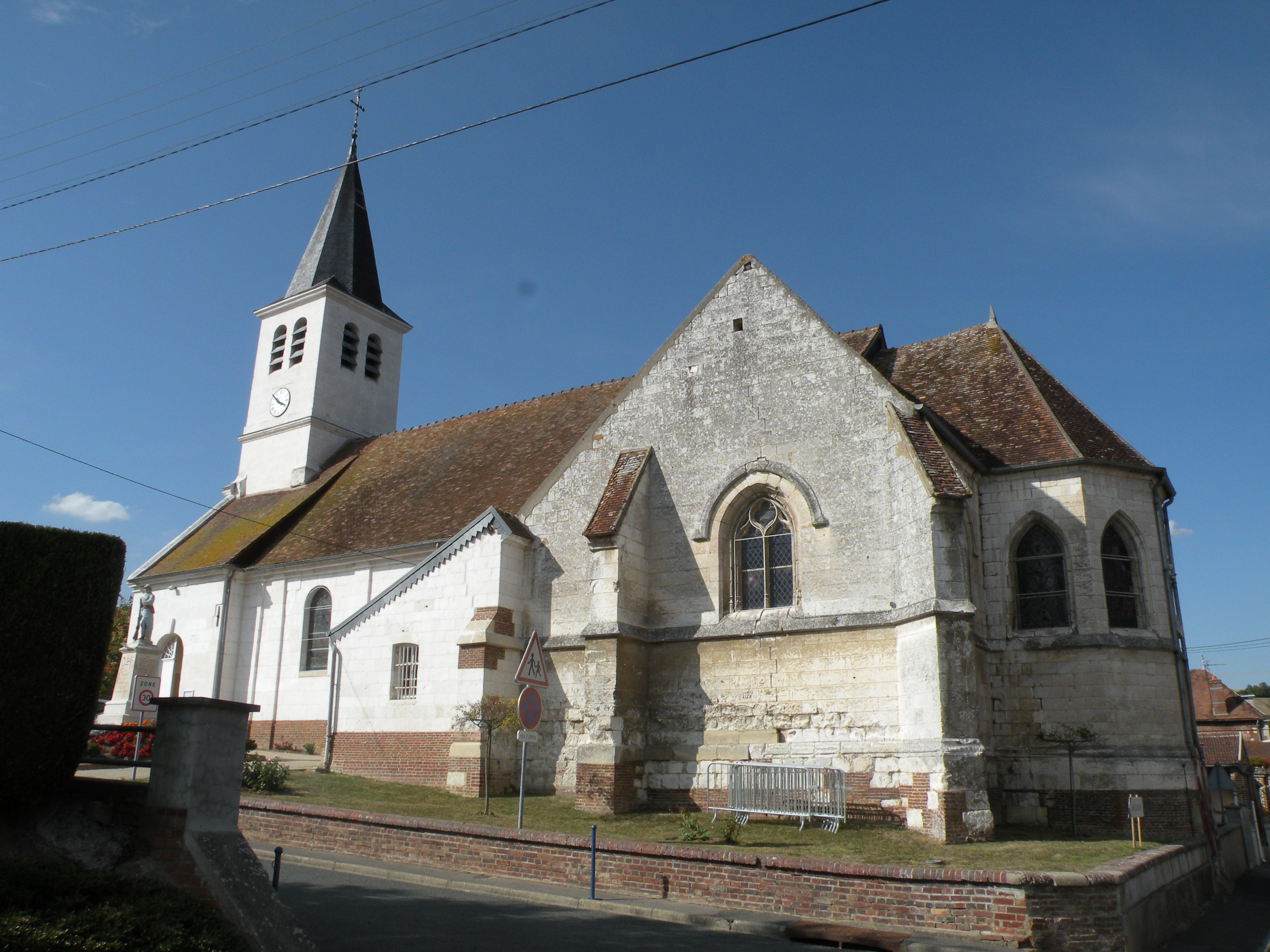
- The church in Goincourt
- Location of Goincourt
- Location within France Location within Hauts-de-France
- Coordinates: 49°25′37″N 2°02′13″E
- Country: France
- Region: Hauts-de-France
- Department: Oise
- Arrondissement: Beauvais
- Canton: Beauvais-2
- Intercommunality: CA Beauvaisis

Government
  - Mayor (2023–2026): Benoît Bonnellier
- Area^{1}: 6.52 km^{2} (2.52 sq mi)
- Elevation: 69 m (226 ft)
- Highest elevation: 173 m (568 ft)
- Lowest elevation: 67 m (220 ft)
- Population (2023): 1,552
  - Density: 238/km^{2} (617/sq mi)
- Time zone: UTC+01:00 (CET)
  - Summer (DST): UTC+02:00 (CEST)
- INSEE/Postal code: 60277 /60000
- ^{1} French Land Register data, which excludes lakes, ponds, glaciers > 1 km^{2} (0.386 sq mi or 247 acres) and river estuaries.

Goincourt (French pronunciation: [ɡwɛ̃kuʁ]) is a commune in the Oise department in northern France.

== See also ==
- Communes of the Oise department
