= Beaudéduit =

- Commune
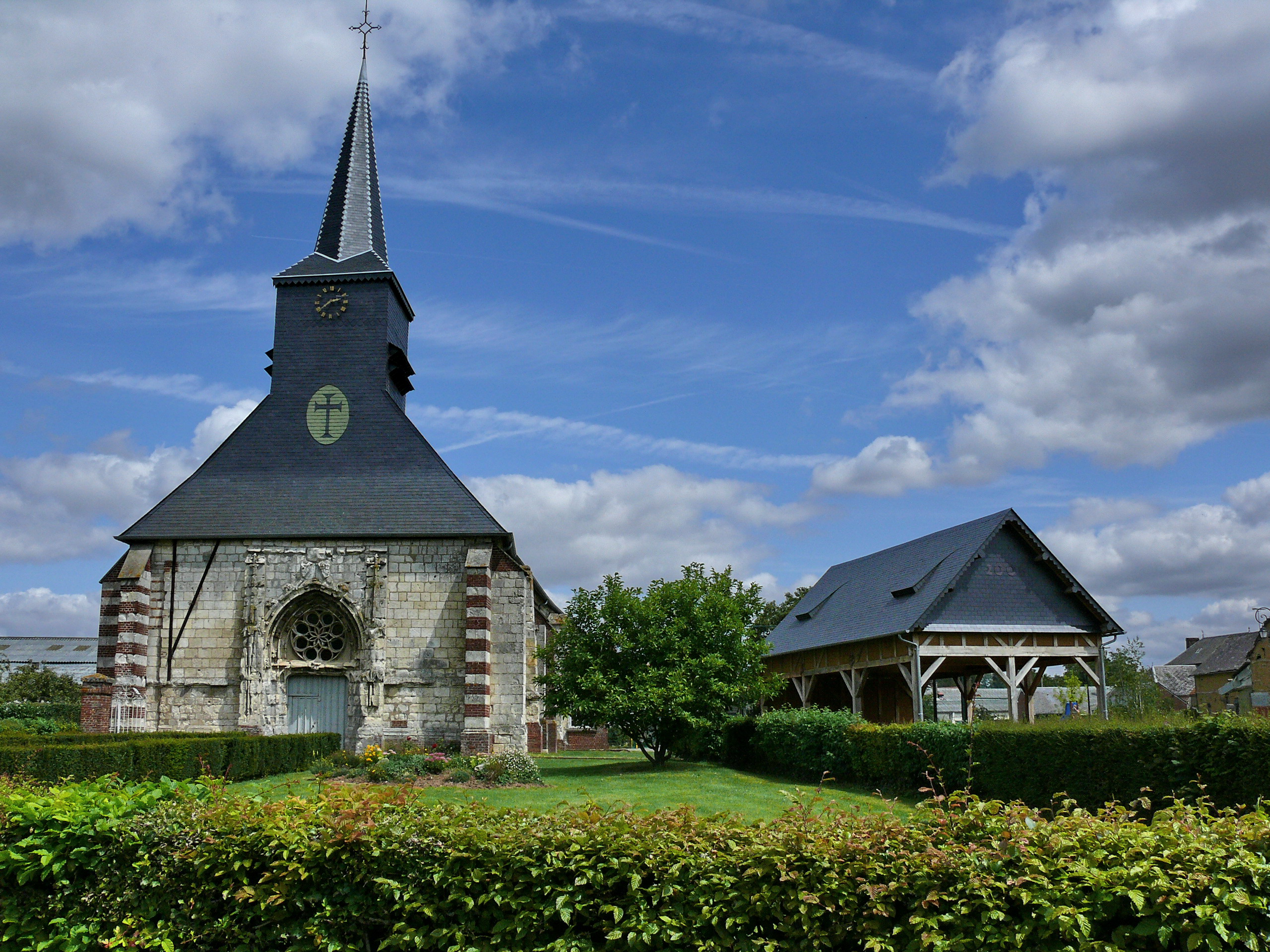
- The church in Beaudéduit
- Location of Beaudéduit
- Location within France Location within Hauts-de-France
- Coordinates: 49°40′48″N 2°03′57″E
- Country: France
- Region: Hauts-de-France
- Department: Oise
- Arrondissement: Beauvais
- Canton: Grandvilliers
- Intercommunality: Picardie Verte

Government
  - Mayor (2020–2026): Guy Masson
- Area^{1}: 3.72 km^{2} (1.44 sq mi)
- Elevation: 186 m (610 ft)
- Highest elevation: 187 m (614 ft)
- Lowest elevation: 110 m (360 ft)
- Population (2023): 173
  - Density: 46.5/km^{2} (120/sq mi)
- Time zone: UTC+01:00 (CET)
  - Summer (DST): UTC+02:00 (CEST)
- INSEE/Postal code: 60051 /60210
- ^{1} French Land Register data, which excludes lakes, ponds, glaciers > 1 km^{2} (0.386 sq mi or 247 acres) and river estuaries.

Beaudéduit (French pronunciation: [bodedɥi]) is a commune in the Oise department in northern France.

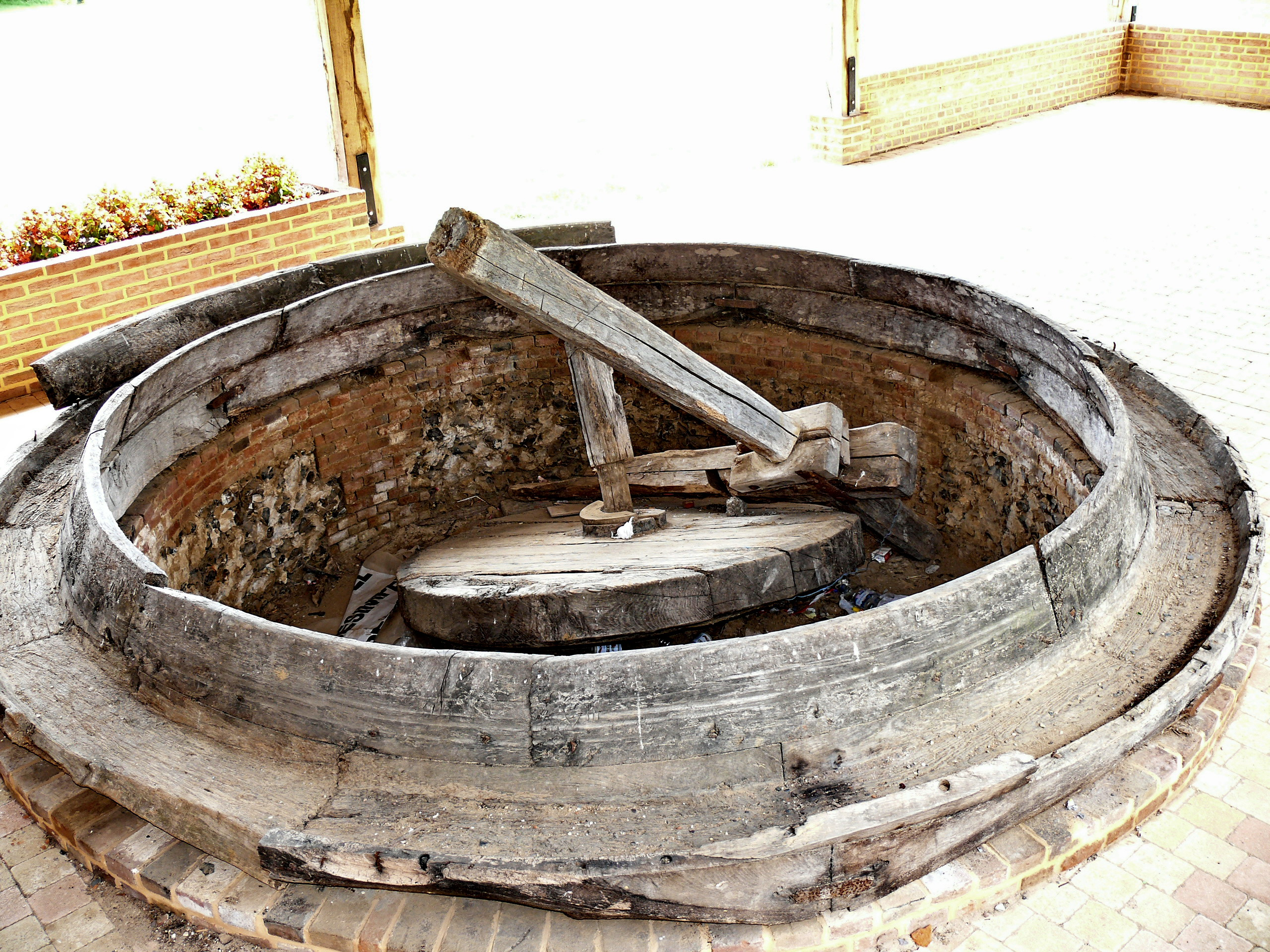
Old cider press, located in the local church

== Population ==
Historical population
Year	Pop.	±% p.a.
1968	220	—
1975	216	−0.26%
1982	181	−2.49%
1990	156	−1.84%
1999	169	+0.89%
2007	182	+0.93%
2012	196	+1.49%
2017	204	+0.80%
2023	173	−2.71%
Source: INSEE

== See also ==
- Communes of the Oise department
