= Porcheux =

- Commune
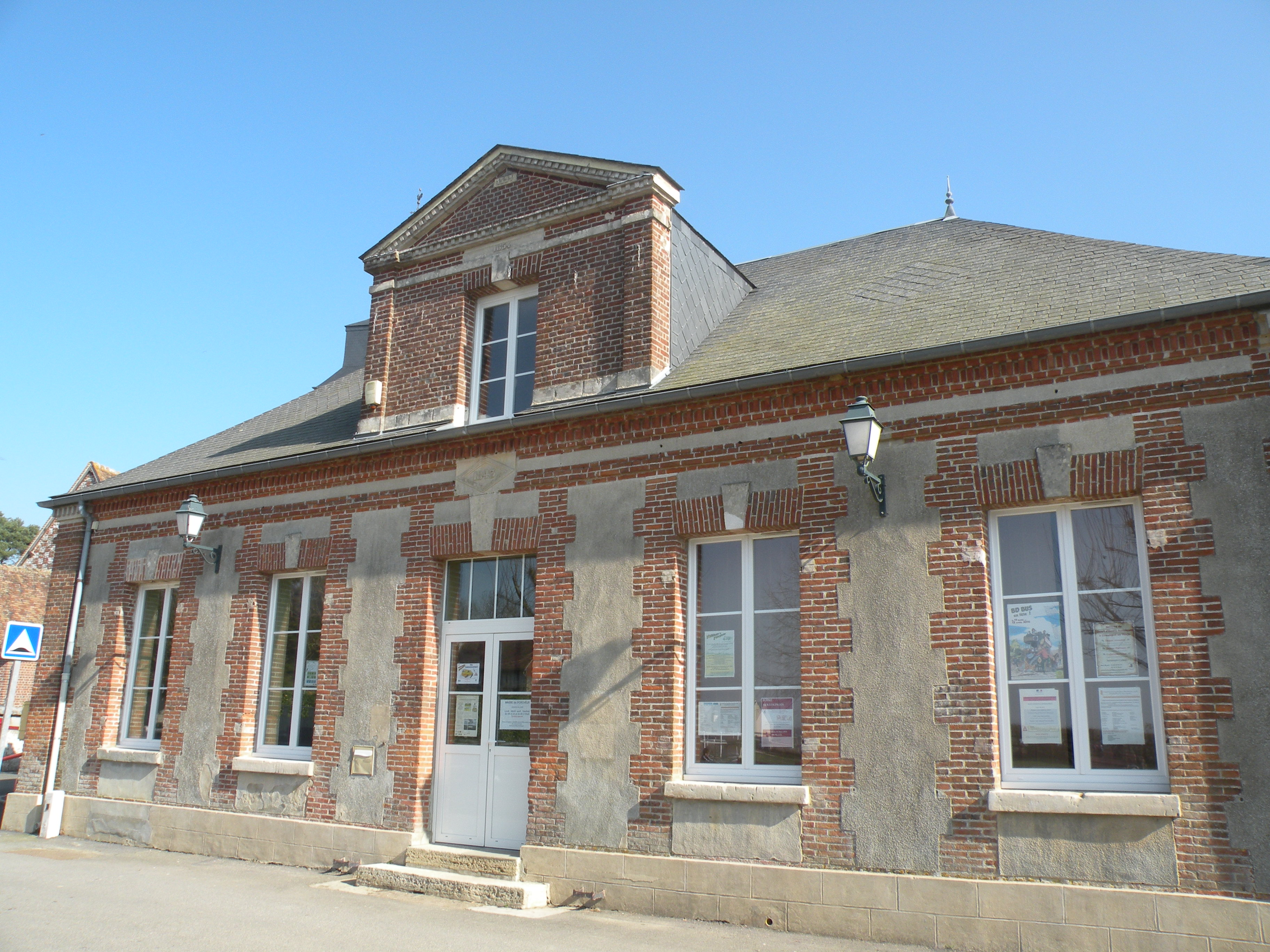
- The town hall in Porcheux
- Location of Porcheux
- Location within France Location within Hauts-de-France
- Coordinates: 49°19′59″N 1°55′32″E
- Country: France
- Region: Hauts-de-France
- Department: Oise
- Arrondissement: Beauvais
- Canton: Beauvais-2

Government
  - Mayor (2020–2026): Christiane Renault
- Area^{1}: 4.71 km^{2} (1.82 sq mi)
- Elevation: 194 m (636 ft)
- Highest elevation: 208 m (682 ft)
- Lowest elevation: 119 m (390 ft)
- Population (2023): 677
  - Density: 144/km^{2} (372/sq mi)
- Time zone: UTC+01:00 (CET)
  - Summer (DST): UTC+02:00 (CEST)
- INSEE/Postal code: 60510 /60390
- ^{1} French Land Register data, which excludes lakes, ponds, glaciers > 1 km^{2} (0.386 sq mi or 247 acres) and river estuaries.

Porcheux (French pronunciation: [pɔʁʃø]) is a commune in the Oise department in northern France.

== See also ==
- Communes of the Oise department
