= Saint-Aubin-en-Bray =

- Commune
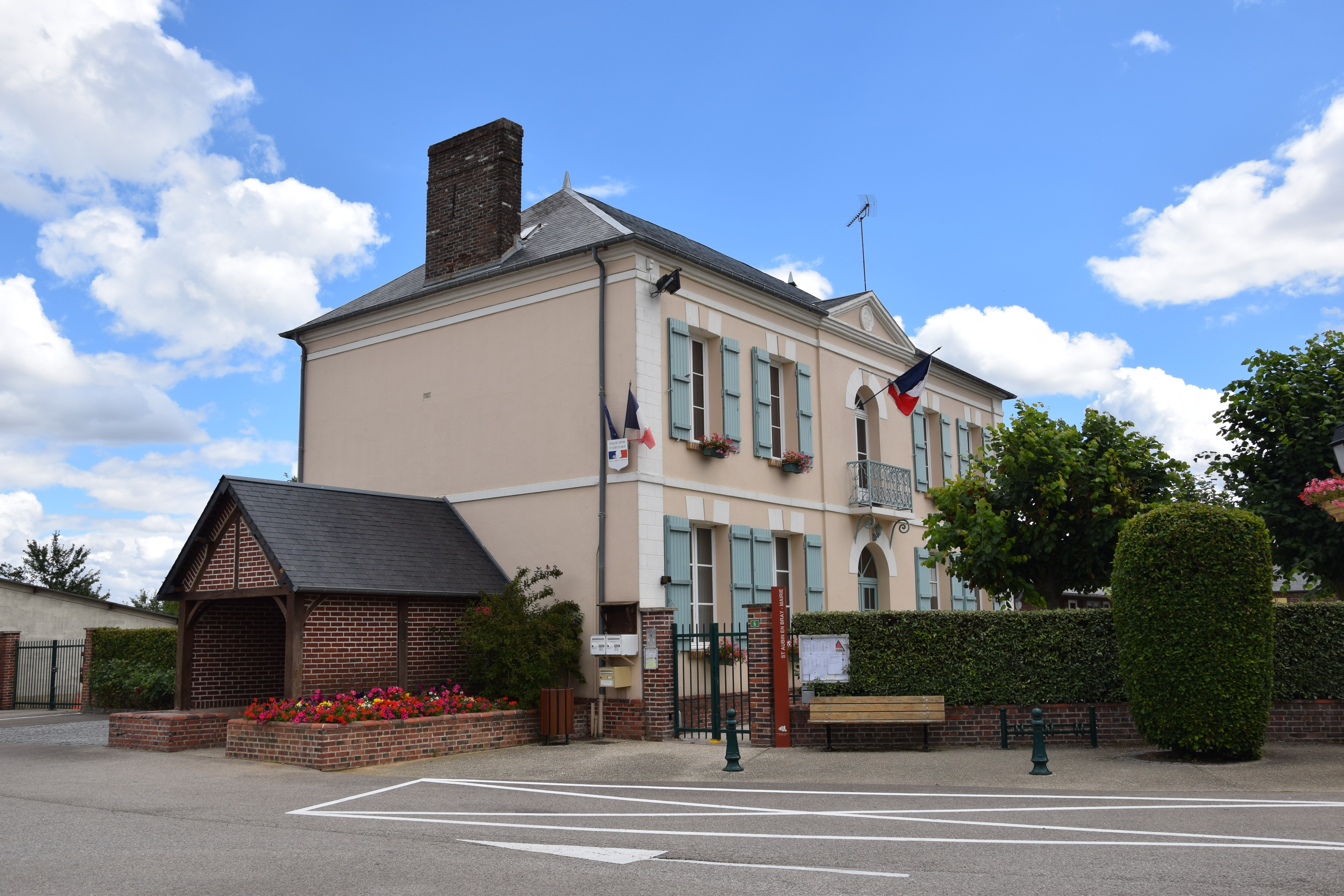
- The town hall in Saint-Aubin-en-Bray
- Location of Saint-Aubin-en-Bray
- Location within France Location within Hauts-de-France
- Coordinates: 49°25′13″N 1°52′45″E
- Country: France
- Region: Hauts-de-France
- Department: Oise
- Arrondissement: Beauvais
- Canton: Beauvais-2
- Intercommunality: Pays de Bray

Government
  - Mayor (2022–2026): Patrice Dufour
- Area^{1}: 6.38 km^{2} (2.46 sq mi)
- Elevation: 135 m (443 ft)
- Highest elevation: 231 m (758 ft)
- Lowest elevation: 83 m (272 ft)
- Population (2023): 1,174
  - Density: 184/km^{2} (477/sq mi)
- Time zone: UTC+01:00 (CET)
  - Summer (DST): UTC+02:00 (CEST)
- INSEE/Postal code: 60567 /60650
- ^{1} French Land Register data, which excludes lakes, ponds, glaciers > 1 km^{2} (0.386 sq mi or 247 acres) and river estuaries.

Saint-Aubin-en-Bray (French pronunciation: [sɛ̃.t‿obɛ̃ ɑ̃ bʁɛ], literally Saint-Aubin in Bray) is a commune in the Oise department in northern France.

== See also ==
- Communes of the Oise department
