= Communes of the Oise department =

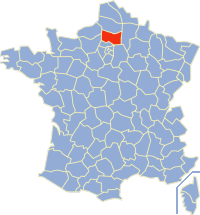

The following is a list of the 680 communes of the Oise department of France.

The communes cooperate in the following intercommunalities (as of 2025):

- Communauté d'agglomération du Beauvaisis
- Communauté d'agglomération de la Région de Compiègne et de la Basse Automne
- Communauté d'agglomération Creil Sud Oise
- Communauté de communes de l'Aire Cantilienne
- Communauté de communes du Clermontois
- Communauté de communes des Deux Vallées
- Communauté de communes du Liancourtois
- Communauté de communes des Lisières de l'Oise
- Communauté de communes de l'Oise Picarde
- Communauté de communes du Pays de Bray
- Communauté de communes du Pays Noyonnais
- Communauté de communes des Pays d'Oise et d'Halatte
- Communauté de communes du Pays des Sources
- Communauté de communes du Pays de Valois
- Communauté de communes de la Picardie verte
- Communauté de communes de la Plaine d'Estrées
- Communauté de communes du Plateau Picard
- Communauté de communes des Sablons
- Communauté de communes Senlis Sud Oise
- Communauté de communes Thelloise
- Communauté de communes du Vexin-Thelle

INSEE code	Postal code	Commune
60001	60220	Abancourt
60002	60430	Abbecourt
60003	60480	Abbeville-Saint-Lucien
60004	60690	Achy
60005	60620	Acy-en-Multien
60006	60700	Les Ageux
60007	60600	Agnetz
60008	60600	Airion
60009	60000	Allonne
60010	60110	Amblainville
60011	60310	Amy
60012	60570	Andeville
60013	60940	Angicourt
60014	60130	Angivillers
60015	60250	Angy
60016	60250	Ansacq
60017	60120	Ansauvillers
60019	60162	Antheuil-Portes
60020	60620	Antilly
60021	60400	Appilly
60022	60300	Apremont
60023	60880	Armancourt
60024	60190	Arsy
60025	60350	Attichy
60026	60360	Auchy-la-Montagne
60027	60800	Auger-Saint-Vincent
60028	60300	Aumont-en-Halatte
60029	60390	Auneuil
60030	60390	Auteuil
60031	60890	Autheuil-en-Valois
60032	60350	Autrêches
60033	60300	Avilly-Saint-Léonard
60034	60130	Avrechy
60035	60310	Avricourt
60036	60190	Avrigny
60037	60400	Babœuf
60039	60120	Bacouël
60040	60190	Bailleul-le-Soc
60041	60930	Bailleul-sur-Thérain
60042	60140	Bailleval
60043	60170	Bailly
60044	60250	Balagny-sur-Thérain
60045	60810	Barbery
60046	60620	Bargny
60047	60300	Baron
60048	60113	Baugy
60049	60380	Bazancourt
60050	60700	Bazicourt
60051	60210	Beaudéduit
60052	60640	Beaugies-sous-Bois
60053	60310	Beaulieu-les-Fontaines
60054		Beaumont-les-Nonains
60055	60400	Beaurains-lès-Noyon
60056	60700	Beaurepaire
60057	60000	Beauvais
60058	60120	Beauvoir
60059	60400	Béhéricourt
60060	60540	Belle-Église
60061	60490	Belloy
60062	60640	Berlancourt
60063	60390	Berneuil-en-Bray
60064	60350	Berneuil-sur-Aisne
60065	60370	Berthecourt
60066	60129	Béthancourt-en-Valois
60067	60320	Béthisy-Saint-Martin
60068	60320	Béthisy-Saint-Pierre
60069	60620	Betz
60070	60280	Bienville
60071	60490	Biermont
60072	60350	Bitry
60073	60650	Blacourt
60074	60460	Blaincourt-lès-Précy
60075	60120	Blancfossé
60076	60220	Blargies
60077	60860	Blicourt
60078	60190	Blincourt
60079	60440	Boissy-Fresnoy
60081	60510	Bonlier
60083	60123	Bonneuil-en-Valois
60082	60120	Bonneuil-les-Eaux
60084	60112	Bonnières
60085	60120	Bonvillers
60086	60820	Boran-sur-Oise
60087	60300	Borest
60088	60540	Bornel
60089	60240	Boubiers
60090	60240	Bouconvillers
60091	60620	Bouillancy
60092	60620	Boullarre
60093	60490	Boulogne-la-Grasse
60094	60141	Boursonne
60095	60240	Boury-en-Vexin
60097	60590	Boutencourt
60098	60220	Bouvresse
60099	60113	Braisnes-sur-Aronde
60100	60810	Brasseuse
60101	60440	Brégy
60102	60870	Brenouille
60103	60510	Bresles
60104	60120	Breteuil
60105	60400	Brétigny
60106	60840	Breuil-le-Sec
60107	60600	Breuil-le-Vert
60108	60210	Briot
60109	60210	Brombos
60110	60220	Broquiers
60111	60120	Broyes
60112	60130	Brunvillers-la-Motte
60113	60480	Bucamps
60114	60380	Buicourt
60115	60130	Bulles
60116	60250	Bury
60117	60400	Bussy
60118	60400	Caisnes
60120	60290	Cambronne-lès-Clermont
60119	60170	Cambronne-lès-Ribécourt
60121	60640	Campagne
60122	60220	Campeaux
60123	60480	Campremy
60124	60310	Candor
60125	60680	Canly
60126	60310	Cannectancourt
60127	60310	Canny-sur-Matz
60128	60220	Canny-sur-Thérain
60129	60170	Carlepont
60130	60840	Catenoy
60131	60360	Catheux
60132	60640	Catigny
60133	60130	Catillon-Fumechon
60134	60290	Cauffry
60135	60730	Cauvigny
60136	60210	Cempuis
60137	60190	Cernoy
60138	60300	Chamant
60139	60230	Chambly
60140	60240	Chambors
60141	60500	Chantilly
60142	60520	La Chapelle-en-Serval
60143	60240	Chaumont-en-Vexin
60144	60240	Chavençon
60145	60350	Chelles
60146	60120	Chepoix
60147	60150	Chevincourt
60148	60440	Chèvreville
60149	60710	Chevrières
60150	60138	Chiry-Ourscamp
60151	60750	Choisy-au-Bac
60152	60190	Choisy-la-Victoire
60153	60360	Choqueuse-les-Bénards
60154	60940	Cinqueux
60155	60660	Cires-lès-Mello
60156	60280	Clairoix
60157	60600	Clermont
60158	60420	Coivrel
60159	60200	Compiègne
60160	60490	Conchy-les-Pots
60161	60360	Conteville
60162	60110	Corbeil-Cerf
60163	60120	Cormeilles
60209	60240	La Corne-en-Vexin
60164	60850	Le Coudray-Saint-Germer
60165	60790	Le Coudray-sur-Thelle
60166	60150	Coudun
60167	60350	Couloisy
60168	60420	Courcelles-Epayelles
60169	60240	Courcelles-lès-Gisors
60170	60300	Courteuil
60171	60350	Courtieux
60172	60580	Coye-la-Forêt
60173	60660	Cramoisy
60174	60310	Crapeaumesnil
60175	60100	Creil
60176	60800	Crépy-en-Valois
60177	60190	Cressonsacq
60178	60360	Crèvecœur-le-Grand
60179	60420	Crèvecœur-le-Petit
60180	60112	Crillon
60181	60400	Crisolles
60182	60120	Le Crocq
60183	60120	Croissy-sur-Celle
60184	60350	Croutoy
60185	60530	Crouy-en-Thelle
60186	60130	Cuignières
60187	60850	Cuigy-en-Bray
60188	60350	Cuise-la-Motte
60189	60400	Cuts
60190	60620	Cuvergnon
60191	60490	Cuvilly
60192	60310	Cuy
60193	60210	Daméraucourt
60194	60210	Dargies
60195	60240	Delincourt
60197	60530	Dieudonné
60198	60310	Dives
60199	60360	Doméliers
60200	60420	Domfront
60201	60420	Dompierre
60196	60790	La Drenne
60203	60800	Duvy
60204	60310	Écuvilly
60205	60210	Élencourt
60206	60157	Élincourt-Sainte-Marguerite
60207	60123	Éméville
60208	60590	Énencourt-Léage
60210	60190	Épineuse
60211	60590	Éragny-sur-Epte
60212	60530	Ercuis
60213	60950	Ermenonville
60214	60380	Ernemont-Boutavent
60215	60600	Erquery
60216	60130	Erquinvillers
60217	60380	Escames
60218	60110	Esches
60219	60220	Escles-Saint-Pierre
60220	60650	Espaubourg
60221	60120	Esquennoy
60222	60510	Essuiles
60223	60190	Estrées-Saint-Denis
60224	60620	Étavigny
60225	60600	Étouy
60226	60330	Ève
60227	60310	Évricourt
60229	60680	Le Fayel
60228	60240	Fay-les-Étangs
60230	60510	Le Fay-Saint-Quentin
60231	60800	Feigneux
60232	60420	Ferrières
60233	60960	Feuquières
60234	60600	Fitz-James
60235	60590	Flavacourt
60236	60640	Flavy-le-Meldeux
60237	60120	Fléchy
60238	60700	Fleurines
60239	60240	Fleury
60240	60360	Fontaine-Bonneleau
60241	60300	Fontaine-Chaalis
60242	60690	Fontaine-Lavaganne
60243	60480	Fontaine-Saint-Lucien
60244	60380	Fontenay-Torcy
60245	60220	Formerie
60247	60190	Fouilleuse
60248	60220	Fouilloy
60249	60250	Foulangues
60250	60000	Fouquenies
60251	60510	Fouquerolles
60252	60130	Fournival
60253	60480	Francastel
60254	60190	Francières
60255	60640	Fréniches
60257	60240	Fresne-Léguillon
60258	60310	Fresnières
60259	60530	Fresnoy-en-Thelle
60260	60127	Fresnoy-la-Rivière
60261	60800	Fresnoy-le-Luat
60262	60420	Le Frestoy-Vaux
60263	60640	Frétoy-le-Château
60264	60000	Frocourt
60265	60480	Froissy
60267	60360	Le Gallet
60268	60120	Gannes
60269	60210	Gaudechart
60270	60400	Genvry
60271	60380	Gerberoy
60272	60129	Gilocourt
60273	60150	Giraumont
60274	60129	Glaignes
60275	60650	Glatigny
60276	60420	Godenvillers
60277	60000	Goincourt
60278	60640	Golancourt
60279	60117	Gondreville
60280	60220	Gourchelles
60281	60190	Gournay-sur-Aronde
60282	60270	Gouvieux
60283	60120	Gouy-les-Groseillers
60284	60680	Grandfresnoy
60287	60400	Grandrû
60285	60190	Grandvillers-aux-Bois
60286	60210	Grandvilliers
60288	60380	Grémévillers
60289	60210	Grez
60290	60480	Guignecourt
60291	60640	Guiscard
60292	60310	Gury
60293	60240	Hadancourt-le-Haut-Clocher
60294	60490	Hainvillers
60295	60210	Halloy
60297	60210	Le Hamel
60296	60650	Hannaches
60298	60650	Hanvoile
60299	60120	Hardivillers
60301	60112	Haucourt
60302	60510	Haudivillers
60303	60210	Hautbos
60304	60690	Haute-Épine
60305	60350	Hautefontaine
60694	60390	Les Hauts-Talican
60306	60380	Hécourt
60307	60250	Heilles
60308	60190	Hémévillers
60309	60119	Hénonville
60310	60112	Herchies
60311	60120	La Hérelle
60312	60380	Héricourt-sur-Thérain
60313	60370	Hermes
60314	60360	Hétomesnil
60315	60650	Hodenc-en-Bray
60316	60430	Hodenc-l'Évêque
60317	60250	Hondainville
60318	60710	Houdancourt
60319	60390	La Houssoye
60320	60141	Ivors
60321	60173	Ivry-le-Temple
60322	60240	Jaméricourt
60323	60150	Janville
60324	60350	Jaulzy
60325	60880	Jaux
60326	60680	Jonquières
60327	60240	Jouy-sous-Thelle
60328	60112	Juvignies
60329	60310	Laberlière
60330	60570	Laboissière-en-Thelle
60331	60590	Labosse
60332	60140	Labruyère
60333	60650	Lachapelle-aux-Pots
60334	60730	Lachapelle-Saint-Pierre
60335	60380	Lachapelle-sous-Gerberoy
60336	60480	Lachaussée-du-Bois-d'Écu
60337	60190	Lachelle
60338	60610	Lacroix-Saint-Ouen
60339	60510	Lafraye
60340	60310	Lagny
60341	60330	Lagny-le-Sec
60342	60290	Laigneville
60343	60590	Lalande-en-Son
60344	60850	Lalandelle
60345	60600	Lamécourt
60346	60260	Lamorlaye
60347	60220	Lannoy-Cuillère
60348	60400	Larbroye
60350	60310	Lassigny
60351	60490	Lataule

INSEE code	Postal code	Commune
60352	60240	Lattainville
60353	60120	Lavacquerie
60354	60210	Laverrière
60355	60510	Laversines
60356	60240	Lavilletertre
60357	60420	Léglantiers
60358	60800	Lévignen
60359	60650	Lhéraule
60360	60140	Liancourt
60361	60240	Liancourt-Saint-Pierre
60362	60640	Libermont
60363	60240	Lierville
60364	60130	Lieuvillers
60365	60360	Lihus
60366	60510	Litz
60367	60240	Loconville
60368	60150	Longueil-Annel
60369	60126	Longueil-Sainte-Marie
60370	60110	Lormaison
60371	60380	Loueuse
60372	60360	Luchy
60373	60150	Machemont
60374	60420	Maignelay-Montigny
60375	60600	Maimbeville
60376	60112	Maisoncelle-Saint-Pierre
60377	60480	Maisoncelle-Tuilerie
60703	60000	Aux Marais
60378	60490	Marest-sur-Matz
60379	60490	Mareuil-la-Motte
60380	60890	Mareuil-sur-Ourcq
60381	60310	Margny-aux-Cerises
60382	60280	Margny-lès-Compiègne
60383	60490	Margny-sur-Matz
60385	60890	Marolles
60386	60490	Marquéglise
60387	60690	Marseille-en-Beauvaisis
60388	60112	Martincourt
60389	60640	Maucourt
60390	60480	Maulers
60391	60660	Maysel
60392	60150	Mélicocq
60393	60660	Mello
60394	60420	Ménévillers
60395	60110	Méru
60396	60420	Méry-la-Bataille
60397	60210	Le Mesnil-Conteville
60398	60530	Le Mesnil-en-Thelle
60399	60120	Le Mesnil-Saint-Firmin
60400	60130	Le Mesnil-sur-Bulles
60401	60240	Le Mesnil-Théribus
60402	60880	Le Meux
60403	60112	Milly-sur-Thérain
60404	60140	Mogneville
60405	60220	Moliens
60406	60940	Monceaux
60407	60220	Monceaux-l'Abbaye
60408	60113	Monchy-Humières
60409	60290	Monchy-Saint-Éloi
60410	60400	Mondescourt
60411	60240	Monneville
60412	60240	Montagny-en-Vexin
60413	60950	Montagny-Sainte-Félicité
60414	60160	Montataire
60256	60240	Montchevreuil
60415	60810	Montépilloy
60416	60420	Montgérain
60418	60190	Montiers
60420	60240	Montjavoult
60421	60300	Mont-l'Évêque
60422	60300	Montlognon
60423	60150	Montmacq
60424	60190	Montmartin
60425	60480	Montreuil-sur-Brêche
60426	60134	Montreuil-sur-Thérain
60427	60119	Monts
60428	60650	Le Mont-Saint-Adrien
60429	60530	Morangles
60430	60127	Morienval
60431	60400	Morlincourt
60432	60128	Mortefontaine
60433	60570	Mortefontaine-en-Thelle
60434	60490	Mortemer
60435	60380	Morvillers
60436	60120	Mory-Montcrux
60437	60250	Mouchy-le-Châtel
60438	60350	Moulin-sous-Touvent
60439	60250	Mouy
60440	60190	Moyenneville
60441	60190	Moyvillers
60442	60480	Muidorge
60443	60640	Muirancourt
60444	60220	Mureaumont
60445	60400	Nampcel
60446	60440	Nanteuil-le-Haudouin
60447	60320	Néry
60448	60890	Neufchelles
60449	60190	Neufvy-sur-Aronde
60450	60530	Neuilly-en-Thelle
60451	60290	Neuilly-sous-Clermont
60452	60119	Neuville-Bosc
60454	60510	La Neuville-en-Hez
60456	60190	La Neuville-Roy
60457	60480	La Neuville-Saint-Pierre
60458	60690	La Neuville-sur-Oudeuil
60459	60490	La Neuville-sur-Ressons
60460	60112	La Neuville-Vault
60461	60510	Nivillers
60462	60430	Noailles
60463	60180	Nogent-sur-Oise
60464	60840	Nointel
60465	60480	Noirémont
60466	60130	Noroy
60468	60130	Nourard-le-Franc
60469	60730	Novillers
60470	60480	Noyers-Saint-Martin
60471	60400	Noyon
60472	60210	Offoy
60473	60440	Ognes
60474	60310	Ognolles
60476	60220	Omécourt
60477	60650	Ons-en-Bray
60478	60620	Ormoy-le-Davien
60479	60800	Ormoy-Villers
60480	60510	Oroër
60481	60129	Orrouy
60482	60560	Orry-la-Ville
60483	60490	Orvillers-Sorel
60484	60860	Oudeuil
60485	60480	Oursel-Maison
60486	60120	Paillart
60487	60240	Parnes
60488	60400	Passel
60489	60440	Péroy-les-Gombries
60490	60112	Pierrefitte-en-Beauvaisis
60491	60350	Pierrefonds
60492	60170	Pimprez
60493	60860	Pisseleu
60494	60128	Plailly
60495	60130	Plainval
60496	60120	Plainville
60497	60130	Le Plessier-sur-Bulles
60498	60130	Le Plessier-sur-Saint-Just
60500	60330	Le Plessis-Belleville
60501	60150	Le Plessis-Brion
60499	60310	Plessis-de-Roye
60502	60640	Le Plessis-Patte-d'Oie
60503	60420	Le Ployron
60504	60430	Ponchon
60505	60520	Pontarmé
60506	60400	Pont-l'Évêque
60507	60400	Pontoise-lès-Noyon
60508	60700	Pontpoint
60509	60700	Pont-Sainte-Maxence
60510	60390	Porcheux
60511	60400	Porquéricourt
60512	60790	Pouilly
60513	60460	Précy-sur-Oise
60514	60360	Prévillers
60515	60190	Pronleroy
60516	60850	Puiseux-en-Bray
60517	60540	Puiseux-le-Hauberger
60518	60480	Puits-la-Vallée
60519	60640	Quesmy
60520	60480	Le Quesnel-Aubry
60521	60220	Quincampoix-Fleuzy
60522	60130	Quinquempoix
60523	60155	Rainvillers
60524	60290	Rantigny
60525	60810	Raray
60526	60130	Ravenel
60527	60620	Réez-Fosse-Martin
60528	60240	Reilly
60529	60600	Rémécourt
60530	60510	Rémérangles
60531	60190	Remy
60533	60490	Ressons-sur-Matz
60534	60153	Rethondes
60535	60480	Reuil-sur-Brêche
60536	60410	Rhuis
60537	60170	Ribécourt-Dreslincourt
60538	60490	Ricquebourg
60539	60870	Rieux
60540	60126	Rivecourt
60541	60410	Roberval
60542	60510	Rochy-Condé
60543	60800	Rocquemont
60544	60120	Rocquencourt
60545	60220	Romescamps
60546	60440	Rosières
60547	60140	Rosoy
60548	60620	Rosoy-en-Multien
60549	60360	Rotangy
60550	60690	Rothois
60551	60660	Rousseloy
60552	60800	Rouville
60553	60190	Rouvillers
60554	60620	Rouvres-en-Multien
60555	60120	Rouvroy-les-Merles
60556	60420	Royaucourt
60557	60690	Roy-Boissy
60558	60310	Roye-sur-Matz
60559	60510	La Rue-Saint-Pierre
60560	60810	Rully
60561	60117	Russy-Bémont
60562	60700	Sacy-le-Grand
60563	60190	Sacy-le-Petit
60564	60420	Sains-Morainvillers
60565	60480	Saint-André-Farivillers
60566	60220	Saint-Arnoult
60567	60650	Saint-Aubin-en-Bray
60568	60600	Saint-Aubin-sous-Erquery
60569	60170	Saint-Crépin-aux-Bois
60570	60149	Saint-Crépin-Ibouvillers
60571	60380	Saint-Deniscourt
60573	60480	Sainte-Eusoye
60575	60730	Sainte-Geneviève
60572	60350	Saint-Étienne-Roilaye
60574	60370	Saint-Félix
60576	60650	Saint-Germain-la-Poterie
60577	60850	Saint-Germer-de-Fly
60578	60410	Saintines
60579	60350	Saint-Jean-aux-Bois
60581	60130	Saint-Just-en-Chaussée
60582	60170	Saint-Léger-aux-Bois
60583	60155	Saint-Léger-en-Bray
60584	60340	Saint-Leu-d'Esserent
60585	60420	Saint-Martin-aux-Bois
60586	60000	Saint-Martin-le-Nœud
60587	60700	Saint-Martin-Longueau
60588	60210	Saint-Maur
60589	60740	Saint-Maximin
60590	60860	Saint-Omer-en-Chaussée
60591	60650	Saint-Paul
60592	60850	Saint-Pierre-es-Champs
60593	60350	Saint-Pierre-lès-Bitry
60594	60380	Saint-Quentin-des-Prés
60595	60130	Saint-Remy-en-l'Eau
60596	60220	Saint-Samson-la-Poterie
60597	60320	Saint-Sauveur
60598	60430	Saint-Sulpice
60599	60210	Saint-Thibault
60600	60410	Saint-Vaast-de-Longmont
60601	60660	Saint-Vaast-lès-Mello
60602	60220	Saint-Valery
60603	60400	Salency
60604	60210	Sarcus
60605	60210	Sarnois
60608	60360	Le Saulchoy
60609	60650	Savignies
60610	60400	Sempigny
60611	60650	Senantes
60612	60300	Senlis
60613	60240	Senots
60614	60240	Serans
60615	60120	Sérévillers
60616	60590	Sérifontaine
60617	60400	Sermaize
60618	60800	Séry-Magneval
60619	60330	Silly-le-Long
60620	60430	Silly-Tillard
60621	60310	Solente
60622	60210	Sommereux
60623	60380	Songeons
60624	60380	Sully
60625	60400	Suzoy
60626	60590	Talmontiers
60627	60120	Tartigny
60628	60510	Therdonne
60629	60380	Thérines
60630	60240	Thibivillers
60631	60520	Thiers-sur-Thève
60632	60310	Thiescourt
60633	60210	Thieuloy-Saint-Antoine
60634	60480	Thieux
60635	60160	Thiverny
60636	60150	Thourotte
60637	60890	Thury-en-Valois
60638	60250	Thury-sous-Clermont
60639	60000	Tillé
60640	60240	Tourly
60641	60170	Tracy-le-Mont
60642	60170	Tracy-le-Val
60643	60420	Tricot
60644	60590	Trie-Château
60645	60590	Trie-la-Ville
60646	60112	Troissereux
60647	60350	Trosly-Breuil
60648	60120	Troussencourt
60650	60800	Trumilly
60651	60730	Ully-Saint-Georges
60652	60790	Valdampierre
60653	60130	Valescourt
60654	60490	Vandélicourt
60655	60400	Varesnes
60656	60890	Varinfroy
60657	60400	Vauchelles
60658	60117	Vauciennes
60659	60240	Vaudancourt
60660	60590	Le Vaumain
60661	60117	Vaumoise
60662	60390	Le Vauroux
60663	60510	Velennes
60664	60120	Vendeuil-Caply
60665	60280	Venette
60667	60410	Verberie
60668	60112	Verderel-lès-Sauqueuse
60669	60140	Verderonne
60670	60550	Verneuil-en-Halatte
60671	60440	Versigny
60666	60950	Ver-sur-Launette
60672	60117	Vez
60673	60360	Viefvillers
60674	60350	Vieux-Moulin
60675	60162	Vignemont
60676	60400	Ville
60677	60650	Villembray
60678	60175	Villeneuve-les-Sablons
60679	60890	La Villeneuve-sous-Thury
60680	60410	Villeneuve-sur-Verberie
60681	60650	Villers-Saint-Barthélemy
60682	60810	Villers-Saint-Frambourg-Ognon
60683	60620	Villers-Saint-Genest
60684	60870	Villers-Saint-Paul
60685	60134	Villers-Saint-Sépulcre
60686	60340	Villers-sous-Saint-Leu
60687	60650	Villers-sur-Auchy
60688	60860	Villers-sur-Bonnières
60689	60150	Villers-sur-Coudun
60691	60380	Villers-Vermont
60692	60120	Villers-Vicomte
60693	60640	Villeselve
60695	60500	Vineuil-Saint-Firmin
60697	60112	Vrocourt
60698	60420	Wacquemoulin
60699	60380	Wambez
60700	60430	Warluis
60701	60130	Wavignies
60702	60420	Welles-Pérennes
