= Lachapelle-aux-Pots =

- Commune
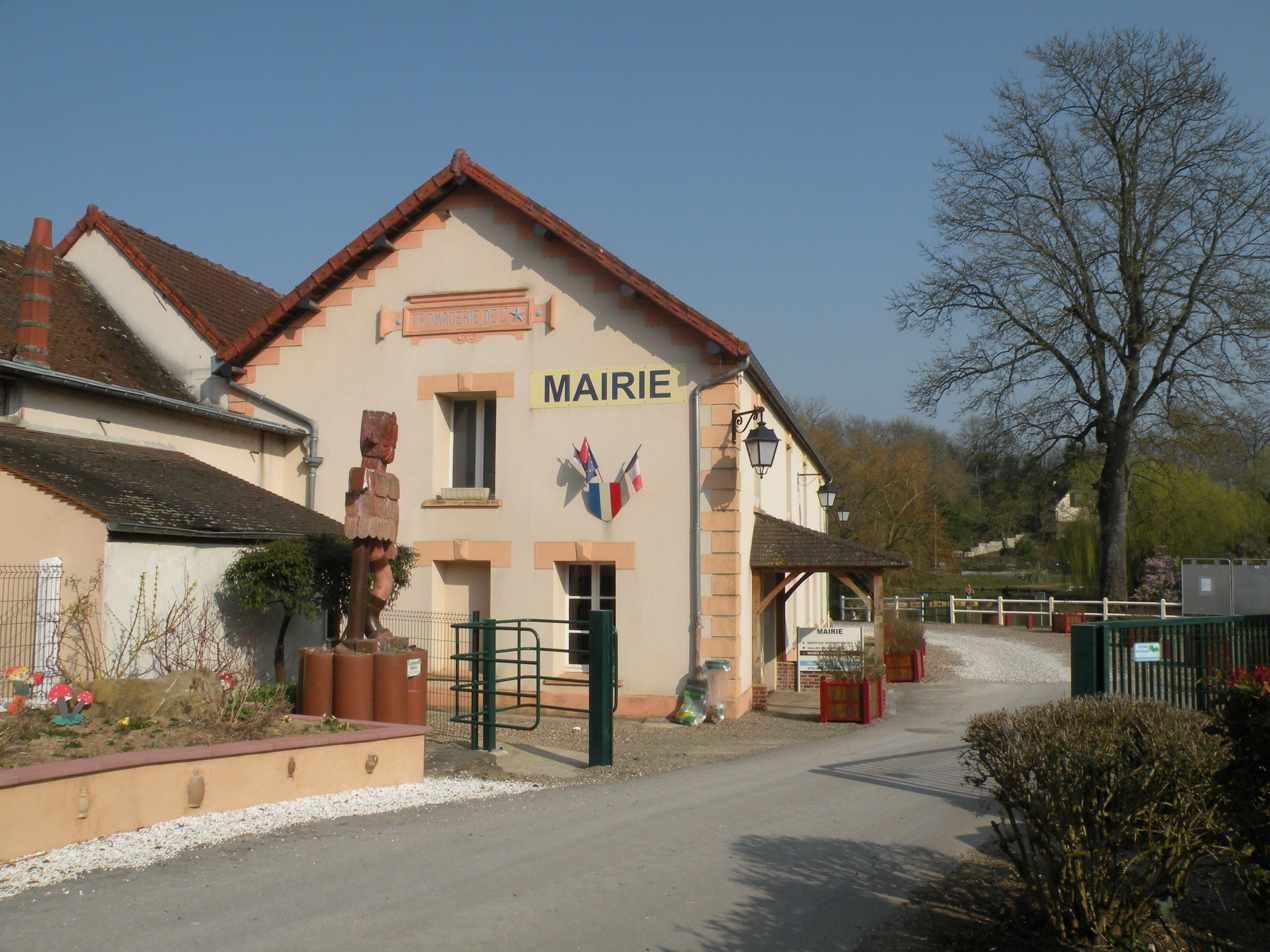
- The town hall in Lachapelle-aux-Pots

- Coat of arms
- Location of Lachapelle-aux-Pots
- Location within France Location within Hauts-de-France
- Coordinates: 49°26′59″N 1°54′11″E
- Country: France
- Region: Hauts-de-France
- Department: Oise
- Arrondissement: Beauvais
- Canton: Beauvais-2
- Intercommunality: Pays de Bray

Government
  - Mayor (2020–2026): Alain Magnoux
- Area^{1}: 9.85 km^{2} (3.80 sq mi)
- Elevation: 109 m (358 ft)
- Highest elevation: 176 m (577 ft)
- Lowest elevation: 77 m (253 ft)
- Population (2023): 1,512
  - Density: 154/km^{2} (398/sq mi)
- Time zone: UTC+01:00 (CET)
  - Summer (DST): UTC+02:00 (CEST)
- INSEE/Postal code: 60333 /60650
- ^{1} French Land Register data, which excludes lakes, ponds, glaciers > 1 km^{2} (0.386 sq mi or 247 acres) and river estuaries.

Lachapelle-aux-Pots (French pronunciation: [laʃapɛl o po]) is a commune in the Oise department in northern France.

Birthplace in 1874 of the poet, musician, painter, and art critic Léon Leclère (Tristan Klingsor).

== See also ==
- Communes of the Oise department
