= Grez, Oise =

Grez
- Commune
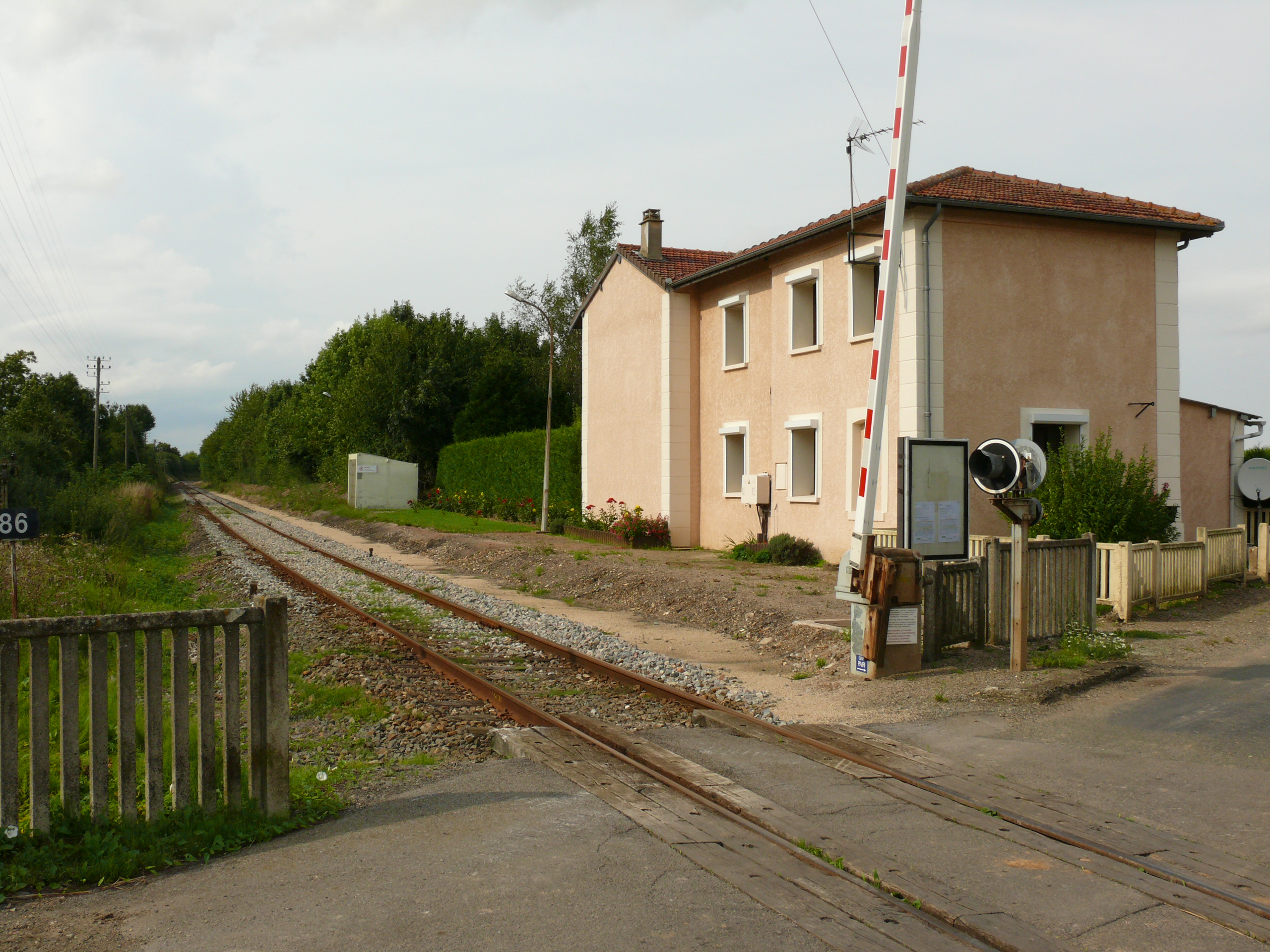
- The former railway station of Grez-Gaudechart
- Location of Grez
- Location within France Location within Hauts-de-France
- Coordinates: 49°38′25″N 1°58′44″E
- Country: France
- Region: Hauts-de-France
- Department: Oise
- Arrondissement: Beauvais
- Canton: Grandvilliers
- Intercommunality: Picardie Verte

Government
  - Mayor (2020–2026): Michel Puissant
- Area^{1}: 5.86 km^{2} (2.26 sq mi)
- Elevation: 183 m (600 ft)
- Highest elevation: 193 m (633 ft)
- Lowest elevation: 164 m (538 ft)
- Population (2023): 272
  - Density: 46.4/km^{2} (120/sq mi)
- Time zone: UTC+01:00 (CET)
  - Summer (DST): UTC+02:00 (CEST)
- INSEE/Postal code: 60289 /60210
- ^{1} French Land Register data, which excludes lakes, ponds, glaciers > 1 km^{2} (0.386 sq mi or 247 acres) and river estuaries.

Grez is a commune in the Oise department in northern France.

== See also ==
- Communes of the Oise department
