= Saint-Maur, Oise =

Saint-Maur
- Commune
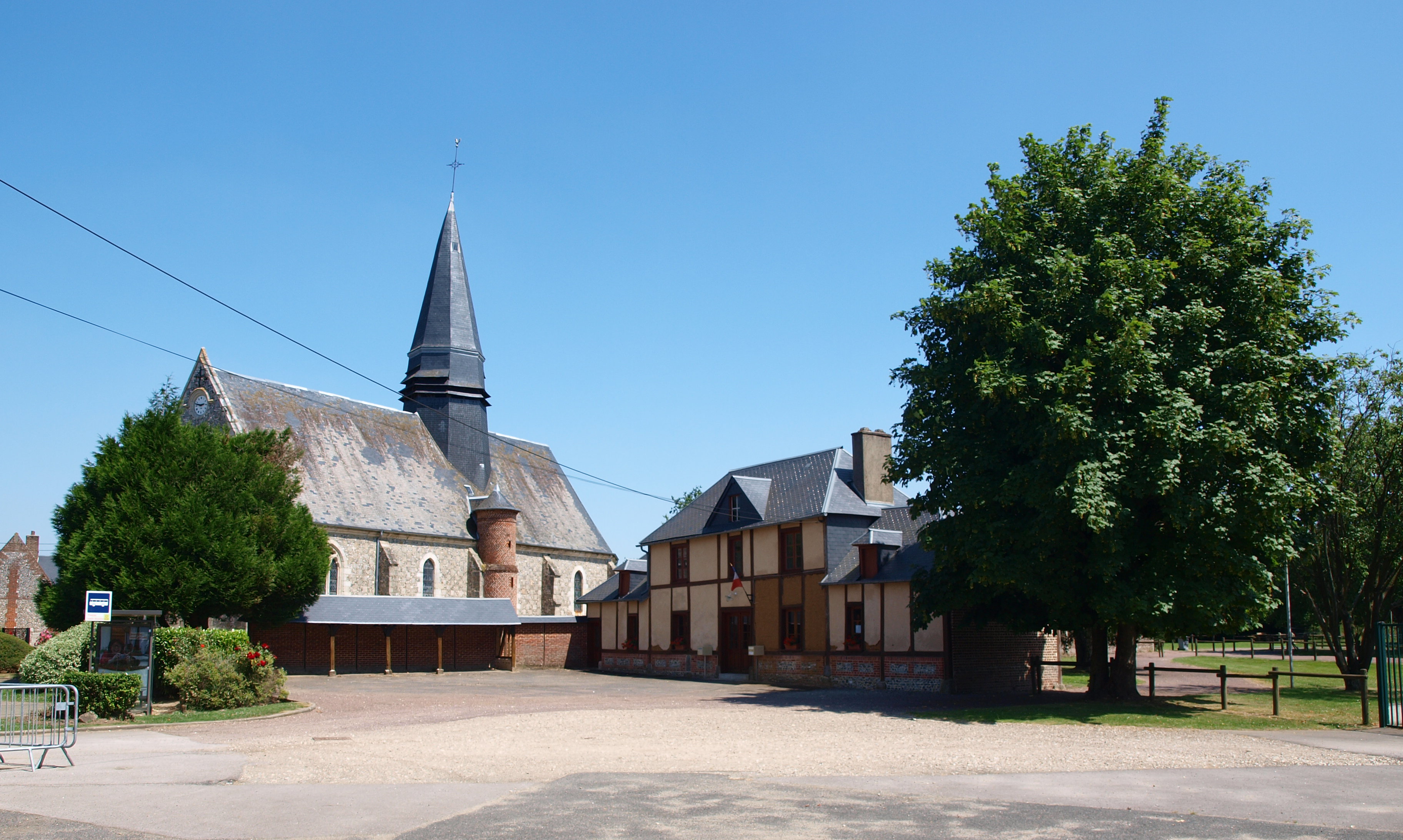
- The church in Saint-Maur

- Coat of arms
- Location of Saint-Maur
- Location within France Location within Hauts-de-France
- Coordinates: 49°37′00″N 1°55′07″E
- Country: France
- Region: Hauts-de-France
- Department: Oise
- Arrondissement: Beauvais
- Canton: Grandvilliers
- Intercommunality: Picardie Verte

Government
  - Mayor (2020–2026): Daniel Brument
- Area^{1}: 7.76 km^{2} (3.00 sq mi)
- Elevation: 190 m (620 ft)
- Highest elevation: 198 m (650 ft)
- Lowest elevation: 134 m (440 ft)
- Population (2023): 397
  - Density: 51.2/km^{2} (133/sq mi)
- Time zone: UTC+01:00 (CET)
  - Summer (DST): UTC+02:00 (CEST)
- INSEE/Postal code: 60588 /60210
- ^{1} French Land Register data, which excludes lakes, ponds, glaciers > 1 km^{2} (0.386 sq mi or 247 acres) and river estuaries.

Saint-Maur (French pronunciation: [sɛ̃ mɔʁ]) is a commune in the Oise department in northern France.

== See also ==
- Communes of the Oise department
