= Luchy =

- Commune
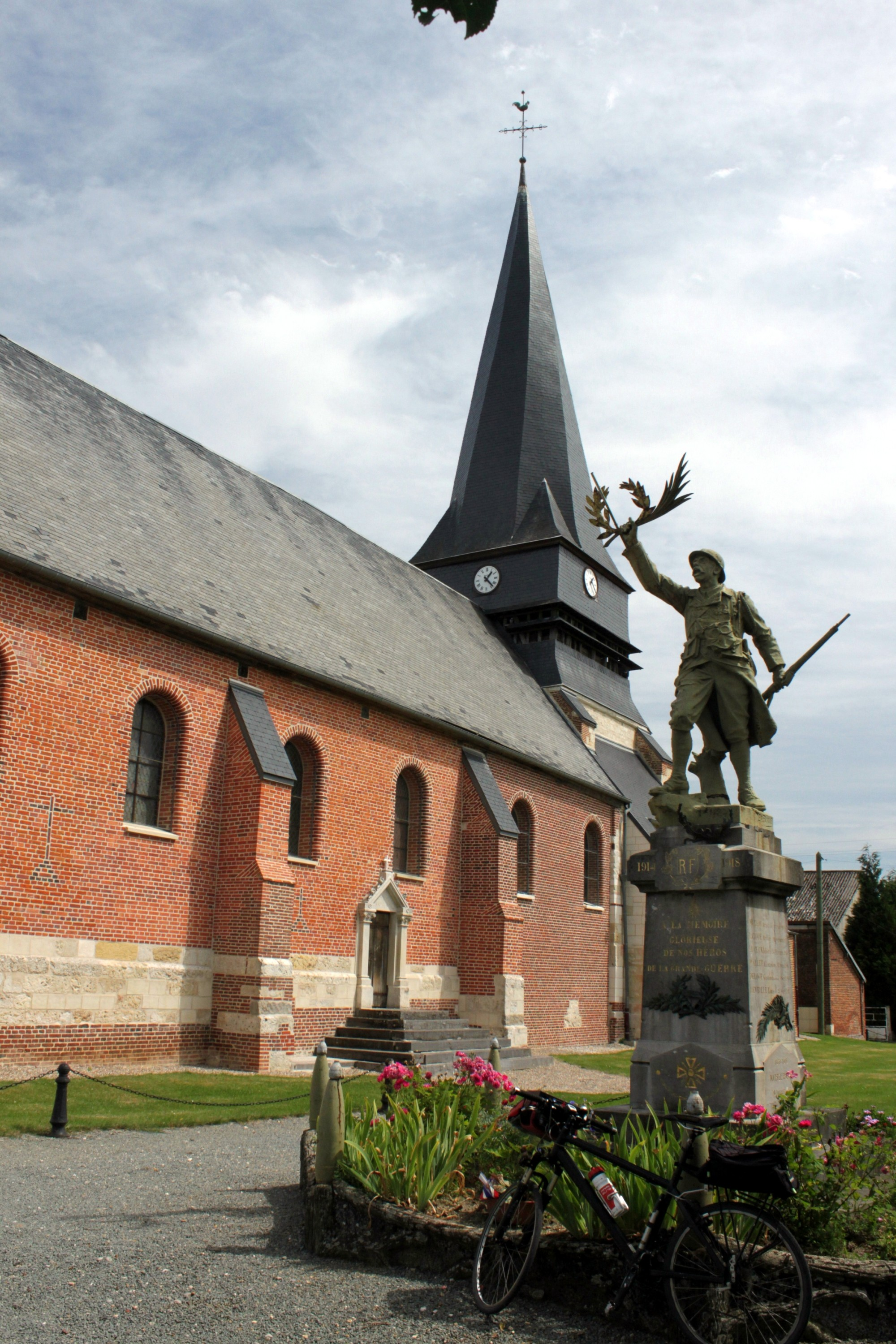
- The church and war memorial in Luchy
- Location of Luchy
- Location within France Location within Hauts-de-France
- Coordinates: 49°33′20″N 2°07′11″E
- Country: France
- Region: Hauts-de-France
- Department: Oise
- Arrondissement: Beauvais
- Canton: Saint-Just-en-Chaussée
- Intercommunality: CA Beauvaisis

Government
  - Mayor (2020–2026): Samuel Payen
- Area^{1}: 10.79 km^{2} (4.17 sq mi)
- Elevation: 180 m (590 ft)
- Highest elevation: 174 m (571 ft)
- Lowest elevation: 134 m (440 ft)
- Population (2023): 682
  - Density: 63.2/km^{2} (164/sq mi)
- Time zone: UTC+01:00 (CET)
  - Summer (DST): UTC+02:00 (CEST)
- INSEE/Postal code: 60372 /60360
- ^{1} French Land Register data, which excludes lakes, ponds, glaciers > 1 km^{2} (0.386 sq mi or 247 acres) and river estuaries.

Luchy (French pronunciation: [lyʃi]) is a commune in the Oise department in northern France.

== See also ==
- Communes of the Oise department
