= Lalandelle =

- Commune
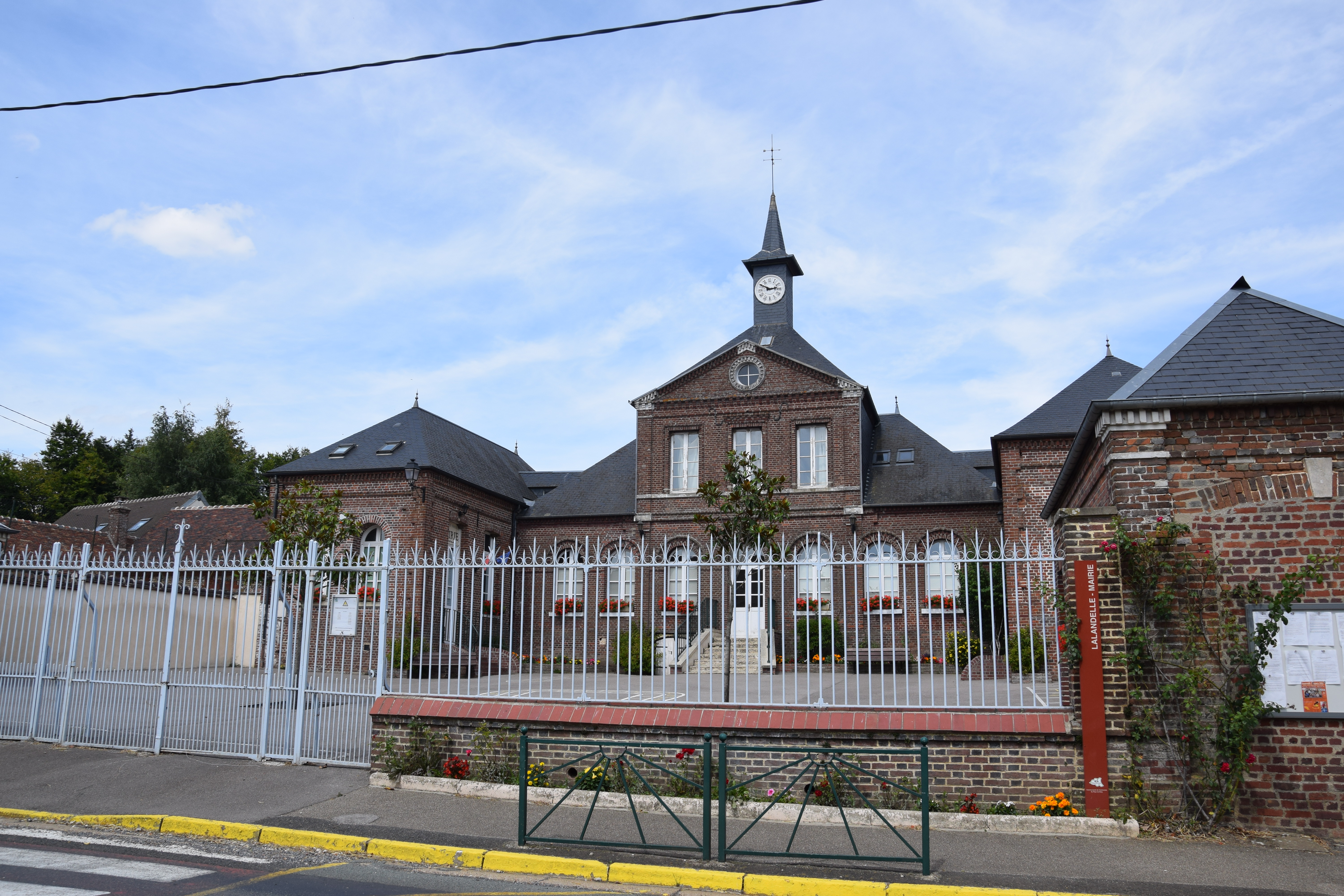
- The town hall in Lalandelle
- Location of Lalandelle
- Location within France Location within Hauts-de-France
- Coordinates: 49°23′55″N 1°52′37″E
- Country: France
- Region: Hauts-de-France
- Department: Oise
- Arrondissement: Beauvais
- Canton: Beauvais-2
- Intercommunality: Pays de Bray

Government
  - Mayor (2020–2026): Jacques Ligneul
- Area^{1}: 11.23 km^{2} (4.34 sq mi)
- Elevation: 235 m (771 ft)
- Highest elevation: 234 m (768 ft)
- Lowest elevation: 143 m (469 ft)
- Population (2023): 504
  - Density: 44.9/km^{2} (116/sq mi)
- Time zone: UTC+01:00 (CET)
  - Summer (DST): UTC+02:00 (CEST)
- INSEE/Postal code: 60344 /60850
- ^{1} French Land Register data, which excludes lakes, ponds, glaciers > 1 km^{2} (0.386 sq mi or 247 acres) and river estuaries.

Lalandelle (French pronunciation: [lalɑ̃dɛl]) is a Communes of France in the Oise department in northern France.

== See also ==
- Communes of the Oise department
