= Saint-Paul, Oise =

Saint-Paul
- Commune
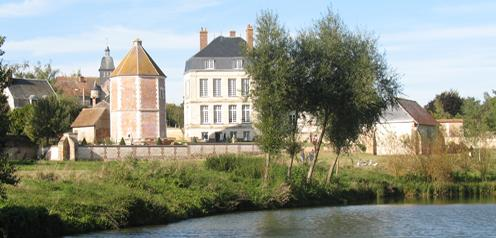
- The abbey and church in Saint-Paul

- Coat of arms
- Location of Saint-Paul
- Location within France Location within Hauts-de-France
- Coordinates: 49°25′48″N 2°00′28″E
- Country: France
- Region: Hauts-de-France
- Department: Oise
- Arrondissement: Beauvais
- Canton: Beauvais-2
- Intercommunality: CA Beauvaisis

Government
  - Mayor (2020–2026): Gérard Hédin
- Area^{1}: 9.52 km^{2} (3.68 sq mi)
- Elevation: 75 m (246 ft)
- Highest elevation: 147 m (482 ft)
- Lowest elevation: 72 m (236 ft)
- Population (2023): 1,633
  - Density: 172/km^{2} (444/sq mi)
- Time zone: UTC+01:00 (CET)
  - Summer (DST): UTC+02:00 (CEST)
- INSEE/Postal code: 60591 /60650
- ^{1} French Land Register data, which excludes lakes, ponds, glaciers > 1 km^{2} (0.386 sq mi or 247 acres) and river estuaries.

Saint-Paul is a commune in the Oise department in northern France.

== See also ==
- Communes of the Oise department
