= Lalande-en-Son =

- Commune
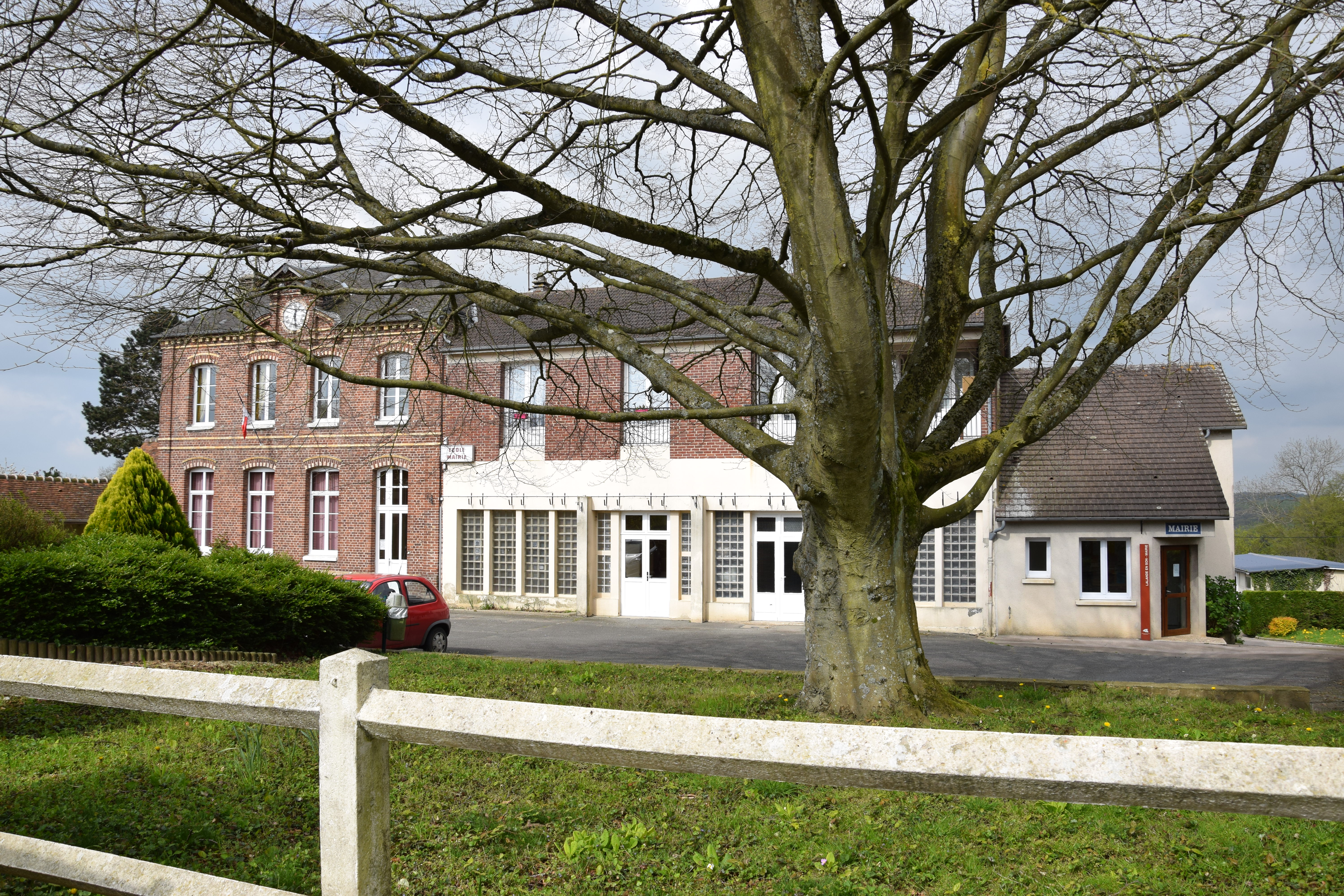
- The town hall and school in Lalande-en-Son
- Location of Lalande-en-Son
- Location within France Location within Hauts-de-France
- Coordinates: 49°23′31″N 1°46′57″E
- Country: France
- Region: Hauts-de-France
- Department: Oise
- Arrondissement: Beauvais
- Canton: Beauvais-2
- Intercommunality: Pays de Bray

Government
  - Mayor (2020–2026): Christophe Duquenoy
- Area^{1}: 5.99 km^{2} (2.31 sq mi)
- Elevation: 187 m (614 ft)
- Highest elevation: 210 m (690 ft)
- Lowest elevation: 83 m (272 ft)
- Population (2023): 606
  - Density: 101/km^{2} (262/sq mi)
- Time zone: UTC+01:00 (CET)
  - Summer (DST): UTC+02:00 (CEST)
- INSEE/Postal code: 60343 /60590
- ^{1} French Land Register data, which excludes lakes, ponds, glaciers > 1 km^{2} (0.386 sq mi or 247 acres) and river estuaries.

Lalande-en-Son is a commune in the Oise department in northern France.

== See also ==
- Communes of the Oise department
