= Rotangy =

- Commune
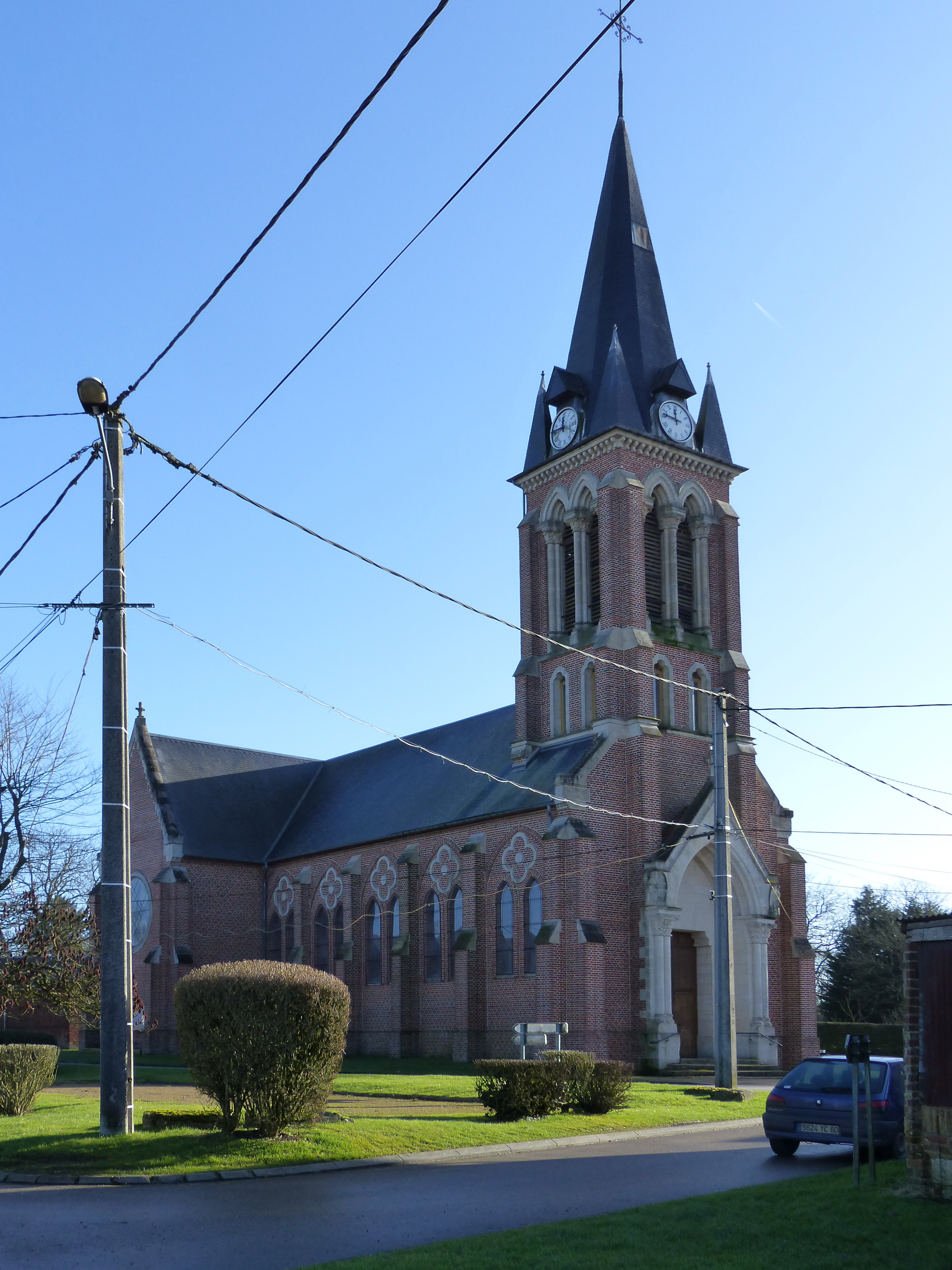
- The church in Rotangy
- Location of Rotangy
- Location within France Location within Hauts-de-France
- Coordinates: 49°35′00″N 2°05′01″E
- Country: France
- Region: Hauts-de-France
- Department: Oise
- Arrondissement: Beauvais
- Canton: Saint-Just-en-Chaussée
- Intercommunality: CA Beauvaisis

Government
  - Mayor (2020–2026): Régis Langlet
- Area^{1}: 9.78 km^{2} (3.78 sq mi)
- Elevation: 169 m (554 ft)
- Highest elevation: 179 m (587 ft)
- Lowest elevation: 134 m (440 ft)
- Population (2023): 235
  - Density: 24.0/km^{2} (62.2/sq mi)
- Time zone: UTC+01:00 (CET)
  - Summer (DST): UTC+02:00 (CEST)
- INSEE/Postal code: 60549 /60360
- ^{1} French Land Register data, which excludes lakes, ponds, glaciers > 1 km^{2} (0.386 sq mi or 247 acres) and river estuaries.

Rotangy (French pronunciation: [ʁɔtɑ̃ʒi]) is a commune in the Oise department in northern France.

== See also ==
- Communes of the Oise department
