= Ons-en-Bray =

- Commune
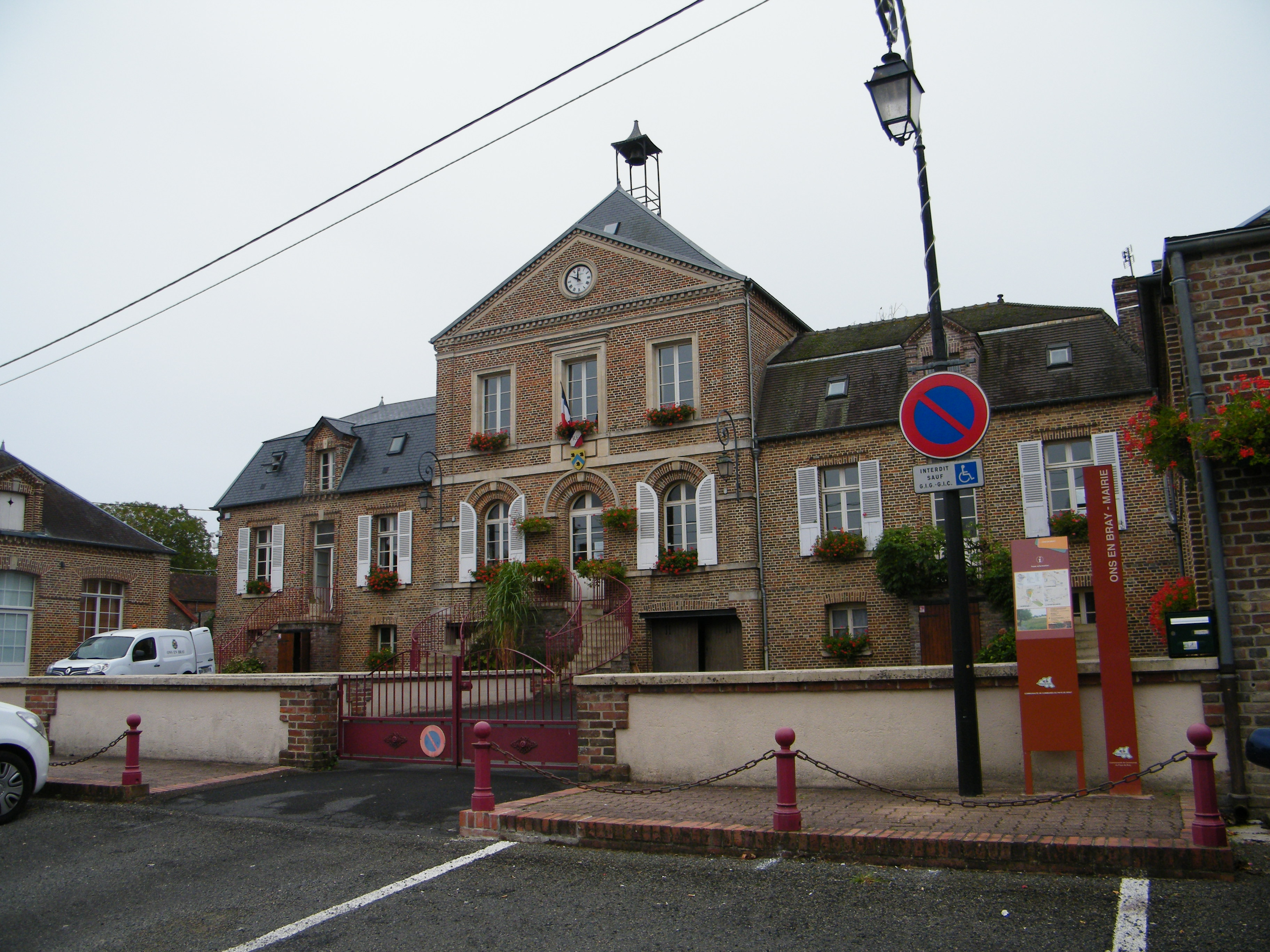
- The town hall in Ons-en-Bray

- Coat of arms
- Location of Ons-en-Bray
- Location within France Location within Hauts-de-France
- Coordinates: 49°24′53″N 1°55′13″E
- Country: France
- Region: Hauts-de-France
- Department: Oise
- Arrondissement: Beauvais
- Canton: Beauvais-2
- Intercommunality: Pays de Bray

Government
  - Mayor (2020–2026): France Vermeulen
- Area^{1}: 13.95 km^{2} (5.39 sq mi)
- Elevation: 160 m (520 ft)
- Highest elevation: 233 m (764 ft)
- Lowest elevation: 77 m (253 ft)
- Population (2023): 1,367
  - Density: 97.99/km^{2} (253.8/sq mi)
- Time zone: UTC+01:00 (CET)
  - Summer (DST): UTC+02:00 (CEST)
- INSEE/Postal code: 60477 /60650
- ^{1} French Land Register data, which excludes lakes, ponds, glaciers > 1 km^{2} (0.386 sq mi or 247 acres) and river estuaries.

Ons-en-Bray is a commune in the Oise department in northern France.

== See also ==
- Communes of the Oise department
