= La Houssoye =

- Commune
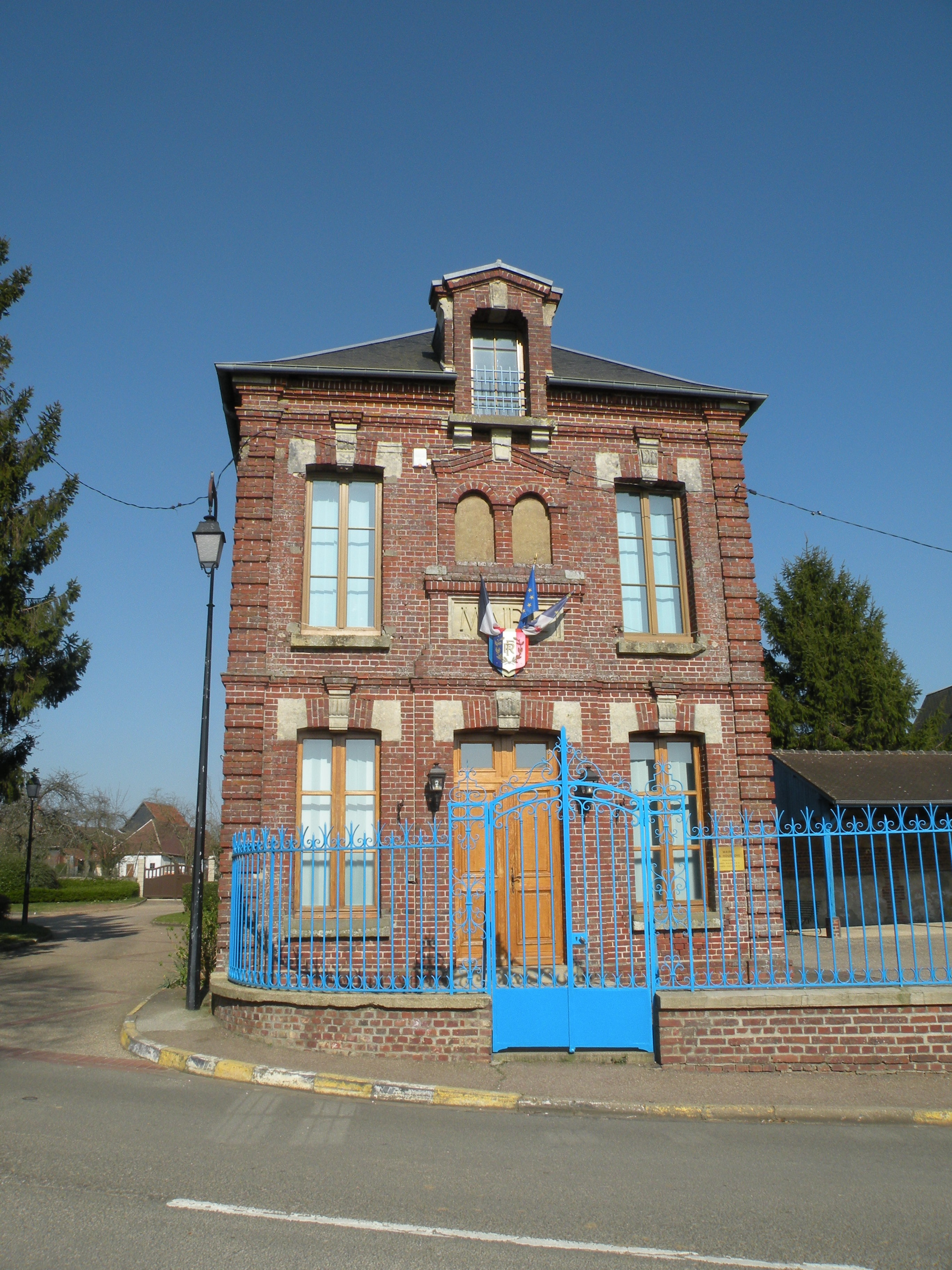
- The town hall in La Houssoye
- Location of La Houssoye
- Location within France Location within Hauts-de-France
- Coordinates: 49°21′19″N 1°56′34″E
- Country: France
- Region: Hauts-de-France
- Department: Oise
- Arrondissement: Beauvais
- Canton: Beauvais-2

Government
  - Mayor (2022–2026): Benjamin Peny
- Area^{1}: 6.5 km^{2} (2.5 sq mi)
- Elevation: 220 m (720 ft)
- Highest elevation: 235 m (771 ft)
- Lowest elevation: 155 m (509 ft)
- Population (2023): 591
  - Density: 91/km^{2} (240/sq mi)
- Time zone: UTC+01:00 (CET)
  - Summer (DST): UTC+02:00 (CEST)
- INSEE/Postal code: 60319 /60390
- ^{1} French Land Register data, which excludes lakes, ponds, glaciers > 1 km^{2} (0.386 sq mi or 247 acres) and river estuaries.

La Houssoye (French pronunciation: [la uswa]) is a commune in the Oise department in northern France.

== See also ==
- Communes of the Oise department
