= Aux Marais =

- Commune
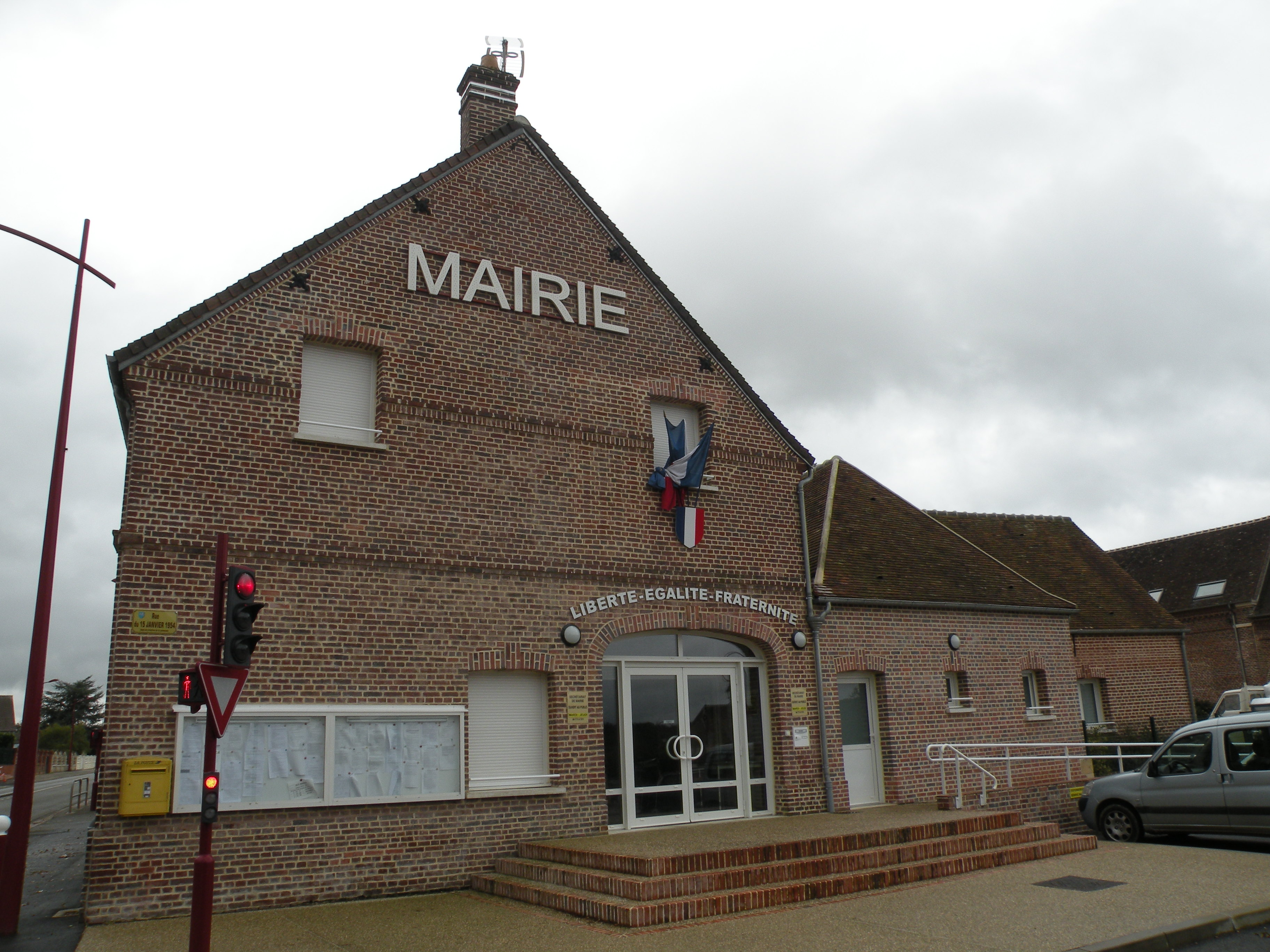
- The town hall in Aux Marais
- Location of Aux Marais
- Location within France Location within Hauts-de-France
- Coordinates: 49°24′53″N 2°02′34″E
- Country: France
- Region: Hauts-de-France
- Department: Oise
- Arrondissement: Beauvais
- Canton: Beauvais-2
- Intercommunality: CA Beauvaisis

Government
  - Mayor (2020–2026): Christophe Tabary
- Area^{1}: 5.71 km^{2} (2.20 sq mi)
- Highest elevation: 172 m (564 ft)
- Lowest elevation: 67 m (220 ft)
- Population (2023): 921
  - Density: 161/km^{2} (418/sq mi)
- Time zone: UTC+01:00 (CET)
  - Summer (DST): UTC+02:00 (CEST)
- INSEE/Postal code: 60703 /60000
- ^{1} French Land Register data, which excludes lakes, ponds, glaciers > 1 km^{2} (0.386 sq mi or 247 acres) and river estuaries.

Aux Marais (French pronunciation: [o maʁɛ]) is a commune in the Oise department in northern France.

== Population ==
Historical population
Year	Pop.	±% p.a.
1968	501	—
1975	550	+1.34%
1982	698	+3.46%
1990	693	−0.09%
1999	682	−0.18%
2007	731	+0.87%
2012	738	+0.19%
2017	847	+2.79%
2023	921	+1.41%
Source: INSEE

== See also ==
- Communes of the Oise department
