= Le Vauroux =

- Commune
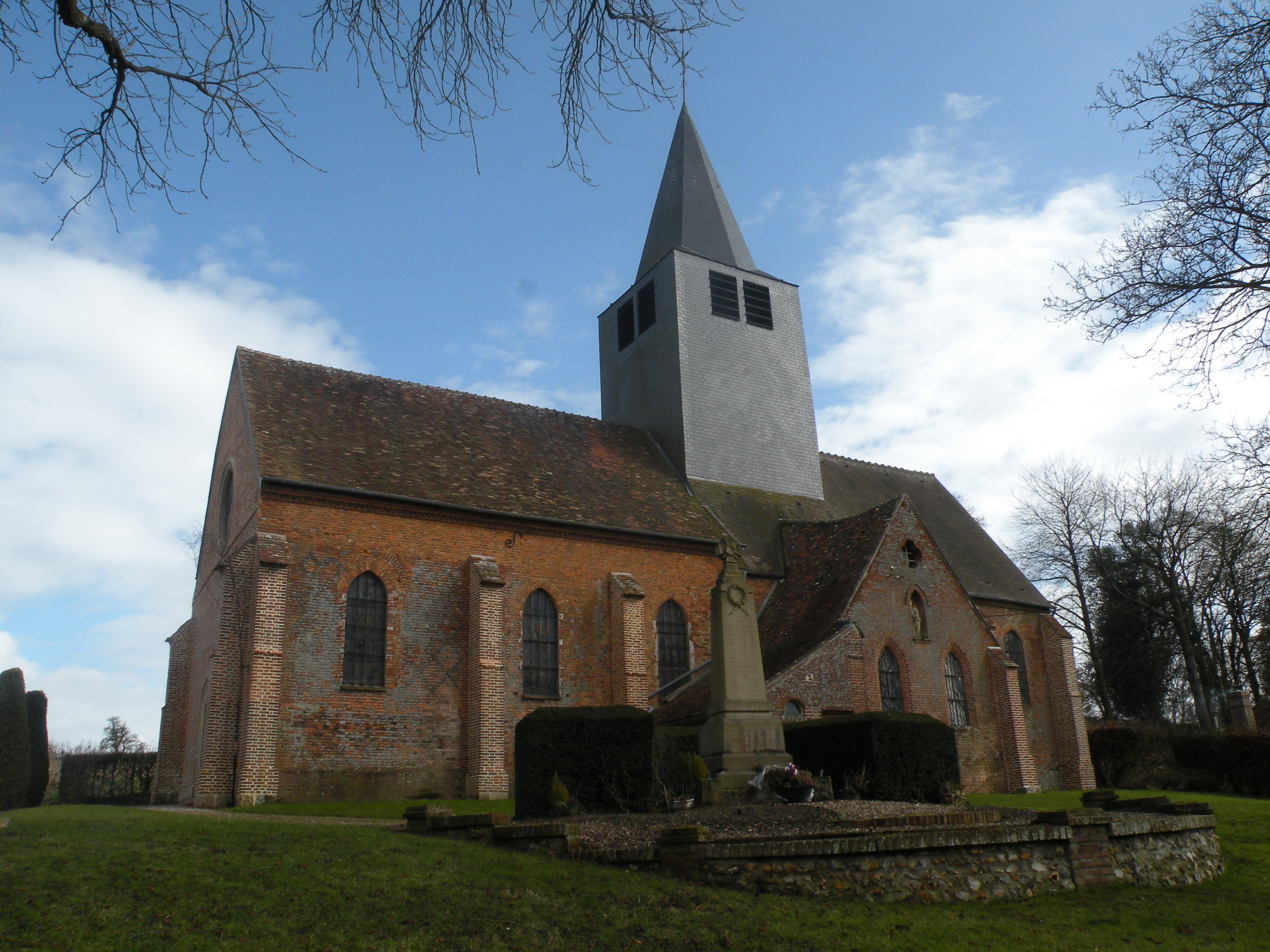
- The church in Le Vauroux
- Location of Le Vauroux
- Location within France Location within Hauts-de-France
- Coordinates: 49°22′48″N 1°55′29″E
- Country: France
- Region: Hauts-de-France
- Department: Oise
- Arrondissement: Beauvais
- Canton: Beauvais-2
- Intercommunality: Pays de Bray

Government
  - Mayor (2020–2026): Bruno Leroux
- Area^{1}: 9.74 km^{2} (3.76 sq mi)
- Elevation: 235 m (771 ft)
- Highest elevation: 236 m (774 ft)
- Lowest elevation: 149 m (489 ft)
- Population (2023): 495
  - Density: 50.8/km^{2} (132/sq mi)
- Time zone: UTC+01:00 (CET)
  - Summer (DST): UTC+02:00 (CEST)
- INSEE/Postal code: 60662 /60390
- ^{1} French Land Register data, which excludes lakes, ponds, glaciers > 1 km^{2} (0.386 sq mi or 247 acres) and river estuaries.

Le Vauroux (French pronunciation: [lə voʁu]) is a commune in the Oise department in northern France.

== See also ==
- Communes of the Oise department
