= Labosse =

- Commune
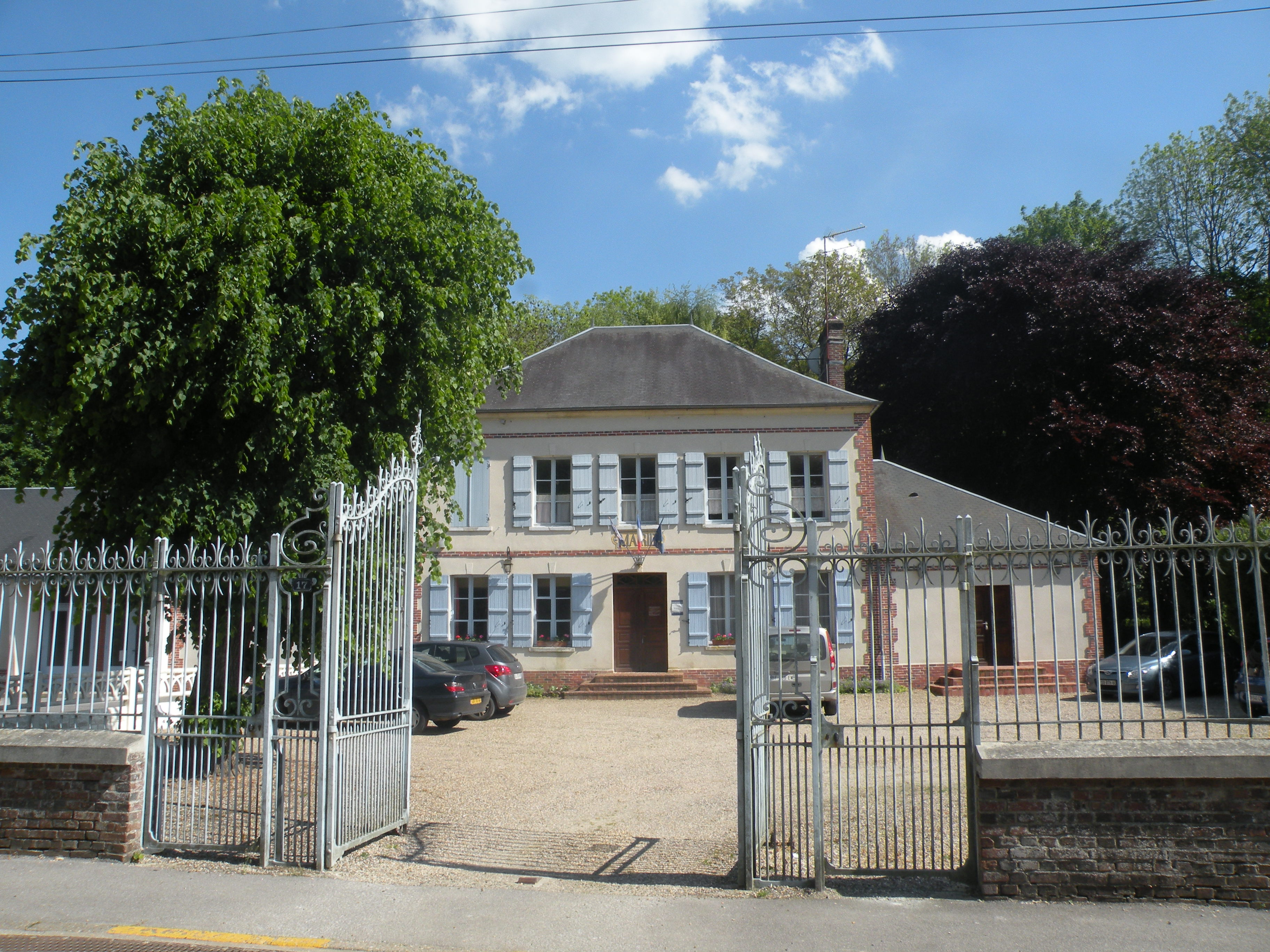
- The town hall in Labosse

- Coat of arms
- Location of Labosse
- Location within France Location within Hauts-de-France
- Coordinates: 49°20′46″N 1°53′56″E
- Country: France
- Region: Hauts-de-France
- Department: Oise
- Arrondissement: Beauvais
- Canton: Beauvais-2
- Intercommunality: Pays de Bray

Government
  - Mayor (2020–2026): Jean-Claude Duthion
- Area^{1}: 14.22 km^{2} (5.49 sq mi)
- Elevation: 188 m (617 ft)
- Highest elevation: 216 m (709 ft)
- Lowest elevation: 109 m (358 ft)
- Population (2023): 456
  - Density: 32.1/km^{2} (83.1/sq mi)
- Time zone: UTC+01:00 (CET)
  - Summer (DST): UTC+02:00 (CEST)
- INSEE/Postal code: 60331 /60590
- ^{1} French Land Register data, which excludes lakes, ponds, glaciers > 1 km^{2} (0.386 sq mi or 247 acres) and river estuaries.

Labosse (French pronunciation: [labɔs]) is a commune in the Oise department in northern France. The commune of Labosse is part of the canton of Beauvais-2 and of the arrondissement of Beauvais. As of 2019, there are 237 dwellings in the commune, of which 168 principal residences.

== See also ==
- Communes of the Oise department
