= Grandvilliers station =

French railway station

Grandvilliers
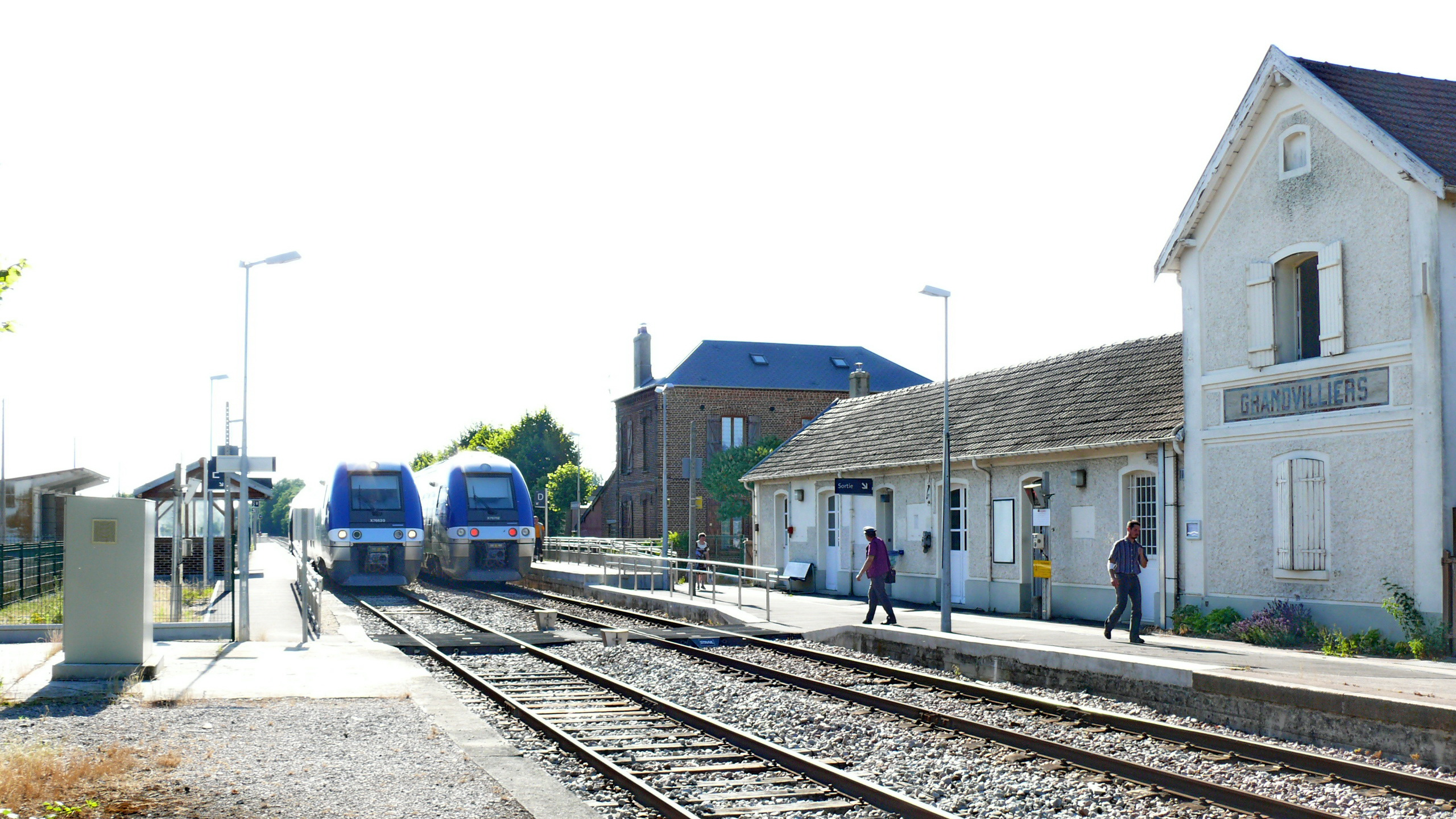
- Grandvilliers station

General information
- Location: Avenue Saget near Grandvilliers, France
- Coordinates: 49°39′32″N 1°56′17″E
- Owner: RFF/SNCF
- Line: Épinay-Villetaneuse–Le Tréport-Mers railway
- Platforms: 2 platforms 2 walkways

Other information
- Station code: 87313734

History
- Opened: 1875

Services
Preceding station	TER Hauts-de-France	Following station
Marseille-en-Beauvaisis towards Beauvais	Proxi P30	Feuquières–Broquiers towards Le Tréport-Mers
Location

Grandvilliers is a railway station in Grandvilliers in the Oise department, France. It is served by TER Hauts-de-France trains from Beauvais to Le Tréport-Mers. As of 2022 the station is served by 9 trains in each direction on weekdays and 3 on Sundays.

Goods sidings remain in place, used in particular by a grain merchant, and his facilities make it possible to switch trains from one track to another. The station was renovated in 2009 as part of a programme of modernisation of the stations between Beauvais and Abancourt, which notably included making the station accessible to the handicapped.

== Historical highlights ==
The station is located on avenue du Général Saget, which has been so named since 21 May 1875, in honour of the services of General Henri Saget to Grandvilliers. Born 5 November 1813 at La Flèche, Saget participated in drawing the official map of France, then left the army in 1886 with the rank of Brigadier General and entered politics, winning election to the Council of the canton of Grandvilliers and later serving as president of the Council of Oise from 1886 to 1890. He was instrumental in having the railway line between Paris, Beauvais, and Le Tréport-Mers pass through Grandvilliers, which was the reason for naming after him the street which leads to the station.

During the Second World War, the station served as the base of deployment for V1 rockets brought by rail from the Saint-Maximin quarries to be launched at England from nearby locations. The train loaded with these rockets stopped in the Marseille-en-Beauvaisis tunnel.

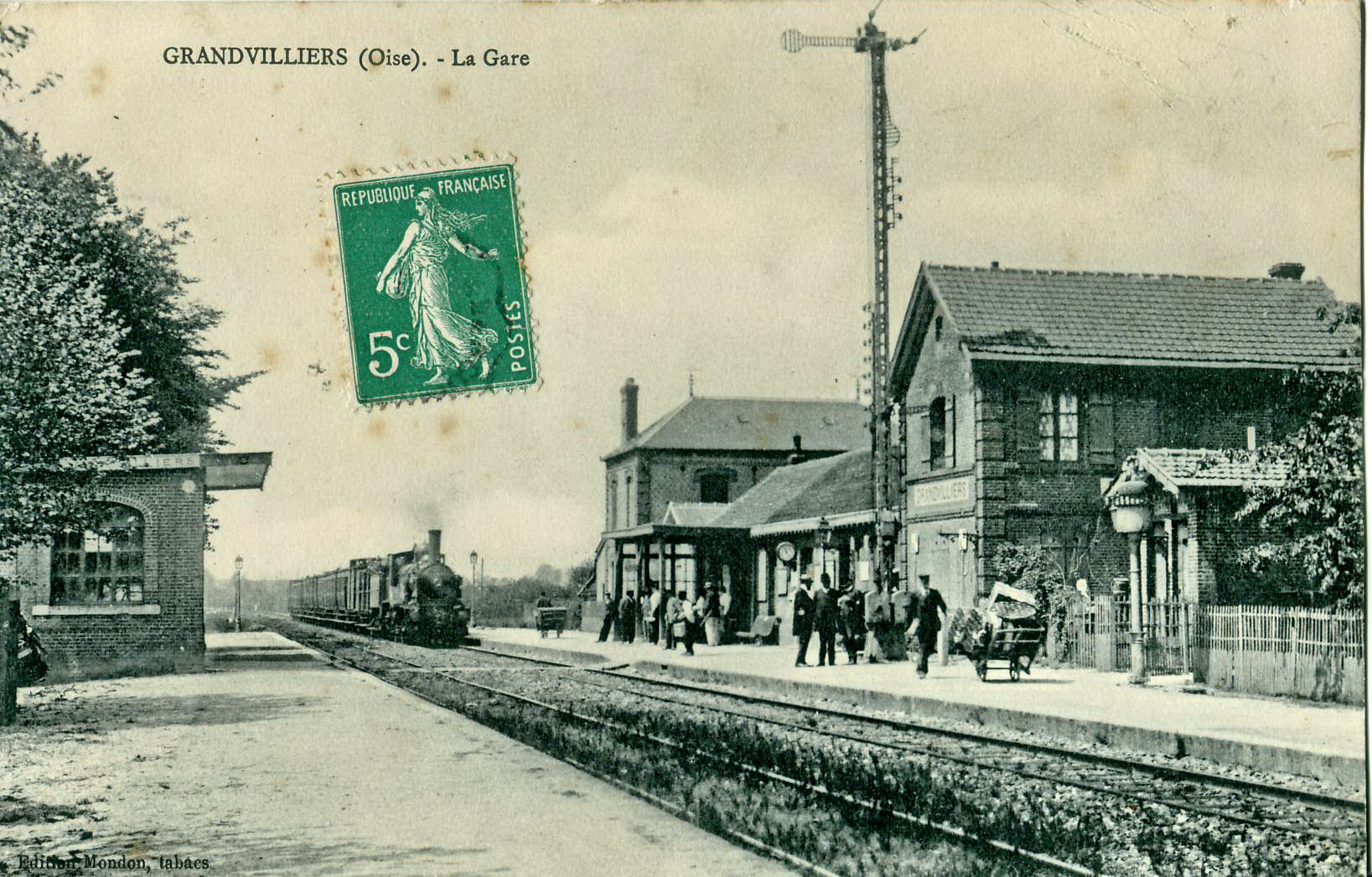
Early 20th-century view of the station, facing west (towards Amiens)

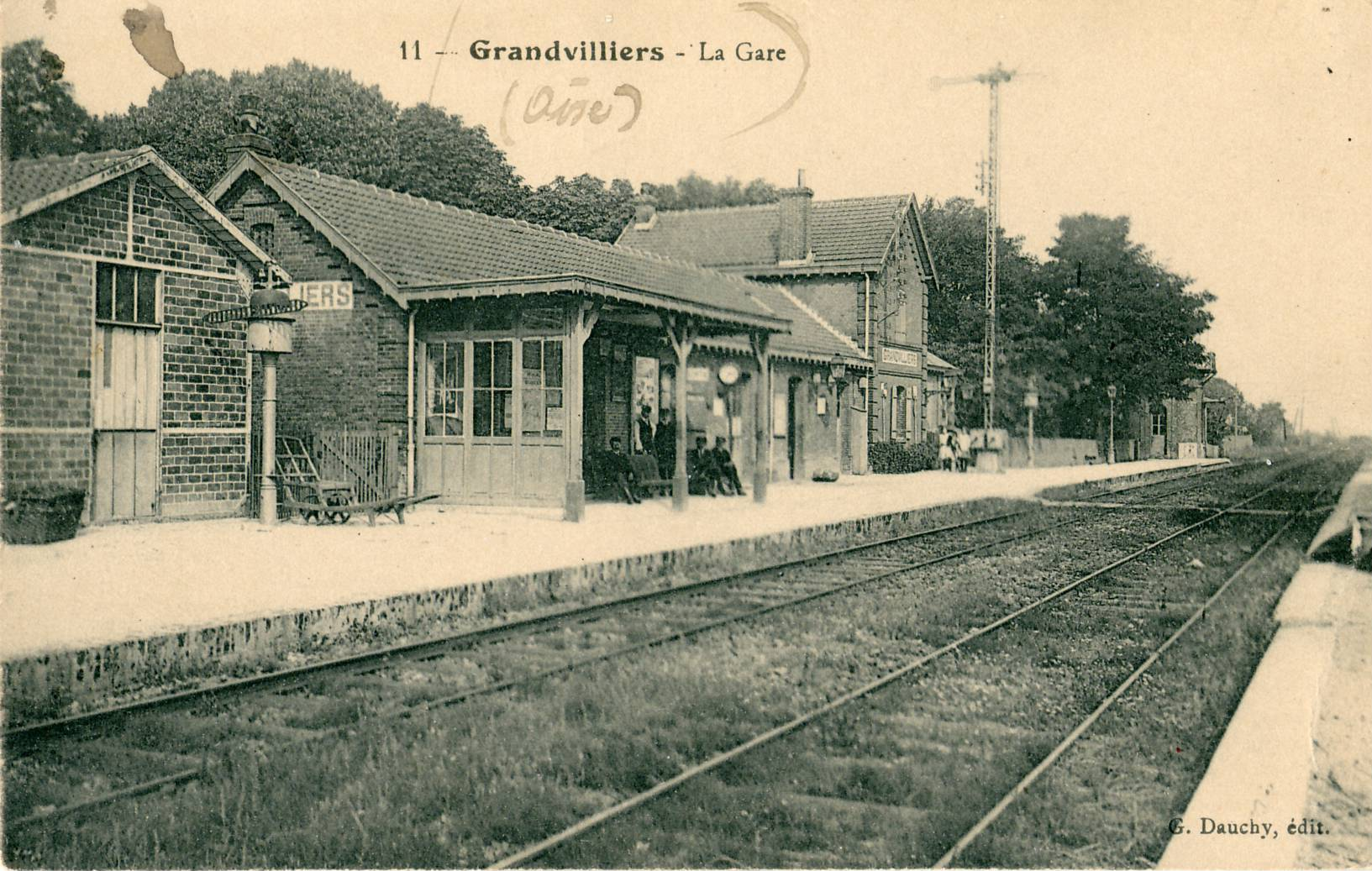
Early 20th-century view of the station, facing east (towards Beauvais and Paris)

== See also ==
- List of SNCF stations in Hauts-de-France
