= Milly-sur-Thérain station =

French railway station

Milly-sur-Thérain
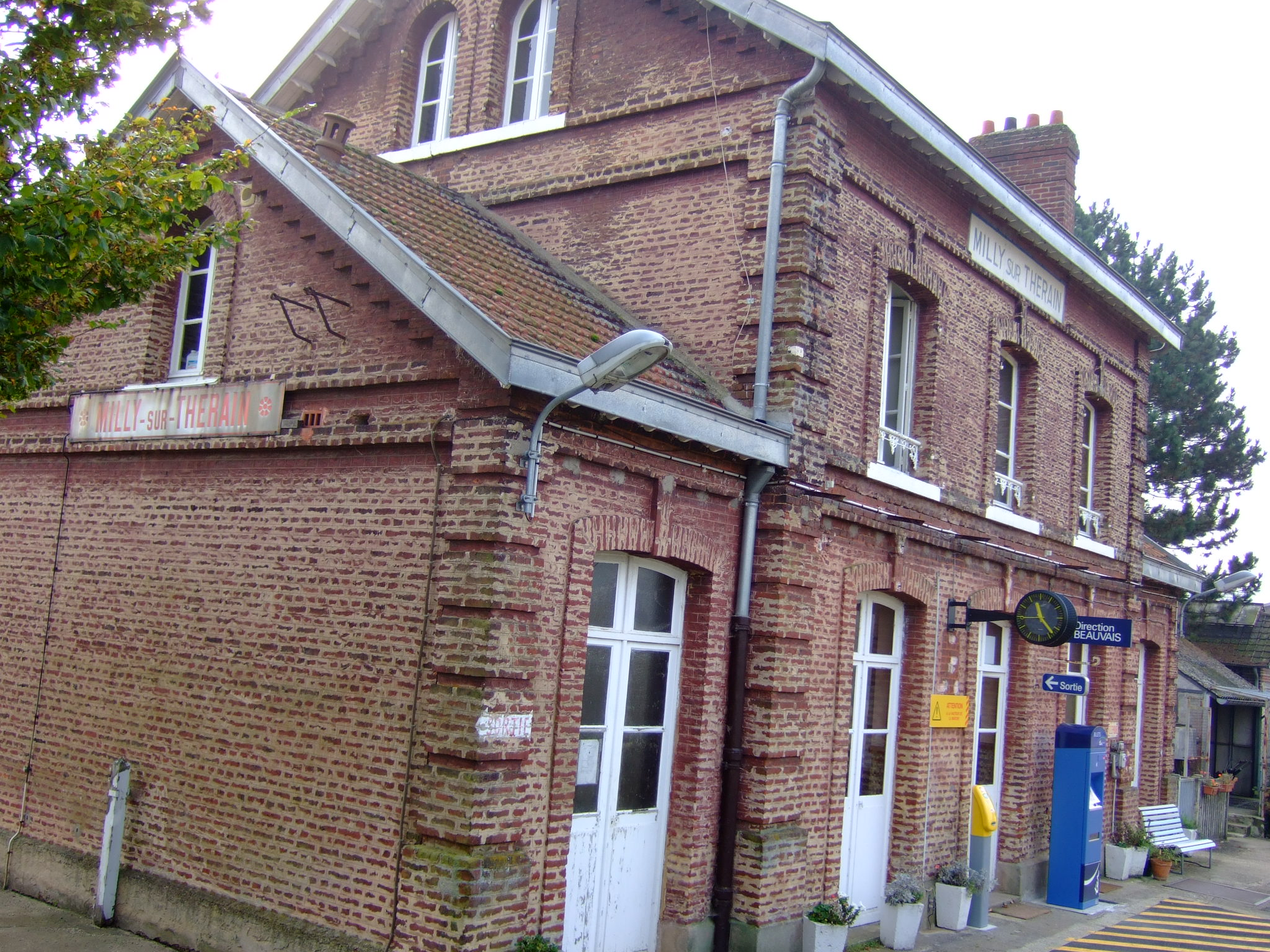
- View of the station from a Beauvais-bound TER train

General information
- Location: Rue de la Gare, Milly sur Thérain, France
- Coordinates: 49°30′13″N 1°59′18″E
- Owner: RFF/SNCF
- Line: Épinay-Villetaneuse–Le Tréport-Mers railway
- Platforms: 2
- Tracks: 2

Other information
- Station code: 87313700

History
- Opened: 1875

Services
Preceding station	TER Hauts-de-France	Following station
Herchies towards Beauvais	Proxi P30	Saint-Omer-en-Chaussée towards Le Tréport-Mers
Location

Milly-sur-Thérain is a railway station located in the commune of Milly-sur-Thérain in the Oise department, France. It is on the Épinay-Villetaneuse–Le Tréport-Mers railway line and is served by TER Hauts-de-France trains from Beauvais to Le Tréport.

== History ==
Milly-sur-Thérain was formerly the interchange station for a metre gauge local-interest line which ran through the Thérain valley to Formerie. Opened on 22 October 1894, this line was closed to all traffic on 31 December 1935.

In 2009, as part of the modernisation of the line between Beauvais and Abancourt, the station was made accessible to mobility-challenged people.

== See also ==
- List of SNCF stations in Hauts-de-France
