= Formerie station =

French railway station

Formerie
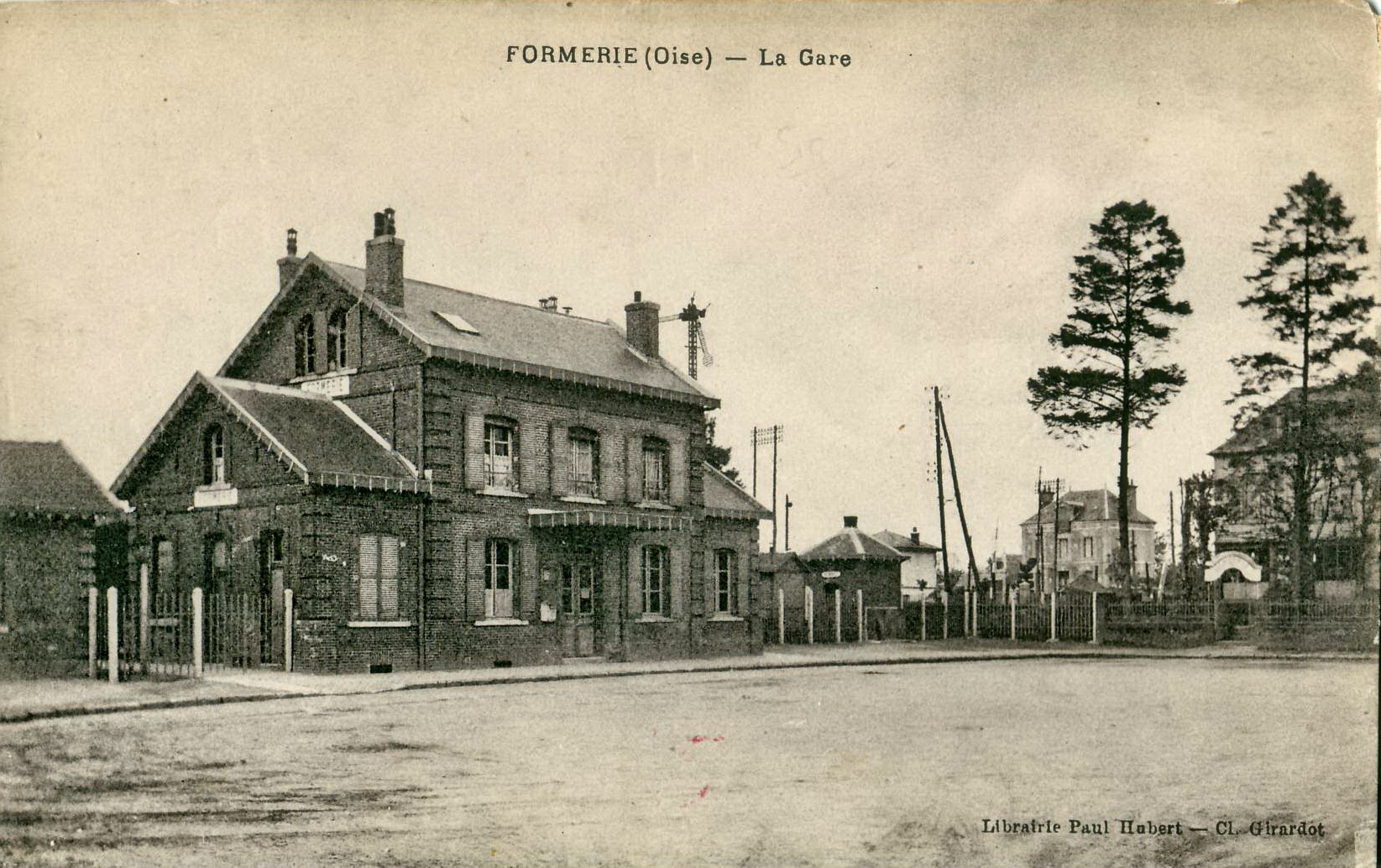
- The station in the early 20th century

General information
- Location: Rue du Maréchal Joffre; 60220 Formerie
- Coordinates: 49°39′14″N 1°43′20″E
- Owner: RFF/SNCF
- Line: Amiens–Rouen railway
- Platforms: 2
- Tracks: 2

Other information
- Station code: 87313833

Services
Preceding station	TER Hauts-de-France	Following station
Abancourt towards Amiens	Proxi P45	Serqueux towards Rouen-RD
Location

Formerie is a railway station located in the commune of Formerie in the Oise department, France. The station is served by TER Hauts-de-France and TER Normandie trains from Amiens to Rouen.

According to the SNCF, the station averaged 16 passengers per operating day in 2003.

== History ==
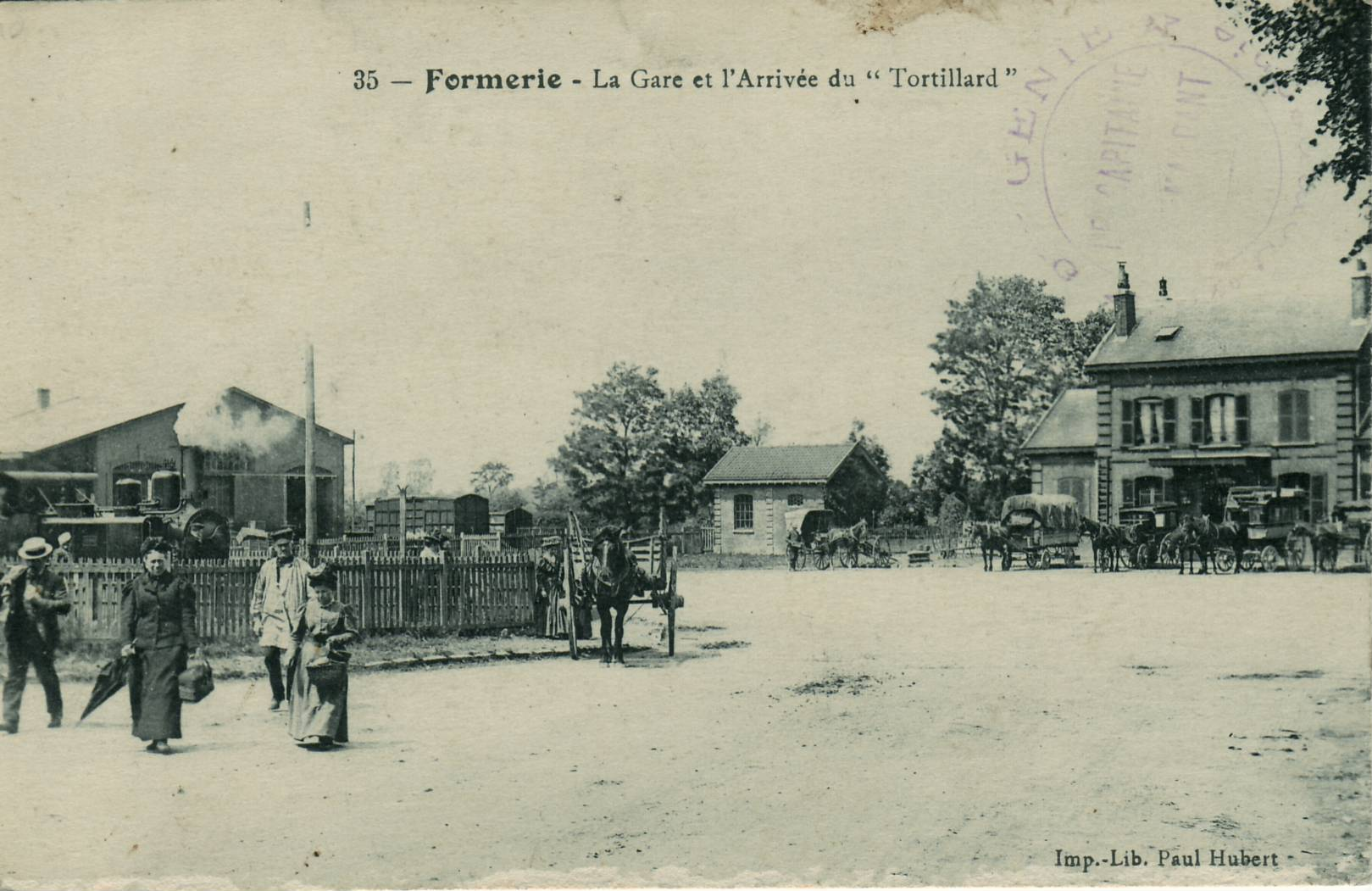
Arrival of the branch line train from Milly (left), postcard franked 1916

There was a munitions depot for the Army of the North at the station between the winter of 1915/16 and the end of the First World War.

Formerie was previously the interchange station to a metre gauge line of local interest linking Milly-sur-Thérain to Formerie via the Thérain valley. At Milly-sur-Thérain there was a connection to Beauvais on the Paris Nord - Le Tréport-Mers line. Opened on 22 October 1894, this line was closed to all traffic on 31 December 1935.

== See also ==
- List of SNCF stations in Hauts-de-France
