= Feuquières =

Feuquières may refer to:

== Persons ==
- Isaac Manasses de Pas, Marquis de Feuquieres (1590–1640), a French diplomat
- Antoine de Pas de Feuquieres (1648–1711), a French soldier
- Philibert-Charles de Pas de Feuquières, Bishop of Agde, 1702–1726

== Places ==
- Feuquières Lake, Quebec, Canada
- Feuquières, Oise, a commune in the department of Oise, France
- Feuquières-en-Vimeu, a commune in the department of Somme, France
