= Savignies =

- Commune
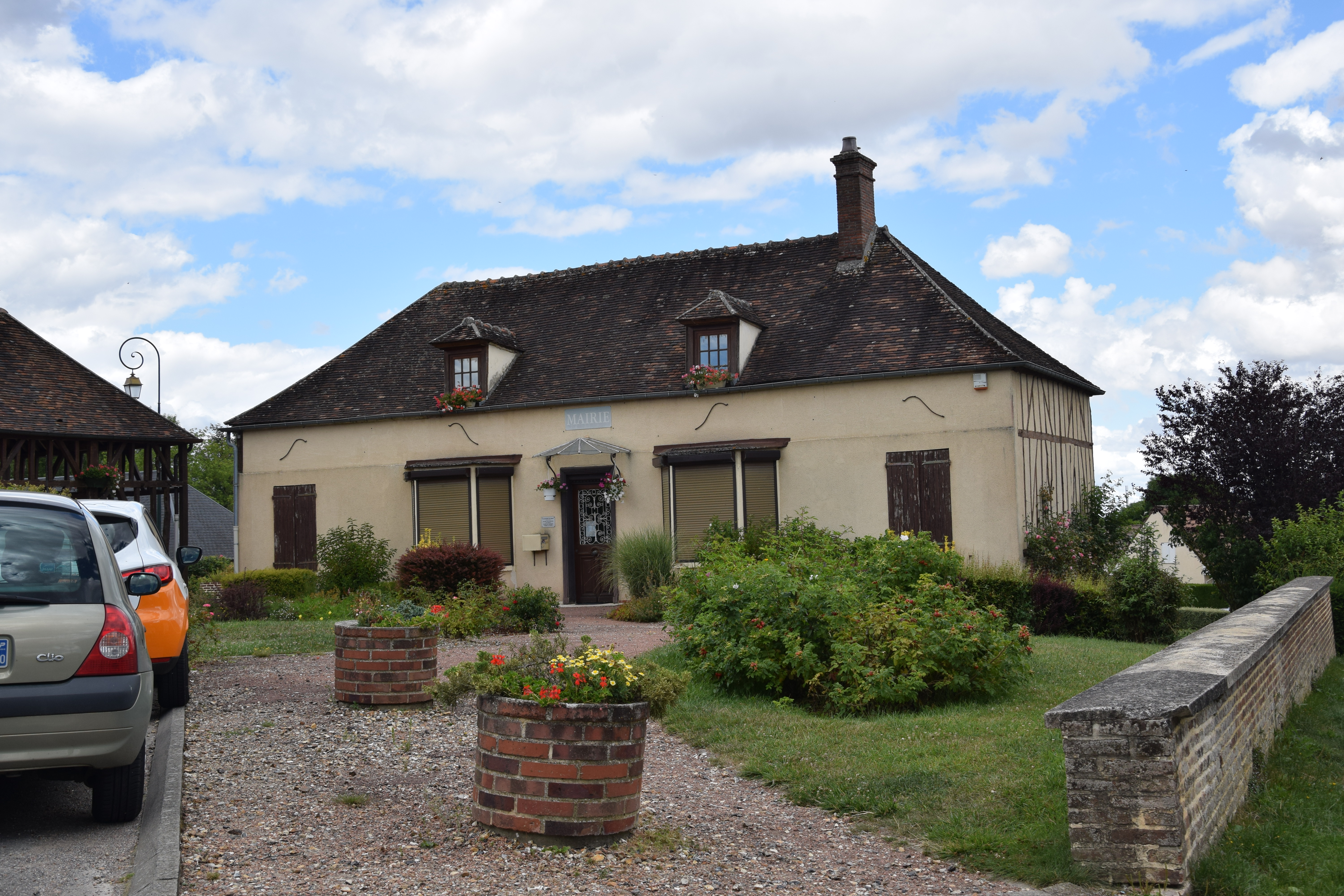
- The town hall in Savignies
- Location of Savignies
- Location within France Location within Hauts-de-France
- Coordinates: 49°27′57″N 1°57′54″E
- Country: France
- Region: Hauts-de-France
- Department: Oise
- Arrondissement: Beauvais
- Canton: Beauvais-1
- Intercommunality: CA Beauvaisis

Government
  - Mayor (2020–2026): Michel Boquet
- Area^{1}: 9.83 km^{2} (3.80 sq mi)
- Elevation: 160 m (520 ft)
- Highest elevation: 236 m (774 ft)
- Lowest elevation: 105 m (344 ft)
- Population (2023): 933
  - Density: 94.9/km^{2} (246/sq mi)
- Time zone: UTC+01:00 (CET)
  - Summer (DST): UTC+02:00 (CEST)
- INSEE/Postal code: 60609 /60650
- ^{1} French Land Register data, which excludes lakes, ponds, glaciers > 1 km^{2} (0.386 sq mi or 247 acres) and river estuaries.

Savignies (French pronunciation: [saviɲi]) is a commune in the Oise department in northern France.

== Notable people ==
- Philippe Adrien (1939-), stage director

== See also ==
- Communes of the Oise department
