= Canton of Beauvais-1 =

Canton of France

Coordinates: 49.43°N 2.09°E

- Canton
- Situation of the canton of Beauvais-1 in the department of Oise
- Country: France
- Region: Hauts-de-France
- Department: Oise
- No. of communes: {{{nbcomm}}}
- Population (2023): 39,580
- INSEE code: 6001

The canton of Beauvais-1 is an administrative division of the Oise department, northern France. It was created at the French canton reorganisation which came into effect in March 2015. Its seat is in Beauvais.

It consists of the following communes:

1. Beauvais (partly)
2. Fouquenies
3. Herchies
4. Milly-sur-Thérain
5. Le Mont-Saint-Adrien
6. Pierrefitte-en-Beauvaisis
7. Saint-Germain-la-Poterie
8. Savignies
