= Fouquenies =

- Commune
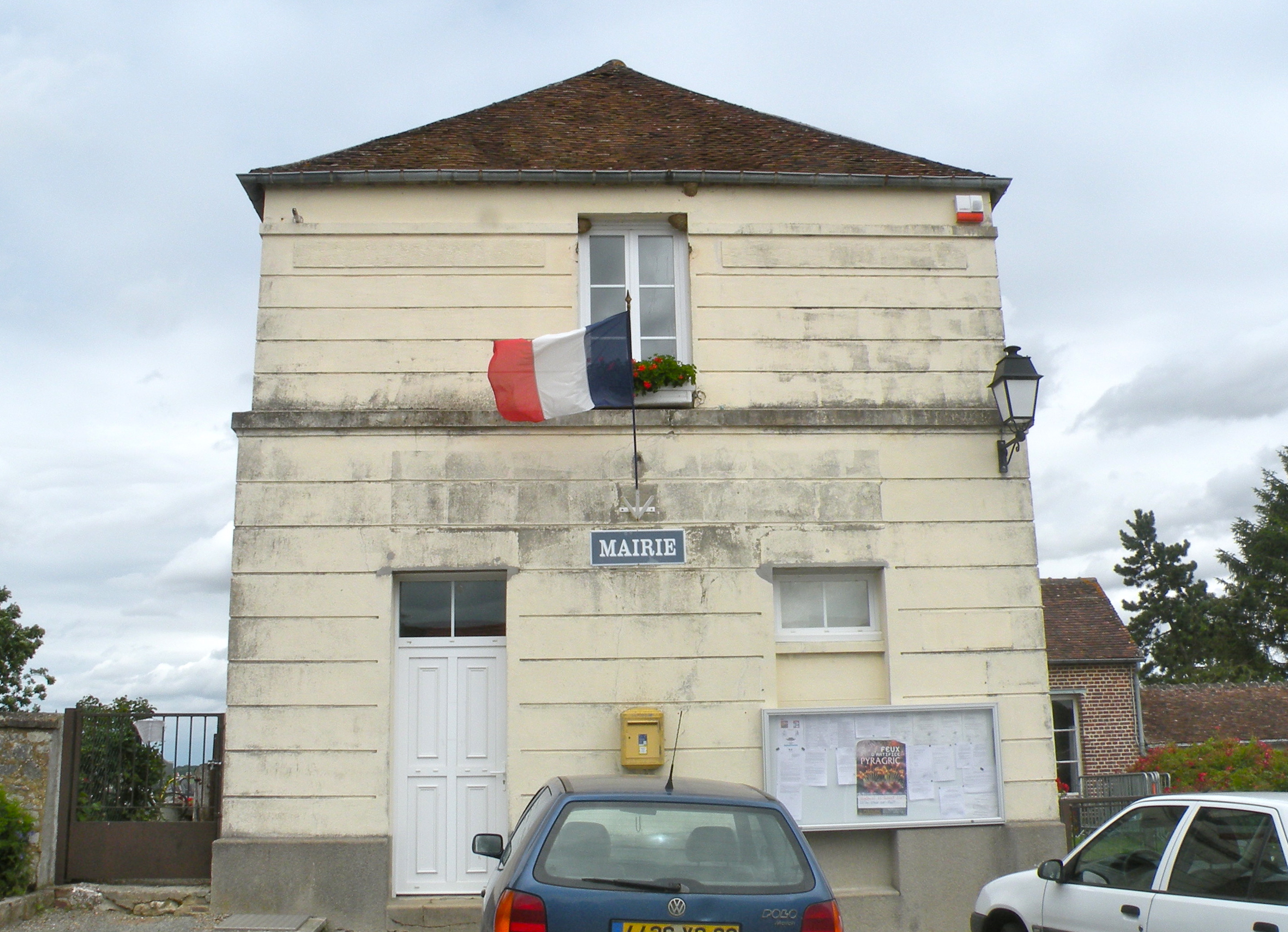
- The town hall in Fouquenies
- Location of Fouquenies
- Location within France Location within Hauts-de-France
- Coordinates: 49°28′00″N 2°02′27″E
- Country: France
- Region: Hauts-de-France
- Department: Oise
- Arrondissement: Beauvais
- Canton: Beauvais-1
- Intercommunality: CA Beauvaisis

Government
  - Mayor (2020–2026): Henry Gaudissart
- Area^{1}: 6.35 km^{2} (2.45 sq mi)
- Elevation: 73 m (240 ft)
- Highest elevation: 142 m (466 ft)
- Lowest elevation: 67 m (220 ft)
- Population (2023): 406
  - Density: 63.9/km^{2} (166/sq mi)
- Time zone: UTC+01:00 (CET)
  - Summer (DST): UTC+02:00 (CEST)
- INSEE/Postal code: 60250 /60000
- ^{1} French Land Register data, which excludes lakes, ponds, glaciers > 1 km^{2} (0.386 sq mi or 247 acres) and river estuaries.

Fouquenies (French pronunciation: [fukni]) is a commune in the Oise department in northern France.

== See also ==
- Communes of the Oise department
