= Saint-Omer-en-Chaussée station =

French railway station

Saint-Omer-en-Chaussée
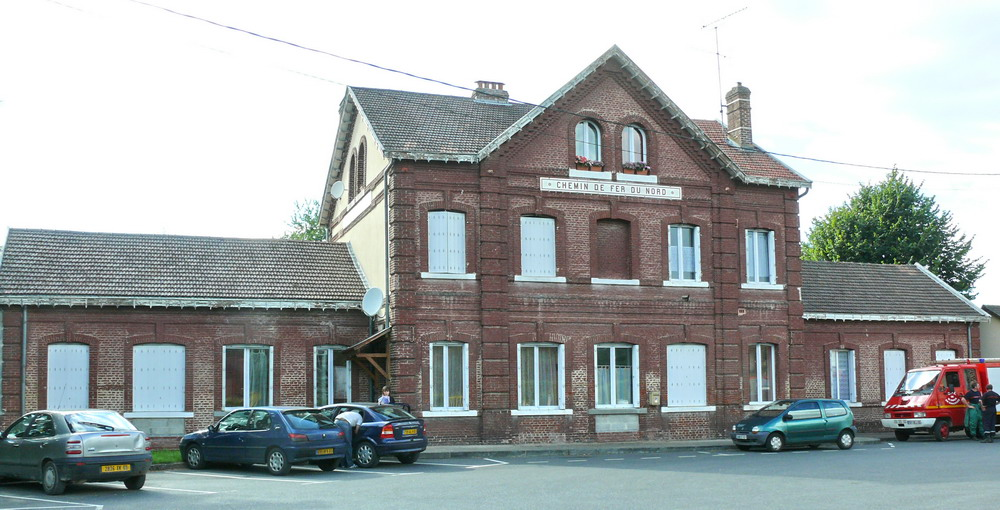
- The front of the station and the station's gate with a plaque of Compagnie du Nord.

General information
- Location: Rue de la Gare; Saint-Omer-en-Chaussée
- Coordinates: 49°31′49″N 1°59′49″E
- Owner: RFF/SNCF
- Line: Épinay-Villetaneuse–Le Tréport-Mers railway
- Platforms: 2

Construction
- Platform levels: 2

Other information
- Station code: 87313718

History
- Opened: July 1, 1875

Services
Preceding station	TER Hauts-de-France	Following station
Milly-sur-Thérain towards Beauvais	Proxi P30	Marseille-en-Beauvaisis towards Le Tréport-Mers
Location

Saint-Omer-en-Chaussée is a railway station located in the commune of Saint-Omer-en-Chaussée in the Oise department, France. It is served by TER Hauts-de-France trains from Beauvais to Le Tréport-Mers. The station was first opened on July 1, 1875. The station is accessible for disabled persons. It consists of a simple shelter, a ticket machine and a notice board. Trains cannot pass each other at the station anymore.

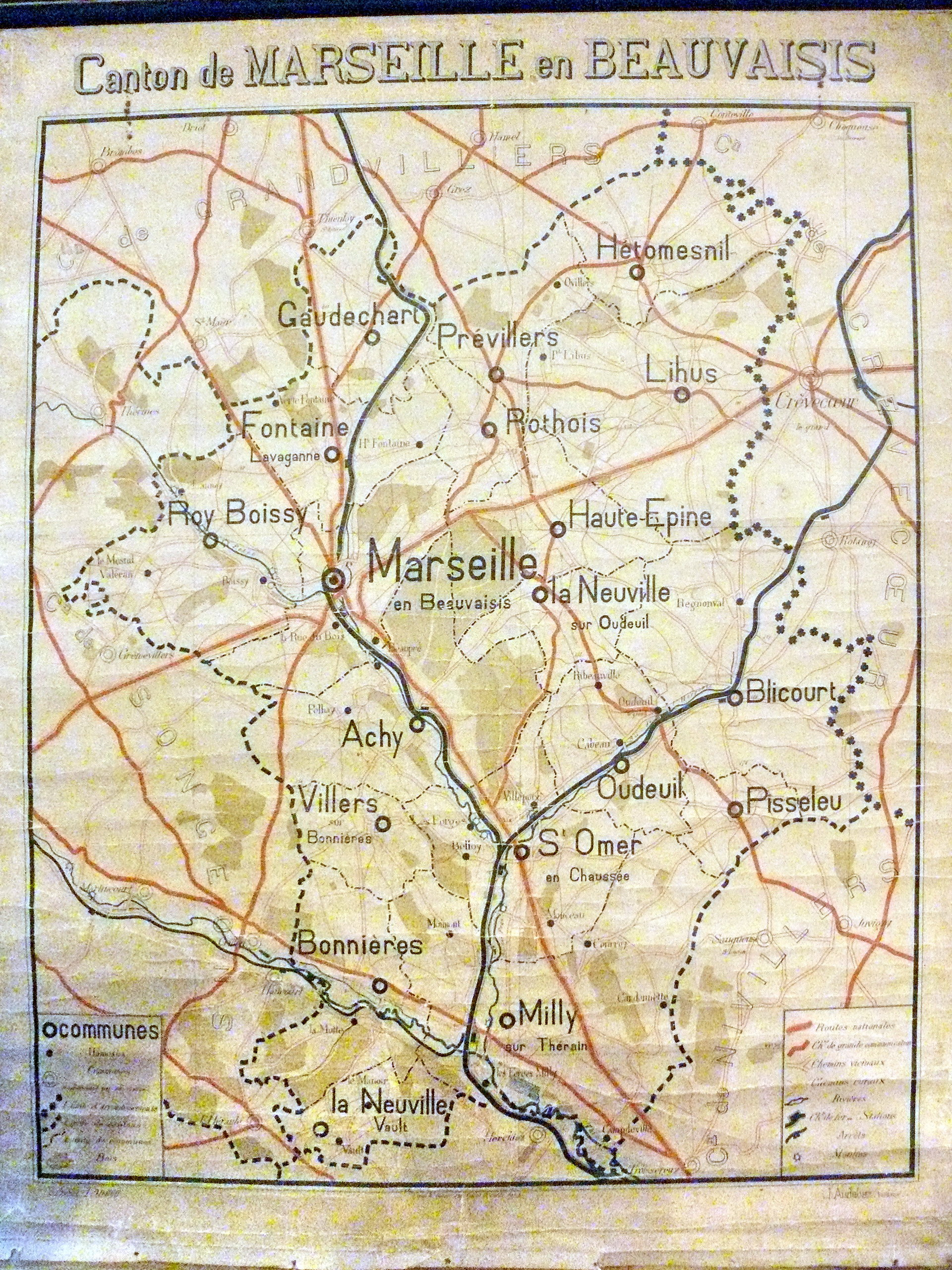
The station and the bifurcation of the railroad lines, seen on an old map of the canton of Marseille-en-Beauvaisis.

== History ==
At Saint-Omer-en-Chaussée, the former Beauvais–Amiens railway connected to the Épinay-Villetaneuse–Le Tréport-Mers railway. The line Beauvais - Amiens was discontinued on January 9, 1939 and the service was replaced with buses. The only remains of the goods station are the far end of the railway junction that led to the Maggi milk factory.

== Gallery ==
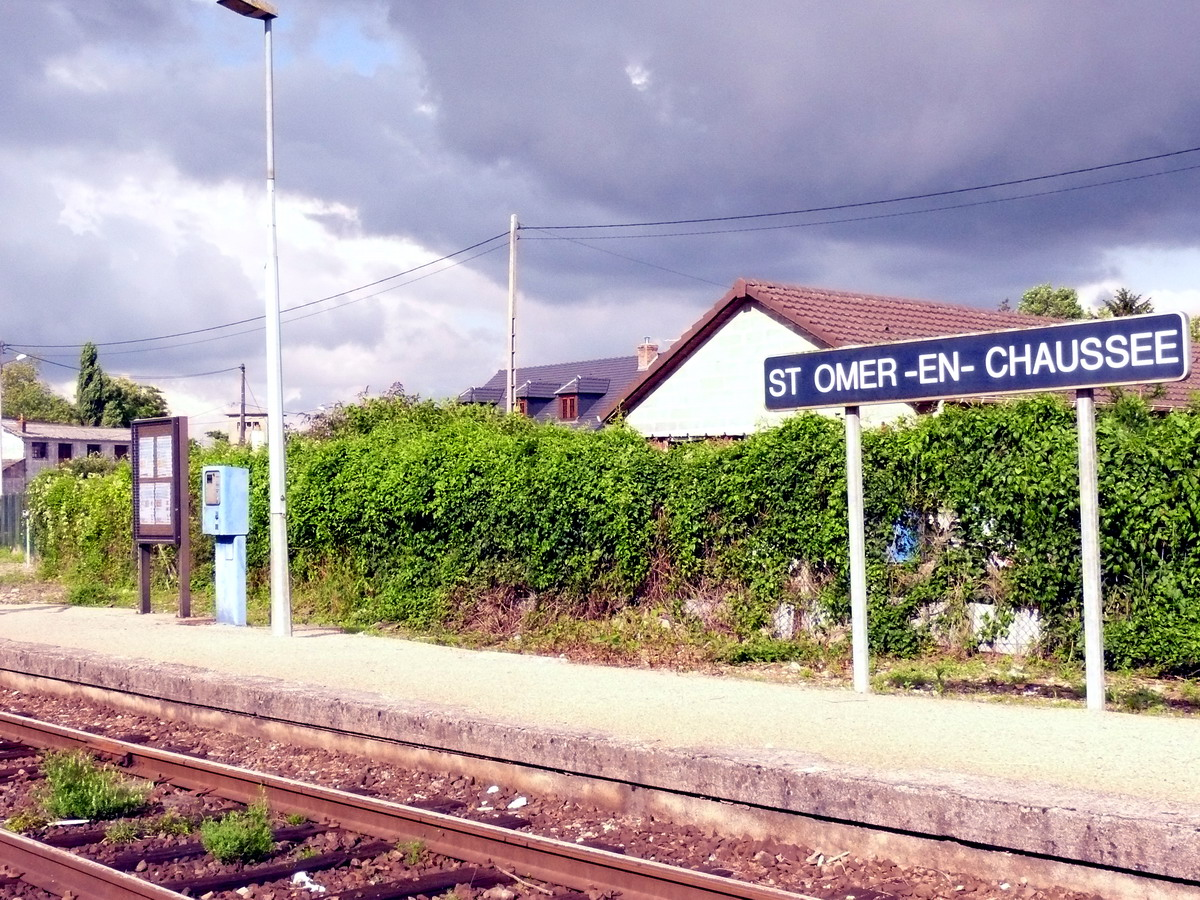
The current installations of the station

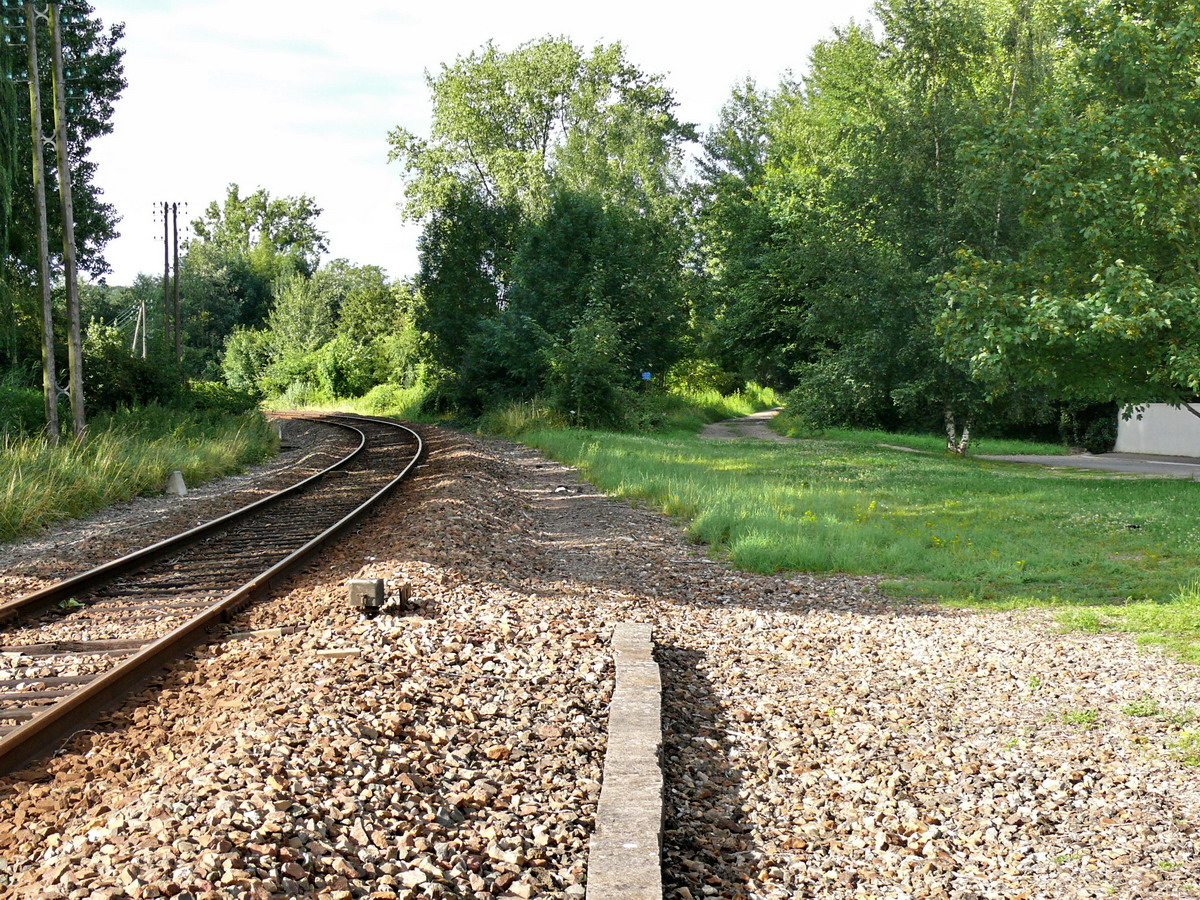
The former bifurcation of the lines to Amiens and Le Tréport.

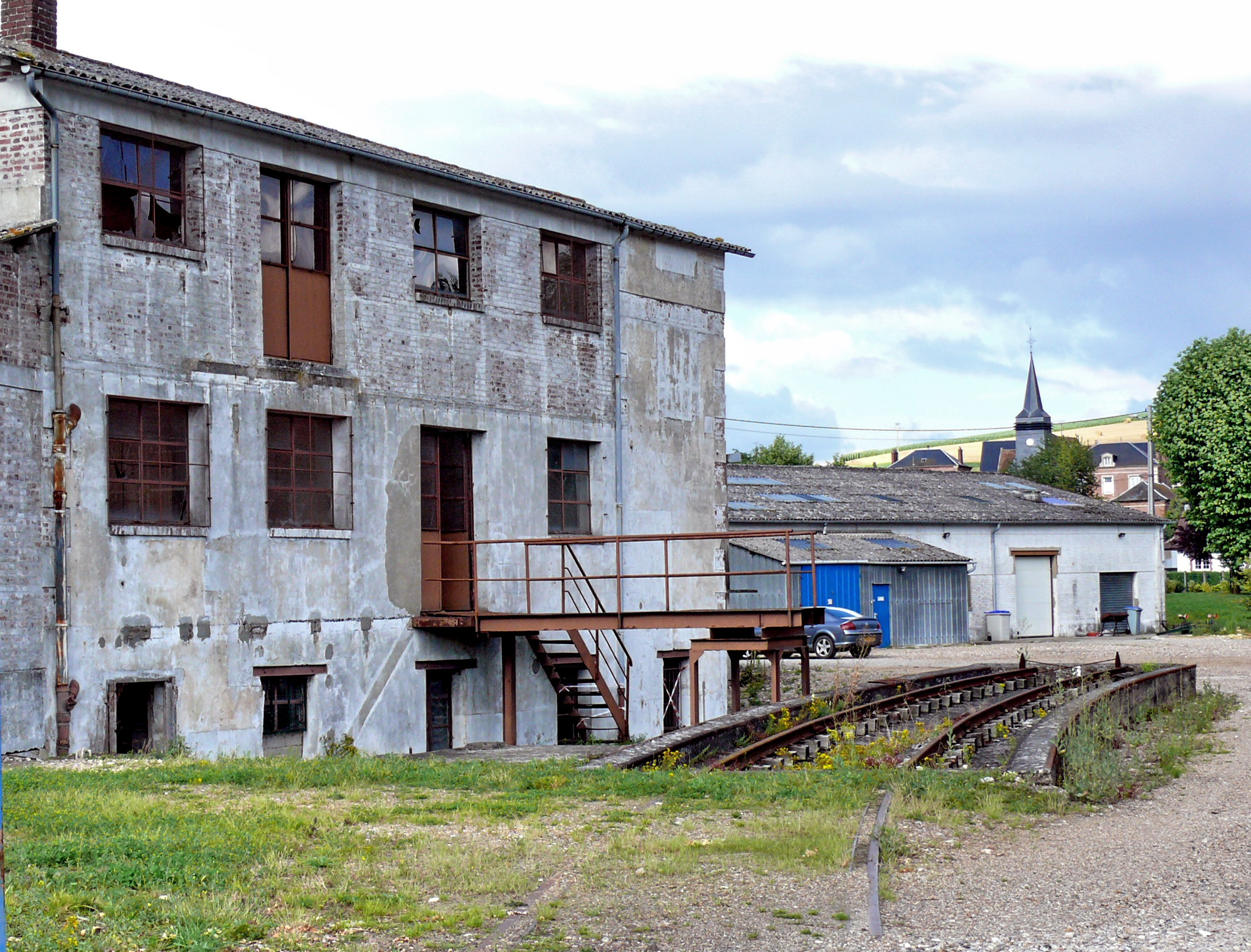
Old rails in the courtyard of the old Maggi milk factory

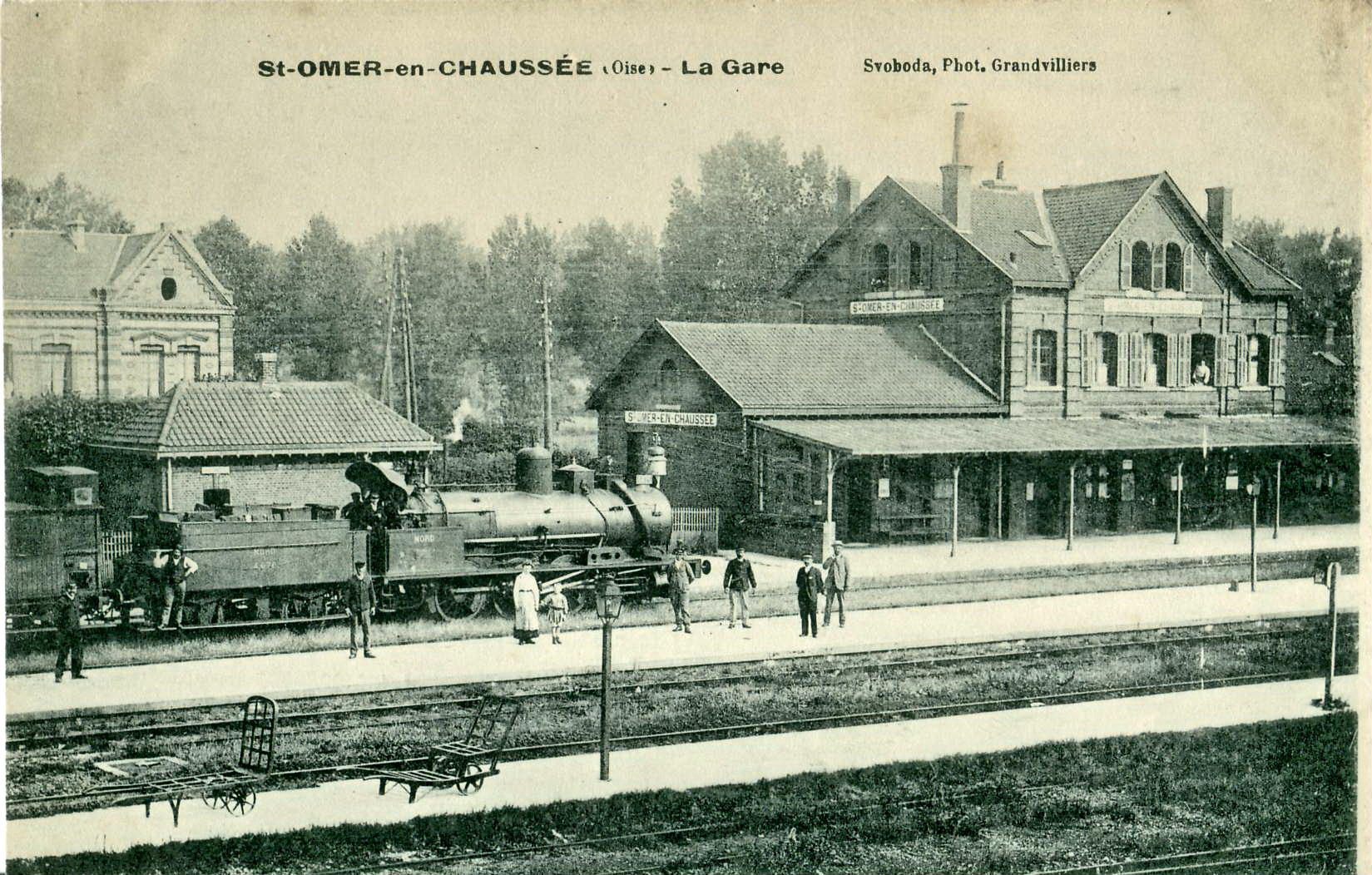
The station in the early 20th century. With three passenger platforms, the station was an important spot.

== See also ==
- List of SNCF stations in Hauts-de-France
