= Grandvilliers, Oise =

Grandvilliers
- Commune
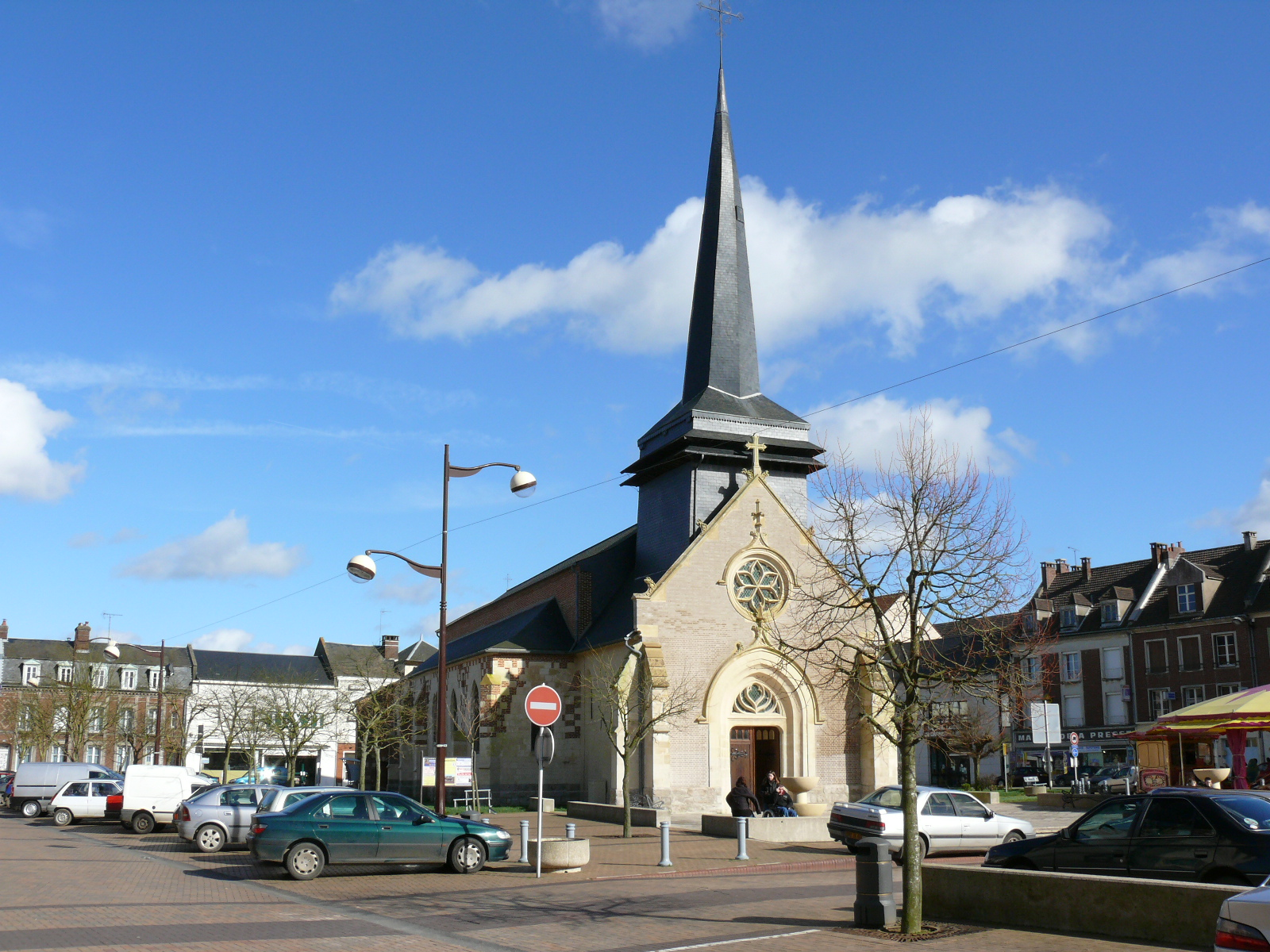
- The church in Grandvilliers

- Coat of arms
- Location of Grandvilliers
- Location within France Location within Hauts-de-France
- Coordinates: 49°40′01″N 1°56′30″E
- Country: France
- Region: Hauts-de-France
- Department: Oise
- Arrondissement: Beauvais
- Canton: Grandvilliers
- Intercommunality: Picardie Verte

Government
  - Mayor (2024–2026): Frédéric Douchet
- Area^{1}: 6.64 km^{2} (2.56 sq mi)
- Elevation: 193 m (633 ft)
- Highest elevation: 204 m (669 ft)
- Lowest elevation: 177 m (581 ft)
- Population (2023): 2,786
  - Density: 420/km^{2} (1,090/sq mi)
- Time zone: UTC+01:00 (CET)
  - Summer (DST): UTC+02:00 (CEST)
- INSEE/Postal code: 60286 /60210
- ^{1} French Land Register data, which excludes lakes, ponds, glaciers > 1 km^{2} (0.386 sq mi or 247 acres) and river estuaries.

Grandvilliers (French pronunciation: [ɡʁɑ̃vilje] or [ɡʁɑ̃vije]; Picard: Grandviyé) is a commune in the Oise department in northern France. Grandvilliers station has rail connections to Beauvais and Le Tréport.

== Population ==
Historical population
Year	Pop.	±% p.a.
1968	2,350	—
1975	2,661	+1.79%
1982	2,690	+0.15%
1990	2,761	+0.33%
1999	2,893	+0.52%
2007	3,056	+0.69%
2012	3,005	−0.34%
2017	2,940	−0.44%
2023	2,786	−0.89%
Source: INSEE

== Twinning ==
In 2004, the town was twinned with the Irish town of Athy in the south-west of County Kildare. The Irish twinning committee is named "La Balad'Irlandaise", and official visits take place every two years, while musical and student exchanges take place more regularly.

== See also ==
- Communes of the Oise department
