= Saint-Germain-la-Poterie =

- Commune
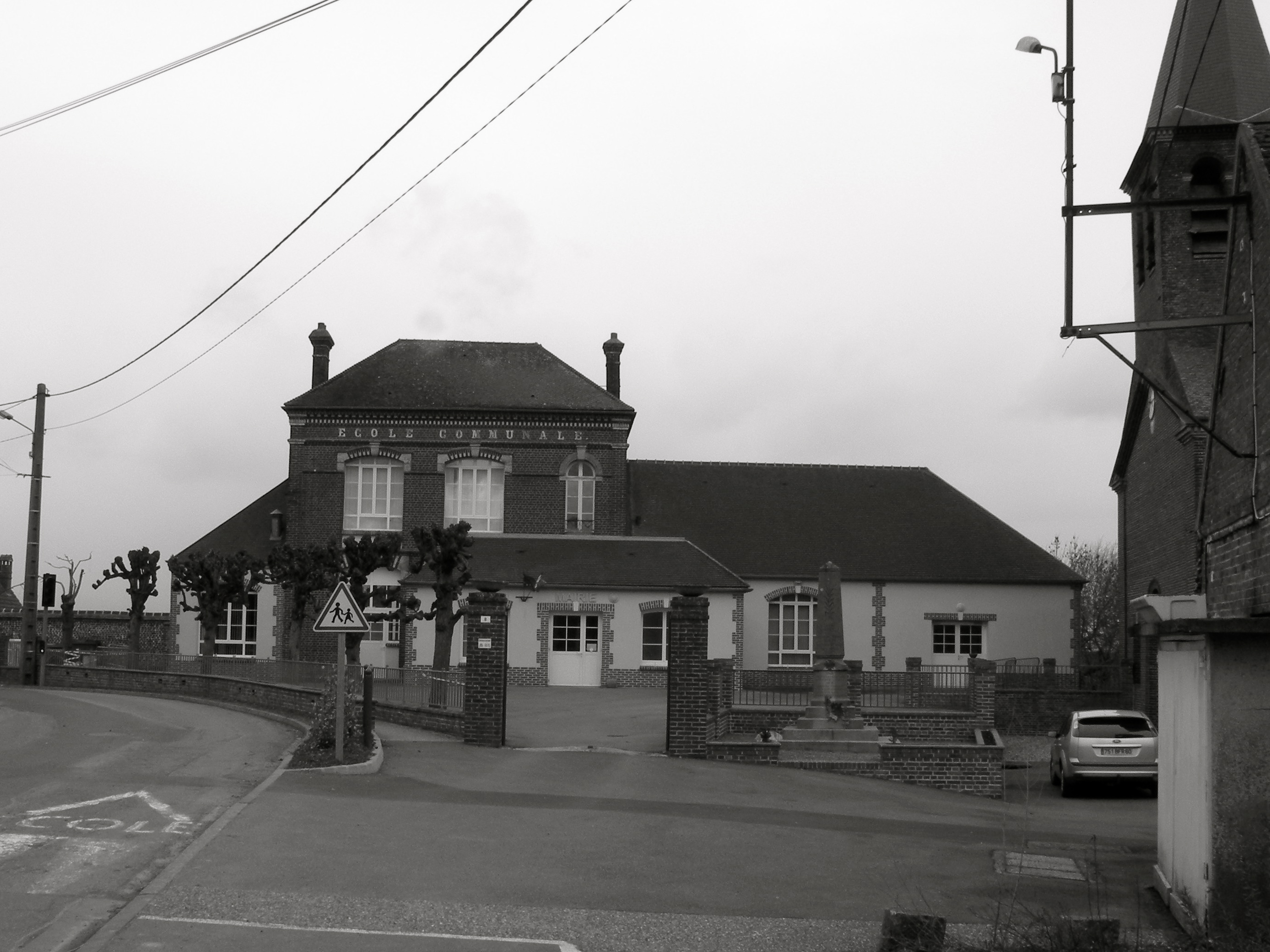
- The town hall in Saint-Germain-la-Poterie
- Location of Saint-Germain-la-Poterie
- Location within France Location within Hauts-de-France
- Coordinates: 49°26′46″N 1°59′00″E
- Country: France
- Region: Hauts-de-France
- Department: Oise
- Arrondissement: Beauvais
- Canton: Beauvais-1
- Intercommunality: CA Beauvaisis

Government
  - Mayor (2020–2026): Francis Bellou
- Area^{1}: 6.02 km^{2} (2.32 sq mi)
- Elevation: 170 m (560 ft)
- Highest elevation: 179 m (587 ft)
- Lowest elevation: 77 m (253 ft)
- Population (2023): 439
  - Density: 72.9/km^{2} (189/sq mi)
- Time zone: UTC+01:00 (CET)
  - Summer (DST): UTC+02:00 (CEST)
- INSEE/Postal code: 60576 /60650
- ^{1} French Land Register data, which excludes lakes, ponds, glaciers > 1 km^{2} (0.386 sq mi or 247 acres) and river estuaries.

Saint-Germain-la-Poterie (French pronunciation: [sɛ̃ ʒɛʁmɛ̃ la pɔtʁi]) is a commune in the Oise department in northern France.

== See also ==
- Communes of the Oise department
