= Herchies =

- Commune
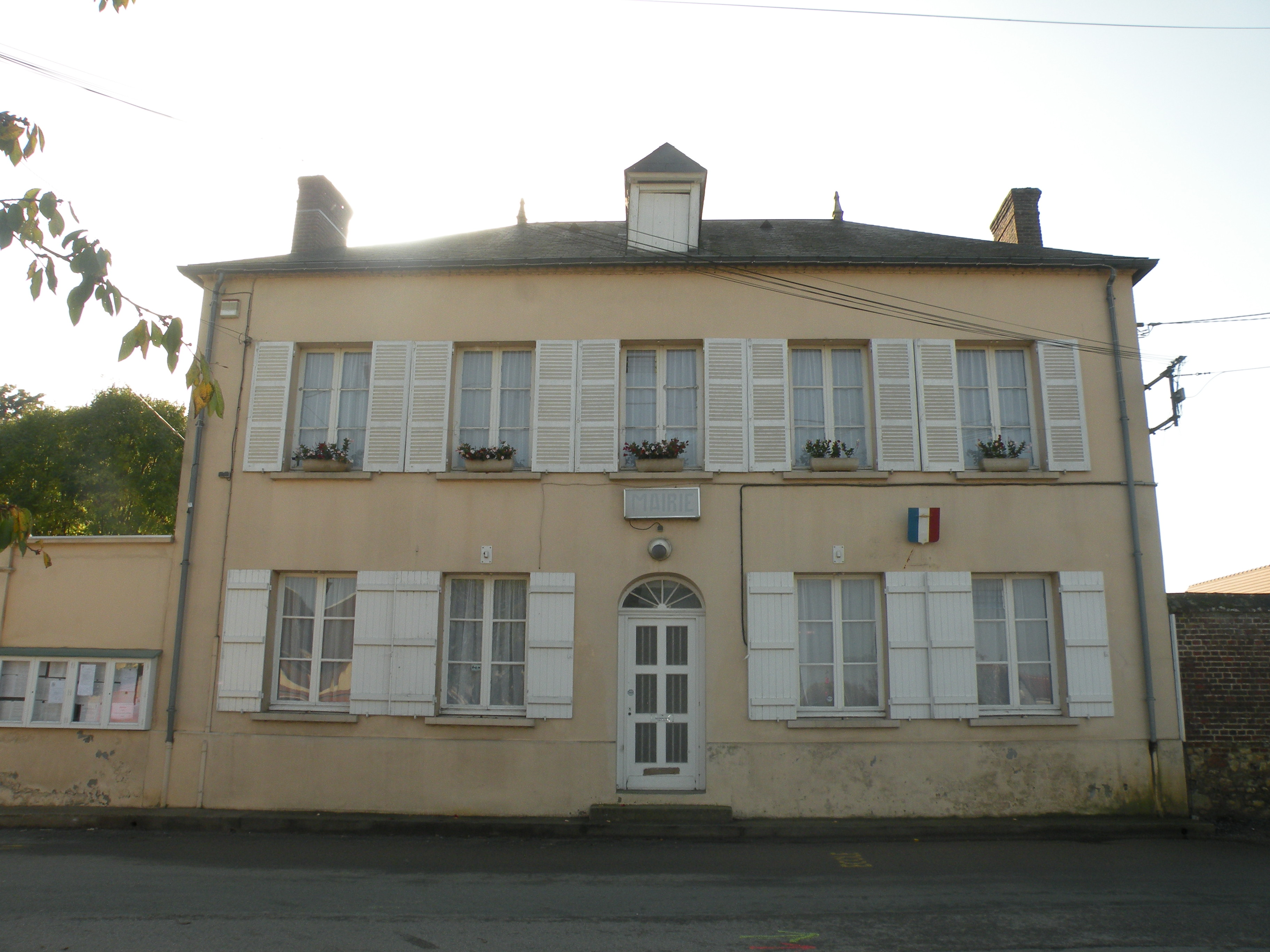
- The town hall in Herchies
- Location of Herchies
- Location within France Location within Hauts-de-France
- Coordinates: 49°29′19″N 2°00′45″E
- Country: France
- Region: Hauts-de-France
- Department: Oise
- Arrondissement: Beauvais
- Canton: Beauvais-1
- Intercommunality: CA Beauvaisis

Government
  - Mayor (2020–2026): Jean-Charles Paillart
- Area^{1}: 5.46 km^{2} (2.11 sq mi)
- Elevation: 78 m (256 ft)
- Highest elevation: 141 m (463 ft)
- Lowest elevation: 74 m (243 ft)
- Population (2023): 582
  - Density: 107/km^{2} (276/sq mi)
- Time zone: UTC+01:00 (CET)
  - Summer (DST): UTC+02:00 (CEST)
- INSEE/Postal code: 60310 /60112
- ^{1} French Land Register data, which excludes lakes, ponds, glaciers > 1 km^{2} (0.386 sq mi or 247 acres) and river estuaries.

Herchies (French pronunciation: [ɛʁʃi]) is a commune in the Oise department in northern France.

== See also ==
- Communes of the Oise department
