= Pierrefitte-en-Beauvaisis =

- Commune
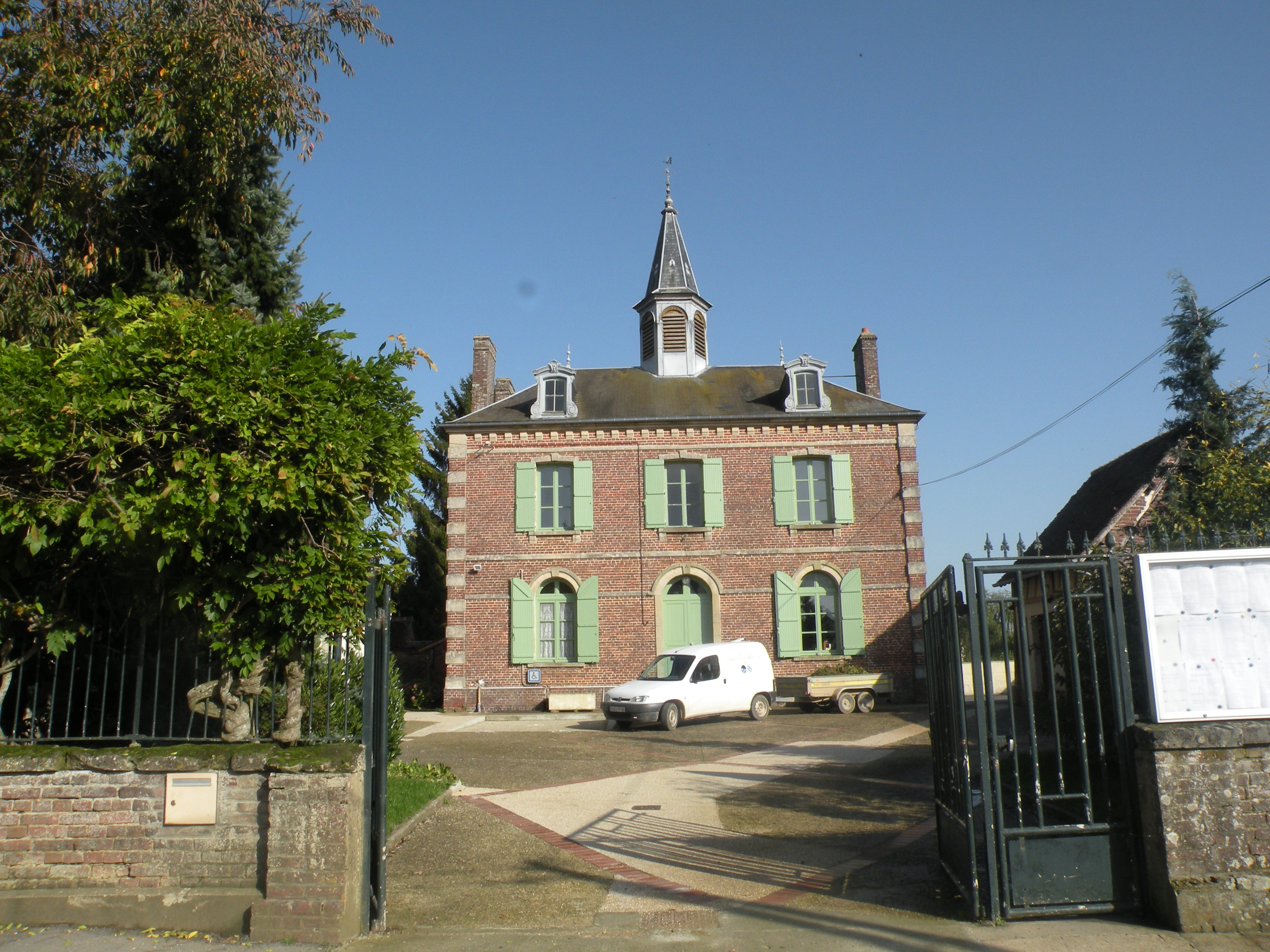
- The town hall in Pierrefitte-en-Beauvaisis
- Location of Pierrefitte-en-Beauvaisis
- Location within France Location within Hauts-de-France
- Coordinates: 49°28′34″N 1°58′54″E
- Country: France
- Region: Hauts-de-France
- Department: Oise
- Arrondissement: Beauvais
- Canton: Beauvais-1
- Intercommunality: CA Beauvaisis

Government
  - Mayor (2020–2026): Michel Routier
- Area^{1}: 5.67 km^{2} (2.19 sq mi)
- Elevation: 132 m (433 ft)
- Highest elevation: 205 m (673 ft)
- Lowest elevation: 98 m (322 ft)
- Population (2023): 365
  - Density: 64.4/km^{2} (167/sq mi)
- Time zone: UTC+01:00 (CET)
  - Summer (DST): UTC+02:00 (CEST)
- INSEE/Postal code: 60490 /60112
- ^{1} French Land Register data, which excludes lakes, ponds, glaciers > 1 km^{2} (0.386 sq mi or 247 acres) and river estuaries.

Pierrefitte-en-Beauvaisis is a commune in the Oise department in northern France.

== See also ==
- Communes of the Oise department
