= Milly-sur-Thérain =

- Commune
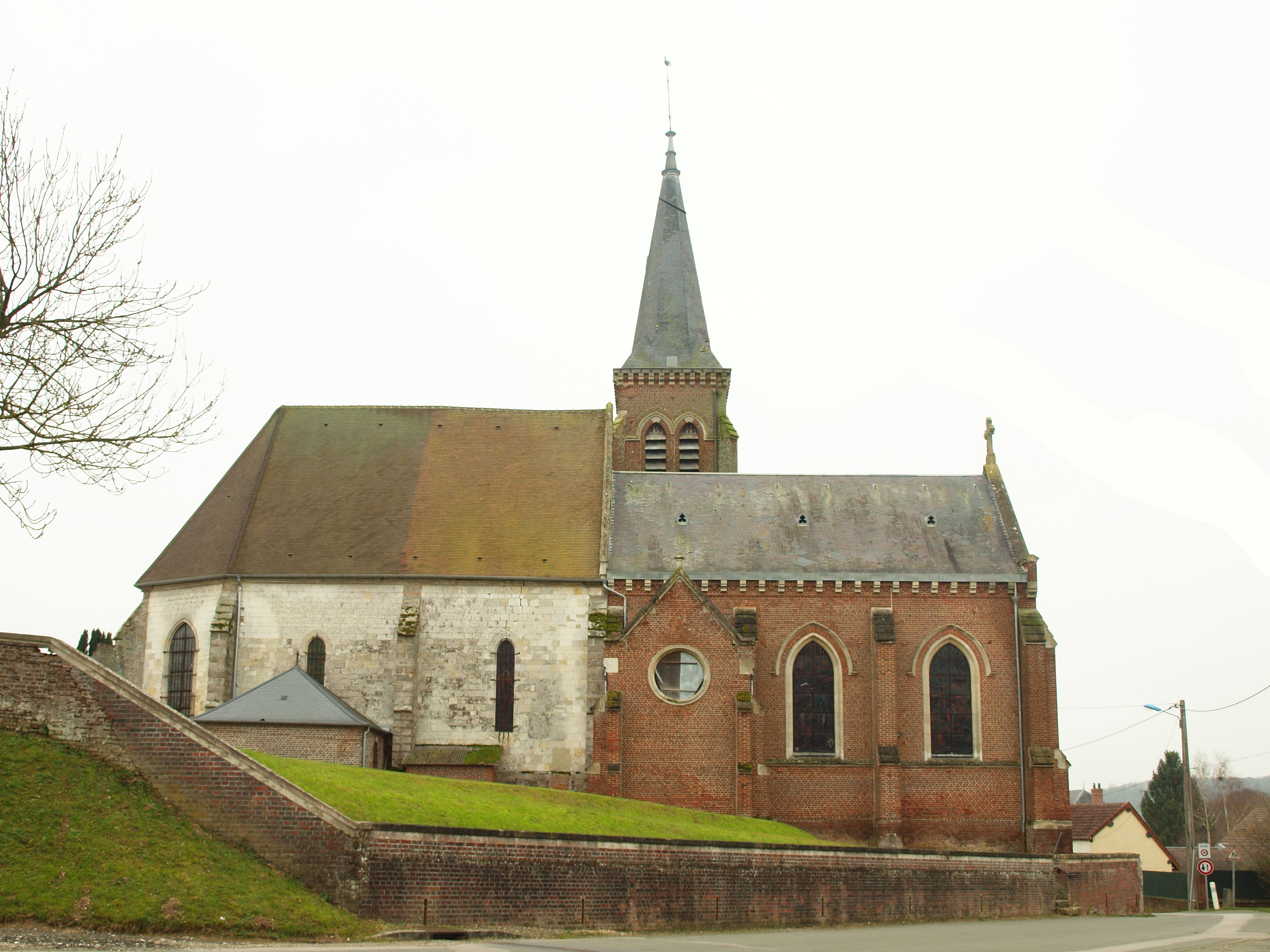
- The church in Milly-sur-Thérain
- Location of Milly-sur-Thérain
- Location within France Location within Hauts-de-France
- Coordinates: 49°30′11″N 1°59′46″E
- Country: France
- Region: Hauts-de-France
- Department: Oise
- Arrondissement: Beauvais
- Canton: Beauvais-1
- Intercommunality: CA Beauvaisis

Government
  - Mayor (2020–2026): Christophe de l'Hamaide
- Area^{1}: 19.57 km^{2} (7.56 sq mi)
- Elevation: 84 m (276 ft)
- Highest elevation: 164 m (538 ft)
- Lowest elevation: 72 m (236 ft)
- Population (2023): 1,922
  - Density: 98.21/km^{2} (254.4/sq mi)
- Time zone: UTC+01:00 (CET)
  - Summer (DST): UTC+02:00 (CEST)
- INSEE/Postal code: 60403 /60112
- ^{1} French Land Register data, which excludes lakes, ponds, glaciers > 1 km^{2} (0.386 sq mi or 247 acres) and river estuaries.

Milly-sur-Thérain (French pronunciation: [miji syʁ teʁɛ̃], literally Milly on Thérain) is a commune in the Oise department in northern France. Milly-sur-Thérain station has rail connections to Beauvais and Le Tréport.

== See also ==
- Communes of the Oise department
