= Le Mont-Saint-Adrien =

- Commune
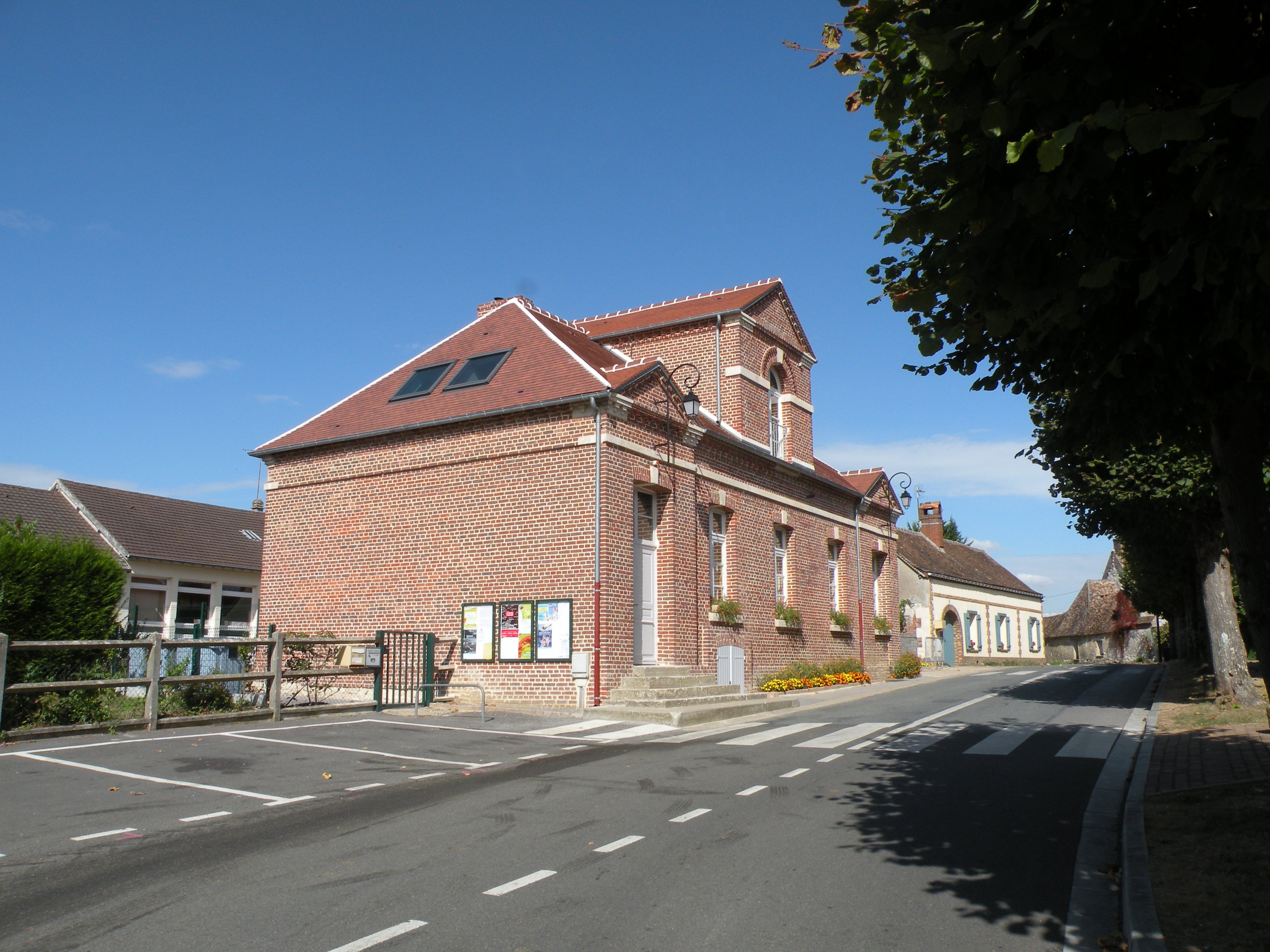
- The town hall in Le Mont-Saint-Adrien
- Location of Le Mont-Saint-Adrien
- Location within France Location within Hauts-de-France
- Coordinates: 49°26′50″N 2°00′19″E
- Country: France
- Region: Hauts-de-France
- Department: Oise
- Arrondissement: Beauvais
- Canton: Beauvais-1
- Intercommunality: CA Beauvaisis

Government
  - Mayor (2020–2026): Jean-Philippe Amans
- Area^{1}: 7.74 km^{2} (2.99 sq mi)
- Elevation: 172 m (564 ft)
- Highest elevation: 173 m (568 ft)
- Lowest elevation: 89 m (292 ft)
- Population (2023): 652
  - Density: 84.2/km^{2} (218/sq mi)
- Time zone: UTC+01:00 (CET)
  - Summer (DST): UTC+02:00 (CEST)
- INSEE/Postal code: 60428 /60650
- ^{1} French Land Register data, which excludes lakes, ponds, glaciers > 1 km^{2} (0.386 sq mi or 247 acres) and river estuaries.

Le Mont-Saint-Adrien (French pronunciation: [lə mɔ̃ sɛ̃.t‿adʁijɛ̃]) is a commune in the Oise department in northern France.

== See also ==
- Communes of the Oise department
