= Feuquières–Broquiers station =

French railway station

Coordinates: 49°39′16″N 1°49′51″E

Feuquières–Broquiers
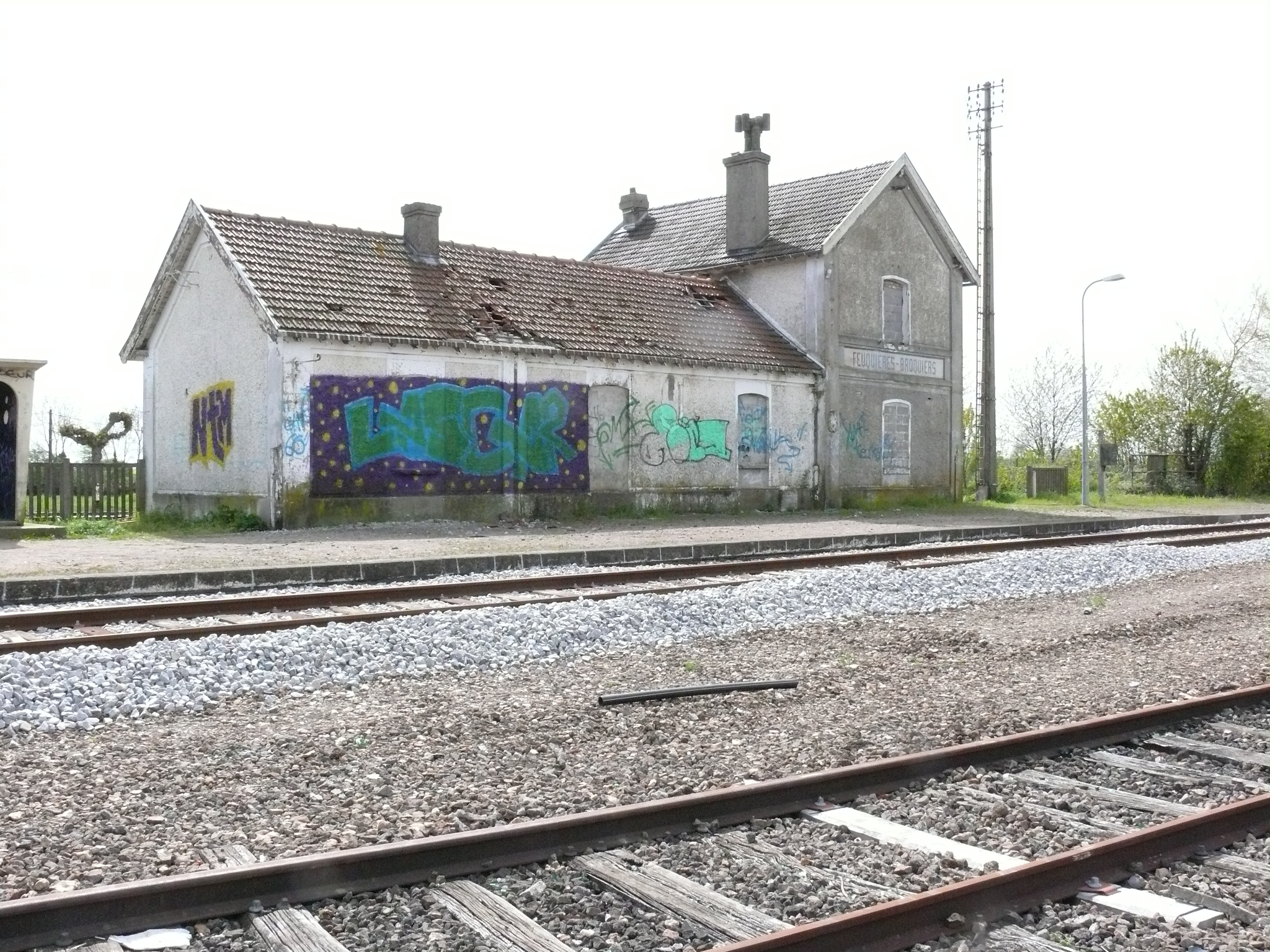
- The station in 2008

General information
- Location: Place de la Gare; Feuquières, France
- Owner: RFF/SNCF
- Line: Épinay-Villetaneuse–Le Tréport-Mers railway
- Platforms: 1

Other information
- Station code: 87313742

History
- Opened: 1875

Services
| Preceding station | TER Hauts-de-France | Following station |
|---|---|---|
| Grandvilliers towards Beauvais | Proxi P30 | Abancourt towards Le Tréport-Mers |
Location

Feuquières–Broquiers is a railway station located between Broquiers and Feuquières in the Oise department, France. It is situated on the Beauvais-Abancourt section of the Épinay-Villetaneuse–Le Tréport-Mers railway. It is an unattended station, served by TER Hauts-de-France trains between Beauvais and Tréport-Mers.

Near the station, towards Beauvais, there is a branch line to the Saverglass glass factory.

== History ==
During the First World War, a railway was built from Feuquières to Ponthoile on the Longueau–Boulogne railway, north of Noyelles-sur-Mer. It allowed for the military convoys to reach the Abbeville-Eu railway and the Longueau–Boulogne railway without passing into enemy fire.

The line, which was completed within a thousand days, played a major role in the final offensives of the Allies during the late summer and fall of 1918. Lacking commercial interest, the line was abandoned in 1920.

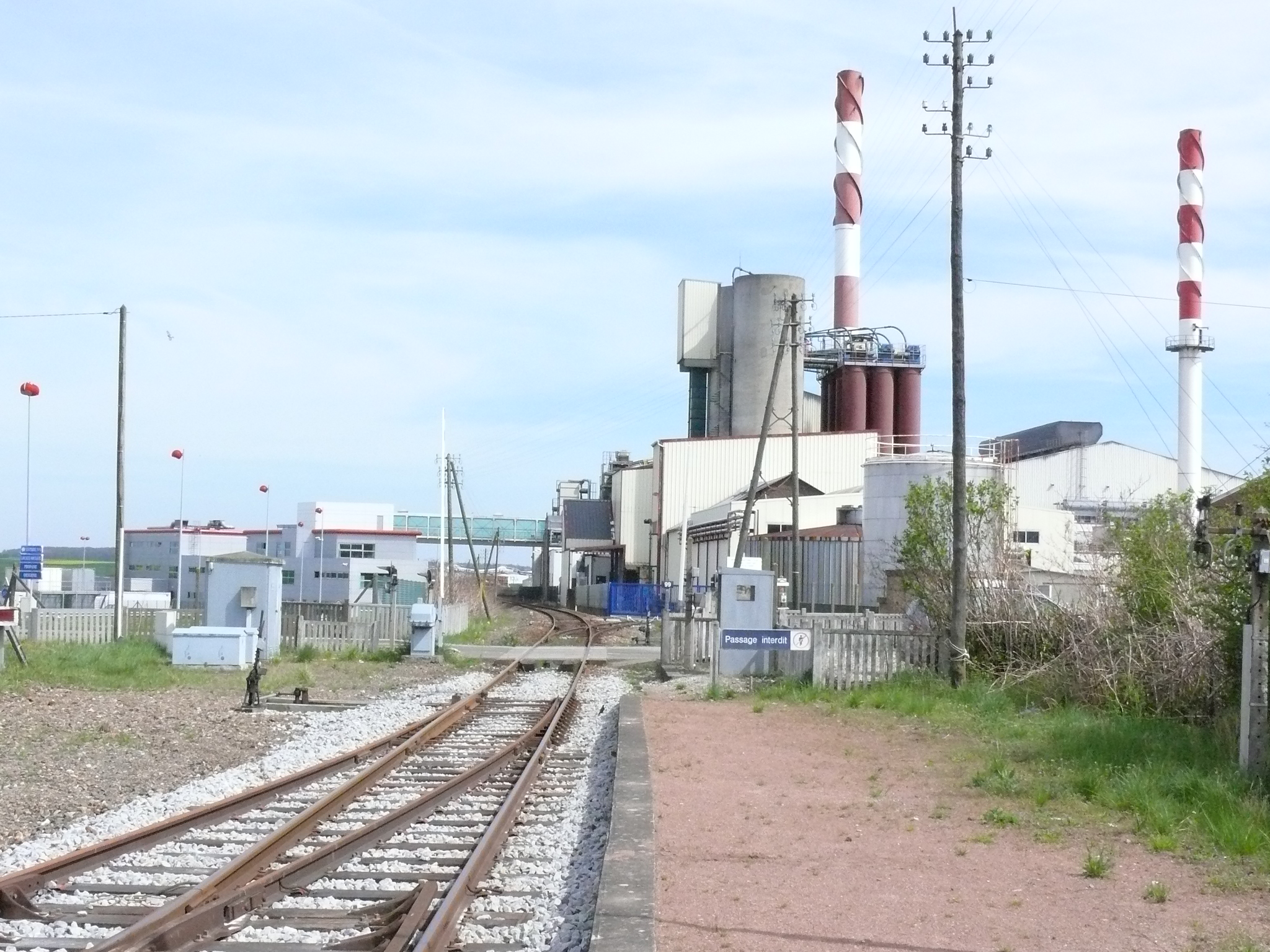
The industrial connector with Saverglass

== See also ==
- List of SNCF stations in Hauts-de-France
