= Saint-Omer-en-Chaussée =

- Commune
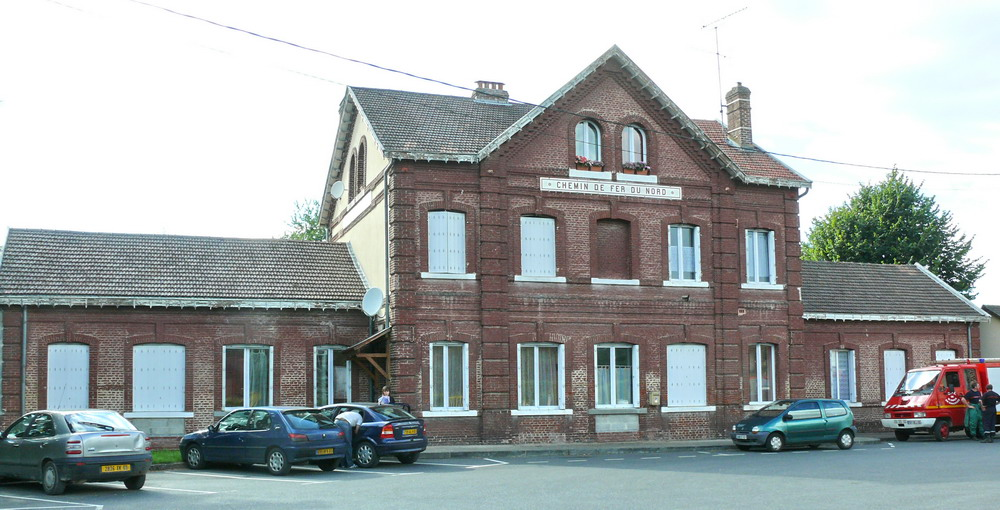
- The railway station in Saint-Omer-en-Chaussée
- Location of Saint-Omer-en-Chaussée
- Location within France Location within Hauts-de-France
- Coordinates: 49°31′57″N 2°00′11″E
- Country: France
- Region: Hauts-de-France
- Department: Oise
- Arrondissement: Beauvais
- Canton: Grandvilliers
- Intercommunality: Picardie Verte

Government
  - Mayor (2020–2026): André Solewyn
- Area^{1}: 10.33 km^{2} (3.99 sq mi)
- Elevation: 101 m (331 ft)
- Highest elevation: 177 m (581 ft)
- Lowest elevation: 85 m (279 ft)
- Population (2023): 1,172
  - Density: 113.5/km^{2} (293.8/sq mi)
- Time zone: UTC+01:00 (CET)
  - Summer (DST): UTC+02:00 (CEST)
- INSEE/Postal code: 60590 /60860
- ^{1} French Land Register data, which excludes lakes, ponds, glaciers > 1 km^{2} (0.386 sq mi or 247 acres) and river estuaries.

Saint-Omer-en-Chaussée (French pronunciation: [sɛ̃t‿omɛʁ ɑ̃ ʃose]) is a commune in the Oise department in northern France. Saint-Omer-en-Chaussée station has rail connections to Beauvais and Le Tréport.

== See also ==
- Communes of the Oise department
