= Marseille-en-Beauvaisis station =

French railway station

Marseille-en-Beauvaisis
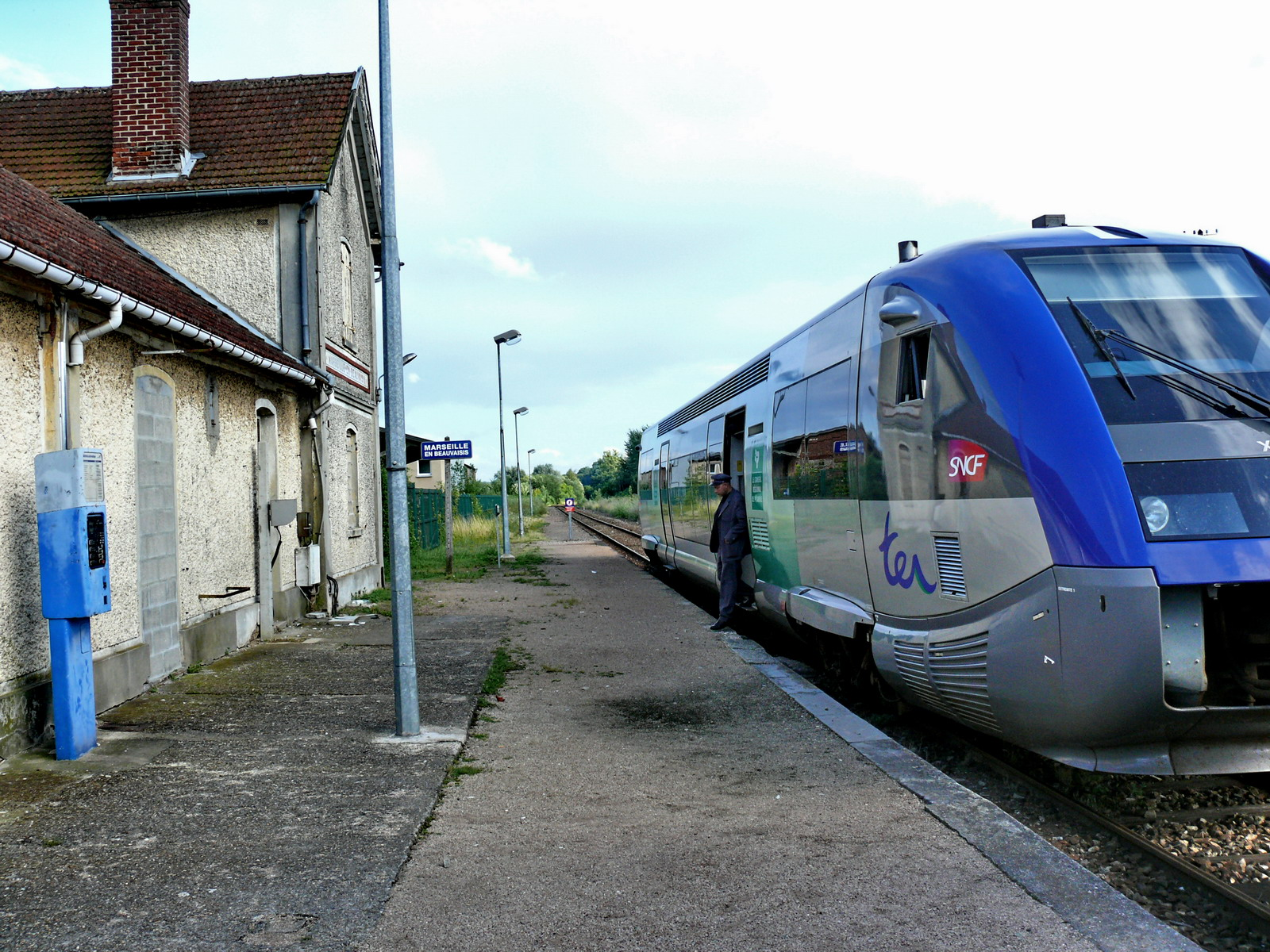
- Modern railcar at the station

General information
- Location: Rue de la Gare, Marseille-en-Beauvaisis
- Coordinates: 49°34′17″N 1°57′14″E
- Owner: RFF/SNCF
- Line: Épinay-Villetaneuse–Le Tréport-Mers railway
- Platforms: 1

Construction
- Platform levels: 1

Other information
- Station code: 87313726

History
- Opened: 1875

Services
Preceding station	TER Hauts-de-France	Following station
Saint-Omer-en-Chaussée towards Beauvais	Proxi P30	Grandvilliers towards Le Tréport-Mers
Location

Marseille-en-Beauvaisis is a railway station located in the commune of Marseille-en-Beauvaisis in the Oise department, France. It is served by TER Hauts-de-France trains from Beauvais to Le Tréport-Mers. The station serves about 20,000 passengers a year. As of 2022 the station is served by 9 trains in each direction on weekdays and 3 on Sundays.

Services at the station are nowadays limited to a shelter, a ticket distributing machine and a time table. Trains cannot pass each other at the station, and there are no railway signals. The old station building is dilapidated. In the 19th century, the station was known as Marseille-le-Petit, which was the informal name of the commune at the time.

== The projects ==
The communauté de communes de la Picardie Verte plans a modernization and renovations of parking lots at the stations in its area, and the introduction of a shared taxi service. This plan is the objective of a territorial development contract, signed by the general council of Oise in 2005.

=== History ===
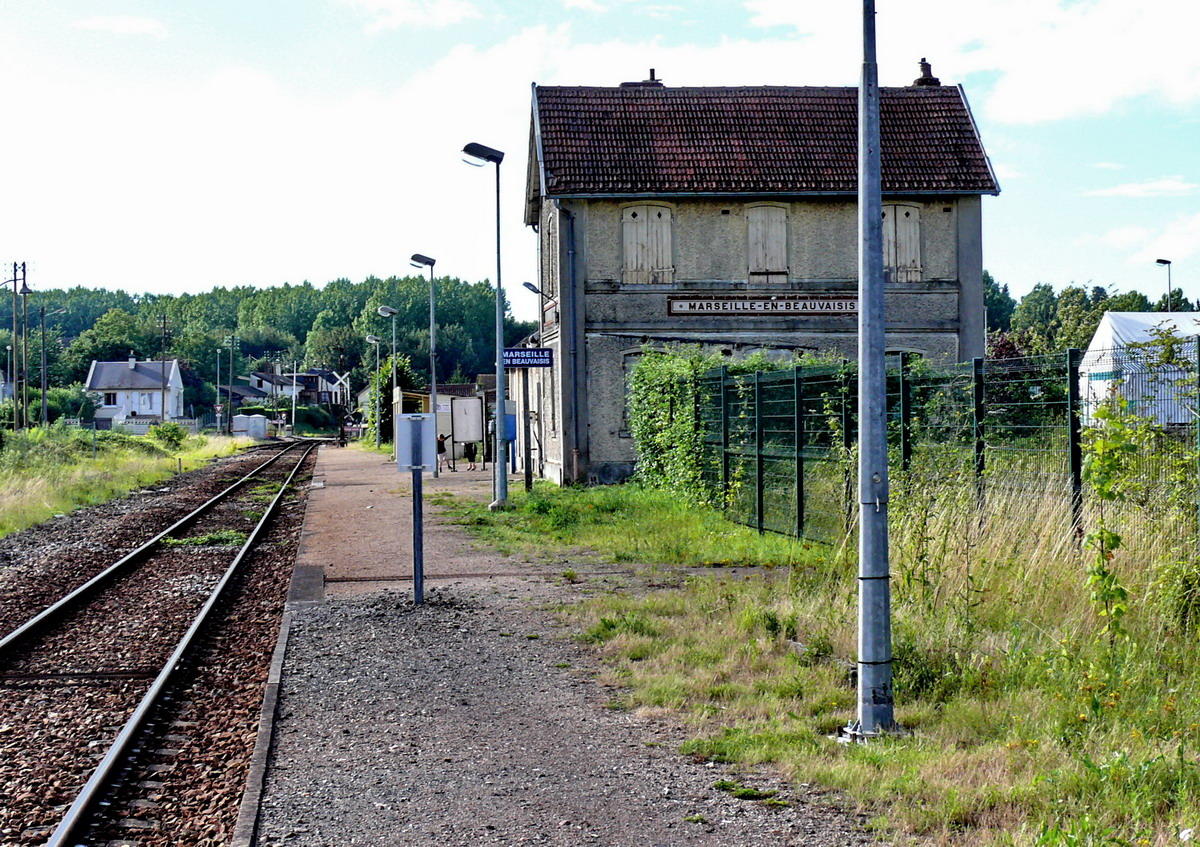
The dilapidated station

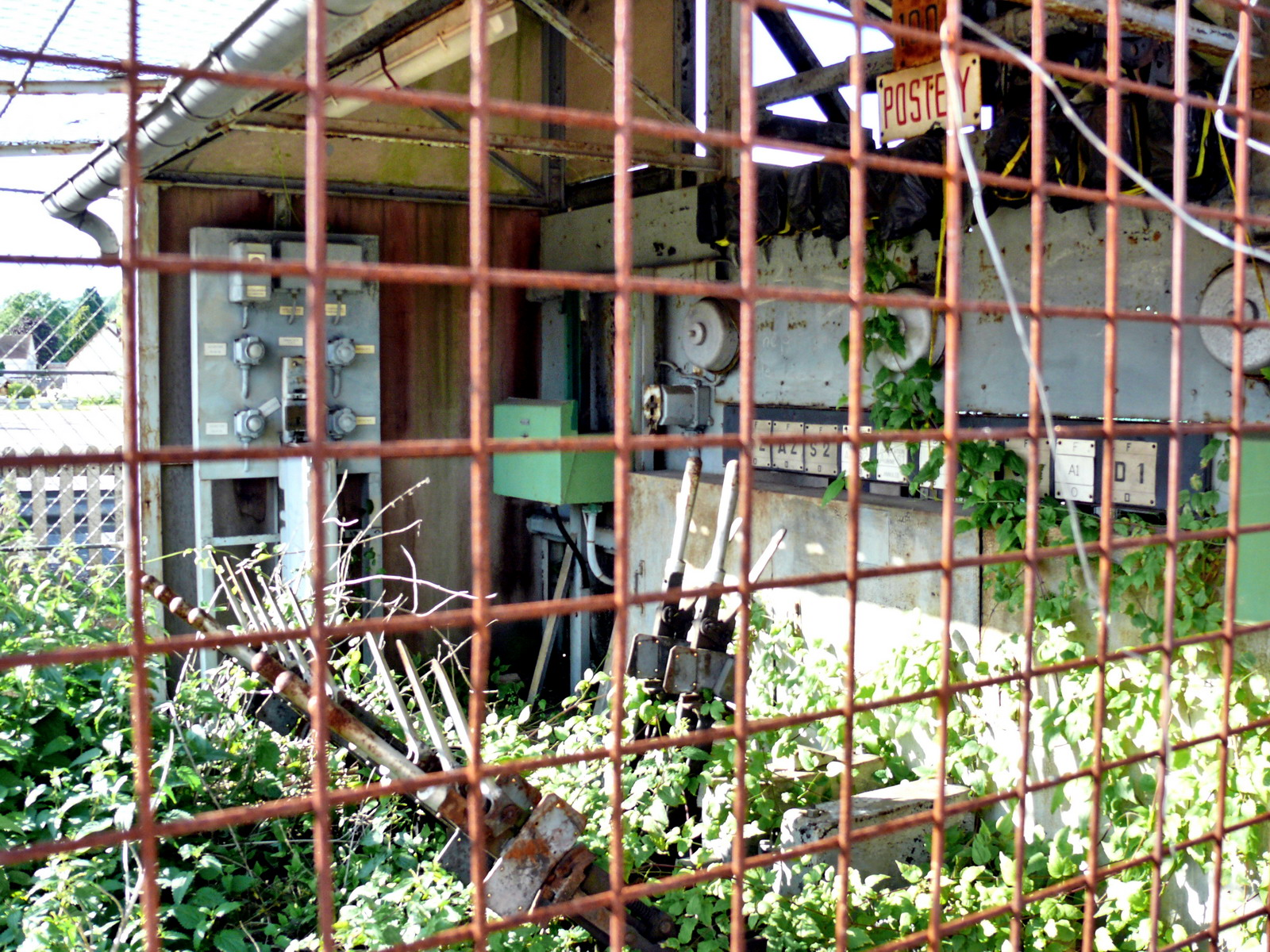
The old railroad switch controls

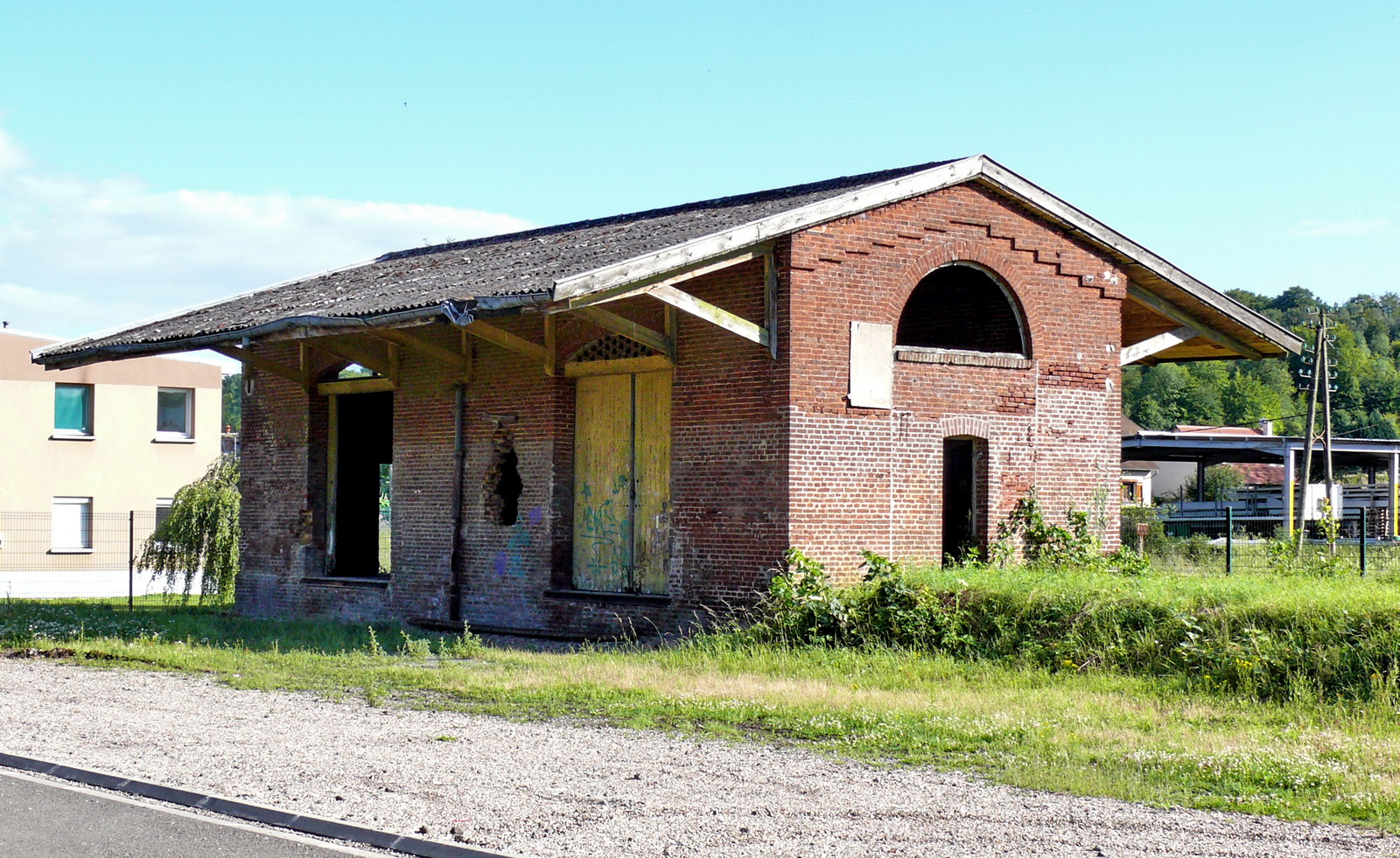
The abandoned goods station

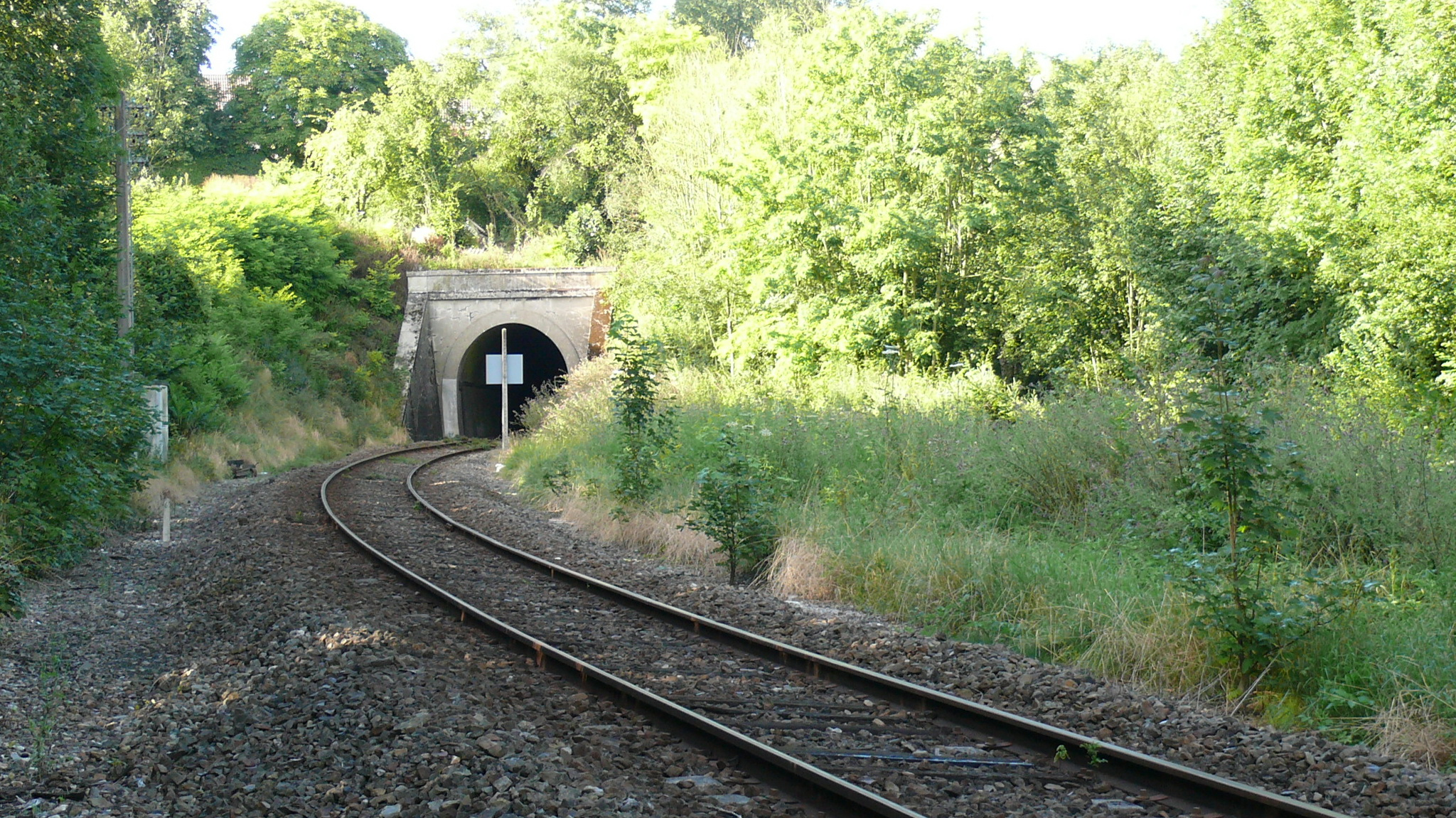
The entrance of the 538 m long tunnel which passes under the town.

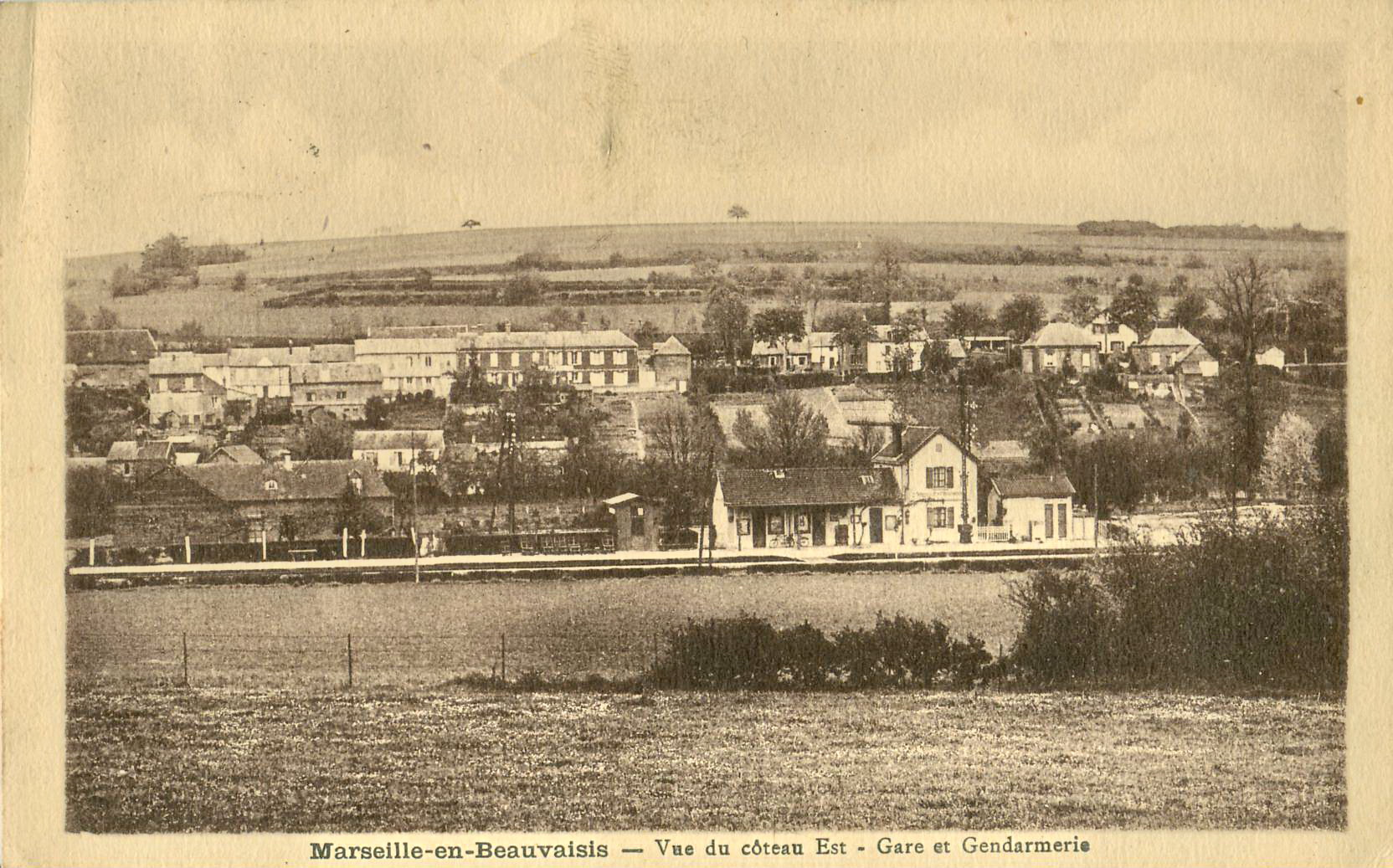
View of the station

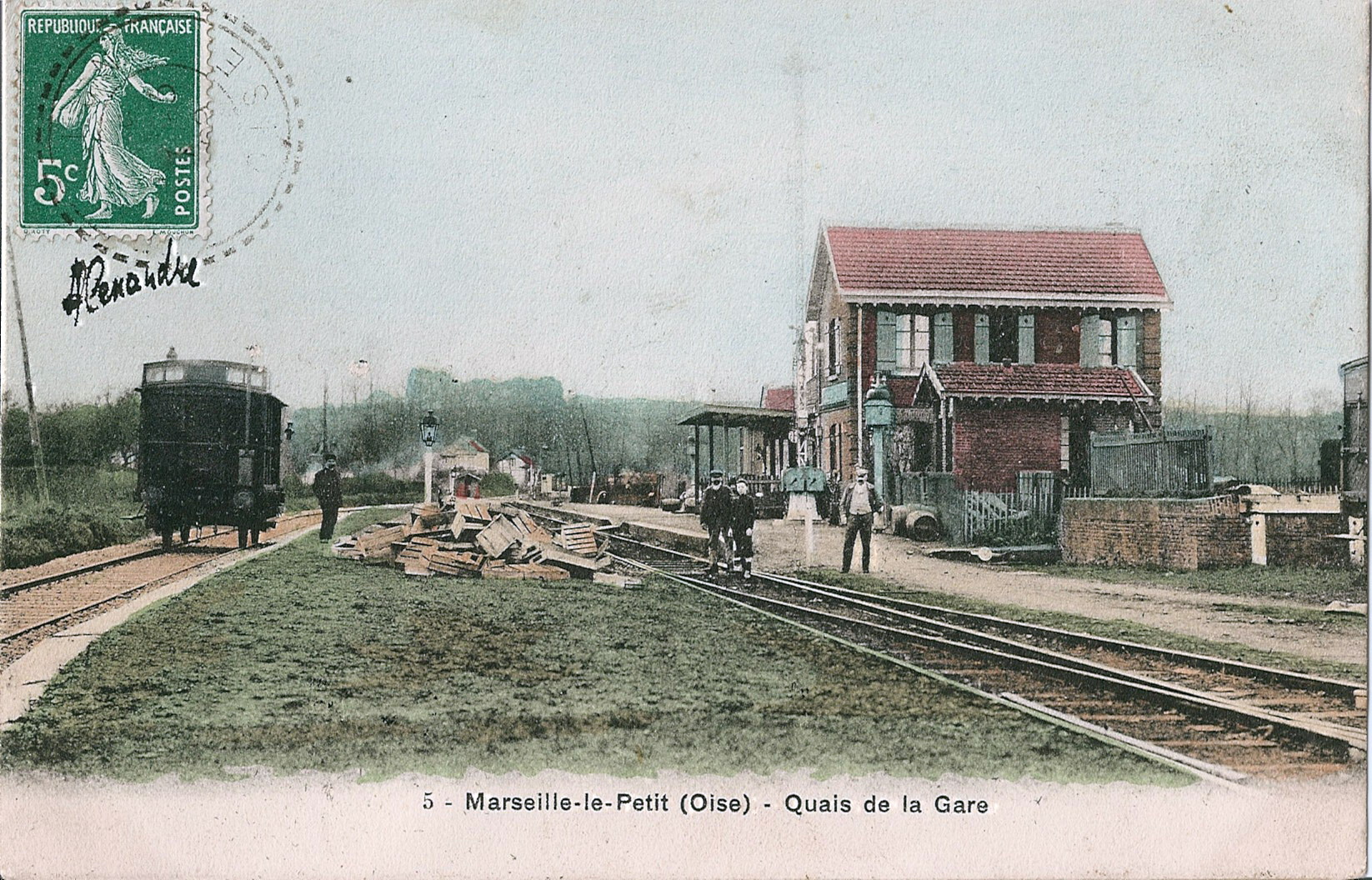
The view of the platforms facing Le Tréport in 1909.

== See also ==
- List of SNCF stations in Hauts-de-France
