= Marseille-en-Beauvaisis =

- Commune
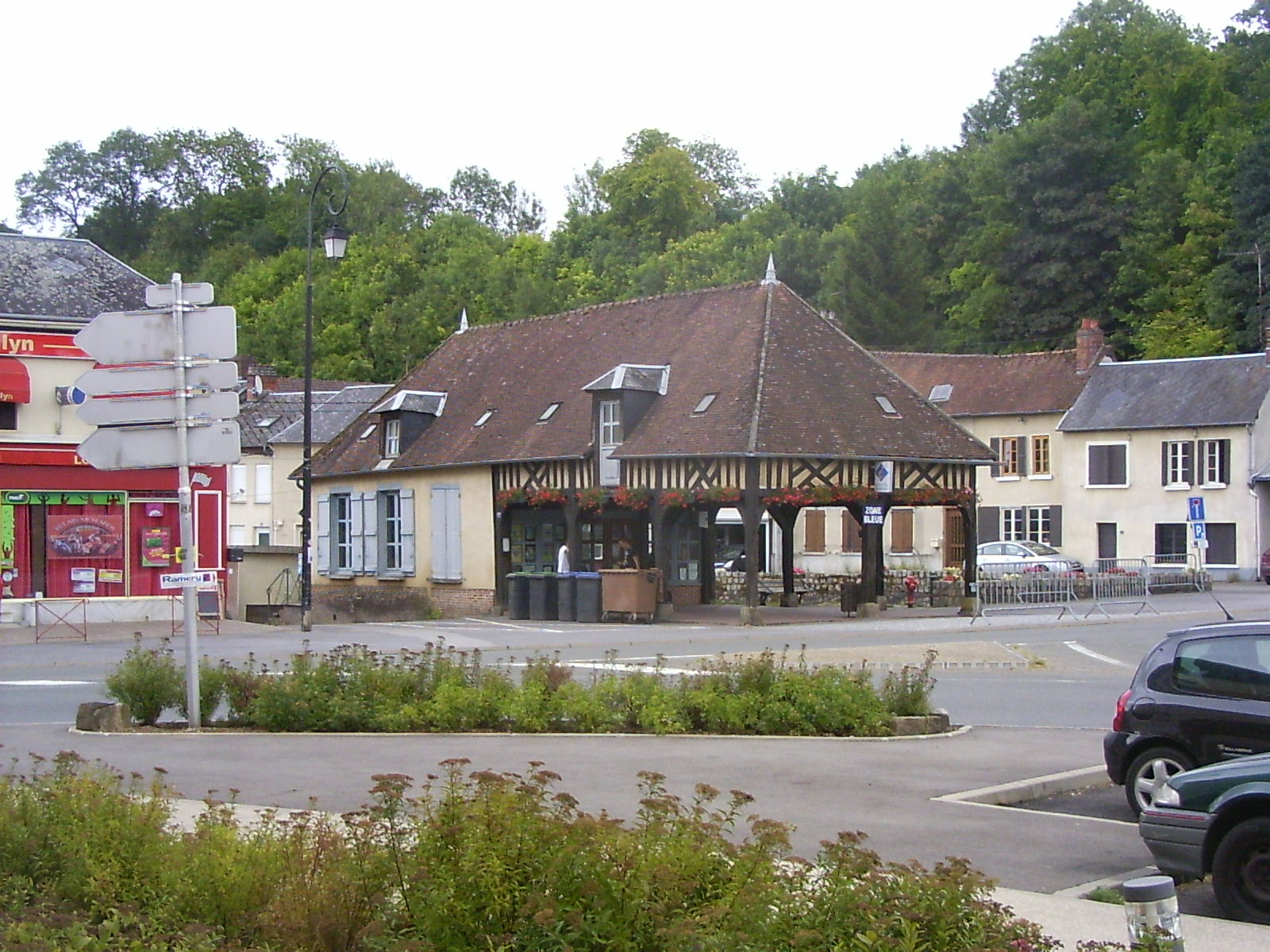
- The town hall in Marseille-en-Beauvaisis

- Coat of arms
- Location of Marseille-en-Beauvaisis
- Location within France Location within Hauts-de-France
- Coordinates: 49°34′35″N 1°57′23″E
- Country: France
- Region: Hauts-de-France
- Department: Oise
- Arrondissement: Beauvais
- Canton: Grandvilliers
- Intercommunality: Picardie Verte

Government
  - Mayor (2022–2026): Isabelle Dubut
- Area^{1}: 8.26 km^{2} (3.19 sq mi)
- Elevation: 123 m (404 ft)
- Highest elevation: 187 m (614 ft)
- Lowest elevation: 105 m (344 ft)
- Population (2023): 1,409
  - Density: 171/km^{2} (442/sq mi)
- Time zone: UTC+01:00 (CET)
  - Summer (DST): UTC+02:00 (CEST)
- INSEE/Postal code: 60387 /60690
- ^{1} French Land Register data, which excludes lakes, ponds, glaciers > 1 km^{2} (0.386 sq mi or 247 acres) and river estuaries.

Marseille-en-Beauvaisis (French pronunciation: [maʁsɛj ɑ̃ bovɛzi]; Picard:Marseille-in-Bieuvésis) is a commune in the Oise department in northern France. Marseille-en-Beauvaisis station has rail connections to Beauvais and Le Tréport.

== See also ==
- Communes of the Oise department
