= Feuquières, Oise =

Feuquières
- Commune
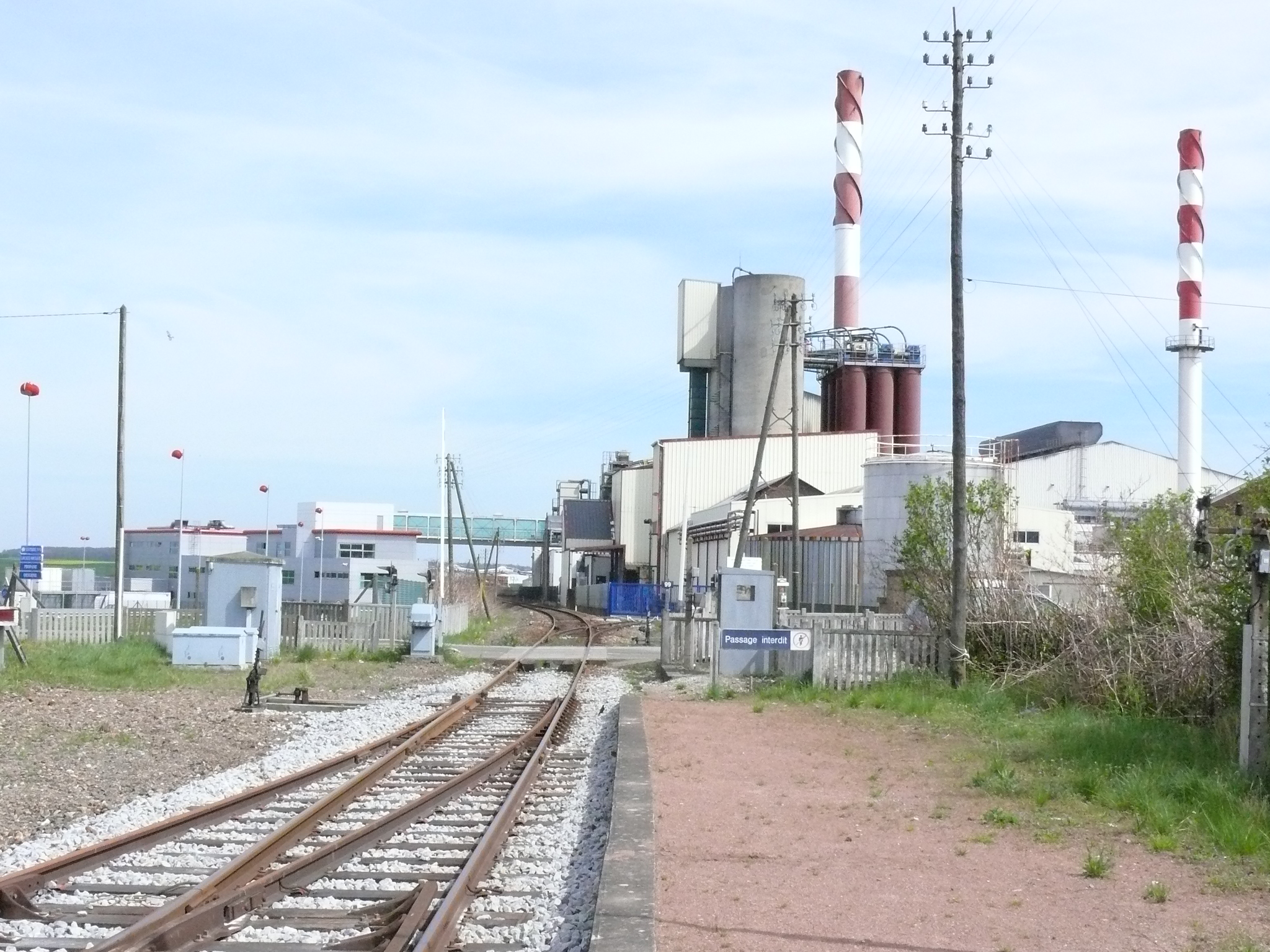
- The Saverglass glassworks in Feuquières
- Location of Feuquières
- Location within France Location within Hauts-de-France
- Coordinates: 49°38′51″N 1°50′51″E
- Country: France
- Region: Hauts-de-France
- Department: Oise
- Arrondissement: Beauvais
- Canton: Grandvilliers
- Intercommunality: Picardie Verte

Government
  - Mayor (2020–2026): Jean-Pierre Estienne
- Area^{1}: 12.24 km^{2} (4.73 sq mi)
- Elevation: 198 m (650 ft)
- Highest elevation: 211 m (692 ft)
- Lowest elevation: 168 m (551 ft)
- Population (2023): 1,437
  - Density: 117.4/km^{2} (304.1/sq mi)
- Time zone: UTC+01:00 (CET)
  - Summer (DST): UTC+02:00 (CEST)
- INSEE/Postal code: 60233 /60960
- ^{1} French Land Register data, which excludes lakes, ponds, glaciers > 1 km^{2} (0.386 sq mi or 247 acres) and river estuaries.

Feuquières (French pronunciation: [føkjɛʁ]) is a commune in the Oise department in northern France. Feuquières-Broquiers station has rail connections to Beauvais and Le Tréport.

== See also ==
- Communes of the Oise department
