= Thérain =

River in France

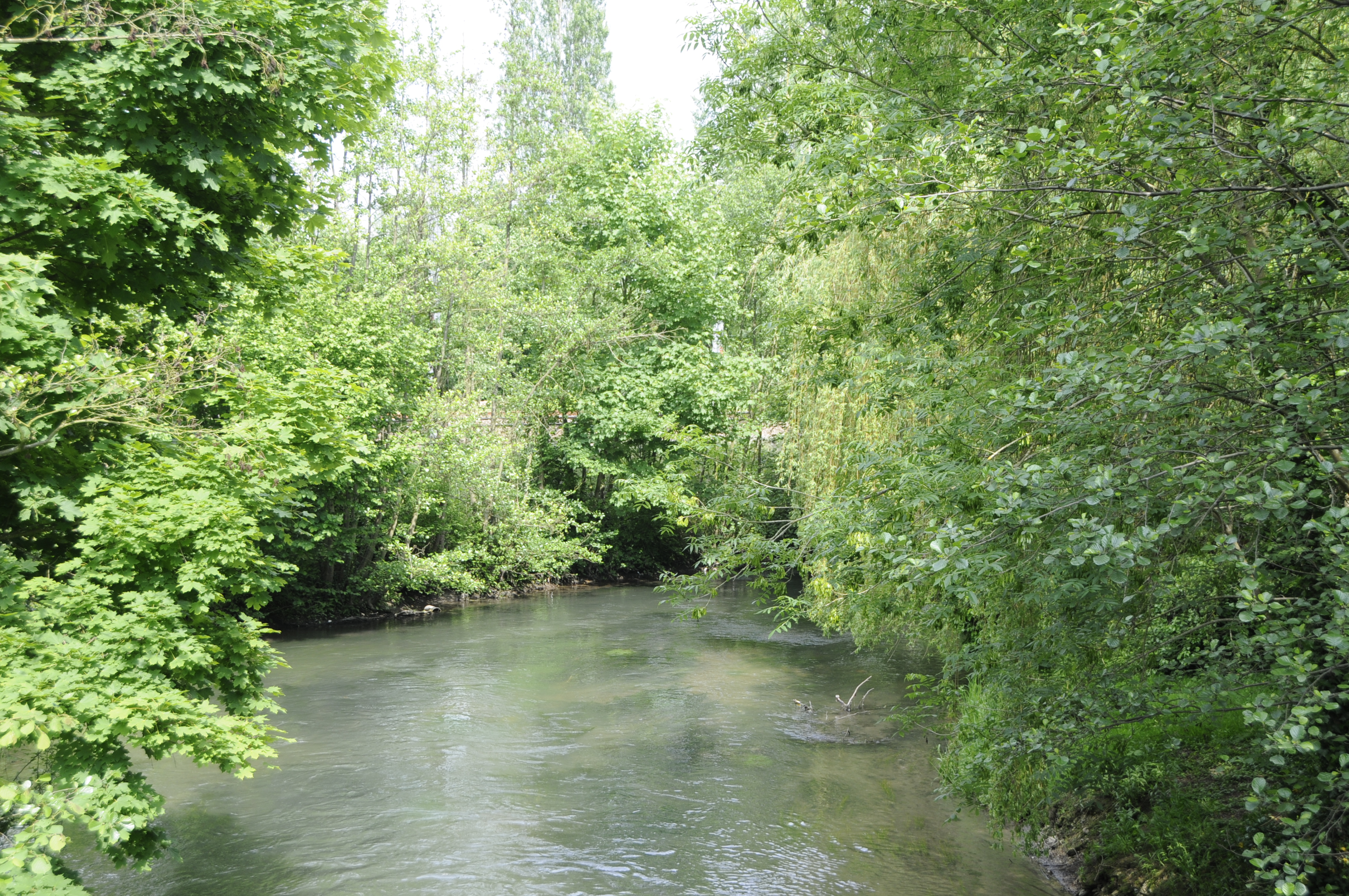

- Location within France Location within Hauts-de-France

Location
- Country: France

Physical characteristics
- Source
  - elevation: 175 m (574 ft)
- Mouth
  - location: Oise
  - coordinates: 49°14′27″N 2°27′1″E
- Length: 94 km (58 mi)

Basin features
- Progression: Oise→ Seine→ English Channel

The Thérain (French pronunciation: [teʁɛ̃]) is a river in France, tributary of the Oise. It is 94.4 km (58.7 mi) long. It rises between Saint-Michel-d'Halescourt and Grumesnil in Seine-Maritime at 175 meters elevation. It flows generally southeast, through Songeons, Milly-sur-Thérain, Beauvais, Hermes and Mouy, and joins the Oise at Creil.

Its valley, near the metropolitan area of Paris, has been a highly industrialized and populated area, and Beauvais lies at the foot of wooded hills on the left bank of the Thérain at its confluence with L' Avelon.

== Affluents ==
- Ruisseau d'Hardouins
- Le Tahier
- Ruisseau de Wambez
- Le Petit Thérain
- L' Avelon
- Rivière de Saint-Quentin
- Rivière de Saint-Just
- La Liovette
- Le Wage
- Ru de Berneuil
- Fosse d'Orgueil
- La Laversines
- La Trye
- Le Sillet
- Ru de la Maladrerie
- Ru de Lombardie
- Le Moineau
- Fossé l' Evêque
- Le Ruisseau de Saint-Claude
- Le Ruisseau de Cires
- Le Ruisseau de Flandre
