= La Hérelle =

- Commune
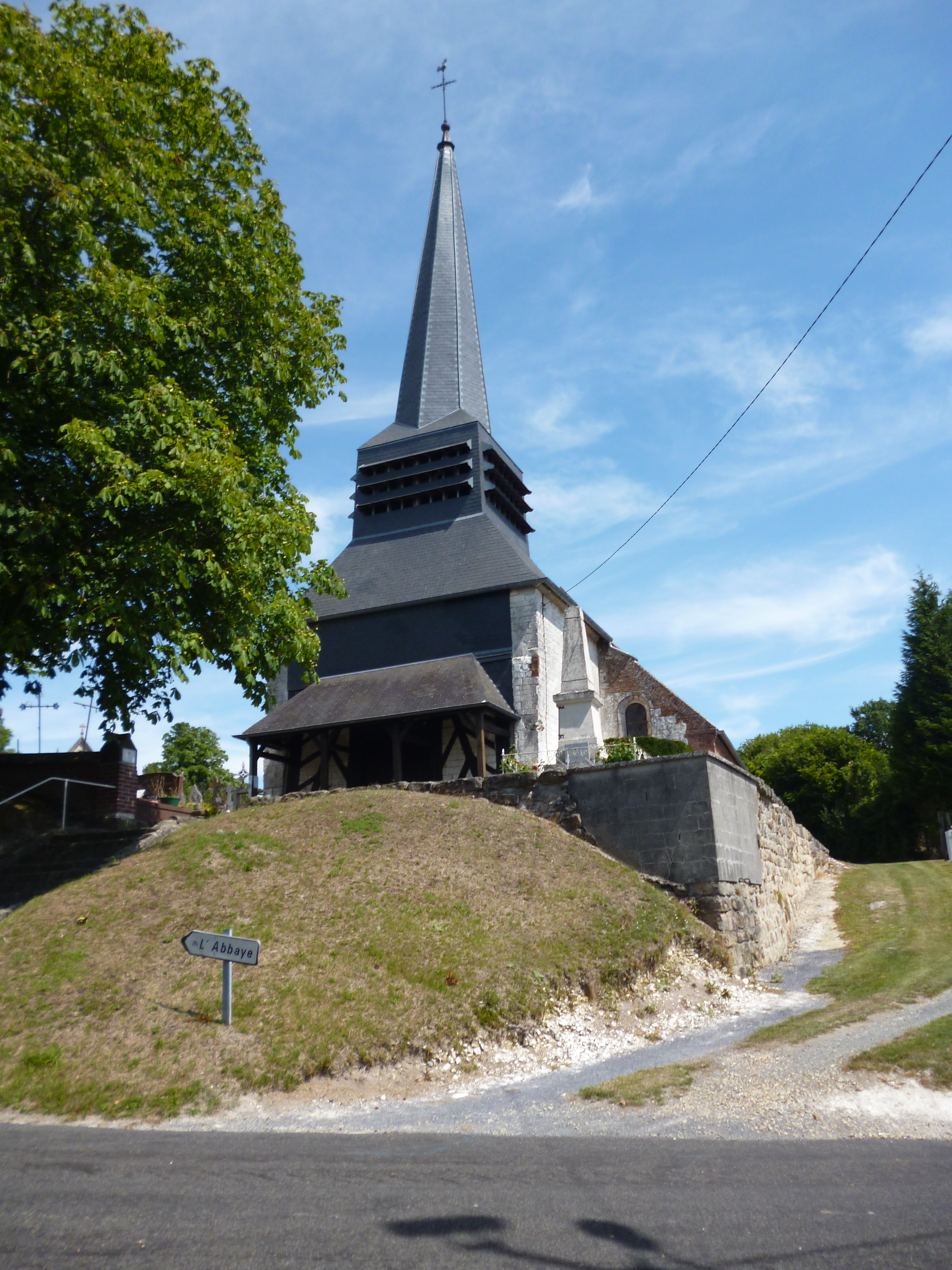
- The church in La Hérelle
- Location of La Hérelle
- Location within France Location within Hauts-de-France
- Coordinates: 49°35′29″N 2°24′56″E
- Country: France
- Region: Hauts-de-France
- Department: Oise
- Arrondissement: Clermont
- Canton: Saint-Just-en-Chaussée

Government
  - Mayor (2020–2026): Simon Callais
- Area^{1}: 5.15 km^{2} (1.99 sq mi)
- Elevation: 132 m (433 ft)
- Highest elevation: 147 m (482 ft)
- Lowest elevation: 99 m (325 ft)
- Population (2023): 237
  - Density: 46.0/km^{2} (119/sq mi)
- Time zone: UTC+01:00 (CET)
  - Summer (DST): UTC+02:00 (CEST)
- INSEE/Postal code: 60311 /60120
- ^{1} French Land Register data, which excludes lakes, ponds, glaciers > 1 km^{2} (0.386 sq mi or 247 acres) and river estuaries.

La Hérelle (French pronunciation: [la eʁɛl]) is a commune in the Oise department in northern France.

== See also ==
- Communes of the Oise department
