= Beauvoir, Oise =

Beauvoir
- Commune
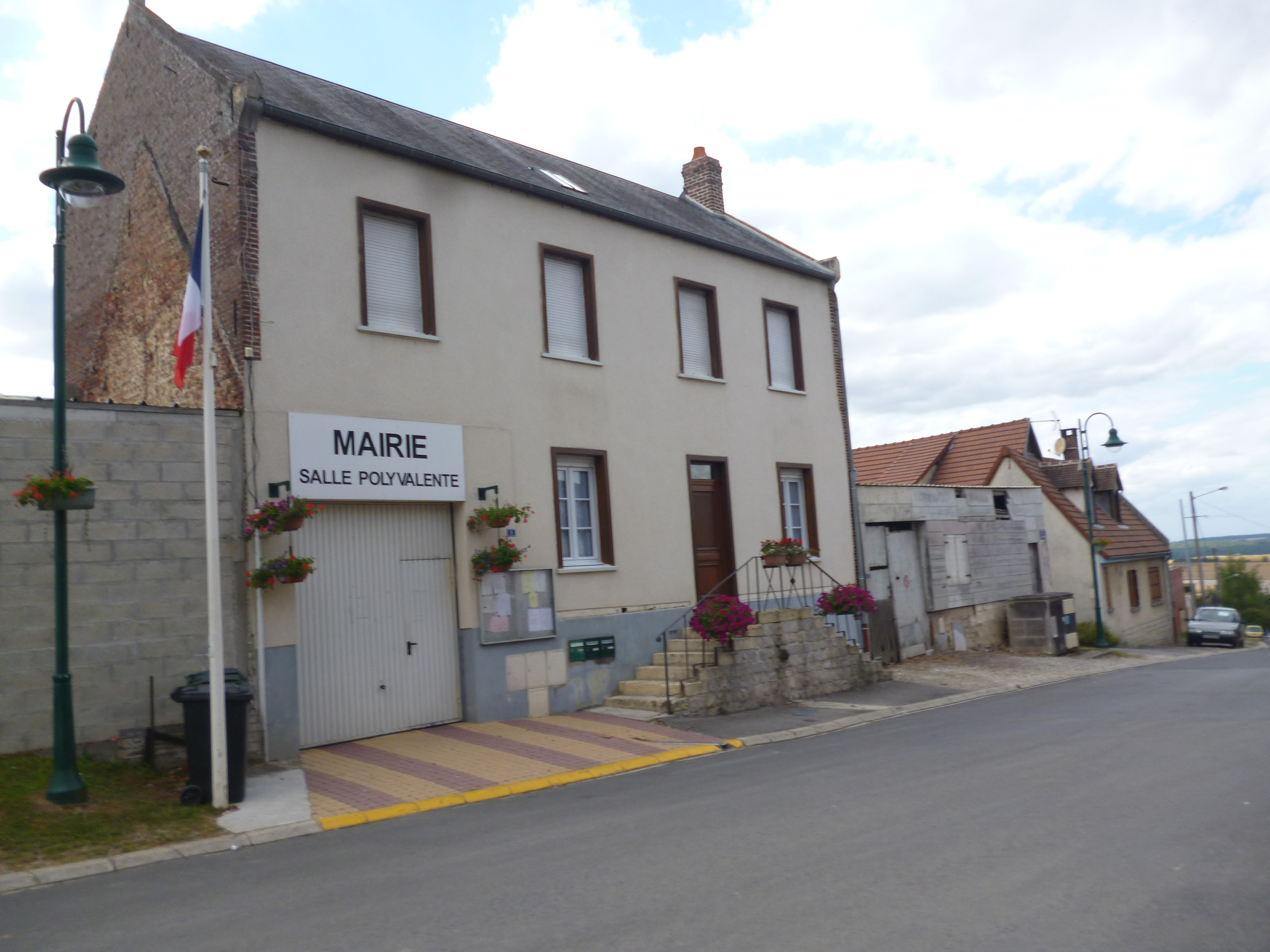
- The town hall in Beauvoir
- Location of Beauvoir
- Location within France Location within Hauts-de-France
- Coordinates: 49°36′13″N 2°19′41″E
- Country: France
- Region: Hauts-de-France
- Department: Oise
- Arrondissement: Clermont
- Canton: Saint-Just-en-Chaussée
- Intercommunality: Oise Picarde

Government
  - Mayor (2020–2026): Laurent Tribout
- Area^{1}: 10.27 km^{2} (3.97 sq mi)
- Elevation: 125 m (410 ft)
- Highest elevation: 165 m (541 ft)
- Lowest elevation: 97 m (318 ft)
- Population (2023): 239
  - Density: 23.3/km^{2} (60.3/sq mi)
- Time zone: UTC+01:00 (CET)
  - Summer (DST): UTC+02:00 (CEST)
- INSEE/Postal code: 60058 /60120
- ^{1} French Land Register data, which excludes lakes, ponds, glaciers > 1 km^{2} (0.386 sq mi or 247 acres) and river estuaries.

Beauvoir (French pronunciation: [bovwaʁ]) is a commune in the Oise department in northern France.

== Population ==
Historical population
Year	Pop.	±% p.a.
1968	217	—
1975	169	−3.51%
1982	172	+0.25%
1990	202	+2.03%
1999	217	+0.80%
2007	277	+3.10%
2012	278	+0.07%
2017	238	−3.06%
2023	239	+0.07%
Source: INSEE

== See also ==
- Communes of the Oise department
