= Noroy =

- Commune
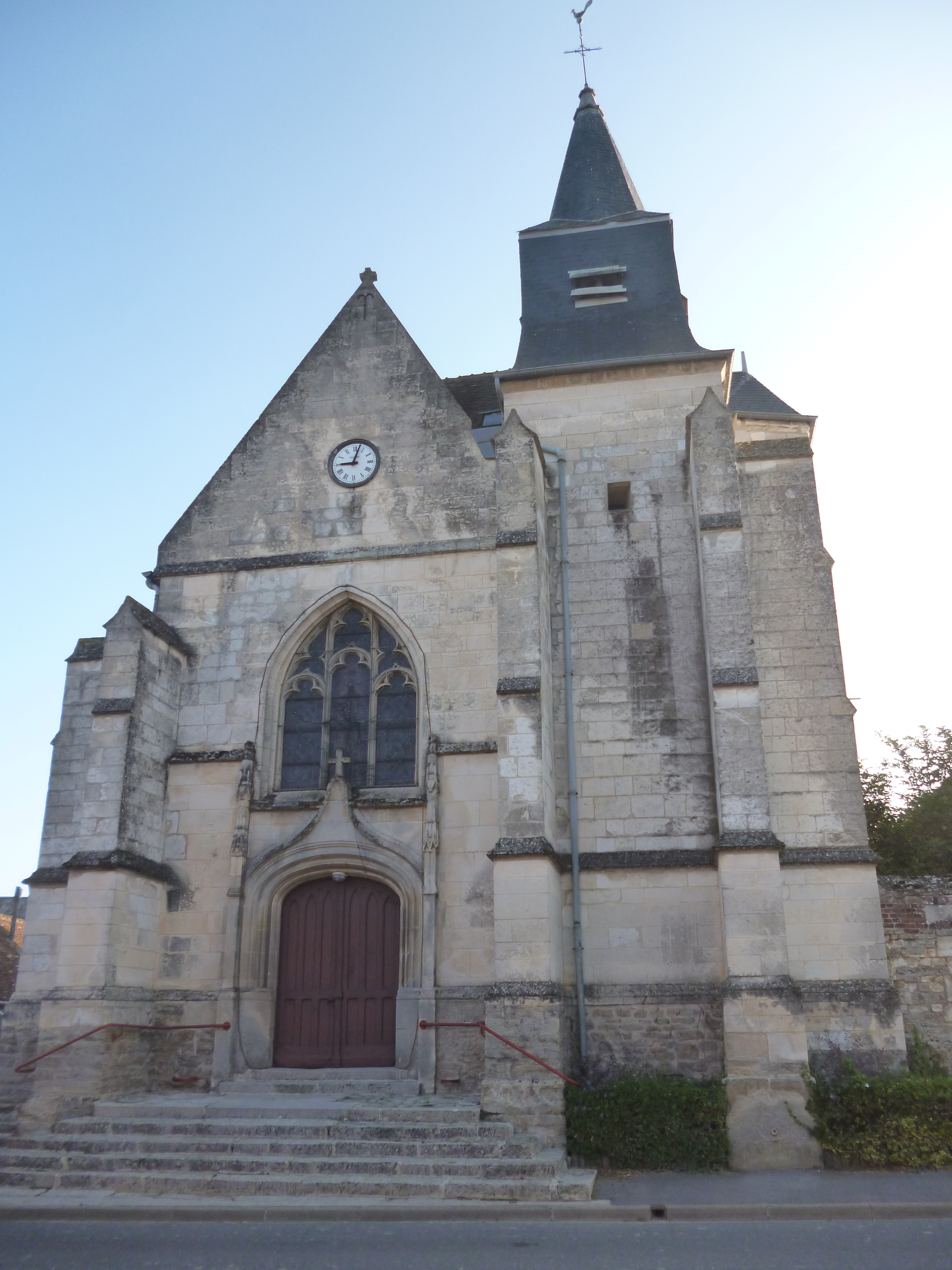
- The church in Noroy
- Location of Noroy
- Location within France Location within Hauts-de-France
- Coordinates: 49°26′57″N 2°30′13″E
- Country: France
- Region: Hauts-de-France
- Department: Oise
- Arrondissement: Clermont
- Canton: Saint-Just-en-Chaussée
- Intercommunality: Plateau Picard

Government
  - Mayor (2023–2026): Stéphanie Benabbas
- Area^{1}: 5.45 km^{2} (2.10 sq mi)
- Elevation: 161 m (528 ft)
- Highest elevation: 159 m (522 ft)
- Lowest elevation: 103 m (338 ft)
- Population (2023): 247
  - Density: 45.3/km^{2} (117/sq mi)
- Time zone: UTC+01:00 (CET)
  - Summer (DST): UTC+02:00 (CEST)
- INSEE/Postal code: 60466 /60130
- ^{1} French Land Register data, which excludes lakes, ponds, glaciers > 1 km^{2} (0.386 sq mi or 247 acres) and river estuaries.

Noroy (French pronunciation: [nɔʁwa]) is a commune in the Oise department in northern France.

== See also ==
- Communes of the Oise department
