= Nourard-le-Franc =

- Commune
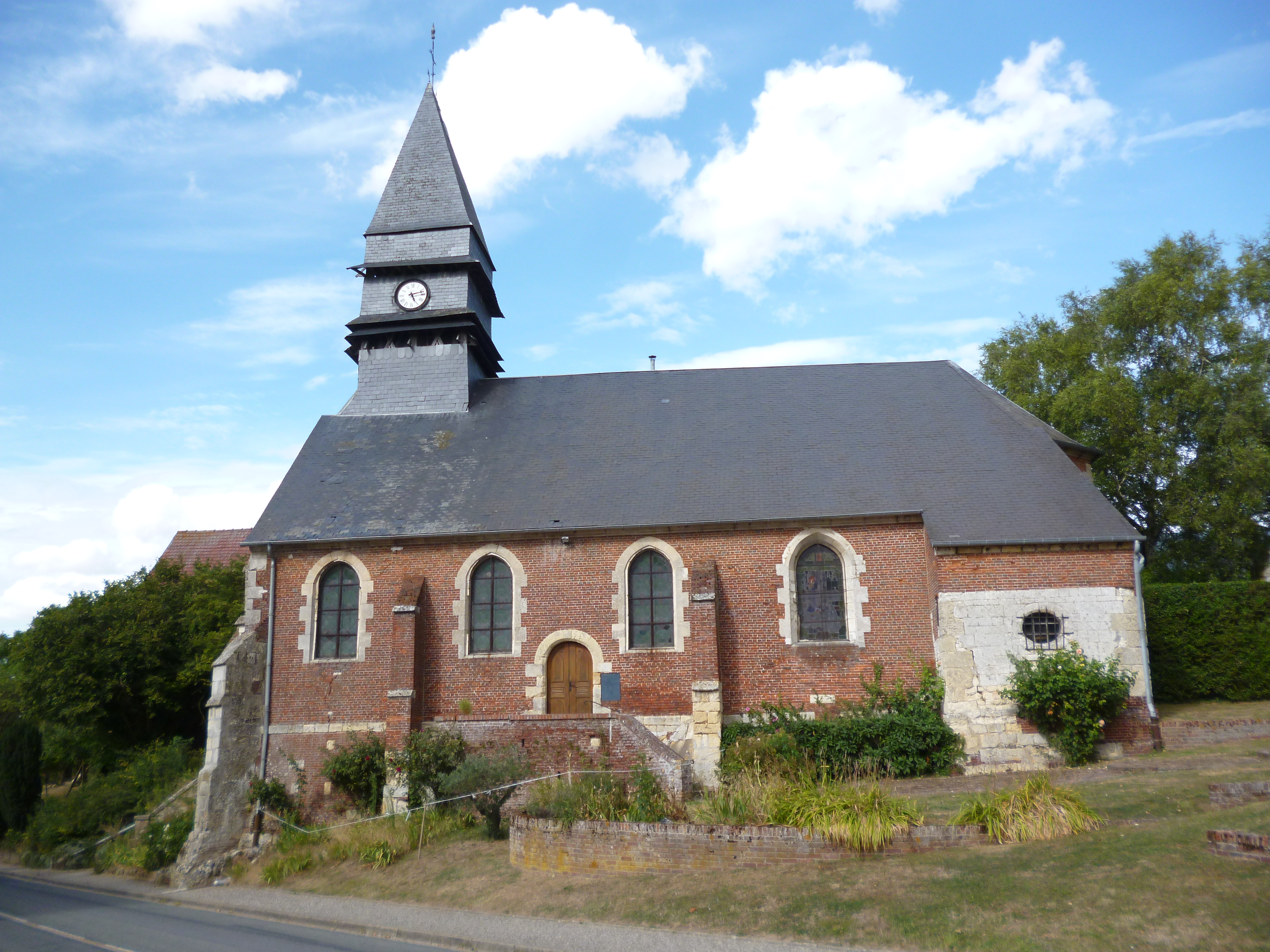
- The church in Nourard-le-Franc
- Location of Nourard-le-Franc
- Location within France Location within Hauts-de-France
- Coordinates: 49°29′58″N 2°22′29″E
- Country: France
- Region: Hauts-de-France
- Department: Oise
- Arrondissement: Clermont
- Canton: Saint-Just-en-Chaussée
- Intercommunality: Plateau Picard

Government
  - Mayor (2020–2026): Sylvie Soudet
- Area^{1}: 11.48 km^{2} (4.43 sq mi)
- Elevation: 168 m (551 ft)
- Highest elevation: 176 m (577 ft)
- Lowest elevation: 109 m (358 ft)
- Population (2023): 301
  - Density: 26.2/km^{2} (67.9/sq mi)
- Time zone: UTC+01:00 (CET)
  - Summer (DST): UTC+02:00 (CEST)
- INSEE/Postal code: 60468 /60130
- ^{1} French Land Register data, which excludes lakes, ponds, glaciers > 1 km^{2} (0.386 sq mi or 247 acres) and river estuaries.

Nourard-le-Franc (French pronunciation: [nuʁaʁ lə fʁɑ̃]) is a commune in the Oise department in northern France.

== See also ==
- Communes of the Oise department
