= Saint-André-Farivillers =

- Commune
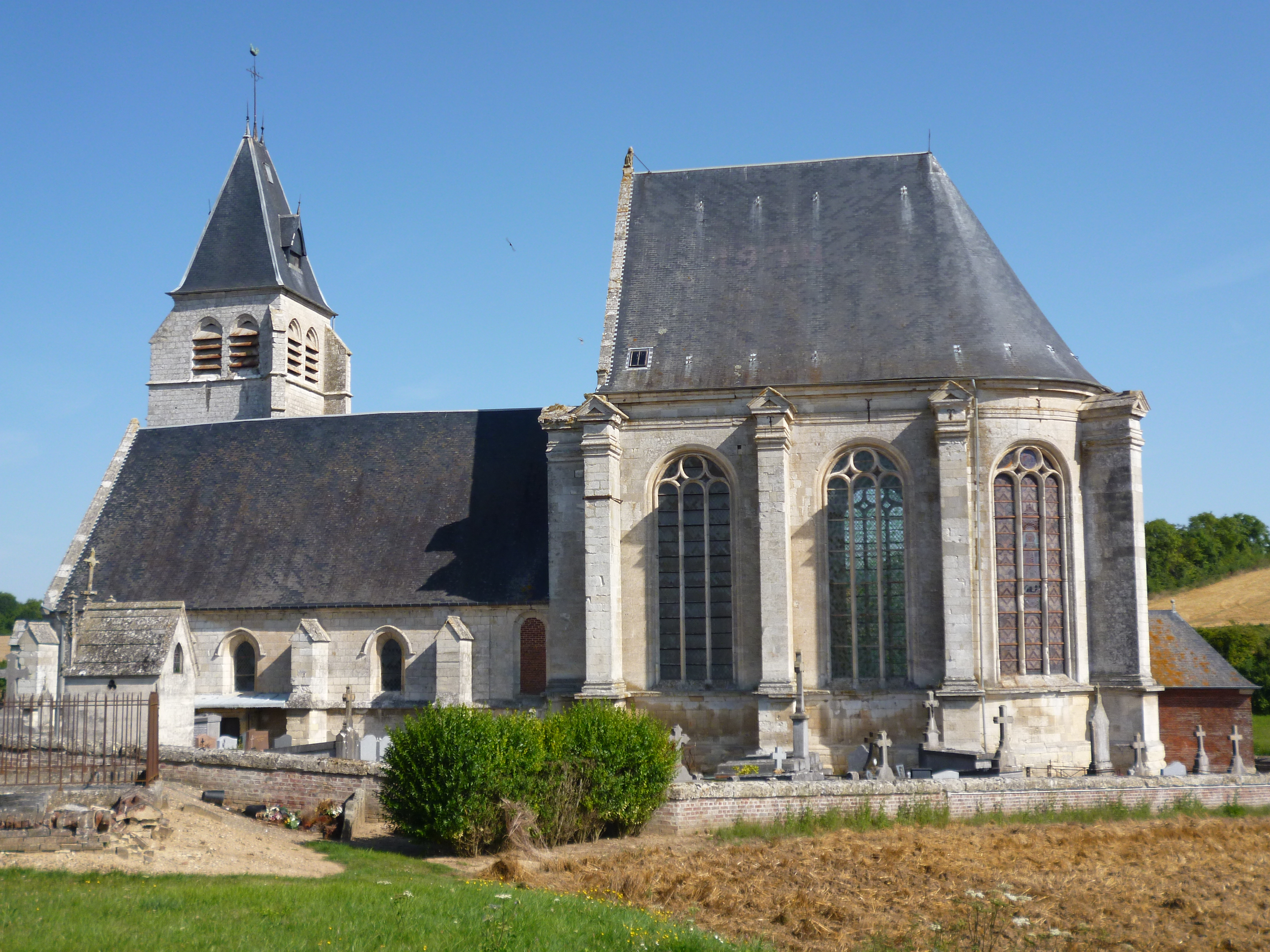
- The church in Saint-André-Farivillers
- Location of Saint-André-Farivillers
- Location within France Location within Hauts-de-France
- Coordinates: 49°35′14″N 2°17′37″E
- Country: France
- Region: Hauts-de-France
- Department: Oise
- Arrondissement: Clermont
- Canton: Saint-Just-en-Chaussée

Government
  - Mayor (2020–2026): Hervé Commelin
- Area^{1}: 11.35 km^{2} (4.38 sq mi)
- Elevation: 100 m (330 ft)
- Highest elevation: 170 m (560 ft)
- Lowest elevation: 88 m (289 ft)
- Population (2023): 514
  - Density: 45.3/km^{2} (117/sq mi)
- Time zone: UTC+01:00 (CET)
  - Summer (DST): UTC+02:00 (CEST)
- INSEE/Postal code: 60565 /60480
- ^{1} French Land Register data, which excludes lakes, ponds, glaciers > 1 km^{2} (0.386 sq mi or 247 acres) and river estuaries.

Saint-André-Farivillers is a commune in the Oise department in northern France.

== Sites and monuments ==
Saint-André Church (16th century) : isolated structure in the middle of the plain, at the junction of four hamlets which constitute the commune. The Renaissance style choir was built in 1555, the Gothic nave is lower. It has been listed since 1992 as a monument historique by the French Ministry of Culture. Three stained glass windows, damaged by a hail storm, were restored in 2016. The church still has a window from 1572, a bell from 1693 and an 18th-century altar.

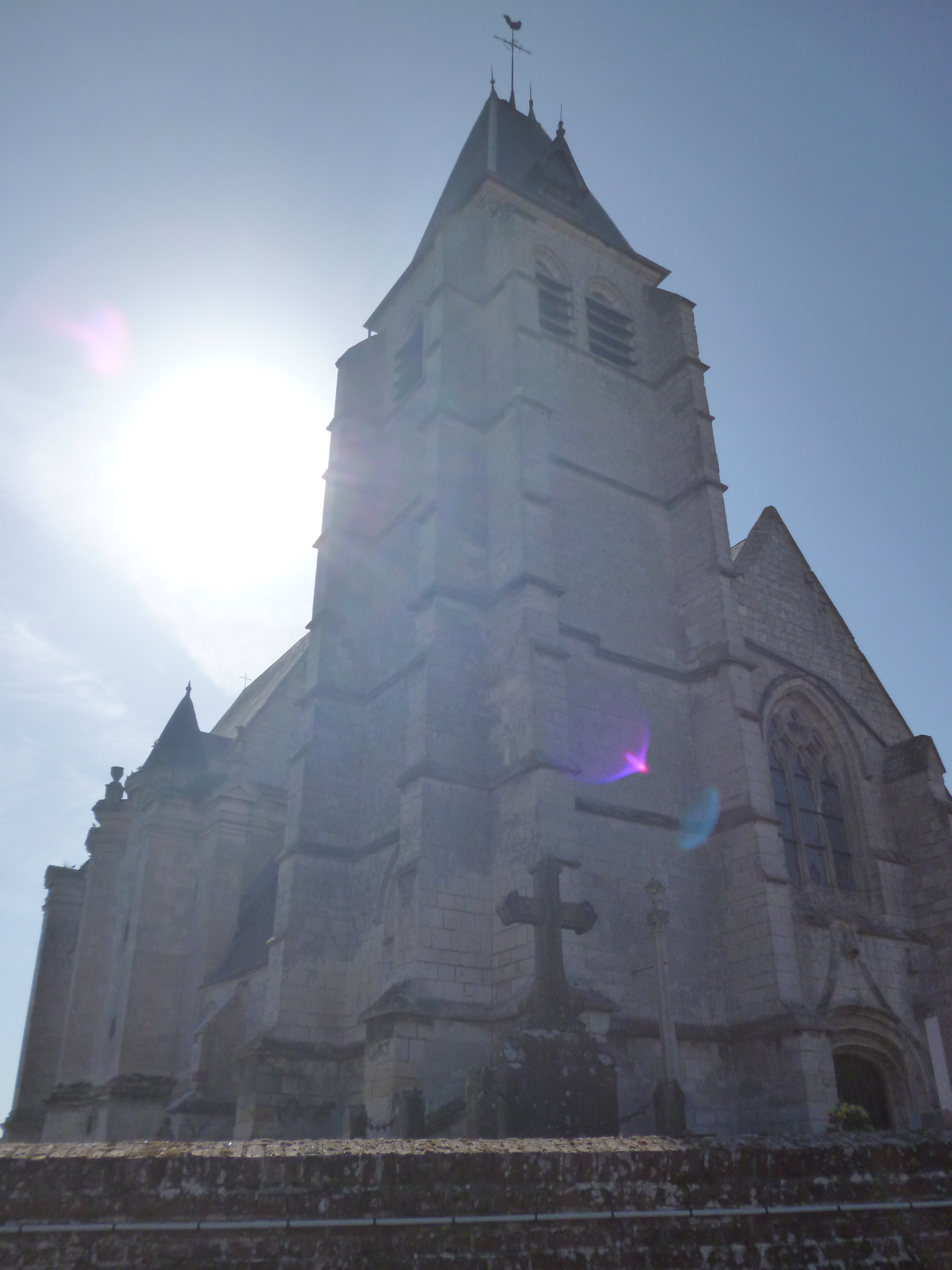
Bell tower

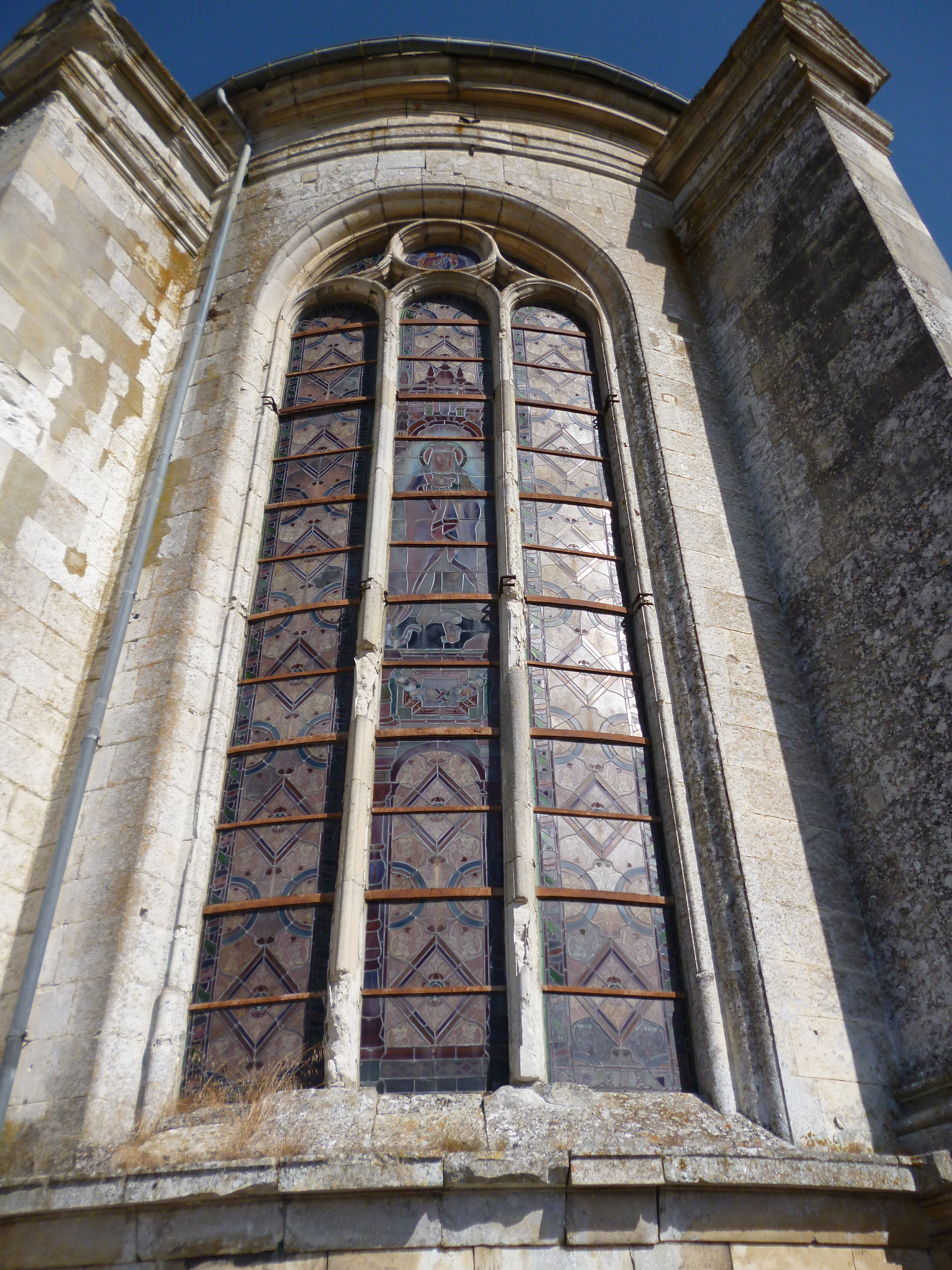
Stained glass window

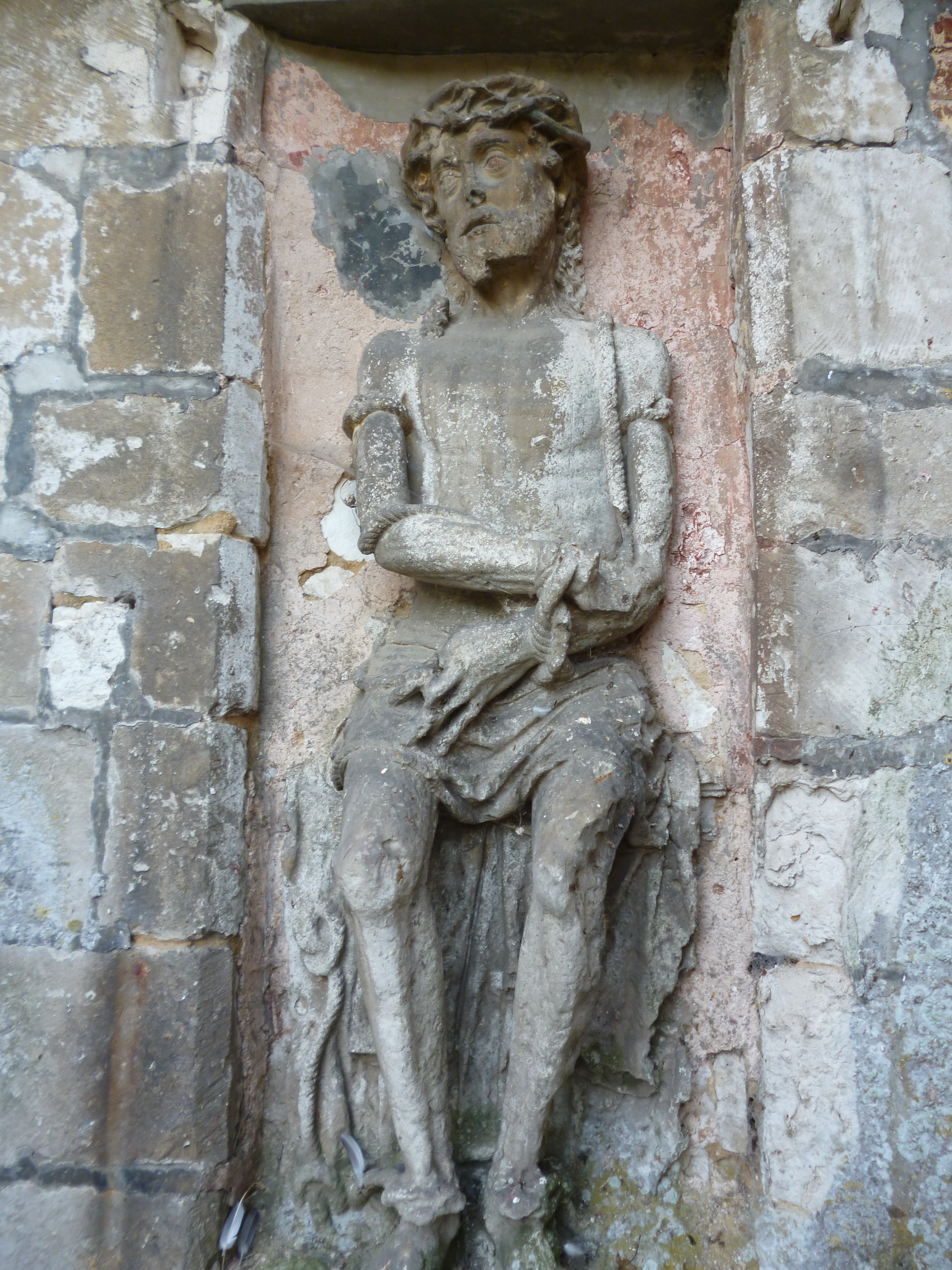
Statue

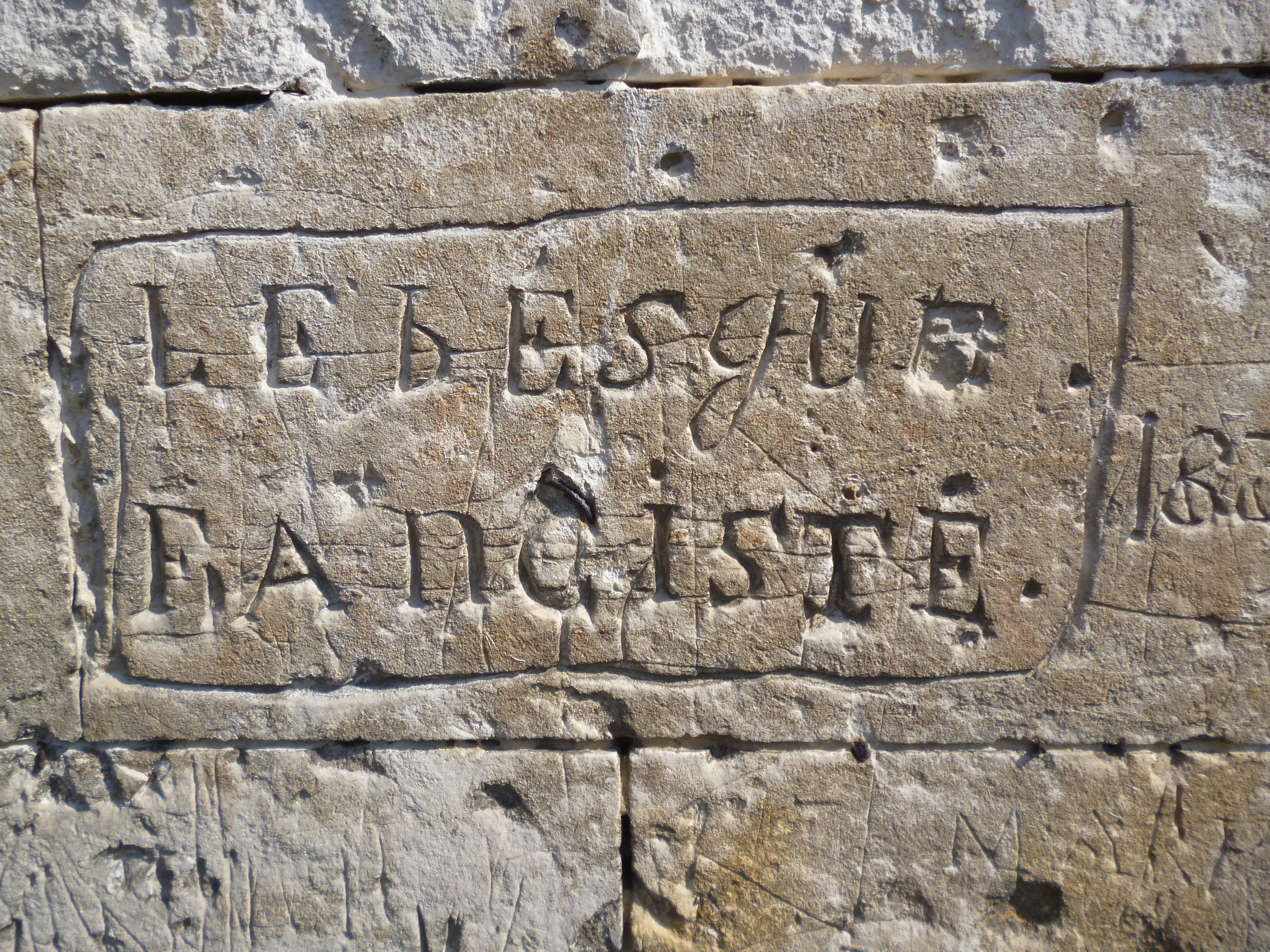
Graffiti example in the church

== See also ==
- Communes of the Oise department
