= Le Crocq =

- Commune
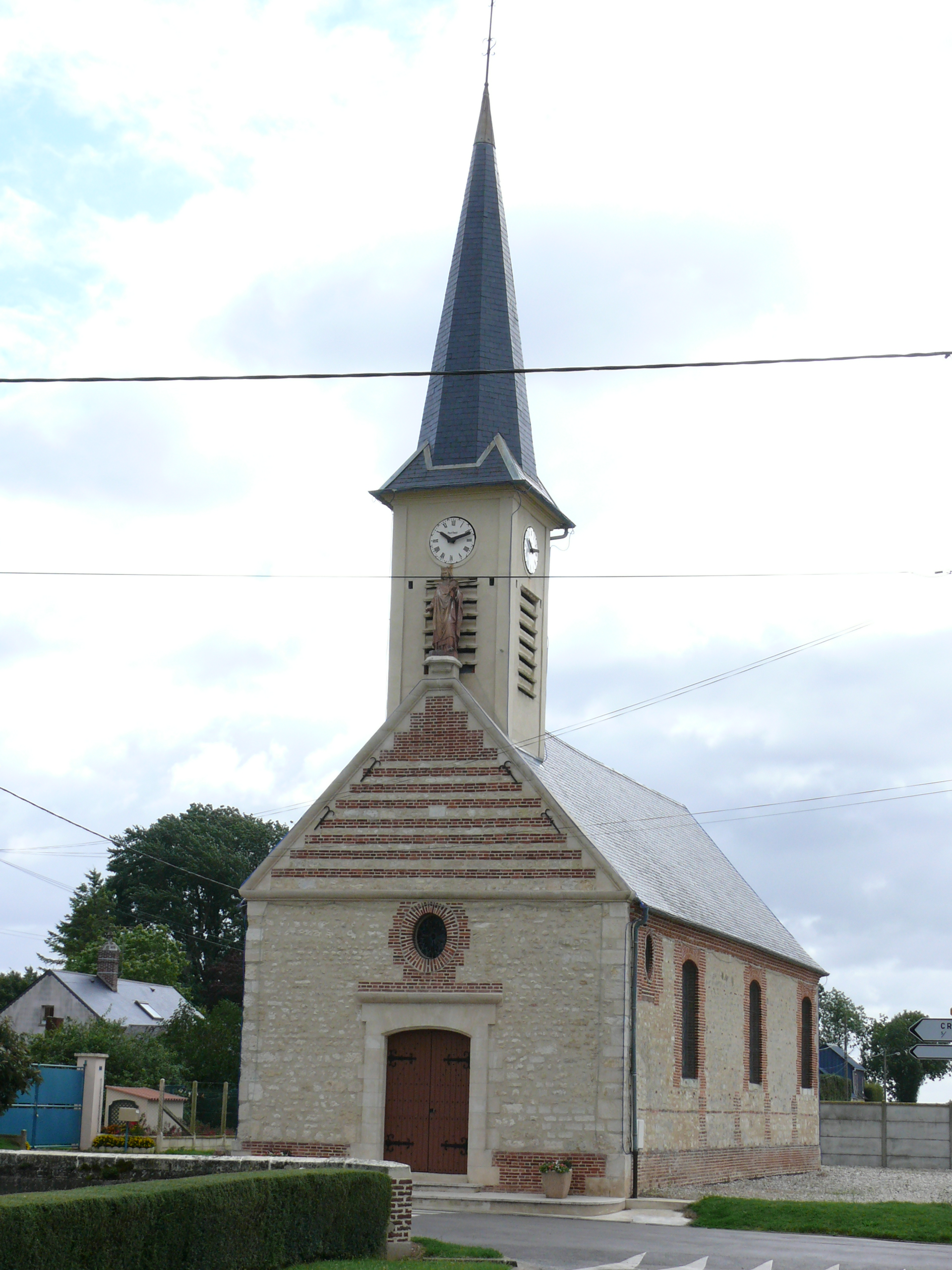
- The church in Le Crocq
- Location of Le Crocq
- Location within France Location within Hauts-de-France
- Coordinates: 49°37′40″N 2°10′50″E
- Country: France
- Region: Hauts-de-France
- Department: Oise
- Arrondissement: Beauvais
- Canton: Saint-Just-en-Chaussée

Government
  - Mayor (2023–2026): Thierry Germe
- Area^{1}: 3.1 km^{2} (1.2 sq mi)
- Elevation: 178 m (584 ft)
- Highest elevation: 187 m (614 ft)
- Lowest elevation: 145 m (476 ft)
- Population (2023): 178
  - Density: 57/km^{2} (150/sq mi)
- Time zone: UTC+01:00 (CET)
  - Summer (DST): UTC+02:00 (CEST)
- INSEE/Postal code: 60182 /60120
- ^{1} French Land Register data, which excludes lakes, ponds, glaciers > 1 km^{2} (0.386 sq mi or 247 acres) and river estuaries.

Le Crocq is a commune in the Oise department in northern France.

== See also ==
- Communes of the Oise department
