= Mory-Montcrux =

- Commune
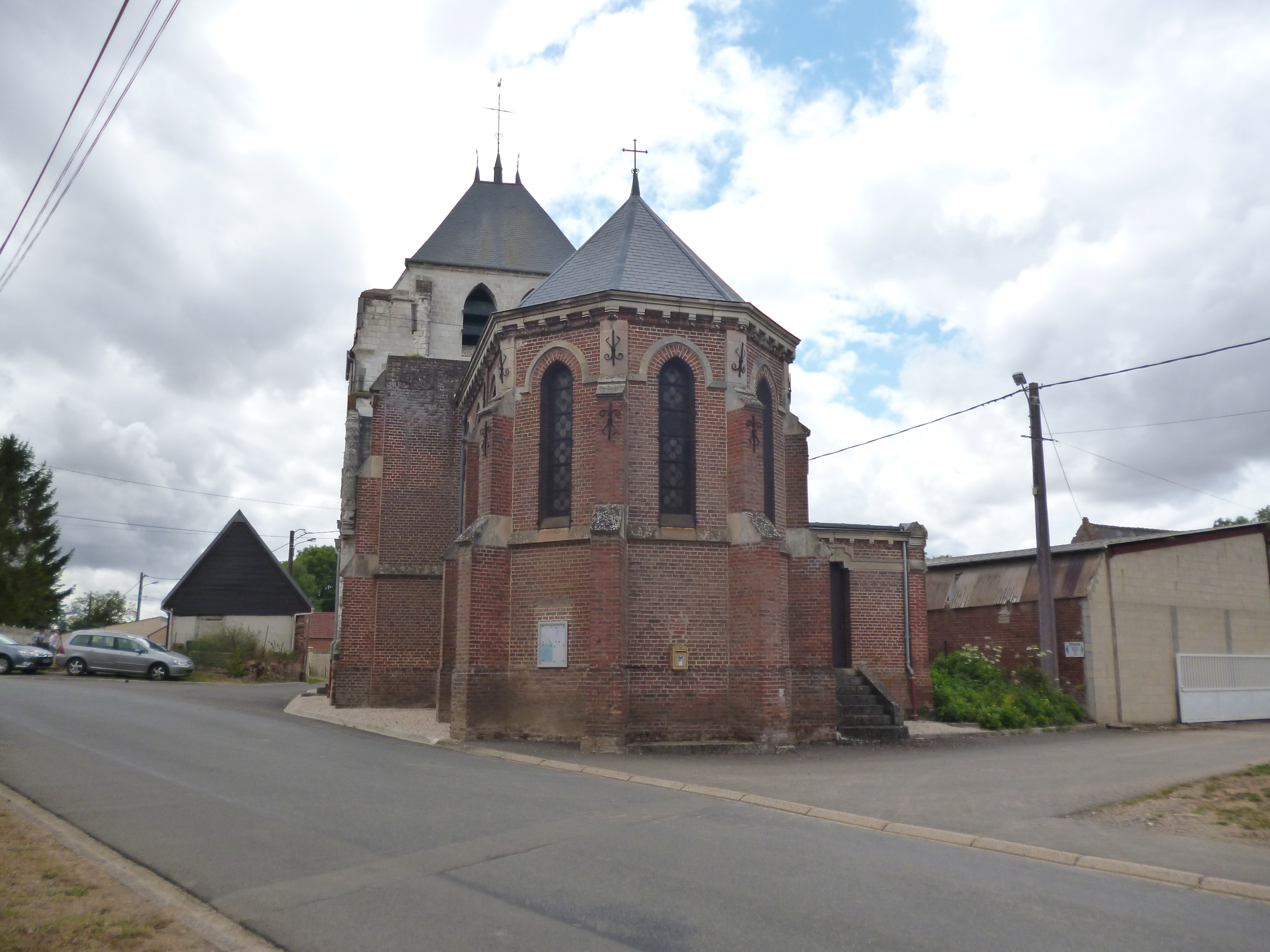
- The church in Mory
- Location of Mory-Montcrux
- Location within France Location within Hauts-de-France
- Coordinates: 49°35′34″N 2°23′43″E
- Country: France
- Region: Hauts-de-France
- Department: Oise
- Arrondissement: Clermont
- Canton: Saint-Just-en-Chaussée

Government
  - Mayor (2020–2026): Renée Gérard
- Area^{1}: 4.66 km^{2} (1.80 sq mi)
- Elevation: 100 m (330 ft)
- Highest elevation: 147 m (482 ft)
- Lowest elevation: 93 m (305 ft)
- Population (2023): 84
  - Density: 18/km^{2} (47/sq mi)
- Time zone: UTC+01:00 (CET)
  - Summer (DST): UTC+02:00 (CEST)
- INSEE/Postal code: 60436 /60120
- ^{1} French Land Register data, which excludes lakes, ponds, glaciers > 1 km^{2} (0.386 sq mi or 247 acres) and river estuaries.

Mory-Montcrux (French pronunciation: [mɔʁi mɔ̃kʁy]) is a commune in the Oise department in northern France.

== See also ==
- Communes of the Oise department
