= Doméliers =

- Commune
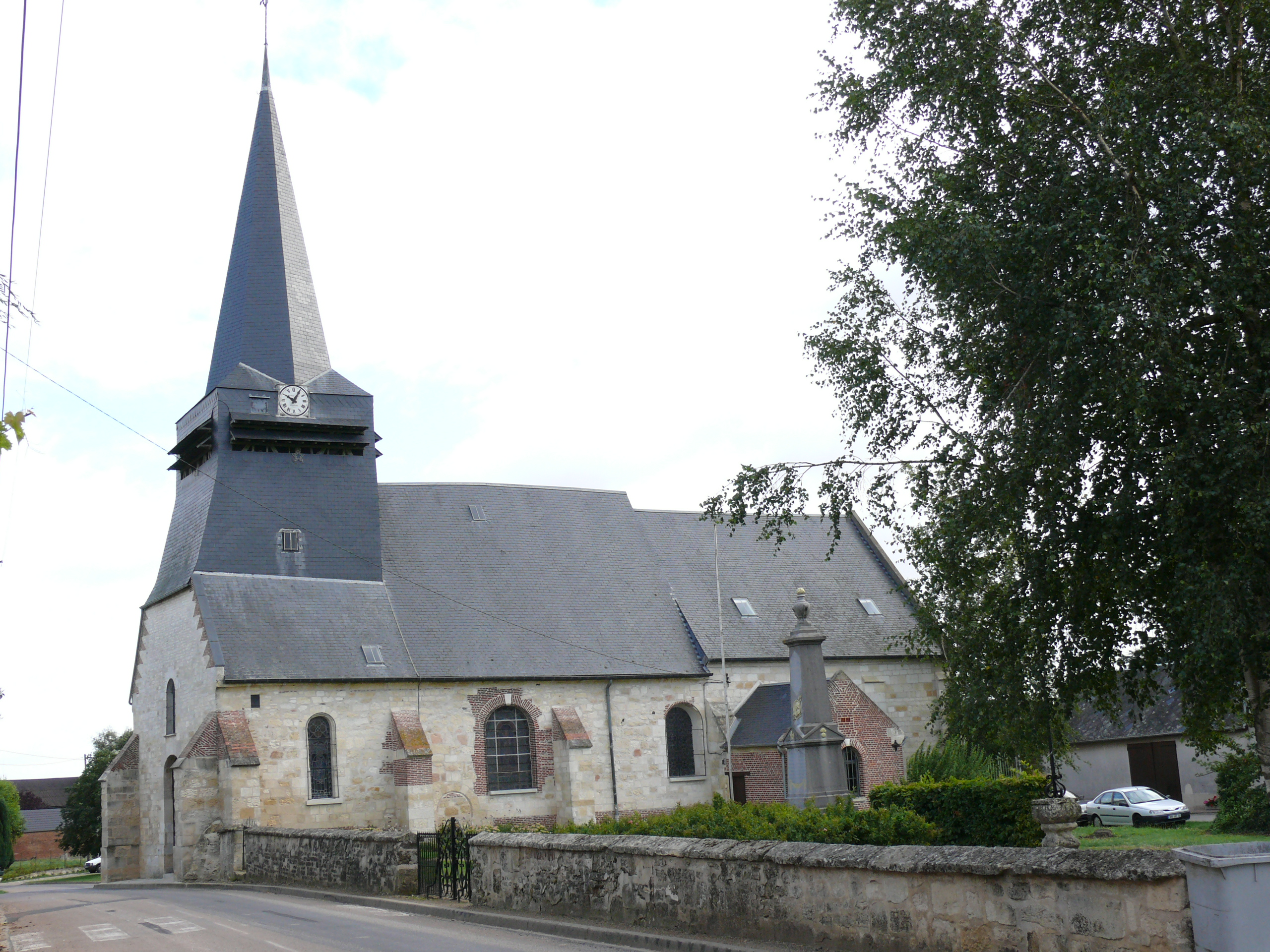
- The church in Doméliers
- Location of Doméliers
- Location within France Location within Hauts-de-France
- Coordinates: 49°38′02″N 2°09′52″E
- Country: France
- Region: Hauts-de-France
- Department: Oise
- Arrondissement: Beauvais
- Canton: Saint-Just-en-Chaussée

Government
  - Mayor (2020–2026): Jean Pupin
- Area^{1}: 6.13 km^{2} (2.37 sq mi)
- Elevation: 180 m (590 ft)
- Highest elevation: 187 m (614 ft)
- Lowest elevation: 114 m (374 ft)
- Population (2023): 250
  - Density: 41/km^{2} (110/sq mi)
- Time zone: UTC+01:00 (CET)
  - Summer (DST): UTC+02:00 (CEST)
- INSEE/Postal code: 60199 /60360
- ^{1} French Land Register data, which excludes lakes, ponds, glaciers > 1 km^{2} (0.386 sq mi or 247 acres) and river estuaries.

Doméliers (French pronunciation: [dɔmelje]) is a commune in the Oise department in northern France.

== See also ==
- Communes of the Oise department
