= Sérévillers =

- Commune
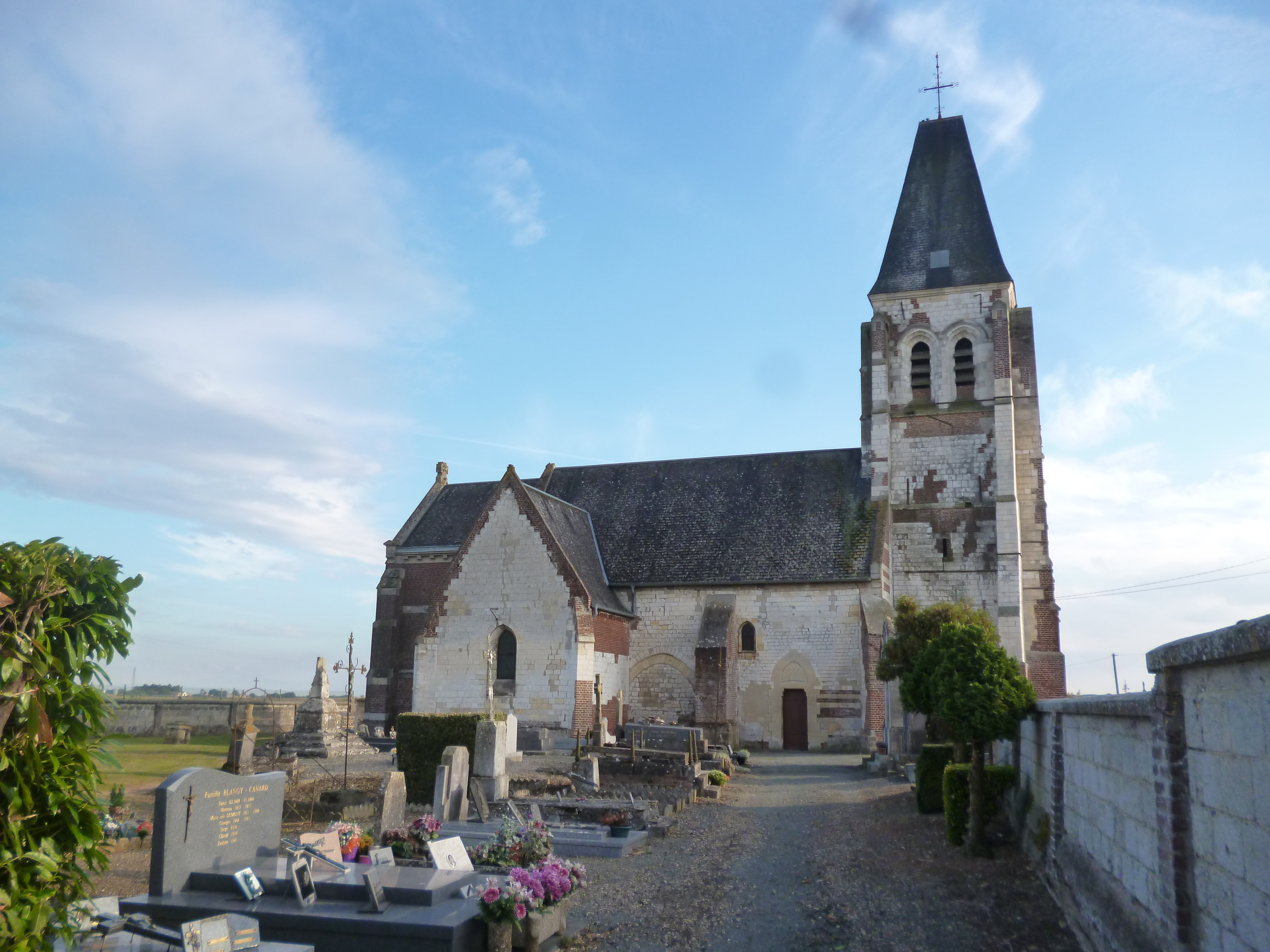
- The church in Sérévillers
- Location of Sérévillers
- Location within France Location within Hauts-de-France
- Coordinates: 49°38′23″N 2°25′52″E
- Country: France
- Region: Hauts-de-France
- Department: Oise
- Arrondissement: Clermont
- Canton: Saint-Just-en-Chaussée

Government
  - Mayor (2020–2026): Vasco Antunes
- Area^{1}: 3.26 km^{2} (1.26 sq mi)
- Elevation: 139 m (456 ft)
- Highest elevation: 145 m (476 ft)
- Lowest elevation: 108 m (354 ft)
- Population (2023): 132
  - Density: 40.5/km^{2} (105/sq mi)
- Time zone: UTC+01:00 (CET)
  - Summer (DST): UTC+02:00 (CEST)
- INSEE/Postal code: 60615 /60120
- ^{1} French Land Register data, which excludes lakes, ponds, glaciers > 1 km^{2} (0.386 sq mi or 247 acres) and river estuaries.

Sérévillers is a commune in the Oise department in northern France.

== See also ==
- Communes of the Oise department
