= Blancfossé =

- Commune
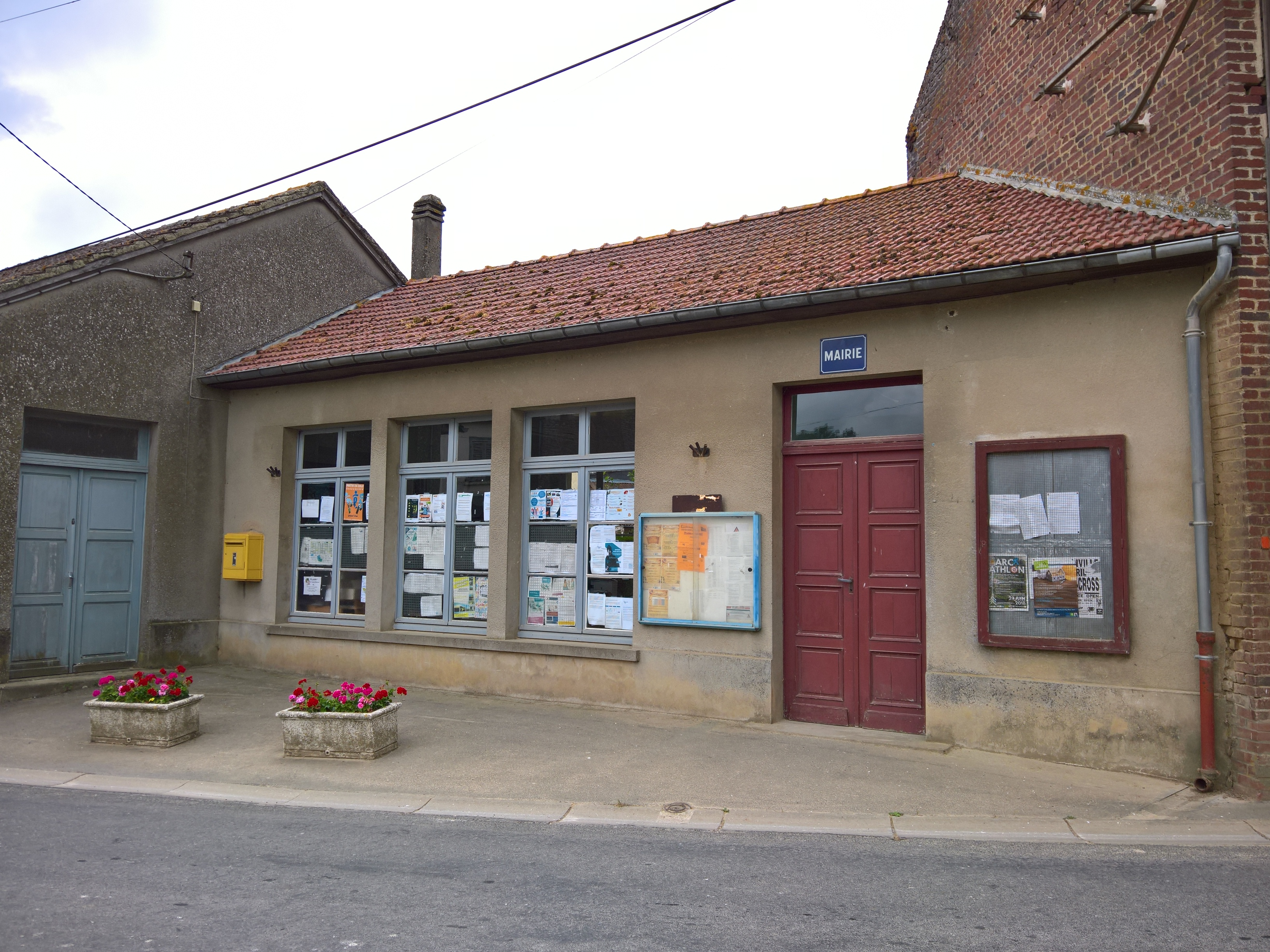
- Blancfossé Town hall
- Location of Blancfossé
- Location within France Location within Hauts-de-France
- Coordinates: 49°39′32″N 2°11′47″E
- Country: France
- Region: Hauts-de-France
- Department: Oise
- Arrondissement: Beauvais
- Canton: Saint-Just-en-Chaussée

Government
  - Mayor (2020–2026): Guillaume Saguez
- Area^{1}: 5.16 km^{2} (1.99 sq mi)
- Elevation: 125 m (410 ft)
- Highest elevation: 172 m (564 ft)
- Lowest elevation: 103 m (338 ft)
- Population (2023): 143
  - Density: 27.7/km^{2} (71.8/sq mi)
- Time zone: UTC+01:00 (CET)
  - Summer (DST): UTC+02:00 (CEST)
- INSEE/Postal code: 60075 /60120
- ^{1} French Land Register data, which excludes lakes, ponds, glaciers > 1 km^{2} (0.386 sq mi or 247 acres) and river estuaries.

Blancfossé (French pronunciation: [blɑ̃fose]) is a commune in the Oise department in northern France.

== Population ==
Historical population
Year	Pop.	±% p.a.
1968	133	—
1975	115	−2.06%
1982	118	+0.37%
1990	91	−3.20%
1999	119	+3.03%
2007	134	+1.50%
2012	129	−0.76%
2017	146	+2.51%
2023	143	−0.35%
Source: INSEE

== See also ==
- Communes of the Oise department
