= Viefvillers =

- Commune
- Coat of arms
- Location of Viefvillers
- Location within France Location within Hauts-de-France
- Coordinates: 49°36′51″N 2°07′48″E
- Country: France
- Region: Hauts-de-France
- Department: Oise
- Arrondissement: Beauvais
- Canton: Saint-Just-en-Chaussée

Government
  - Mayor (2021–2026): André Lippens
- Area^{1}: 4.09 km^{2} (1.58 sq mi)
- Elevation: 170 m (560 ft)
- Highest elevation: 182 m (597 ft)
- Lowest elevation: 149 m (489 ft)
- Population (2023): 211
  - Density: 51.6/km^{2} (134/sq mi)
- Time zone: UTC+01:00 (CET)
  - Summer (DST): UTC+02:00 (CEST)
- INSEE/Postal code: 60673 /60360
- ^{1} French Land Register data, which excludes lakes, ponds, glaciers > 1 km^{2} (0.386 sq mi or 247 acres) and river estuaries.

Viefvillers is a commune in the Oise department in northern France.

== See also ==
- Communes of the Oise department
