= Troussencourt =

- Commune
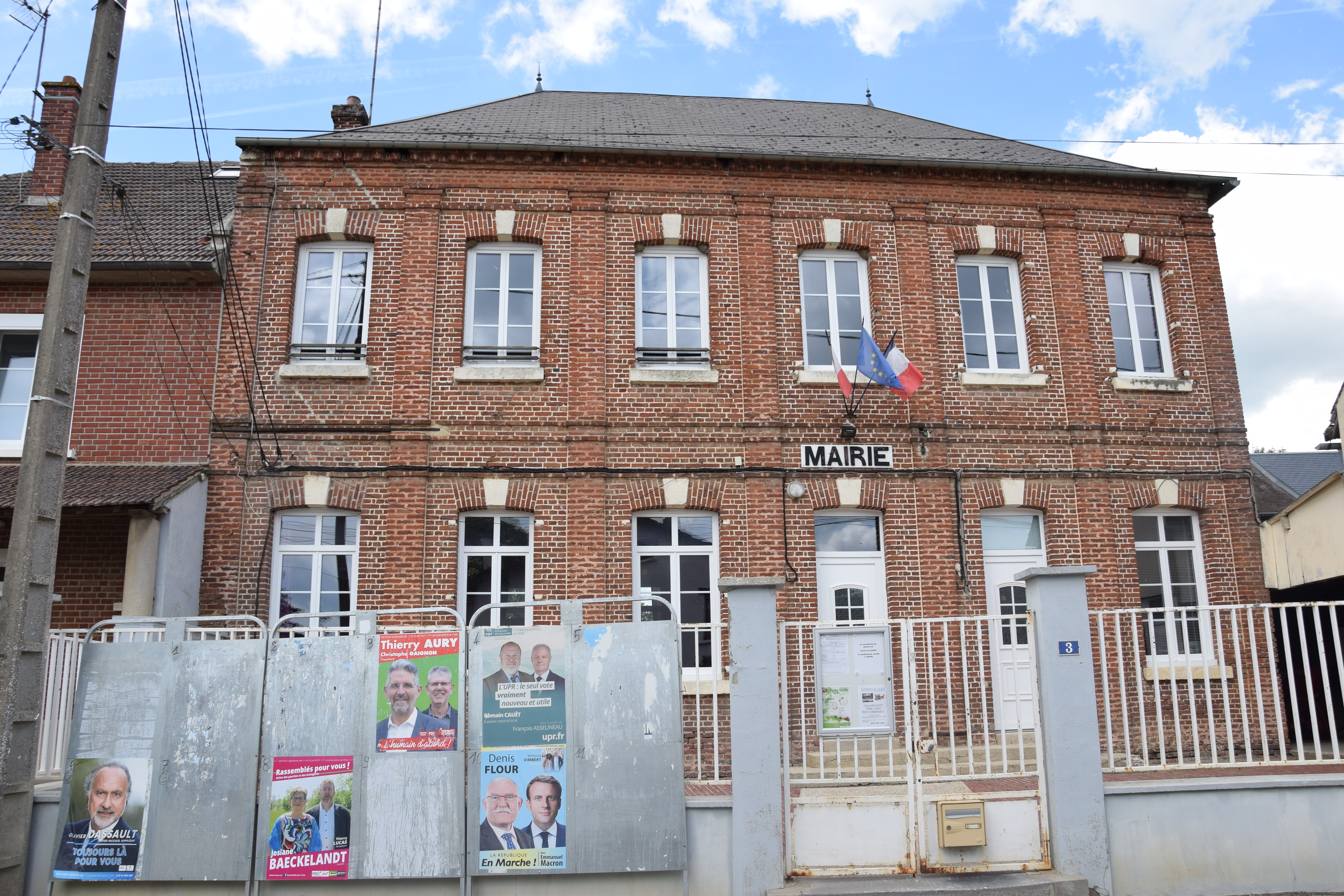
- The town hall in Troussencourt
- Location of Troussencourt
- Location within France Location within Hauts-de-France
- Coordinates: 49°36′28″N 2°15′18″E
- Country: France
- Region: Hauts-de-France
- Department: Oise
- Arrondissement: Clermont
- Canton: Saint-Just-en-Chaussée

Government
  - Mayor (2020–2026): Jean-Pierre Postel
- Area^{1}: 5.33 km^{2} (2.06 sq mi)
- Elevation: 100 m (330 ft)
- Highest elevation: 173 m (568 ft)
- Lowest elevation: 94 m (308 ft)
- Population (2023): 314
  - Density: 58.9/km^{2} (153/sq mi)
- Time zone: UTC+01:00 (CET)
  - Summer (DST): UTC+02:00 (CEST)
- INSEE/Postal code: 60648 /60120
- ^{1} French Land Register data, which excludes lakes, ponds, glaciers > 1 km^{2} (0.386 sq mi or 247 acres) and river estuaries.

Troussencourt (French pronunciation: [tʁusɑ̃kuʁ]) is a commune in the Oise department in northern France.

== Demography ==
Historical population
| Year | Pop. | ±% p.a. |
|---|---|---|
| 1968 | 253 | — |
| 1975 | 217 | −2.17% |
| 1982 | 224 | +0.45% |
| 1990 | 237 | +0.71% |
| 1999 | 282 | +1.95% |
| 2007 | 332 | +2.06% |
| 2012 | 351 | +1.12% |
| 2017 | 332 | −1.11% |
| 2023 | 314 | −0.92% |
Source: INSEE

== See also ==
- Communes of the Oise department
