= Catheux =

- Commune
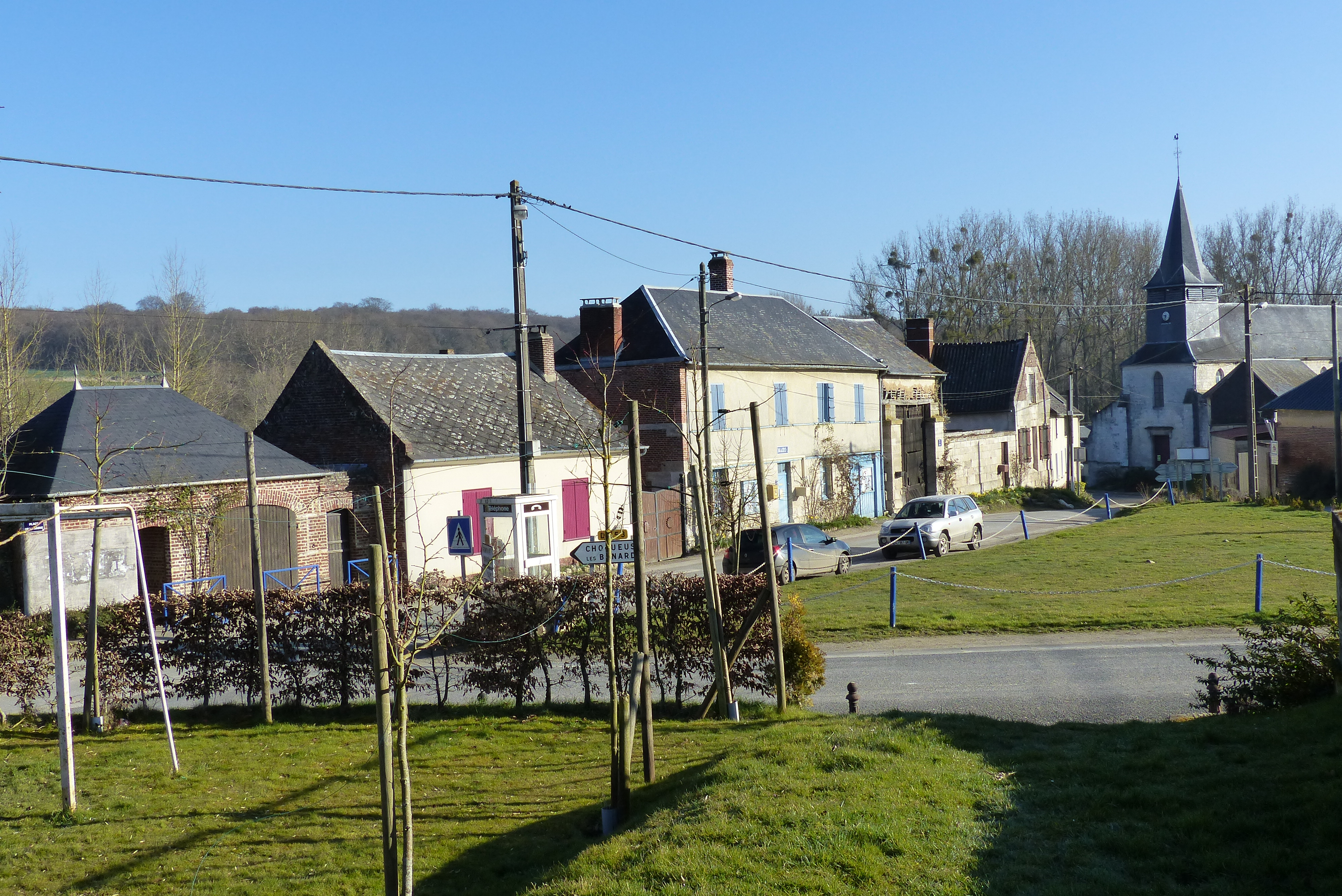
- The town hall and church in Catheux
- Location of Catheux
- Location within France Location within Hauts-de-France
- Coordinates: 49°39′12″N 2°07′18″E
- Country: France
- Region: Hauts-de-France
- Department: Oise
- Arrondissement: Beauvais
- Canton: Saint-Just-en-Chaussée

Government
  - Mayor (2020–2026): Éric Tribout
- Area^{1}: 11.78 km^{2} (4.55 sq mi)
- Elevation: 103 m (338 ft)
- Highest elevation: 177 m (581 ft)
- Lowest elevation: 87 m (285 ft)
- Population (2023): 100
  - Density: 8.5/km^{2} (22/sq mi)
- Time zone: UTC+01:00 (CET)
  - Summer (DST): UTC+02:00 (CEST)
- INSEE/Postal code: 60131 /60360
- ^{1} French Land Register data, which excludes lakes, ponds, glaciers > 1 km^{2} (0.386 sq mi or 247 acres) and river estuaries.

Catheux (French pronunciation: [katø]) is a commune in the Oise department in northern France.

== See also ==
- Communes of the Oise department
