= Maisoncelle-Tuilerie =

- Commune
- Location of Maisoncelle-Tuilerie
- Location within France Location within Hauts-de-France
- Coordinates: 49°35′23″N 2°13′15″E
- Country: France
- Region: Hauts-de-France
- Department: Oise
- Arrondissement: Clermont
- Canton: Saint-Just-en-Chaussée

Government
  - Mayor (2020–2026): Gérard Levoir
- Area^{1}: 7.72 km^{2} (2.98 sq mi)
- Elevation: 160 m (520 ft)
- Highest elevation: 188 m (617 ft)
- Lowest elevation: 110 m (360 ft)
- Population (2023): 285
  - Density: 36.9/km^{2} (95.6/sq mi)
- Time zone: UTC+01:00 (CET)
  - Summer (DST): UTC+02:00 (CEST)
- INSEE/Postal code: 60377 /60480
- ^{1} French Land Register data, which excludes lakes, ponds, glaciers > 1 km^{2} (0.386 sq mi or 247 acres) and river estuaries.

Maisoncelle-Tuilerie (French pronunciation: [mɛzɔ̃sɛl tɥilʁi]) is a commune in the Oise department in northern France.

== See also ==
- Communes of the Oise department
