= Catillon-Fumechon =

- Commune
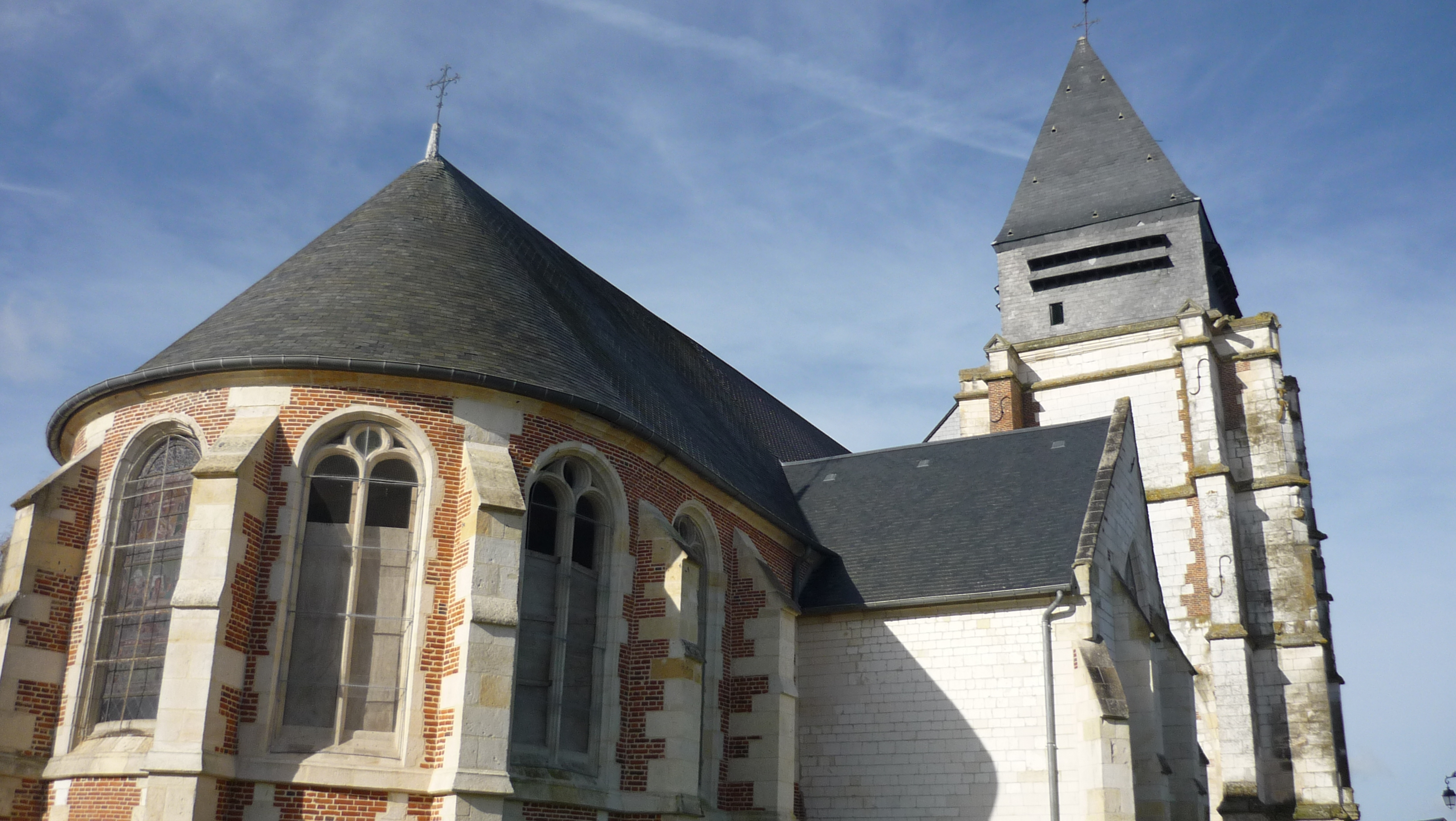
- The church in Catillon
- Location of Catillon-Fumechon
- Location within France Location within Hauts-de-France
- Coordinates: 49°31′05″N 2°22′14″E
- Country: France
- Region: Hauts-de-France
- Department: Oise
- Arrondissement: Clermont
- Canton: Saint-Just-en-Chaussée
- Intercommunality: Plateau Picard

Government
  - Mayor (2020–2026): Didier Dupont
- Area^{1}: 13.31 km^{2} (5.14 sq mi)
- Elevation: 129 m (423 ft)
- Highest elevation: 177 m (581 ft)
- Lowest elevation: 108 m (354 ft)
- Population (2023): 542
  - Density: 40.7/km^{2} (105/sq mi)
- Time zone: UTC+01:00 (CET)
  - Summer (DST): UTC+02:00 (CEST)
- INSEE/Postal code: 60133 /60130
- ^{1} French Land Register data, which excludes lakes, ponds, glaciers > 1 km^{2} (0.386 sq mi or 247 acres) and river estuaries.

Catillon-Fumechon (French pronunciation: [katijɔ̃ fymʃɔ̃]) is a commune in the Oise department in northern France.

== See also ==
- Communes of the Oise department
