= Noirémont =

- Commune
- Location of Noirémont
- Location within France Location within Hauts-de-France
- Coordinates: 49°33′04″N 2°12′45″E
- Country: France
- Region: Hauts-de-France
- Department: Oise
- Arrondissement: Clermont
- Canton: Saint-Just-en-Chaussée
- Intercommunality: Oise Picarde

Government
  - Mayor (2020–2026): Philippe Jacquier
- Area^{1}: 6.37 km^{2} (2.46 sq mi)
- Elevation: 172 m (564 ft)
- Highest elevation: 164 m (538 ft)
- Lowest elevation: 119 m (390 ft)
- Population (2023): 194
  - Density: 30.5/km^{2} (78.9/sq mi)
- Time zone: UTC+01:00 (CET)
  - Summer (DST): UTC+02:00 (CEST)
- INSEE/Postal code: 60465 /60480
- ^{1} French Land Register data, which excludes lakes, ponds, glaciers > 1 km^{2} (0.386 sq mi or 247 acres) and river estuaries.

Noirémont (French pronunciation: [nwaʁemɔ̃]) is a commune in the Oise department in northern France.

== See also ==
- Communes of the Oise department
