= Puits-la-Vallée =

- Commune
- Location of Puits-la-Vallée
- Location within France Location within Hauts-de-France
- Coordinates: 49°34′59″N 2°11′37″E
- Country: France
- Region: Hauts-de-France
- Department: Oise
- Arrondissement: Clermont
- Canton: Saint-Just-en-Chaussée

Government
  - Mayor (2020–2026): Dominique Gaudefroy
- Area^{1}: 4.31 km^{2} (1.66 sq mi)
- Elevation: 157 m (515 ft)
- Highest elevation: 183 m (600 ft)
- Lowest elevation: 128 m (420 ft)
- Population (2023): 203
  - Density: 47.1/km^{2} (122/sq mi)
- Time zone: UTC+01:00 (CET)
  - Summer (DST): UTC+02:00 (CEST)
- INSEE/Postal code: 60518 /60480
- ^{1} French Land Register data, which excludes lakes, ponds, glaciers > 1 km^{2} (0.386 sq mi or 247 acres) and river estuaries.

Puits-la-Vallée (French pronunciation: [pɥi la vale]) is a commune in the Oise department in northern France.

== See also ==
- Communes of the Oise department
