= La Neuville-Saint-Pierre =

- Commune
- Location of La Neuville-Saint-Pierre
- Location within France Location within Hauts-de-France
- Coordinates: 49°31′44″N 2°12′19″E
- Country: France
- Region: Hauts-de-France
- Department: Oise
- Arrondissement: Clermont
- Canton: Saint-Just-en-Chaussée

Government
  - Mayor (2020–2026): Jean-Pierre Nigro
- Area^{1}: 4.11 km^{2} (1.59 sq mi)
- Elevation: 150 m (490 ft)
- Highest elevation: 155 m (509 ft)
- Lowest elevation: 115 m (377 ft)
- Population (2023): 162
  - Density: 39.4/km^{2} (102/sq mi)
- Time zone: UTC+01:00 (CET)
  - Summer (DST): UTC+02:00 (CEST)
- INSEE/Postal code: 60457 /60480
- ^{1} French Land Register data, which excludes lakes, ponds, glaciers > 1 km^{2} (0.386 sq mi or 247 acres) and river estuaries.

La Neuville-Saint-Pierre (French pronunciation: [la nøvil sɛ̃ pjɛʁ]) is a commune in the Oise department in northern France.

== See also ==
- Communes of the Oise department
