= Essuiles =

- Commune
- Location of Essuiles
- Location within France Location within Hauts-de-France
- Coordinates: 49°28′46″N 2°17′40″E
- Country: France
- Region: Hauts-de-France
- Department: Oise
- Arrondissement: Clermont
- Canton: Saint-Just-en-Chaussée
- Intercommunality: Plateau Picard

Government
  - Mayor (2020–2026): Régis Vandewalle
- Area^{1}: 13.54 km^{2} (5.23 sq mi)
- Elevation: 100 m (330 ft)
- Highest elevation: 146 m (479 ft)
- Lowest elevation: 80 m (260 ft)
- Population (2023): 505
  - Density: 37.3/km^{2} (96.6/sq mi)
- Time zone: UTC+01:00 (CET)
  - Summer (DST): UTC+02:00 (CEST)
- INSEE/Postal code: 60222 /60510
- ^{1} French Land Register data, which excludes lakes, ponds, glaciers > 1 km^{2} (0.386 sq mi or 247 acres) and river estuaries.

Essuiles (French pronunciation: [ɛsɥil]) is a commune in the Oise department in northern France.

== See also ==
- Communes of the Oise department
