= Brunvillers-la-Motte =

- Commune
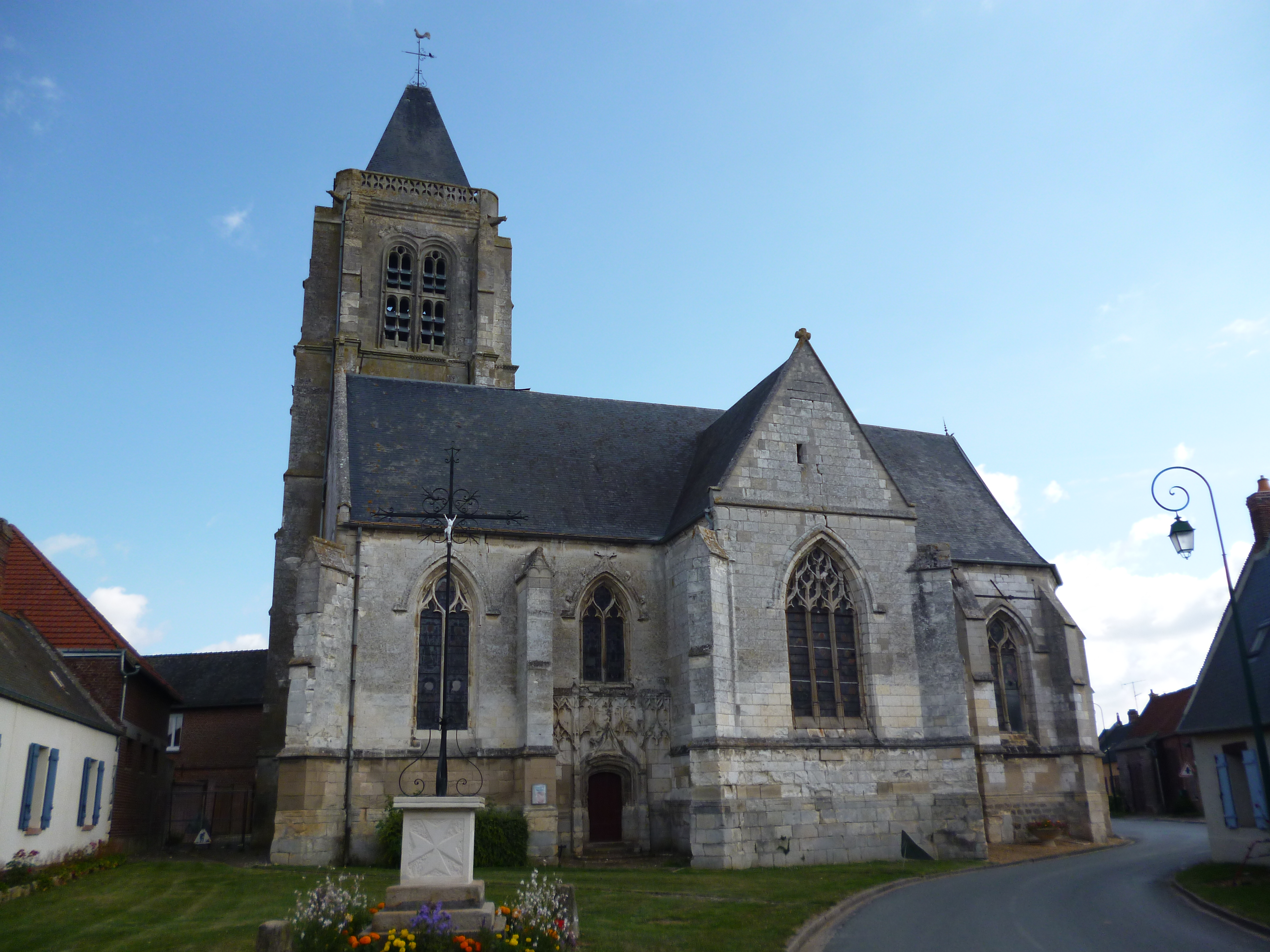
- The church in Brunvillers
- Location of Brunvillers-la-Motte
- Location within France Location within Hauts-de-France
- Coordinates: 49°33′00″N 2°27′05″E
- Country: France
- Region: Hauts-de-France
- Department: Oise
- Arrondissement: Clermont
- Canton: Saint-Just-en-Chaussée
- Intercommunality: Plateau Picard

Government
  - Mayor (2020–2026): Eric Waffelaert
- Area^{1}: 6.5 km^{2} (2.5 sq mi)
- Elevation: 132 m (433 ft)
- Highest elevation: 135 m (443 ft)
- Lowest elevation: 110 m (360 ft)
- Population (2023): 335
  - Density: 52/km^{2} (130/sq mi)
- Time zone: UTC+01:00 (CET)
  - Summer (DST): UTC+02:00 (CEST)
- INSEE/Postal code: 60112 /60130
- ^{1} French Land Register data, which excludes lakes, ponds, glaciers > 1 km^{2} (0.386 sq mi or 247 acres) and river estuaries.

Brunvillers-la-Motte (French pronunciation: [bʁœ̃vile la mɔt]) is a commune in the Oise department in northern France.

== Population ==
Historical population
Year	Pop.	±% p.a.
1968	210	—
1975	195	−1.05%
1982	218	+1.61%
1990	353	+6.21%
1999	337	−0.51%
2007	329	−0.30%
2012	332	+0.18%
2017	344	+0.71%
2023	335	−0.44%
Source: INSEE

== See also ==
- Communes of the Oise department
