= Oursel-Maison =

- Commune
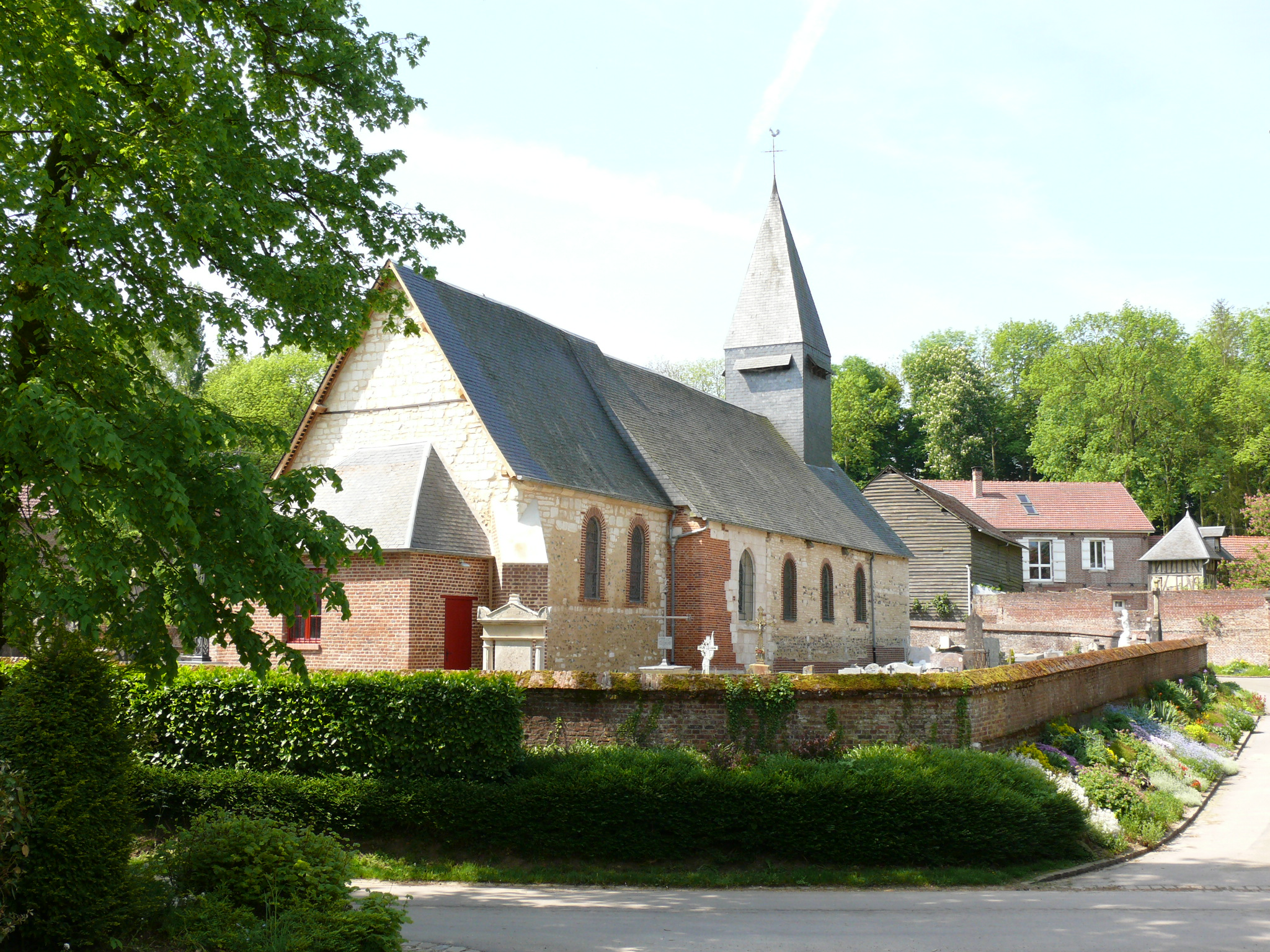
- The church in Oursel-Maison
- Location of Oursel-Maison
- Location within France Location within Hauts-de-France
- Coordinates: 49°35′49″N 2°10′56″E
- Country: France
- Region: Hauts-de-France
- Department: Oise
- Arrondissement: Clermont
- Canton: Saint-Just-en-Chaussée

Government
  - Mayor (2020–2026): Alain Vasselle
- Area^{1}: 6.97 km^{2} (2.69 sq mi)
- Elevation: 150 m (490 ft)
- Highest elevation: 190 m (620 ft)
- Lowest elevation: 146 m (479 ft)
- Population (2023): 248
  - Density: 35.6/km^{2} (92.2/sq mi)
- Time zone: UTC+01:00 (CET)
  - Summer (DST): UTC+02:00 (CEST)
- INSEE/Postal code: 60485 /60480
- ^{1} French Land Register data, which excludes lakes, ponds, glaciers > 1 km^{2} (0.386 sq mi or 247 acres) and river estuaries.

Oursel-Maison (French pronunciation: [uʁsɛl mɛzɔ̃]) is a commune in the Oise department in northern France.

Its name was spelled Ourcel-Maison until August 26, 2004.

== See also ==
- Communes of the Oise department
