= Choqueuse-les-Bénards =

- Commune
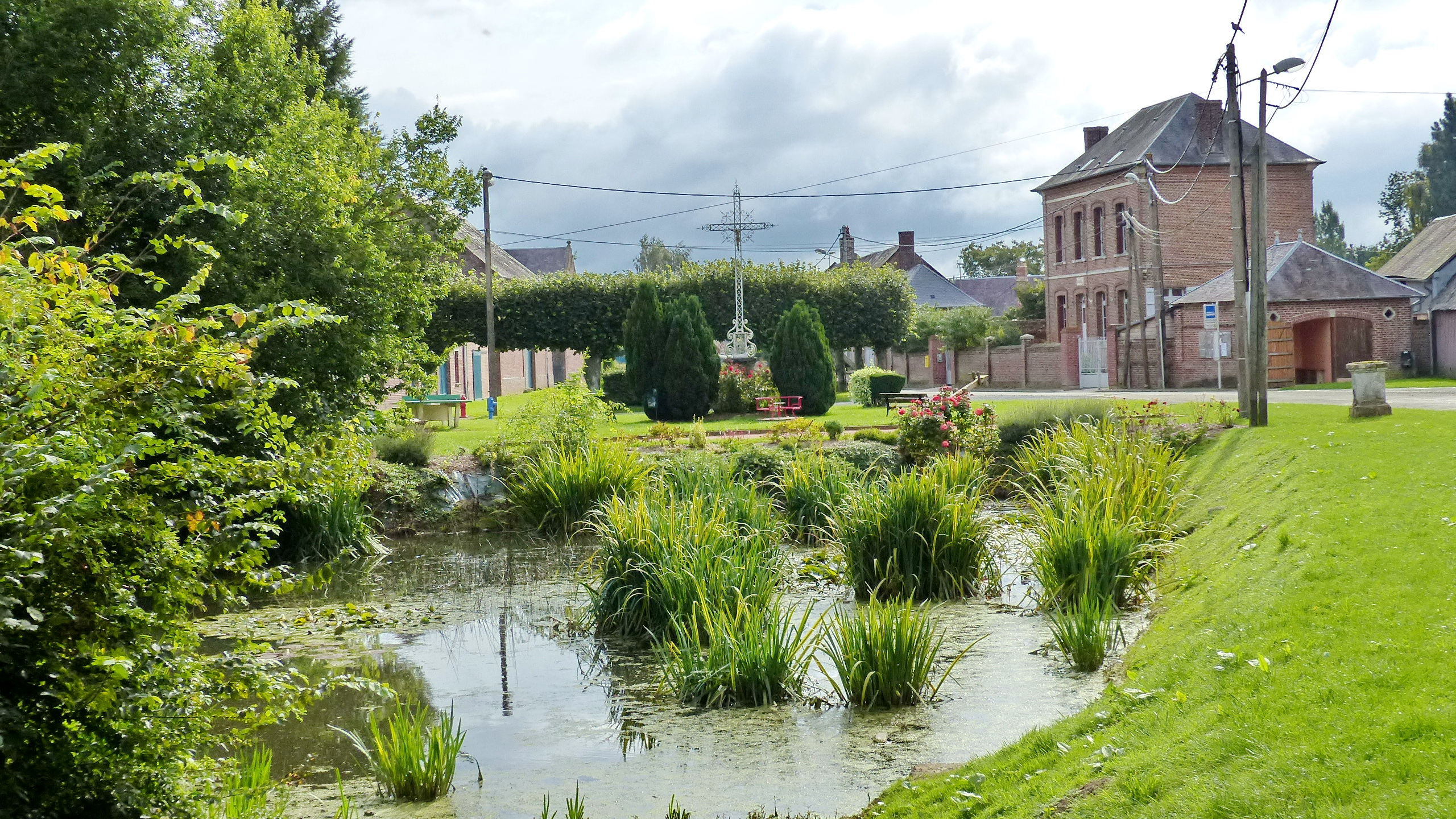
- The pond, cross and town hall in Choqueuse-les-Bénards
- Location of Choqueuse-les-Bénards
- Location within France Location within Hauts-de-France
- Coordinates: 49°39′10″N 2°04′59″E
- Country: France
- Region: Hauts-de-France
- Department: Oise
- Arrondissement: Beauvais
- Canton: Saint-Just-en-Chaussée

Government
  - Mayor (2020–2026): Brigitte Flament
- Area^{1}: 4.16 km^{2} (1.61 sq mi)
- Elevation: 140 m (460 ft)
- Highest elevation: 174 m (571 ft)
- Lowest elevation: 104 m (341 ft)
- Population (2023): 98
  - Density: 24/km^{2} (61/sq mi)
- Time zone: UTC+01:00 (CET)
  - Summer (DST): UTC+02:00 (CEST)
- INSEE/Postal code: 60153 /60360
- ^{1} French Land Register data, which excludes lakes, ponds, glaciers > 1 km^{2} (0.386 sq mi or 247 acres) and river estuaries.

Choqueuse-les-Bénards (French pronunciation: [ʃɔkøz le benaʁ]) is a commune in the Oise department in northern France.

== See also ==
- Communes of the Oise department
