= Fléchy =

- Commune
- Location of Fléchy
- Location within France Location within Hauts-de-France
- Coordinates: 49°39′35″N 2°13′59″E
- Country: France
- Region: Hauts-de-France
- Department: Oise
- Arrondissement: Clermont
- Canton: Saint-Just-en-Chaussée

Government
  - Mayor (2020–2026): Jean-Christophe Vitte
- Area^{1}: 4.77 km^{2} (1.84 sq mi)
- Elevation: 125 m (410 ft)
- Highest elevation: 169 m (554 ft)
- Lowest elevation: 99 m (325 ft)
- Population (2023): 84
  - Density: 18/km^{2} (46/sq mi)
- Time zone: UTC+01:00 (CET)
  - Summer (DST): UTC+02:00 (CEST)
- INSEE/Postal code: 60237 /60120
- ^{1} French Land Register data, which excludes lakes, ponds, glaciers > 1 km^{2} (0.386 sq mi or 247 acres) and river estuaries.

Fléchy (French pronunciation: [fleʃi]) is a commune in the Oise department in northern France.

== See also ==
- Communes of the Oise department
