= Canton of Saint-Just-en-Chaussée =

Canton of France

Coordinates: 49.51°N 2.43°E

- Canton
- Situation of the canton of Saint-Just-en-Chaussée in the department of Oise
- Country: France
- Region: Hauts-de-France
- Department: Oise
- No. of communes: {{{nbcomm}}}
- Population (2023): 43,784
- INSEE code: 6019

The canton of Saint-Just-en-Chaussée is an administrative division of the Oise department, northern France. Its borders were modified at the French canton reorganisation which came into effect in March 2015. Its seat is in Saint-Just-en-Chaussée.

It consists of the following communes:

1. Abbeville-Saint-Lucien
2. Airion
3. Angivillers
4. Ansauvillers
5. Auchy-la-Montagne
6. Avrechy
7. Bacouël
8. Beauvoir
9. Blancfossé
10. Bonneuil-les-Eaux
11. Bonvillers
12. Breteuil
13. Broyes
14. Brunvillers-la-Motte
15. Bucamps
16. Bulles
17. Campremy
18. Catheux
19. Catillon-Fumechon
20. Chepoix
21. Choqueuse-les-Bénards
22. Conteville
23. Cormeilles
24. Crèvecœur-le-Grand
25. Le Crocq
26. Croissy-sur-Celle
27. Cuignières
28. Doméliers
29. Erquinvillers
30. Esquennoy
31. Essuiles
32. Fléchy
33. Fontaine-Bonneleau
34. Fournival
35. Francastel
36. Froissy
37. Le Gallet
38. Gannes
39. Gouy-les-Groseillers
40. Hardivillers
41. La Hérelle
42. Lachaussée-du-Bois-d'Écu
43. Lieuvillers
44. Luchy
45. Maisoncelle-Tuilerie
46. Maulers
47. Le Mesnil-Saint-Firmin
48. Le Mesnil-sur-Bulles
49. Montreuil-sur-Brêche
50. Mory-Montcrux
51. Muidorge
52. La Neuville-Saint-Pierre
53. Noirémont
54. Noroy
55. Nourard-le-Franc
56. Noyers-Saint-Martin
57. Oursel-Maison
58. Paillart
59. Plainval
60. Plainville
61. Le Plessier-sur-Bulles
62. Le Plessier-sur-Saint-Just
63. Puits-la-Vallée
64. Le Quesnel-Aubry
65. Quinquempoix
66. Ravenel
67. Reuil-sur-Brêche
68. Rocquencourt
69. Rotangy
70. Rouvroy-les-Merles
71. Saint-André-Farivillers
72. Sainte-Eusoye
73. Saint-Just-en-Chaussée
74. Saint-Remy-en-l'Eau
75. Le Saulchoy
76. Sérévillers
77. Tartigny
78. Thieux
79. Troussencourt
80. Valescourt
81. Vendeuil-Caply
82. Viefvillers
83. Villers-Vicomte
84. Wavignies
