= Reuil-sur-Brêche =

- Commune
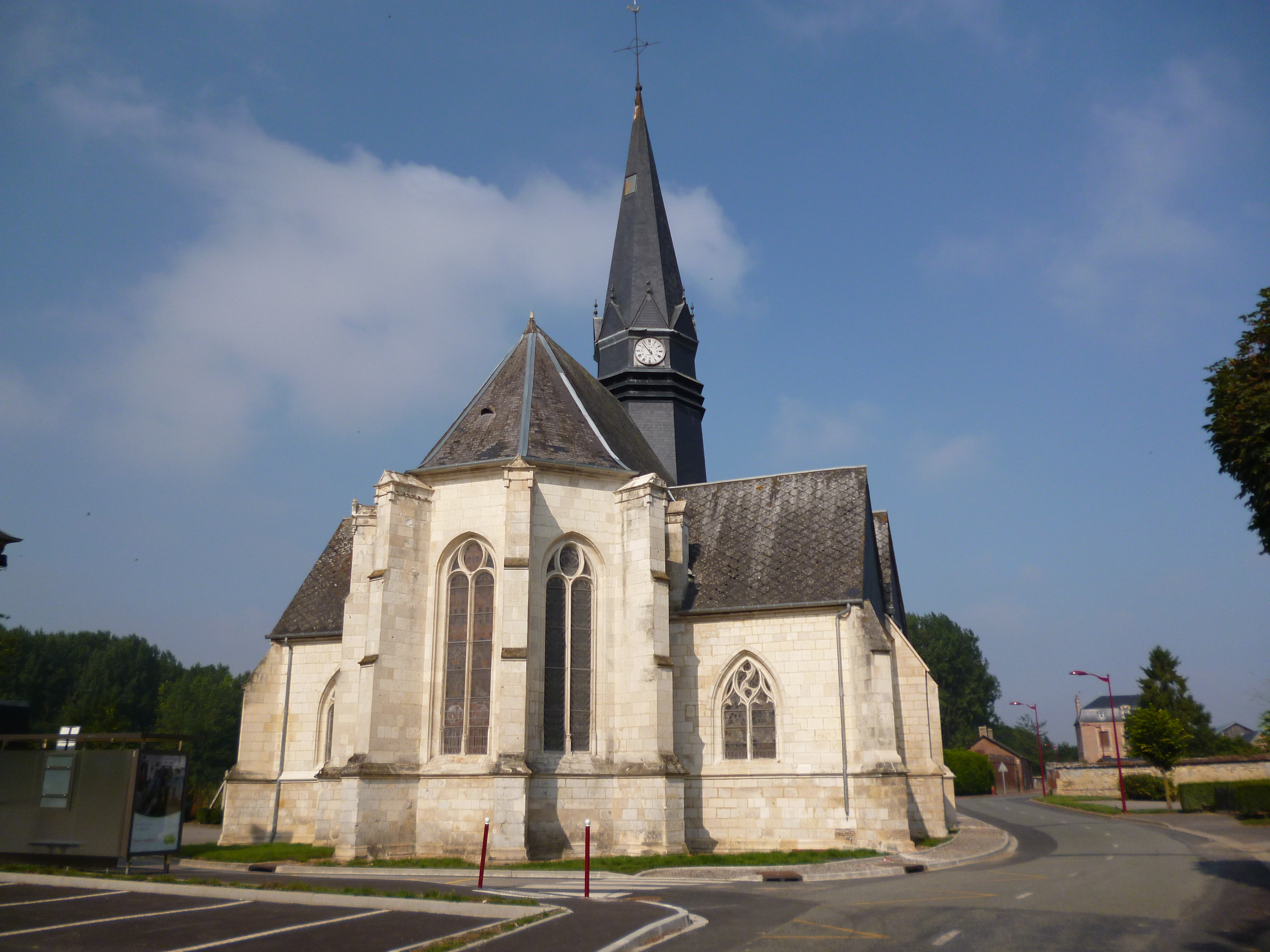
- The church in Reuil-sur-Brêche
- Location of Reuil-sur-Brêche
- Location within France Location within Hauts-de-France
- Coordinates: 49°31′17″N 2°13′19″E
- Country: France
- Region: Hauts-de-France
- Department: Oise
- Arrondissement: Clermont
- Canton: Saint-Just-en-Chaussée
- Intercommunality: Oise Picarde

Government
  - Mayor (2020–2026): Marc-Philippe Ribeiro
- Area^{1}: 12.58 km^{2} (4.86 sq mi)
- Elevation: 110 m (360 ft)
- Highest elevation: 161 m (528 ft)
- Lowest elevation: 100 m (330 ft)
- Population (2023): 329
  - Density: 26.2/km^{2} (67.7/sq mi)
- Time zone: UTC+01:00 (CET)
  - Summer (DST): UTC+02:00 (CEST)
- INSEE/Postal code: 60535 /60480
- ^{1} French Land Register data, which excludes lakes, ponds, glaciers > 1 km^{2} (0.386 sq mi or 247 acres) and river estuaries.

Reuil-sur-Brêche (French pronunciation: [ʁœj syʁ bʁɛʃ]) is a commune in the Oise department in northern France.

== Population ==
Historical population
Year	Pop.	±% p.a.
1968	194	—
1975	207	+0.93%
1982	196	−0.78%
1990	221	+1.51%
1999	206	−0.78%
2007	266	+3.25%
2012	309	+3.04%
2017	329	+1.26%
2023	329	+0.00%
Source: INSEE

== See also ==
- Communes of the Oise department
