= Esquennoy =

- Commune
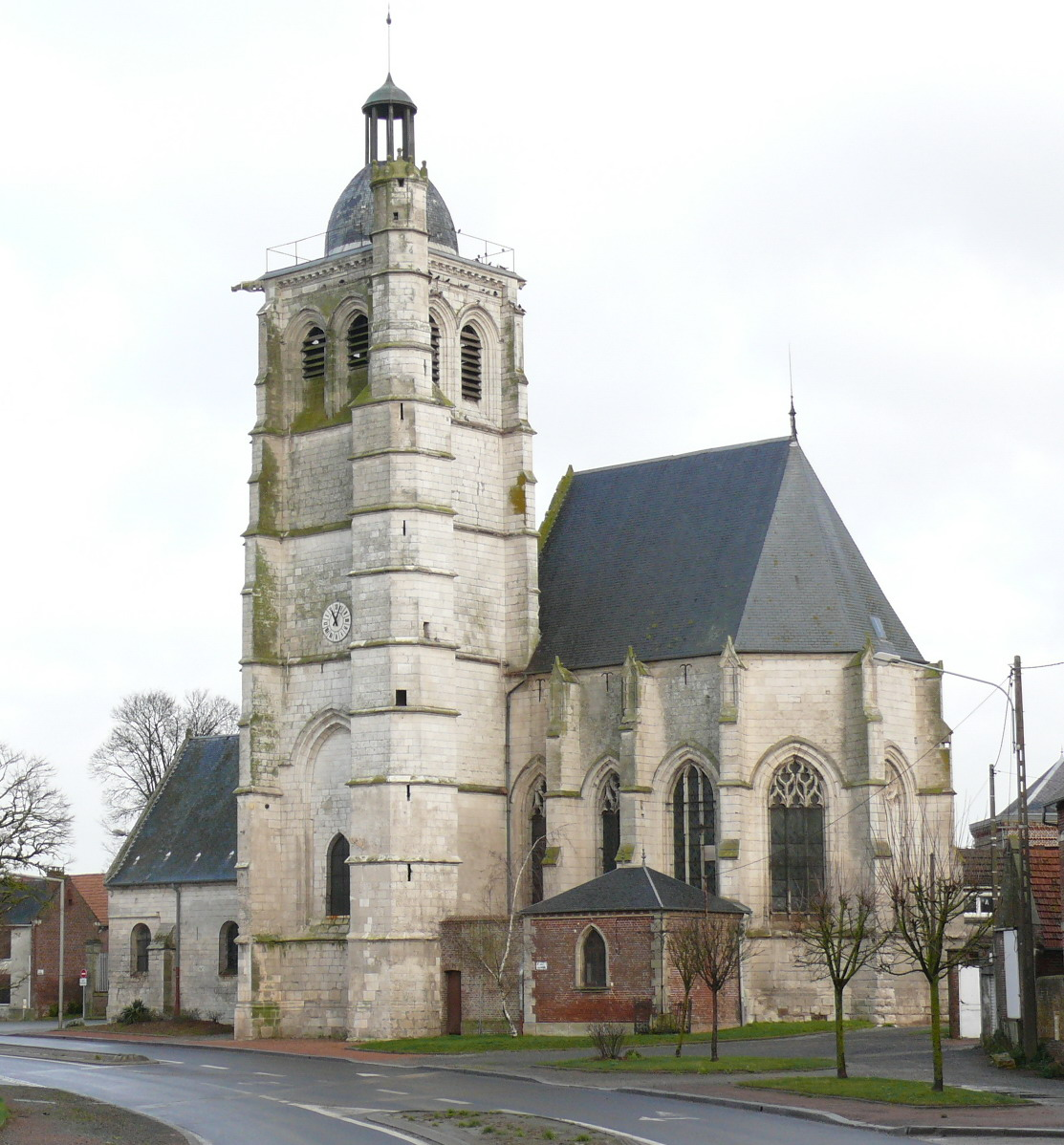
- The church in Esquennoy

- Coat of arms
- Location of Esquennoy
- Location within France Location within Hauts-de-France
- Coordinates: 49°39′25″N 2°16′10″E
- Country: France
- Region: Hauts-de-France
- Department: Oise
- Arrondissement: Clermont
- Canton: Saint-Just-en-Chaussée

Government
  - Mayor (2020–2026): Sylvain Germain
- Area^{1}: 9.79 km^{2} (3.78 sq mi)
- Elevation: 110 m (360 ft)
- Highest elevation: 170 m (560 ft)
- Lowest elevation: 74 m (243 ft)
- Population (2023): 732
  - Density: 74.8/km^{2} (194/sq mi)
- Time zone: UTC+01:00 (CET)
  - Summer (DST): UTC+02:00 (CEST)
- INSEE/Postal code: 60221 /60120
- ^{1} French Land Register data, which excludes lakes, ponds, glaciers > 1 km^{2} (0.386 sq mi or 247 acres) and river estuaries.

Esquennoy (French pronunciation: [ekɛnwa]) is a commune in the Oise department in northern France.

== See also ==
- Communes of the Oise department
