= Broyes, Oise =

Broyes
- Commune
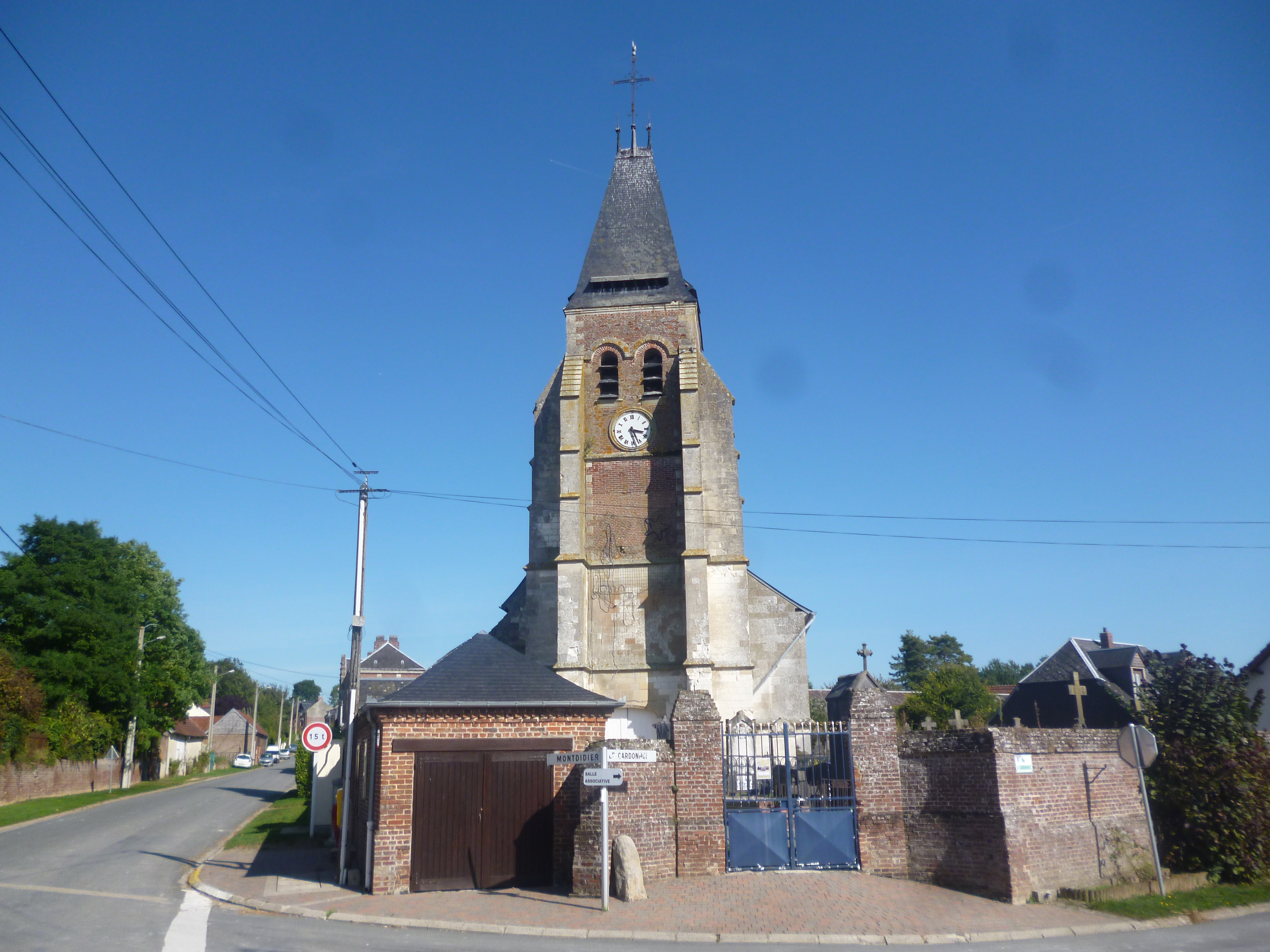
- The church in Broyes
- Location of Broyes
- Location within France Location within Hauts-de-France
- Coordinates: 49°37′45″N 2°27′28″E
- Country: France
- Region: Hauts-de-France
- Department: Oise
- Arrondissement: Clermont
- Canton: Saint-Just-en-Chaussée

Government
  - Mayor (2020–2026): Thierry Vandeputte
- Area^{1}: 4.8 km^{2} (1.9 sq mi)
- Elevation: 185 m (607 ft)
- Highest elevation: 156 m (512 ft)
- Lowest elevation: 88 m (289 ft)
- Population (2023): 150
  - Density: 31/km^{2} (81/sq mi)
- Time zone: UTC+01:00 (CET)
  - Summer (DST): UTC+02:00 (CEST)
- INSEE/Postal code: 60111 /60120
- ^{1} French Land Register data, which excludes lakes, ponds, glaciers > 1 km^{2} (0.386 sq mi or 247 acres) and river estuaries.

Broyes (French pronunciation: [bʁwa]) is a commune in the Oise department in northern France.

== Population ==
Historical population
Year	Pop.	±% p.a.
1968	130	—
1975	149	+1.97%
1982	145	−0.39%
1990	124	−1.94%
1999	112	−1.12%
2007	142	+3.01%
2012	168	+3.42%
2017	172	+0.47%
2023	150	−2.26%
Source: INSEE

== See also ==
- Communes of the Oise department
