= Conteville, Oise =

Conteville
- Commune
- Location of Conteville
- Location within France Location within Hauts-de-France
- Coordinates: 49°39′06″N 2°03′39″E
- Country: France
- Region: Hauts-de-France
- Department: Oise
- Arrondissement: Beauvais
- Canton: Saint-Just-en-Chaussée

Government
  - Mayor (2020–2026): Jean Baptiste Carpentier
- Area^{1}: 3.62 km^{2} (1.40 sq mi)
- Elevation: 318 m (1,043 ft)
- Highest elevation: 178 m (584 ft)
- Lowest elevation: 120 m (390 ft)
- Population (2023): 71
  - Density: 20/km^{2} (51/sq mi)
- Time zone: UTC+01:00 (CET)
  - Summer (DST): UTC+02:00 (CEST)
- INSEE/Postal code: 60161 /60360
- ^{1} French Land Register data, which excludes lakes, ponds, glaciers > 1 km^{2} (0.386 sq mi or 247 acres) and river estuaries.

Conteville (French pronunciation: [kɔ̃tvil]) is a commune in the Oise department in northern France.

== Population ==
Historical population
Year	Pop.	±% p.a.
1968	93	—
1975	82	−1.78%
1982	68	−2.64%
1990	75	+1.23%
1999	76	+0.15%
2007	79	+0.49%
2012	83	+0.99%
2017	73	−2.53%
2023	71	−0.46%
Source: INSEE

== See also ==
- Communes of the Oise department
