= Airion =

- Commune
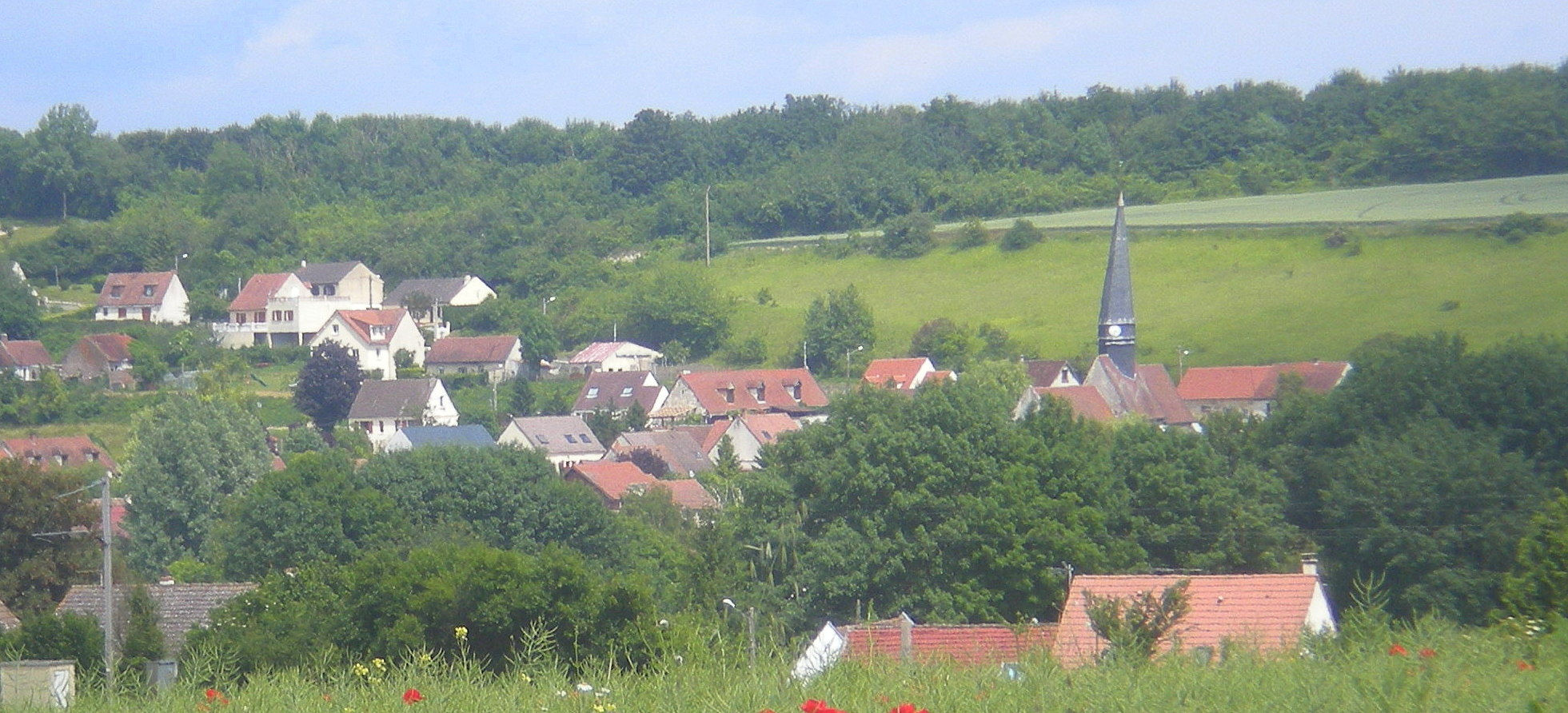
- A general view of Airion
- Location of Airion
- Location within France Location within Hauts-de-France
- Coordinates: 49°25′32″N 2°24′51″E
- Country: France
- Region: Hauts-de-France
- Department: Oise
- Arrondissement: Clermont
- Canton: Saint-Just-en-Chaussée
- Intercommunality: Plateau Picard

Government
  - Mayor (2020–2026): Sandrine Dretz
- Area^{1}: 6.73 km^{2} (2.60 sq mi)
- Elevation: 60 m (200 ft)
- Highest elevation: 131 m (430 ft)
- Lowest elevation: 54 m (177 ft)
- Population (2023): 409
  - Density: 60.8/km^{2} (157/sq mi)
- Time zone: UTC+01:00 (CET)
  - Summer (DST): UTC+02:00 (CEST)
- INSEE/Postal code: 60008 /60600
- ^{1} French Land Register data, which excludes lakes, ponds, glaciers > 1 km^{2} (0.386 sq mi or 247 acres) and river estuaries.

Airion (French pronunciation: [ɛʁjɔ̃]) is a commune in the Oise department in northern France.

== Population ==
Historical population
Year	Pop.	±% p.a.
1968	171	—
1975	205	+2.62%
1982	346	+7.76%
1990	474	+4.01%
1999	470	−0.09%
2007	500	+0.78%
2012	447	−2.22%
2017	399	−2.25%
2023	409	+0.41%
Source: INSEE

== See also ==
- Communes of the Oise department
