= Valescourt =

- Commune
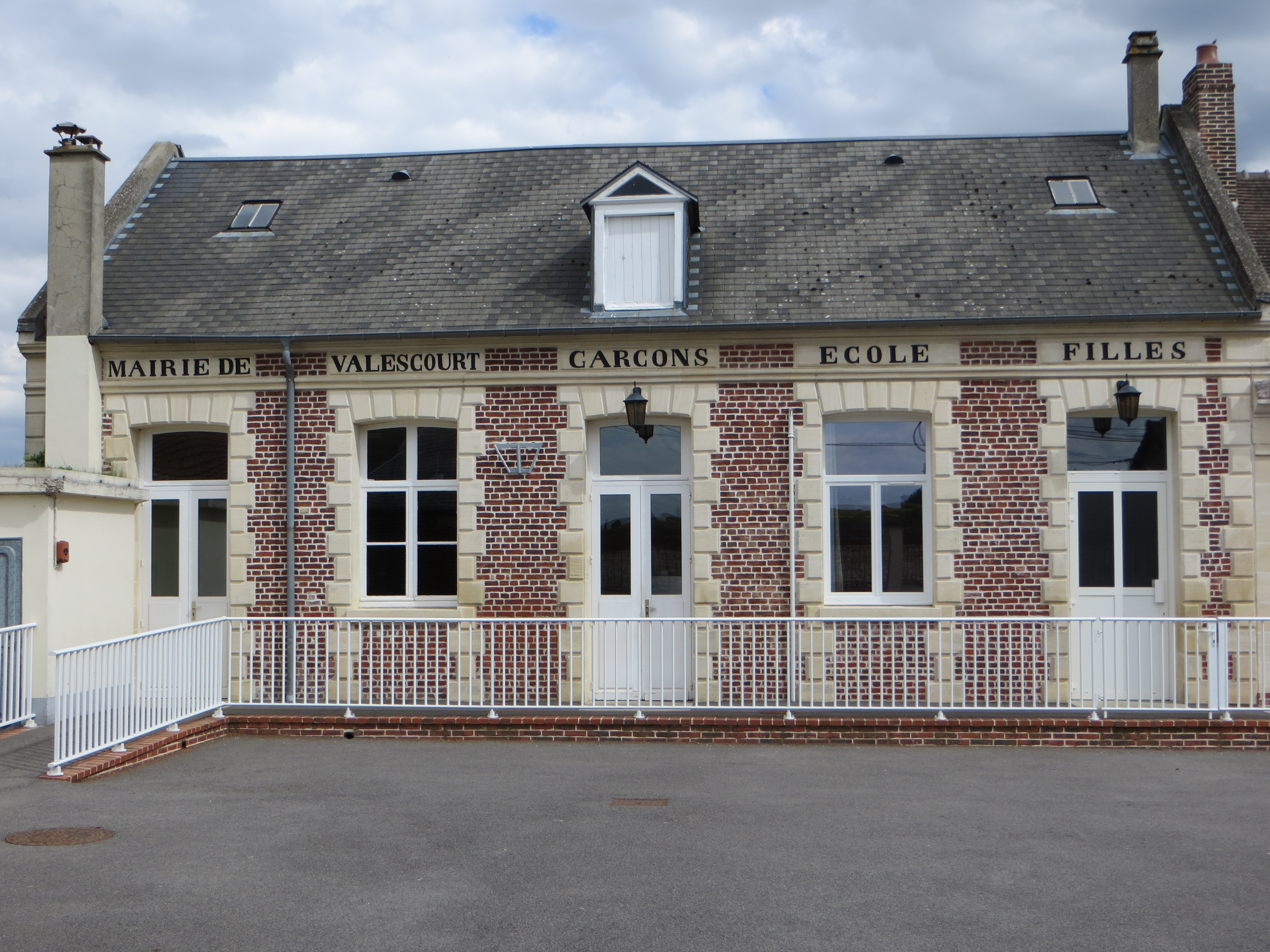
- The town hall in Valescourt
- Location of Valescourt
- Location within France Location within Hauts-de-France
- Coordinates: 49°29′04″N 2°26′13″E
- Country: France
- Region: Hauts-de-France
- Department: Oise
- Arrondissement: Clermont
- Canton: Saint-Just-en-Chaussée
- Intercommunality: Plateau Picard

Government
  - Mayor (2020–2026): Jean-Pierre Gourdou
- Area^{1}: 6.87 km^{2} (2.65 sq mi)
- Elevation: 121 m (397 ft)
- Highest elevation: 171 m (561 ft)
- Lowest elevation: 82 m (269 ft)
- Population (2023): 295
  - Density: 42.9/km^{2} (111/sq mi)
- Time zone: UTC+01:00 (CET)
  - Summer (DST): UTC+02:00 (CEST)
- INSEE/Postal code: 60653 /60130
- ^{1} French Land Register data, which excludes lakes, ponds, glaciers > 1 km^{2} (0.386 sq mi or 247 acres) and river estuaries.

Valescourt is a commune in the Oise department in northern France.

== See also ==
- Communes of the Oise department
