= Gouy-les-Groseillers =

- Commune
- Location of Gouy-les-Groseillers
- Location within France Location within Hauts-de-France
- Coordinates: 49°41′40″N 2°13′06″E
- Country: France
- Region: Hauts-de-France
- Department: Oise
- Arrondissement: Clermont
- Canton: Saint-Just-en-Chaussée

Government
  - Mayor (2022–2026): Benoît Minart
- Area^{1}: 3.07 km^{2} (1.19 sq mi)
- Elevation: 100 m (330 ft)
- Highest elevation: 166 m (545 ft)
- Lowest elevation: 107 m (351 ft)
- Population (2023): 15
  - Density: 4.9/km^{2} (13/sq mi)
- Time zone: UTC+01:00 (CET)
  - Summer (DST): UTC+02:00 (CEST)
- INSEE/Postal code: 60283 /60120
- ^{1} French Land Register data, which excludes lakes, ponds, glaciers > 1 km^{2} (0.386 sq mi or 247 acres) and river estuaries.

Gouy-les-Groseillers (French pronunciation: [ɡwi le ɡʁozɛje]) is a commune in the Oise department in northern France.

== See also ==
- Communes of the Oise department
