= Ansauvillers =

- Commune
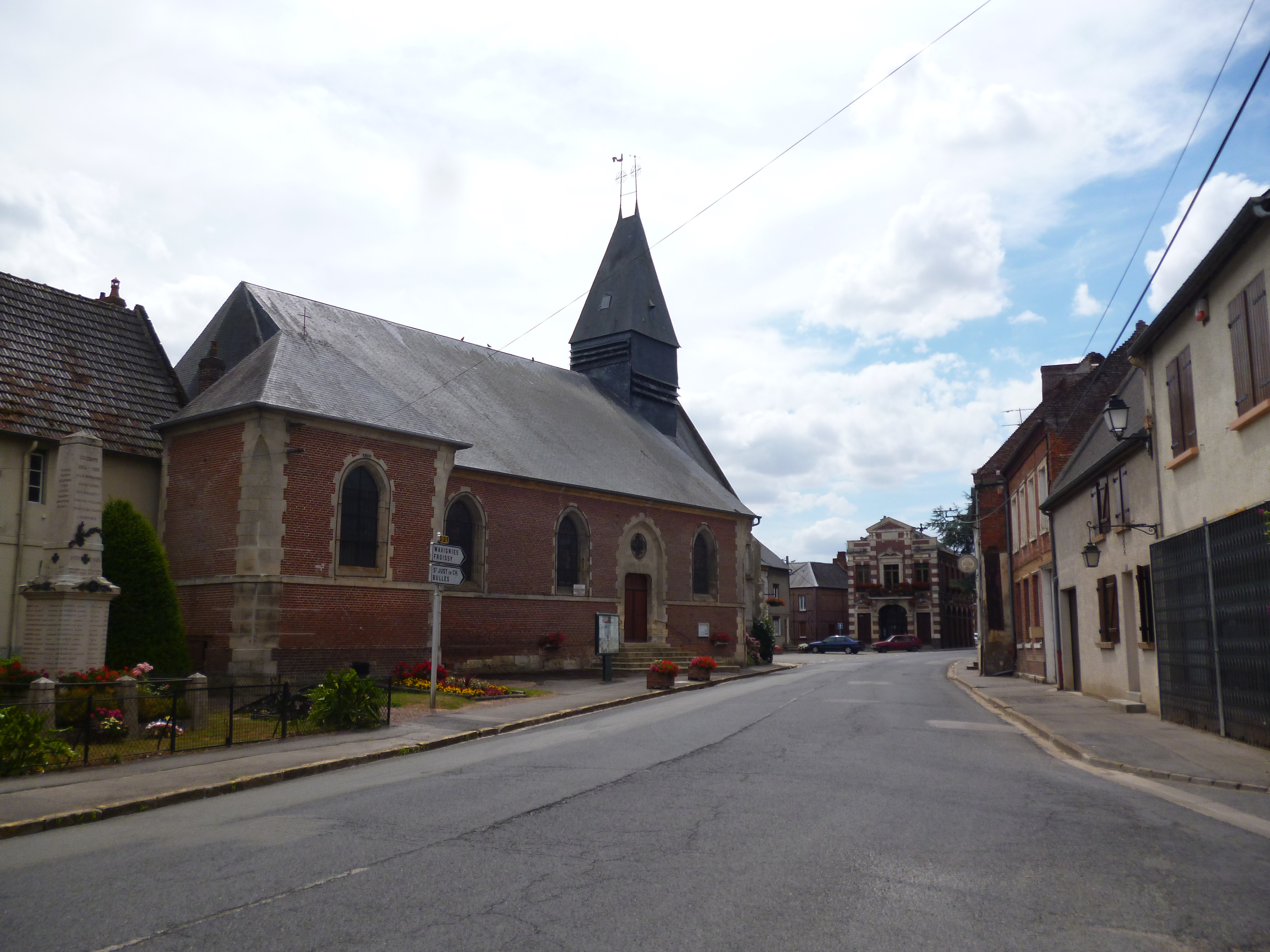
- The war memorial, church and town hall in Ansauvillers
- Location of Ansauvillers
- Location within France Location within Hauts-de-France
- Coordinates: 49°33′55″N 2°23′21″E
- Country: France
- Region: Hauts-de-France
- Department: Oise
- Arrondissement: Clermont
- Canton: Saint-Just-en-Chaussée

Government
  - Mayor (2020–2026): Dominique Dufresnes
- Area^{1}: 6.95 km^{2} (2.68 sq mi)
- Elevation: 150 m (490 ft)
- Highest elevation: 151 m (495 ft)
- Lowest elevation: 121 m (397 ft)
- Population (2023): 1,134
  - Density: 163/km^{2} (423/sq mi)
- Time zone: UTC+01:00 (CET)
  - Summer (DST): UTC+02:00 (CEST)
- INSEE/Postal code: 60017 /60120
- ^{1} French Land Register data, which excludes lakes, ponds, glaciers > 1 km^{2} (0.386 sq mi or 247 acres) and river estuaries.

Ansauvillers (French pronunciation: [ɑ̃sovile]) is a commune in the Oise department in northern France.

== Population ==
Historical population
Year	Pop.	±% p.a.
1968	650	—
1975	691	+0.88%
1982	674	−0.36%
1990	927	+4.06%
1999	1,049	+1.38%
2007	1,192	+1.61%
2012	1,228	+0.60%
2017	1,197	−0.51%
2023	1,134	−0.90%
Source: INSEE

== See also ==
- Communes of the Oise department
