= Cuignières =

- Commune
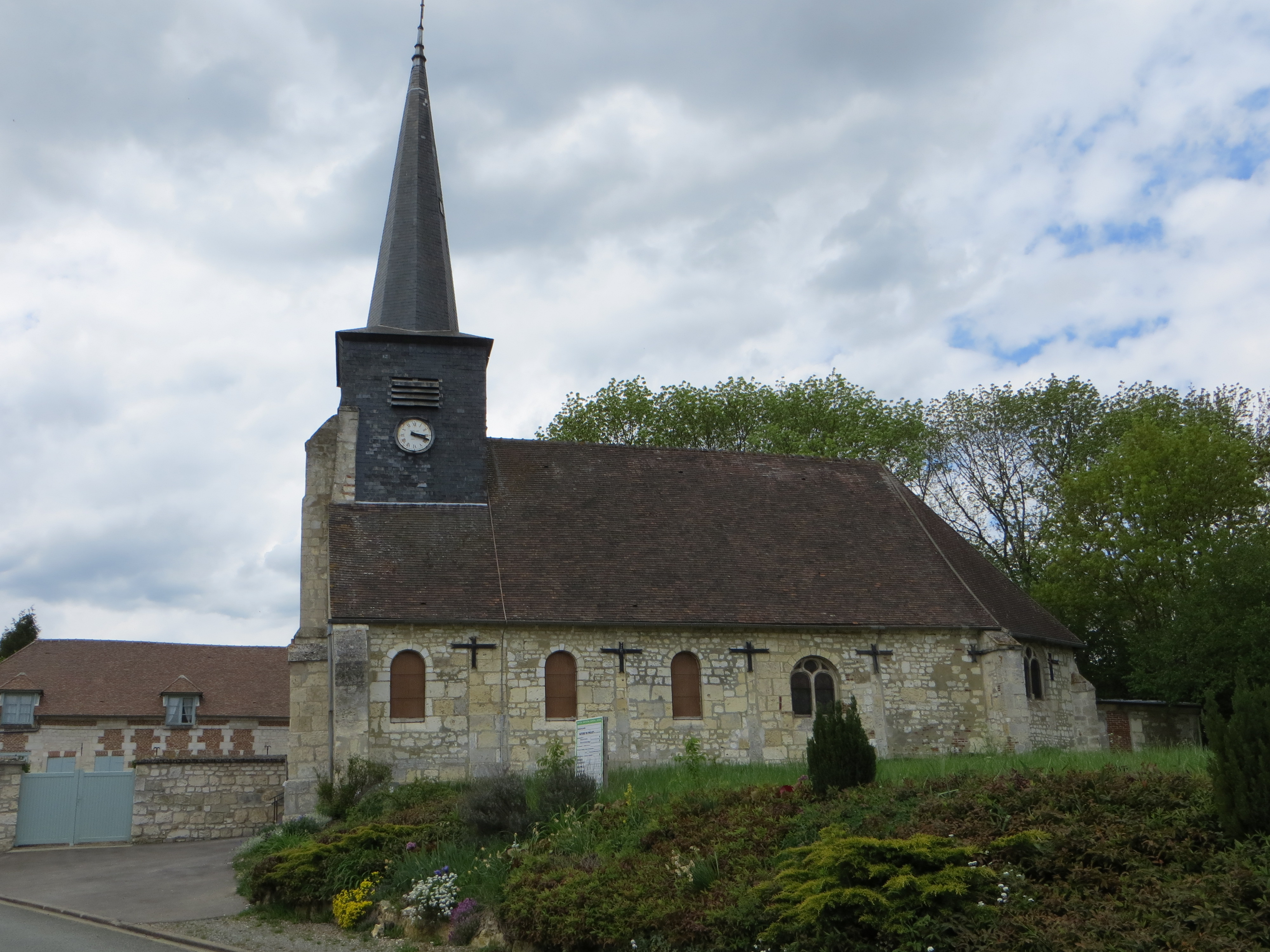
- The church in Cuignières
- Location of Cuignières
- Location within France Location within Hauts-de-France
- Coordinates: 49°27′05″N 2°28′28″E
- Country: France
- Region: Hauts-de-France
- Department: Oise
- Arrondissement: Clermont
- Canton: Saint-Just-en-Chaussée
- Intercommunality: Plateau Picard

Government
  - Mayor (2020–2026): Philippe Farce
- Area^{1}: 6.24 km^{2} (2.41 sq mi)
- Elevation: 170 m (560 ft)
- Highest elevation: 163 m (535 ft)
- Lowest elevation: 95 m (312 ft)
- Population (2023): 274
  - Density: 43.9/km^{2} (114/sq mi)
- Time zone: UTC+01:00 (CET)
  - Summer (DST): UTC+02:00 (CEST)
- INSEE/Postal code: 60186 /60130
- ^{1} French Land Register data, which excludes lakes, ponds, glaciers > 1 km^{2} (0.386 sq mi or 247 acres) and river estuaries.

Cuignières (French pronunciation: [kɥiɲɛʁ]) is a commune in the Oise department in northern France.

== See also ==
- Communes of the Oise department
