= Sainte-Eusoye =

- Commune
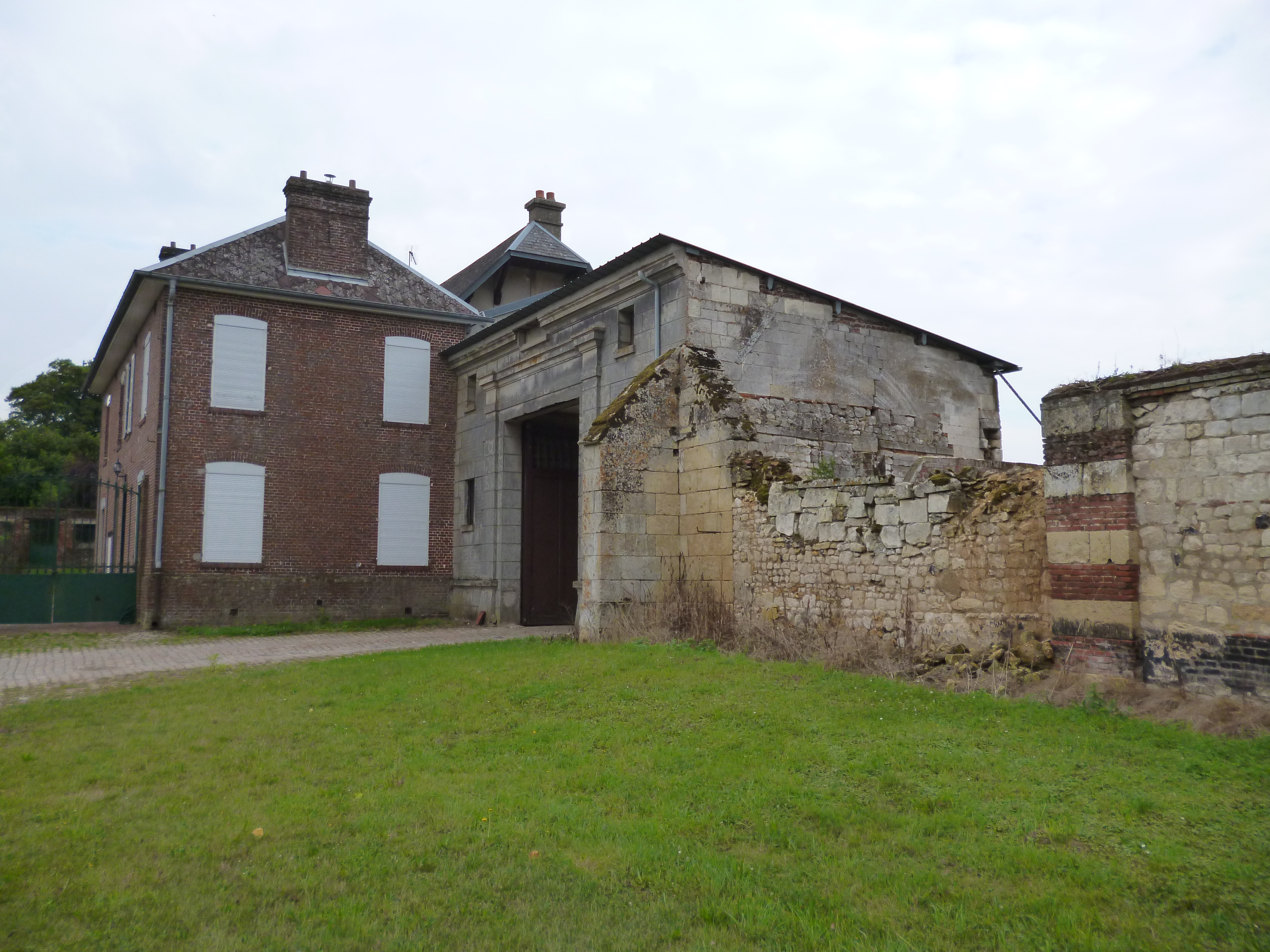
- Troussures farm, in Sainte-Eusoye
- Location of Sainte-Eusoye
- Location within France Location within Hauts-de-France
- Coordinates: 49°34′40″N 2°14′46″E
- Country: France
- Region: Hauts-de-France
- Department: Oise
- Arrondissement: Clermont
- Canton: Saint-Just-en-Chaussée

Government
  - Mayor (2020–2026): Pierre Dugrosprez
- Area^{1}: 8.48 km^{2} (3.27 sq mi)
- Elevation: 179 m (587 ft)
- Highest elevation: 178 m (584 ft)
- Lowest elevation: 95 m (312 ft)
- Population (2023): 331
  - Density: 39.0/km^{2} (101/sq mi)
- Time zone: UTC+01:00 (CET)
  - Summer (DST): UTC+02:00 (CEST)
- INSEE/Postal code: 60573 /60480
- ^{1} French Land Register data, which excludes lakes, ponds, glaciers > 1 km^{2} (0.386 sq mi or 247 acres) and river estuaries.

Sainte-Eusoye (French pronunciation: [sɛ̃t øzwa]) is a commune in the Oise department in northern France.

== See also ==
- Communes of the Oise department
