= Metre gauge railway from Fleurines and Villers-Saint-Frambourg to Pont-Sainte-Maxence =

Coordinates: 49.30248°N 2.60305°E

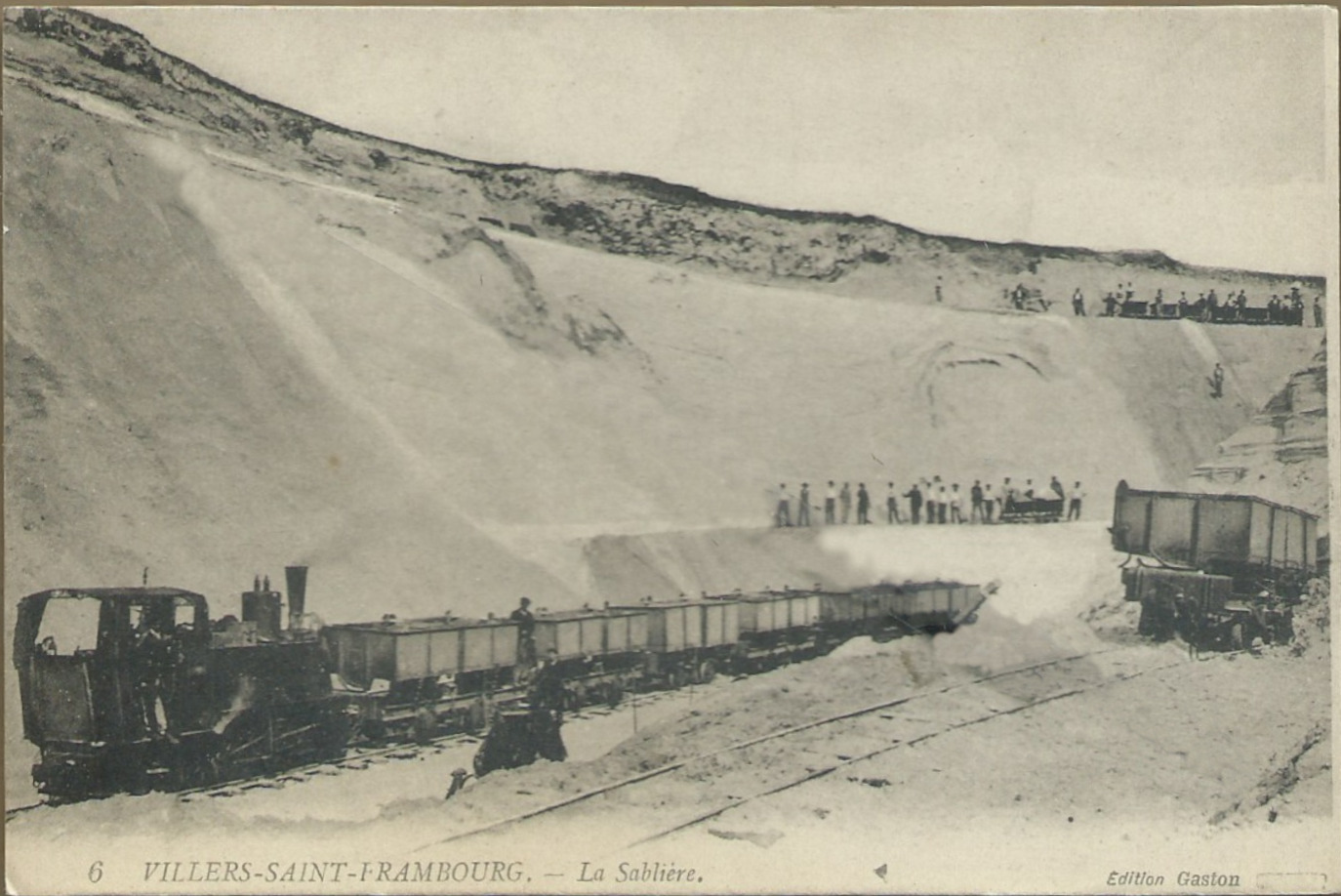
- Locomotive Attila in the sand pit of Villers-Saint-Frambourg

Technical
- Line length: 8.2 km (5.1 mi)
- Track gauge: 1,000 mm (3 ft 3 3/8 in)
Route map
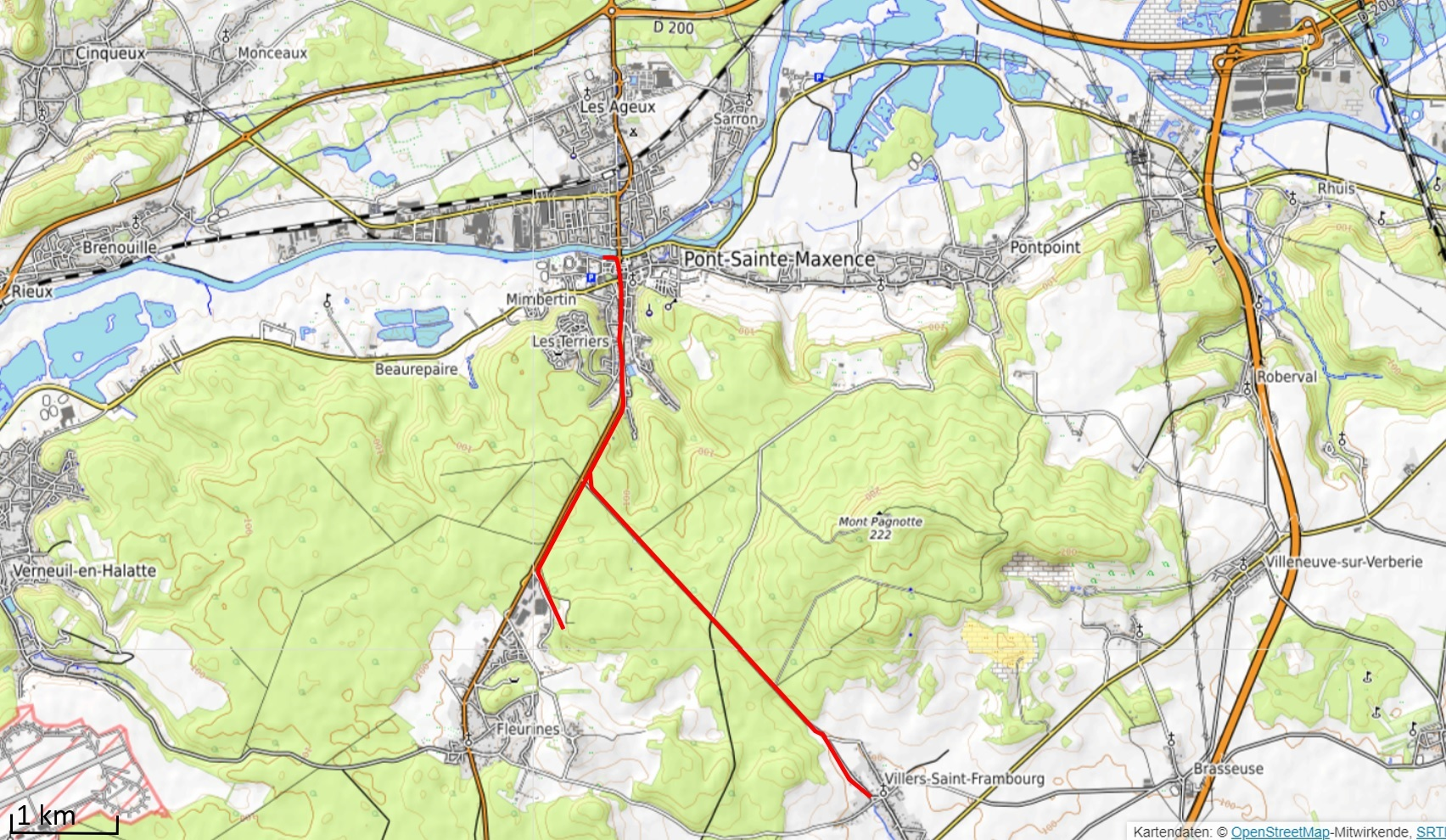
Former route superimposed onto a modern map

The metre gauge railway from Fleurines and Villers-Saint-Frambourg to Pont-Sainte-Maxence (French: La voie ferrée de Fleurines et Villers St Frambourg à Pont St Maxence) was a 8.2 km (5.1 mi) long light railway with a gauge of 1,000 mm (3 ft 3 3/8 in) running from the sand pits at Fleurines and Villers-Saint-Frambourg to the wharf at Pont-Sainte-Maxence on the River Oise in the department Oise in the Hauts-de-France region of France (until 2016: Picardy).

== Route ==
The 3.8 km (2.4 mi) long trunk line started at Carrière les Communes in the Vallée des Peaux Rouges at Fleurines. The 4.4 km (2.7 mi) long straight branch line started at the sand pit of Villers-Saint-Frambourg. They joined at the forester's lodge (Maison Forestière du Grand Maitre) in the Forêt d'Halatte and ran along the N17 national road to the Oise port at Pont-Sainte-Maxence.

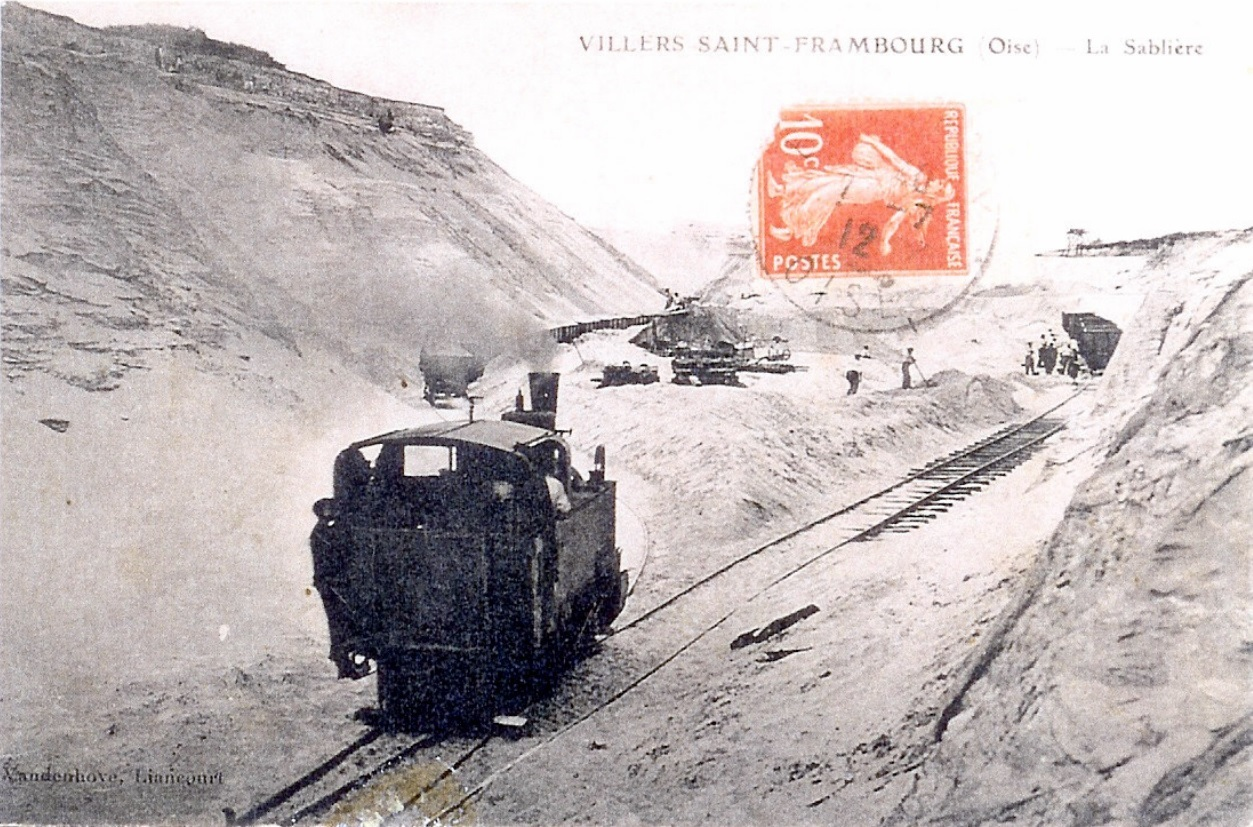
Sand pit near Villers-Saint-Frambourg

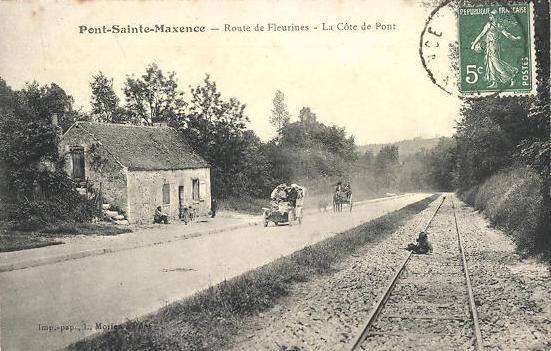
Track alongside the National Road N17

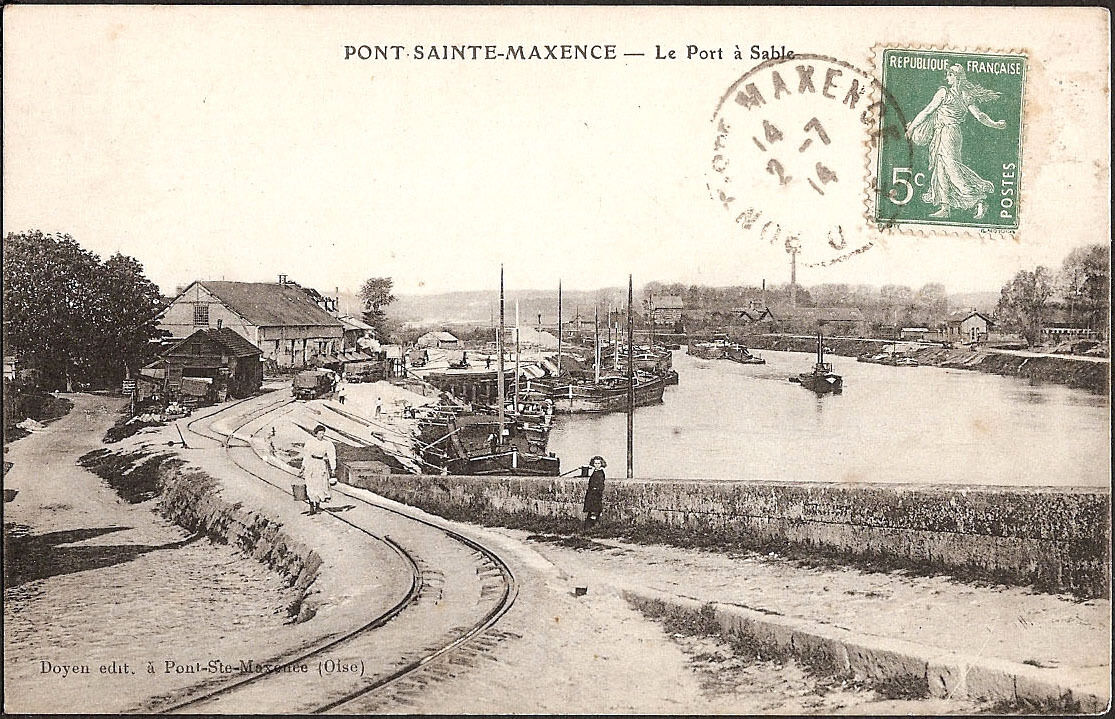
Wharf on the River Oise at Pont-Sainte-Maxence

== History ==
The light railway was probably first laid at the end of the 19th century.

The Société Anonyme des Sablières de l'Oise et de la Région de Fontainebleau supplied the Compagnie de Saint Gobain with sand for glass production until disputes arose between the two companies and the municipality of Fleurines during the First World War. Attempts of arbitration were unsuccessful, so the sand pits and the light railway were closed down. The Société des Sablières de l'Oise, which owned several sand pits in the area, removed the tracks from Fleurines to Pont-Sainte-Maxence around 1920 and used the rails for the 600 mm gauge Tramway at Villeneuve-sur-Verberie from the sand pits at Villeneuve-sur-Verberie and Roberval to the port at Moru on the Oise.

Around 1975, the company Sofraco mined again sand from the sand pit, which was transported by lorries, until operations ceased around 1984.
