= Armorial of the Communes of Oise (Q–Z) =

This page lists the armoury (emblazons=graphics and blazons=heraldic descriptions; or coats of arms) of the communes from Q-Z in Oise (department 60)

Other pages:

- Armorial of the Communes of Oise (A–C)
- Armorial of the Communes of Oise (D–H)
- Armorial of the Communes of Oise (I–P)
- Armorial of the Communes of Oise (Q–Z)

== Q ==
There are currently no Communes in Oise with coat of arms that starts with Q: Quesmy, Le Quesnel-Aubry, Quincampoix-Fleuzy, Quinquempoix

== R ==
Image	Name of Commune	French original blazon	English blazon
	Ravenel	de gueules à un ravenel au naturel.	Gules, a ravenel proper. (a ravenel is apparently a type of horseradish. However the stylized plant used on the commune's arms doesn't much resemble an actual horseradish plant...)
	Reilly	écartelé d'argent au lévrier de sable et de gueules à l'étoile d'or à 6 rais.	Quarterly 'argent a greyhound [courant] sable' and 'gules, a mullet of 6 Or'.
	Remy	de sinople à la grande losange de gueules bordée d’or, chargée d’une quintefeuille du même, cantonnée de quatre merlettes d’argent, adossées deux à deux.	Vert, on a lozenge throughout gules fimbriated Or between 4 martlets addorsed argent, a cinqfoil Or.
	Ressons-sur-Matz	d'azur à une gerbe de blé d'or.	Azure, a garb [of wheat] Or.
	Rethondes	De gueules à la crosse d’or senestrée d’une lance de tournoi du même portant à senestre un guidon d’argent chargé d’une aigle bicéphale de sable, le tout accosté de deux fleurs de lys d’or	Gules, a crozier and a tourney lance between in base 2 fleurs-de-lys Or, the lance flying a banner argent, a 2-headed eagle sable.
	Ribécourt-Dreslincourt	accolés: au premier d’azur à la fasce d’argent accompagnée en chef de trois étoiles d’or; au second: parti d’azur à trois croisettes potencées d’argent, et de gueules à la vache aussi d’argent; le tout sommé d’un chef d’or chargé d'un chateau de sinople.	2 shields accolé: Azure, a fess argent, and in chief 3 mullets [of 5] in fess Or. and Per pale azure in pale 3 crosslets potent argent, and gules a cow argent, and on a chief Or, a castle vert.
	Rieux	Taillé d’or et d’azur	Per bend sinister Or and azure.
	Roberval	d’azur à trois rocs d’échiquier d’argent.	Azure, 3 chess rooks argent.

== S ==
Image	Name of Commune	French original blazon	English blazon
	Saint-Felix	D’or au sautoir de gueules cantonné en chef d’une étoile d’azur et en pointe, d’un cœur enflammé aussi de gueules.	Or, a saltire gules between in pale a mullet [of 5] azure and a heart enflamed gules.
	Saint-Germain-la-Poterie	De sinople au pal cousu de gueules accompagné, au canton senestre, d’une fleur de chardon tigée de feuillé de deux pièces du même, à la bande d’or brochant sur le tout, chargée de deux branches de houx feuillées de quatre pièces, fruitées de trois pièces de gueules.	Vert, a pale and in sinister canton a thistle slipped and leaved gules, overall a bend Or charged with 2 branches of holly, fructed gules.
	Saint-Germer-de-Fly	Parti au premier d’argent à la hache de sable, au second de gueules à la crosse contournée d’or; le tout sommé d’un chef d’azur chargé de trois fleurs de lys d’or	Per pale argent and gules, an ax sable and a crozier contourny Or, and on a chief azure, 3 fleurs-de-lys Or.
	Saint-Jean-aux-Bois	parti au 1 d'azur à une fleur de lys d'or; au second coupé de gueules à une porte flanquée de deux tours d'argent et de sinople à un huchet contourné d'or.	Azure, a fleur-de-lys Or impaled with Per fess, gules a gate between 2 towers argent, and vert a hunting horn contourny Or.
	Saint-Just-en-Chaussée	De gueules au chevron d'argent chargé d'un léopard de sable, accompagné en chef de deux fleurs de lys d'or et en pointe d'une gourde aussi d'argent.	Gules, on a chevron argent between 2 fleurs-de-lys Or and a gourd argent, a lion passant sable.
	Saint-Leu-d'Esserent	fascé d'argent et d'azur de six pieces, bordé de gueules.	Barry argent and azure, a bordure gules.
	Saint-Martin-Longueau	parti au premier de gueules à l’épée basse d’or, posée en bande, tranchant une toge romaine d’argent, au second de sinople à la fleur de lys accompagnée, en chef d’un peigne de chanvrier et, en pointe, d’une cliquette de lépreux, le tout d’or, posé et rangé en barre; le tout soutenu d’une champagne d’azur chargée de filets ondés de sable.	Per pale 1: gules, a sword bendwise Or cutting St. Martin's cloak argent; 2: Vert, in bend sinister a hemp comb, a fleur-de-lys and a leper's clapper all bendwise sinister Or; overall on a base azure barrulets wavy sable.
	Saint-Paul	De gueules à un pot d’argent avec un anse du même à senestre, au chef cousu d’azur chargé de trois fleurs de lys d’or.	Gules, a pot handle to sinister argent, and on a chief azure, 3 fleurs-de-lys Or.
	Salency	Parti au premier d’argent à la crosse d’évêque d’or, au second d’azur au collier en anneau de trente deux perles d’argent accompagné de deux fleurs de lys d’or l’une en chef l’autre en pointe.	Per pale argent, an episcopal crozier Or, and azure a necklace of 32 pearls argent between 2 fleurs-de-lys Or.
	Sarcus	De gueules au sautoir d’argent cantonné de quatre merlettes du même	Gules, a saltire between 4 martlets argent.
	Savignies	D’argent aux trois fasces de sable surmontées de trois merlettes du même rangées en chef	Argent, 3 fesses, and in chief 3 martlets in fess sable.
	Sempigny	tranché 1)de gueules à un château du lieu d'argent environné d'un arbre du même 2)d'argent à une rivière d'azur coulant en barre sur laquelle vogue un barque d'argent, la voile repliée, la berge plantée d'arbres d'argent.	Per bend 1: Gules, the local castle and a tree argent; 2: Argent, on a bend sinister wavy [river] azure, a boat sails furled argent, the bank planted with trees argent. ??argent trees on the argent bank??
	Senlis	de gueules au pal d'or.	Gules, a pale Or.
	Senots	parti : au premier d’argent à la croix de gueules chargée d’un cœur d’or, au second burelé d’argent et de gueules de dix pièces; à la vergette ondée d’azur brochant sur la partition; au lion de sablée armé lampassé et couronné de gueules brochant sur la burelé et sur la vergette.	Per pale 1: Argent, on a cross gules a heart Or; 2: barry argent and gules; a pallet wavy azure on the line of division; over the barry and the pallet, a lion sable armed, langed and crowned gules. ??
	Serans	D’hermine au franc quartier d’azur chargé de trois fermaux d’or	Ermine, on a canton azure, 3 buckles Or.
	Silly-Tillard	D’or à la croix ancrée d’azur accompagnée de trois maillets renversés de sable.	Or, a cross moline between 3 mallets inverted sable.
	Songeons	D’argent à trois fleurs (pensées, 2 en chef et 1 en pointe) de pourpre à la tige de sinople, avec un S d'or borduré de sable au centre	Argent 3 pansies purpure slipped vert, and in center point the letter S Or fimbriated sable.
	Suzoy	Parti : au premier d’argent à la crosse d’évêque soudée d’or, au second coupé au I d’azur à la croix de guerre d’or, et au II d’or au bouquet de trois cerises de gueules tigées et feuillées d’une pièce de sinople à senestre.	Argent, an episcopal crozier Or impaled with Per fess azure and Or, a croix de guerre Or and a bunch of 3 cherries gules, slipped and leaved vert.

== T ==
Image	Name of Commune	French original blazon	English blazon
	Tartigny	De gueules à la foi d’argent issant de deux nuées du même mouvant des flancs, soutenant trois épis de blé d’or, deux passées en sautoir et le troisième posé en pal.	Gules, a foi issuant from clouds issuant from the flanks argent, in chief 3 stalks of wheat Or, 2 in saltire, 1 palewise. (a 'foi' is basically a handshake)
	Thiers-sur-Thève	Tiercé en pairle : au 1er de gueules au château donjonné ruiné d’argent maçonné de sable, ouvert et ajouré du champ, au 2nd d’or à l’arbre de sinople posé sur une champagne ondée d’azur chargé de trois burelles ondées d’argent, au 3eme d’argent à la cognée de sable senestrée d’une scie passe-partout du même posée en pal.	Tierce per pall 1: Gules, a ruined castle with keep, open and pierced of the field; 2: Or, a tree vert on a base wavy azure charged with 3 barrulets wavy argent; 3: Argent, a lumberjack's axe and saw palewise sable.
	Thourotte	D’or au lion de sable lampassé de gueules	Or, a lion sable armed and langued gules. ('Flanders' and the communes of Thourotte, Crépy-en-Valois, Bollezeele, Feignies, Flines-lez-Raches and Wormhout use the same arms.)
	Thury-sous-Clermont	D’or a la fasce d’azur accompagnée de six étoiles du même trois rangées en chef et trois rangées en pointe.	Or, a fess between 6 mullets [of 5 points] (3,3) azure.
	Tillé	Bandé de gueules et d'or avec un lion passant dans le sens de la bande sur la 1° bande d'or.	Bendy gules and Or, a lion passant bendwise Or on the first bend.
	Tricot	D’or à trois coqs de gueules	Or, 3 cocks gules.
	Trie-Château	D'or à la bande d'azur.	Or, a bend azure. (the Trie family and the communes of Trie-Château and Vaulx use the same arms.)
	Troissereux	D'azur à la fasce ondée d'argent accompagné en chef d'une rose d'or boutonnée de gueules accostée de deux fleurs de lys aussi d'or, et en pointe de trois gerbes de blé rangées aussi d'or.	Azure, a fess wavy argent, in chief a rose Or seeded gules between 2 fleurs-de-lys, in base 3 garbs in fess Or.
	Troussures	De gueules à la fasce d’argent chargée de trois merlettes de sable.	Gules, on a fess argent, 3 martlets sable.
	Trumilly	D'or à trois trefles de sinople.	Or, 3 trefoils vert.

== V ==
Image	Name of Commune	French original blazon	English blazon
	Varesnes	D’or à la fasce de sable accompagnée de trois tréfles de sinople deux en chef et un en pointe	Or, a fess sable between 3 trefoils vert.
	Vaudancourt	Ecartelé au 1) de sable à l’église du lieu d’argent ajourée du champ, au 2) de gueules à la tête humaine au poil levé d’or, au 3) fuselé d’argent et de gueules, au 4) d’or aux trois fasces de sable.	Quarterly 1: Sable, the local church argent pierced of the field; 2: Gules, a human head with raised hair Or; 3: Fusilly argent and gules; and 4:Or, 3 fesses sable.
	Venette	Parti: au premier coupé au 1 d’azur au livre au naturel surmonté de deux étoiles de sable et au 2 d’argent au moulin à vent d’azur, au second de gueules à la fasce ondée d’argent, en chef un ancre d’or et en pointe un palme du même posée en barre	Per fess azure and argent, a book proper and in chief 2 mullets [of 5] sable, and a windmill azure impaled with Gules, a fess wavy argent between an anchor and a palm branch bendwise sinister Or.
	Verberie	d'azur à la tour donjonnée d'argent, maçonnée et ajourée de sable, accompagnée de cinq fleurs de lys d'or ordonnées 2, 2 et 1 (Croix de guerre 1914-1918)	Azure, a tower with keep argent masoned and pierced sable, between 5 fleurs-de-lys Or 2,2,1.
	Verneuil-en-Halatte	d'azur aux trois fleurs de lys d'or accompagnées, en abîme, d'un bâton péri de gueules en barre.	Azure, 3 fleurs-de-lys Or and in center point a bendlet sinister couped gules.
	Vieux-Moulin	coupé : au premier de sinople à la roue de moulin d'or accompagnée, aux cantons, de deux fleurs de lys du même, au second d'argent aux trois fasces ondées d'azur (Croix de guerre 1914-1918)	Per fess vert and argent, a millwheel and in chief 2 fleurs-de-lys Or, and 3 fesses wavy azure.
	Villers-Saint-Sépulcre	D'or à une croix de gueules, au chef d'azur	Or, a cross gules, and a chief azure.
	Villers-Saint-Paul	d'argent à la bande de sable chargée de trois fleurs de lys d'or.	Argent, on a bend sable, 3 fleurs-de-lys Or.
	Villers-sous-Saint-Leu	D’azur au sautoir d’argent cantonné de quatre fleurs de lys du même	Azure, a saltire between 4 fleurs-de-lys argent.
	Villers-sur-Trie	D’argent à la croix pattée de gueules surmontée de deux quintefeuilles du même rangées en chef, à la bordure de sinople.	Argent, a cross patty, and in chief 2 cinqfoils gules, all within a bordure vert.

== W ==
Image	Name of Commune	French original blazon	English blazon
	Wavignies	d'argent au filet de peche de sable posé en fasce accompagné de 7 merlette du même quatre en chef et trois en pointe.	Argent, a 'fishing net sable' (as a fess) between 7 martlets sable (4,2,1). (One could blazon this Argent, a fess chequy argent and argent...
