= Sacy =

Sacy may refer to:

People

- Claude-Louis-Michel de Sacy (1746-94), French politician
- Jacques Silvestre de Sacy (1896-1993), French civil servant
- Louis de Sacy (1654-1727), French author and lawyer
- Louis-Isaac Lemaistre de Sacy (1613-84), French theologian and humanist
- Silvestre de Sacy (1758-1838), French linguist and orientalist
- Ustazade Silvestre de Sacy (1801-79), French journalist.

Places (all of which are communes in France)

- Sacy, Marne, in the Marne département
- Sacy, Yonne, in the Yonne département
- Sacy-le-Grand, in the Oise département
- Sacy-le-Petit, in the Oise département

Other uses

- Sacy (grape), a French wine grape
