= Ognon, Oise =

Ognon
- Part of Villers-Saint-Frambourg-Ognon
- Location of Ognon
- Location within France Location within Hauts-de-France
- Coordinates: 49°14′14″N 2°38′39″E
- Country: France
- Region: Hauts-de-France
- Department: Oise
- Arrondissement: Senlis
- Canton: Pont-Sainte-Maxence
- Commune: Villers-Saint-Frambourg-Ognon
- Area^{1}: 4.82 km^{2} (1.86 sq mi)
- Elevation: 90 m (300 ft)
- Highest elevation: 106 m (348 ft)
- Lowest elevation: 63 m (207 ft)
- Population (2019): 157
  - Density: 32.6/km^{2} (84.4/sq mi)
- Time zone: UTC+01:00 (CET)
  - Summer (DST): UTC+02:00 (CEST)
- Postal code: 60810
- ^{1} French Land Register data, which excludes lakes, ponds, glaciers > 1 km^{2} (0.386 sq mi or 247 acres) and river estuaries.

Ognon (French pronunciation: [ɔɲɔ̃]) is a former commune in the Oise department in northern France. On 1 January 2019, it was merged into the new commune Villers-Saint-Frambourg-Ognon.

== See also ==
- Communes of the Oise department
