= Villers-Saint-Frambourg-Ognon =

- Commune
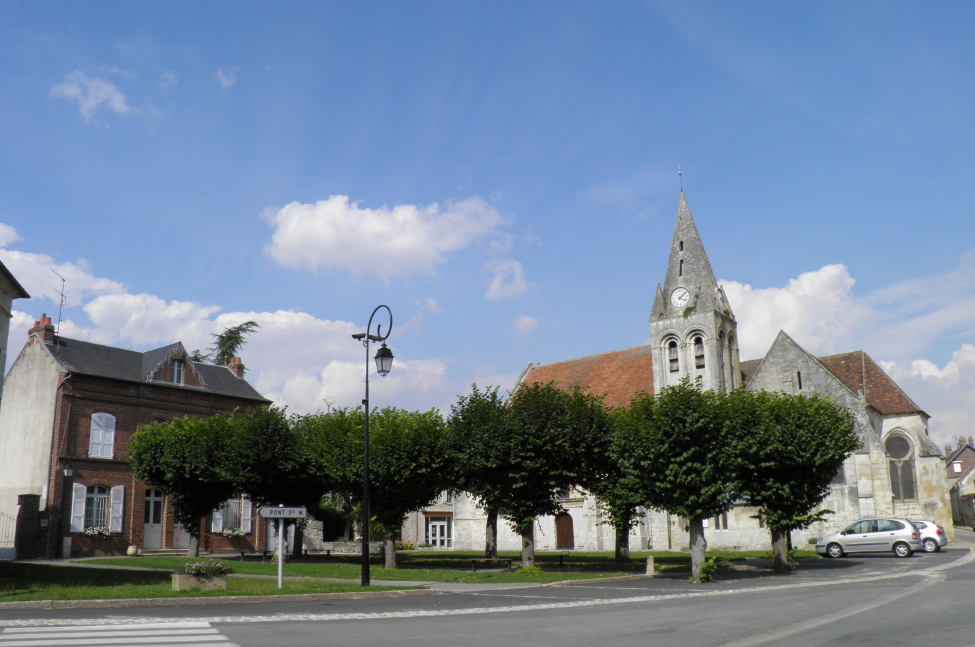
- The main square in Villers-Saint-Frambourg
- Location of Villers-Saint-Frambourg-Ognon
- Location within France Location within Hauts-de-France
- Coordinates: 49°15′21″N 2°38′24″E
- Country: France
- Region: Hauts-de-France
- Department: Oise
- Arrondissement: Senlis
- Canton: Pont-Sainte-Maxence
- Intercommunality: Senlis Sud Oise

Government
  - Mayor (2020–2026): Laurent Nocton
- Area^{1}: 14.54 km^{2} (5.61 sq mi)
- Highest elevation: 215 m (705 ft)
- Lowest elevation: 63 m (207 ft)
- Population (2023): 726
  - Density: 49.9/km^{2} (129/sq mi)
- Time zone: UTC+01:00 (CET)
  - Summer (DST): UTC+02:00 (CEST)
- INSEE/Postal code: 60682 /60810
- ^{1} French Land Register data, which excludes lakes, ponds, glaciers > 1 km^{2} (0.386 sq mi or 247 acres) and river estuaries.

Villers-Saint-Frambourg-Ognon (French pronunciation: [vilɛʁ sɛ̃ fʁɑ̃buʁ ɔɲɔ̃]) is a commune in the northern French department of Oise. It was established on 1 January 2019 by merger of the former communes of Villers-Saint-Frambourg (the seat) and Ognon.

== See also ==
- Communes of the Oise department
