= Communauté de communes des Pays d'Oise et d'Halatte =

Federation of municipalities in France

Pays d'Oise et d'Halatte
- Communauté de communes
- Country: France
- Region: Hauts-de-France
- Department: Oise
- No. of communes: {{{nbcomm}}}
- Established: 1997

Government
  - President: Arnaud Dumontier
- Area: 139.47 km^{2} (53.85 sq mi)
- Population (2018): 34,240
  - Density: 245.5/km^{2} (635.8/sq mi)

The Communauté de communes des Pays d'Oise et d'Halatte is a communauté de communes located in the Oise département and in the Hauts-de-France région of France. It was created in December 1997 and its seat is Pont-Sainte-Maxence. It includes 17 communes with a population of about 34,000 inhabitants.

== Territory ==
The communauté de communes is located in the heart of the Oise valley, 60 km north from Paris, between Creil and Compiègne, 6 km away from the A1 highway and 40 km away from the Charles De Gaulle airport.

About half of its territory is located within the scope of the Parc naturel régional Oise-Pays de France, and seven of its municipalities are located on the river Oise.

The territory, with an area of 139.5 km^{2}, had a population of 34,240 in 2018.

=== Composition ===
The communauté de communes consists of the following 17 communes:

- Les Ageux
- Angicourt
- Bazicourt
- Beaurepaire
- Brenouille
- Cinqueux
- Monceaux
- Pontpoint
- Pont-Sainte-Maxence
- Rhuis
- Rieux
- Roberval
- Sacy-Le-Petit
- Sacy-Le-Grand
- Saint-Martin-Longueau
- Verneuil-en-Halatte
- Villeneuve-sur-Verberie

== See also ==
- Communes of the Oise department
