= Cinqueux =

- Commune
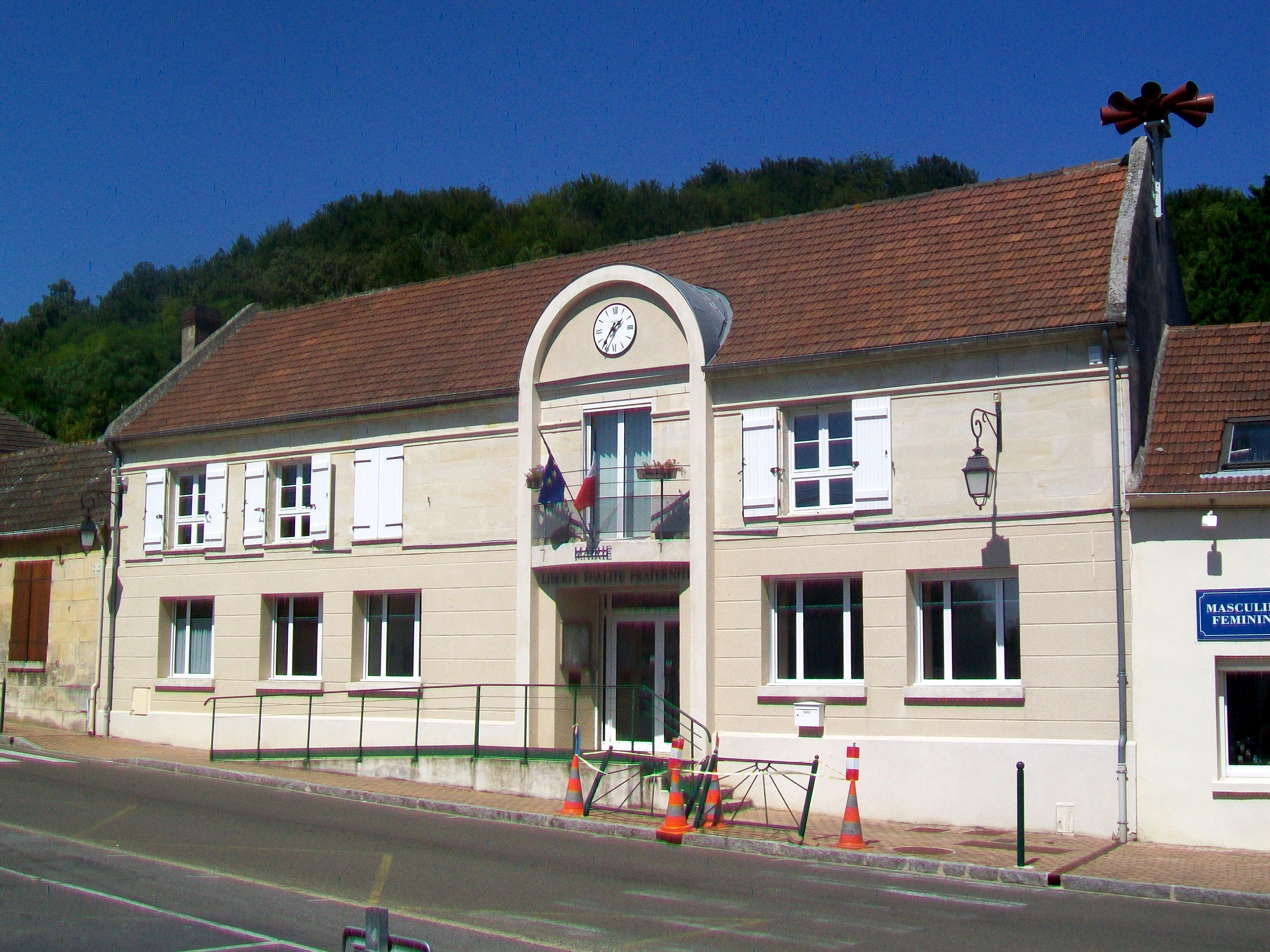
- The new town hall in Cinqueux

- Coat of arms
- Location of Cinqueux
- Location within France Location within Hauts-de-France
- Coordinates: 49°19′10″N 2°31′39″E
- Country: France
- Region: Hauts-de-France
- Department: Oise
- Arrondissement: Clermont
- Canton: Pont-Sainte-Maxence
- Intercommunality: CC Pays d'Oise et d'Halatte

Government
  - Mayor (2020–2026): Philippe Barbillon
- Area^{1}: 6.79 km^{2} (2.62 sq mi)
- Elevation: 78 m (256 ft)
- Highest elevation: 118 m (387 ft)
- Lowest elevation: 31 m (102 ft)
- Population (2023): 1,630
  - Density: 240/km^{2} (622/sq mi)
- Demonym: Cinquatien(ne)
- Time zone: UTC+01:00 (CET)
  - Summer (DST): UTC+02:00 (CEST)
- INSEE/Postal code: 60154 /60940
- Website: www.cinqueux.fr
- ^{1} French Land Register data, which excludes lakes, ponds, glaciers > 1 km^{2} (0.386 sq mi or 247 acres) and river estuaries.

Cinqueux (French pronunciation: [sɛ̃kø]) is a commune in the Oise department in northern France. The residents of Cinqueux are called Cinquatiens and Cinquatiennes. Cinqueux has a population of 1 541 as of 2016, an estimate from the National Institute of Statistics ad Economic Studies Insee.

== Geography ==
Cinqueux is located in the Hauts-de-France region approximately 66 kilometres (41 miles) from Amiens, 34 kilometres (21 miles) from Beauvais and 52 kilometres (32 miles) from Paris.

== Government and politics ==
The town is located in the arrondissement of Clermont of the department of Oise since 1942. It his part of the 7th constituency of Oise since 1988. From 1793 to 2014, it was part of the canton of Liancourt, except from October 15, 1801 to February 22, 1802, during which it was attached to the canton of Mouy. After the cantonal redistribution in 2014, the town is now attached to the canton of Pont-Sainte-Maxence.

=== Intercommunality ===
Cinqueux is part of the communauté de communes des pays d'Oise et d'Halatte created in January 1998.

=== Mayors ===
Term start	Term end	Mayor
1900	1907	Gaston Guerlin
1907	1908	Charles Tribout
1908	1911	Eugène Duvivier
1911	1919	Camille Morelle
1919	1935	Charles Tainturier
1935	1941	Henri Commien
1941	1942	Marcel Morot
1942	1944	Pierre Gires
1944	1945	Lucien Roussillon
1945	1947	Henri Fouan
1947	1953	Roger Bertrand
1953	1977	André Cocu
1977	2001	Raymond Moriconi
2001	2008	Marc Teinturier
2008	2014	Bernard Fricker
2014	incumbent	Philippe Barbillon

== See also ==
- Communes of the Oise department
