= Brenouille =

- Commune
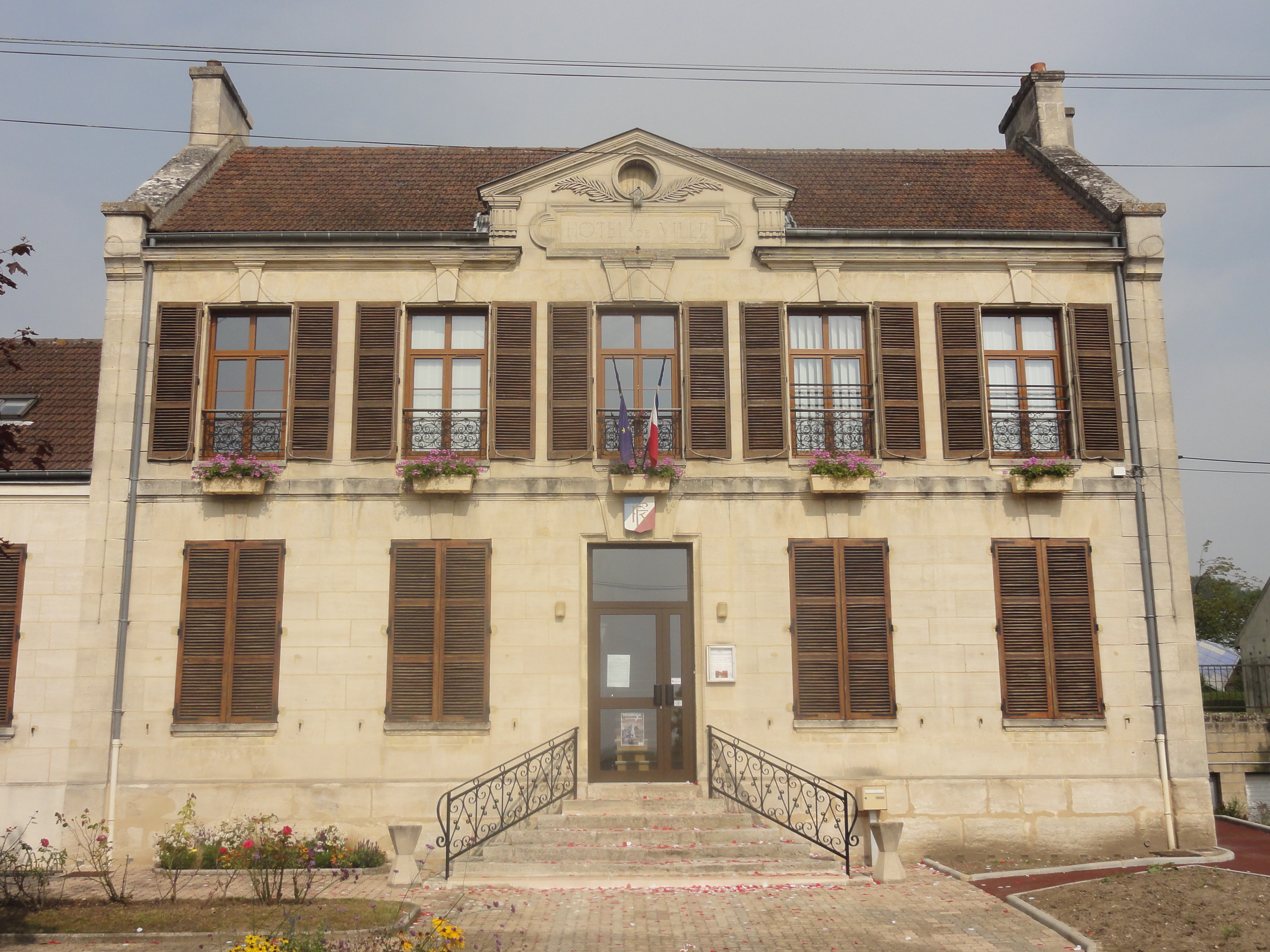
- The town hall in Brenouille
- Location of Brenouille
- Location within France Location within Hauts-de-France
- Coordinates: 49°18′13″N 2°32′07″E
- Country: France
- Region: Hauts-de-France
- Department: Oise
- Arrondissement: Clermont
- Canton: Pont-Sainte-Maxence
- Intercommunality: CC Pays d'Oise et d'Halatte

Government
  - Mayor (2020–2026): Khristine Foyart
- Area^{1}: 4.31 km^{2} (1.66 sq mi)
- Elevation: 31 m (102 ft)
- Highest elevation: 108 m (354 ft)
- Lowest elevation: 27 m (89 ft)
- Population (2023): 2,105
  - Density: 488/km^{2} (1,260/sq mi)
- Time zone: UTC+01:00 (CET)
  - Summer (DST): UTC+02:00 (CEST)
- INSEE/Postal code: 60102 /60870
- ^{1} French Land Register data, which excludes lakes, ponds, glaciers > 1 km^{2} (0.386 sq mi or 247 acres) and river estuaries.

Brenouille (French pronunciation: [bʁənuj]) is a commune in the Oise department in northern France.

== Population ==
Historical population

Year	Pop.	±% p.a.
1793	218	—
1821	246	+0.43%
1846	197	−0.88%
1872	186	−0.22%
1901	208	+0.39%
1926	268	+1.02%
1946	257	−0.21%
1962	356	+2.06%
1968	374	+0.83%

Year	Pop.	±% p.a.
1975	428	+1.95%
1982	860	+10.48%
1990	1,843	+10.00%
1999	2,223	+2.10%
2007	2,163	−0.34%
2012	2,104	−0.55%
2017	2,016	−0.85%
2023	2,105	+0.72%

Source: EHESS and INSEE (1968-2023)

== See also ==
- Communes of the Oise department
