= Maxentia of Beauvais =

Saint Maxentia of Beauvais
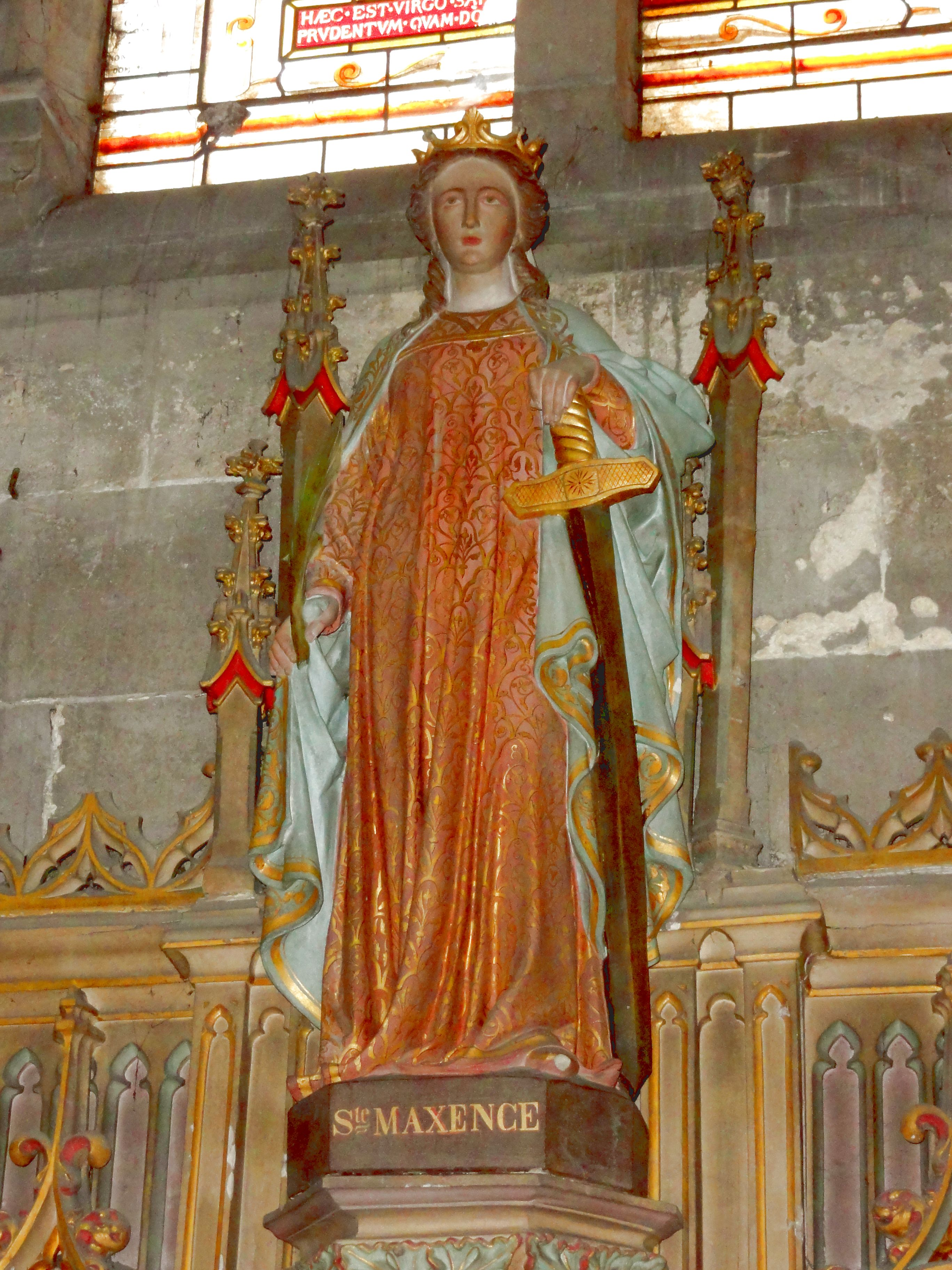
- Statue of Maxentia in Sainte-Maxence de Pont-Sainte-Maxence

Virgin martyr
- Born: Ireland
- Died: 5th century Pont-Sainte-Maxence, France
- Canonized: Pre-congregation
- Feast: 20 November

Maxentia of Beauvais (French: Sainte Maxence) was a 5th-century Irish virgin and hermit who was beheaded when she refused to marry. Her feast day is 20 November.

== Life ==
Maxentia of Beauvais was born in Ireland or Scotland, but fled to France to avoid being married to a pagan chieftain. She lived beside the Oise River near Senlis in the Diocese of Beauvais. The pagan chieftain tracked her down, and killed her at Pont-Sainte-Maxence when she refused to marry him.

== Monks of Ramsgate account ==
The Monks of Ramsgate wrote in their Book of Saints (1921),

Maxentia (St.) V.M. (Nov 20)
(5th cent.) According to tradition, an Irish Recluse, living near Senlis in France, where she suffered martyrdom. But the particulars are lost or uncertain..

== Butler's account ==
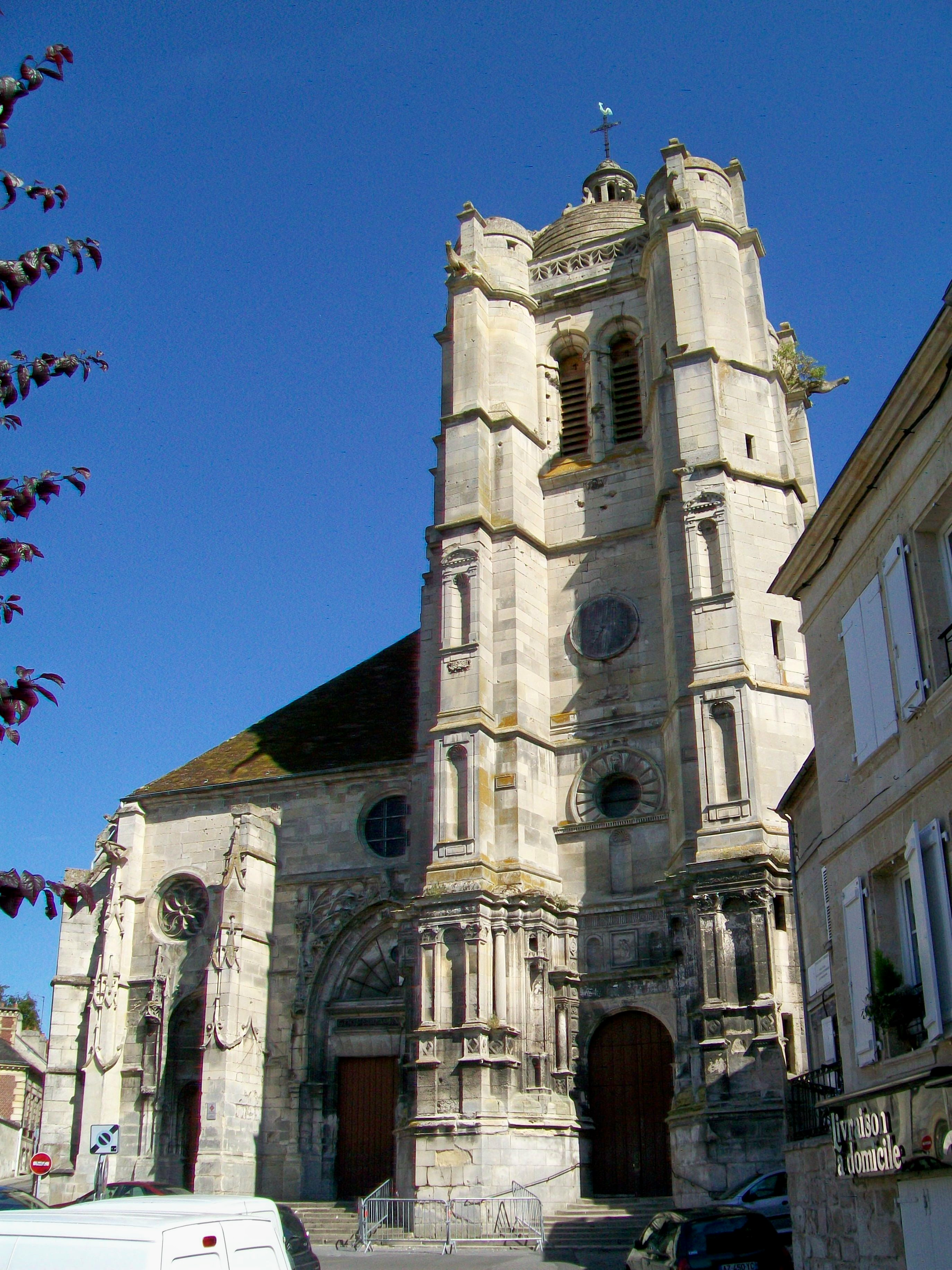
Église Sainte-Maxence in Pont-Sainte-Maxence

The hagiographer Alban Butler ( 1710–1773) wrote in his Lives of the Fathers, Martyrs, and Other Principal Saints, under November 20,

St. Maxentia of Ireland, Virgin and Martyr

This saint was a Scottish, or rather Irish lady, and is said to have been of royal extraction. To preserve her virginity, which she had consecrated to God by vow, she retired into France, where she lived a recluse near the river Oise, two leagues from Senlis. She was pursued, discovered, and murdered by a child of Belial who had not been able to shake her virtuous resolution. One of the continuators of Fredegarius mentions in the seventh century her veneration at the passage of the Oise, which town is, from her precious relics which are honoured there, called Pont-Sainte-Maxence. Her festival was kept in Ireland and England on the 24th of October: in some places in England on the 16th of April, to which Wilson transfers it in the second edition of his English Martyrology: in Scotland, and in the diocess of Beauvais, it is celebrated on the 20th of November, as appears from the Breviaries of Aberdeen and Beauvais. See Henschenius, t. 2. Apr. p. 402.

== Horstmann's account ==
Carl Horstmann reproduced a life of the saint from MS. Stowe 949, written about 1615.

The life of St. Maxentia Virgin and Martyr

Maxentia was daughter to the king of Scots named MARCOLANE. By nature's gift she was of rare beauty, and by gods grace, as comely for the love of all virtue and zeal of virginity. A pagan Prince and a Barbarian by grew vehemently in love of her, and for satisfying his suit and desire, had obtained of her father a promise of her in marriage. The chaste virgin hearing that, and fearing least she might be barred from keeping her self pure and undefiled unto Christ only: After that she had earnestly commended her case unto god by many prayers, taking an old man named BARBANCIUS, and a maid attendant on her called ROSOBEA for companions, she flies thence and gets her into France: where in a village of BEAUVAISE she lay secretly with her two fellows, serving god in all duty and devotion. The promised husband and lover, understanding that she was fled pursued after with all speed and diligence, directing every way messengers, to harken and espy her out: who did their endeavor so effectually, that at length they found her. The enamored Prince came to her, and labored all he could to provoke her like carnal affection and assent unto him, as he bore unto her, and to return home with him to temporal joy and glory. But she had so fixed her love and heart on the glorious king Christ Jesus, that all those labors were lost on her: all carnal worth seeming to her vile and so base as unworthy wholly to be balanced or weighed with so supreme a Prince, and so stable and perfect glory. The earthly lord disdaining that his hot flame should be dashed with so cold regard, his love turned into such fury, that he slew with his own hands both her and her companions, and so away he went. It is written that when he was gone, the virgin took up her head in her own arms out of the place where it was cut of, and carried it to the place where it now lies: where afterward there was a Church erected, and God glorified his loving spouse with miraculous wonders. Charles that was then king is said to have much affected that holy Virgin, and thereupon honored her sacred corps with sundry royal gifts.

== Sources ==
- Butler, Alban (1833), The Lives of the Fathers, Martyrs, and Other Principal Saints: Compiled from Original Monuments and Other Authentic Records, Illustrated with the Remarks of Judicious Modern Critics and Historians, vol. VII, R. Coyne This article incorporates text from this source, which is in the public domain.
- Horstmann, Carl (1886), The Lives of Women Saints of Our Contrie of England: Also Some Other Lives of Holie Women Written by Some of the Auncient Fathers (c. 1610-1615), Early English Text Society This article incorporates text from this source, which is in the public domain.
- St. Augustine's Abbey, Ramsgate (1921). The Book of saints : a dictionary of servants of God canonized by the Catholic Church. London: A. & C. Black, ltd. OCLC 671676136. This article incorporates text from this source, which is in the public domain.
- "St. Maxentia of Beauvais", Catholic Online, Your Catholic Voice Foundation
