= Brasseuse =

- Commune
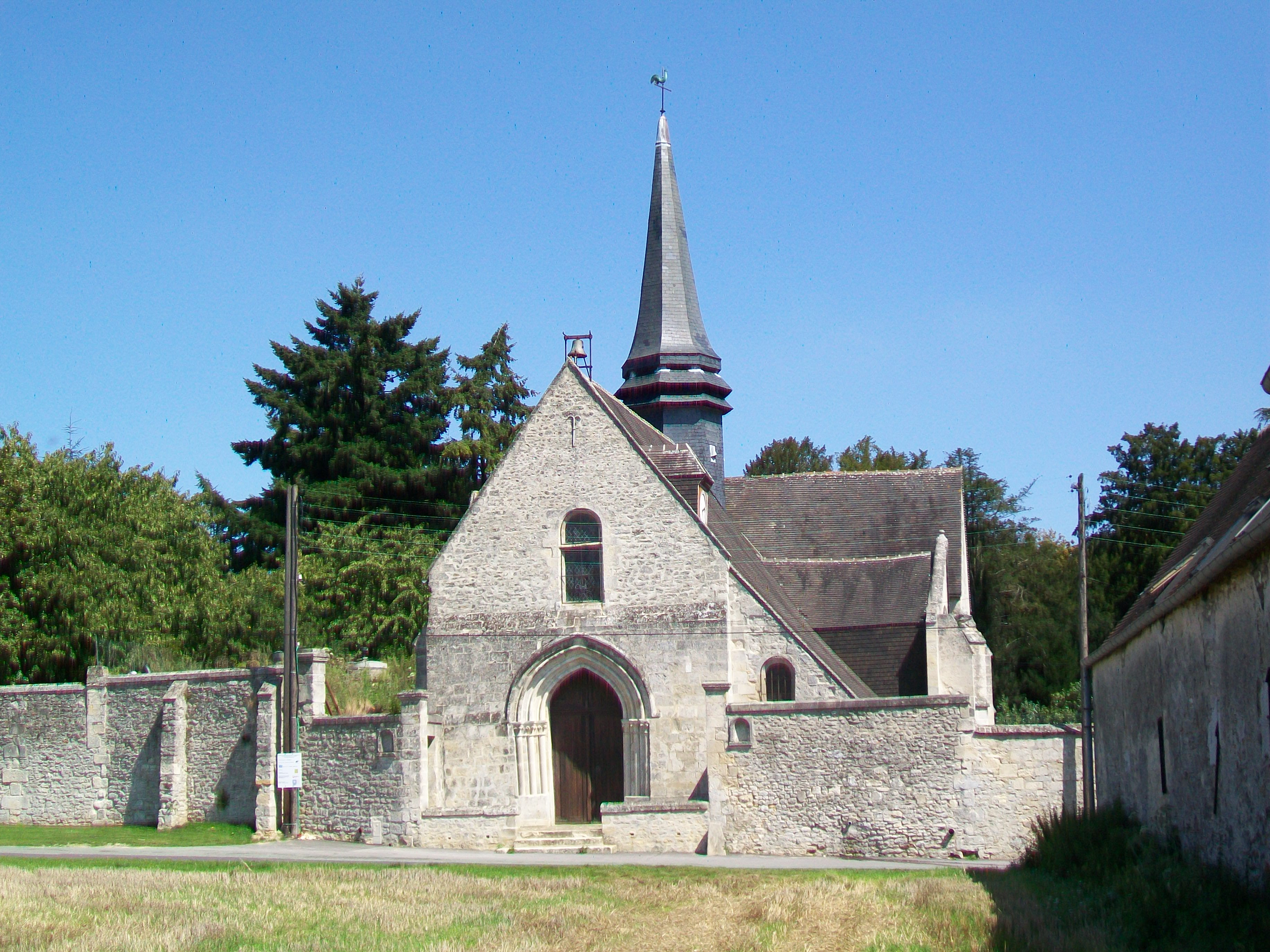
- The church in Brasseuse
- Location of Brasseuse
- Location within France Location within Hauts-de-France
- Coordinates: 49°15′26″N 2°40′56″E
- Country: France
- Region: Hauts-de-France
- Department: Oise
- Arrondissement: Senlis
- Canton: Pont-Sainte-Maxence
- Intercommunality: Senlis Sud Oise

Government
  - Mayor (2020–2026): Maxime Acciai
- Area^{1}: 8.3 km^{2} (3.2 sq mi)
- Elevation: 104 m (341 ft)
- Highest elevation: 152 m (499 ft)
- Lowest elevation: 75 m (246 ft)
- Population (2023): 110
  - Density: 13/km^{2} (34/sq mi)
- Time zone: UTC+01:00 (CET)
  - Summer (DST): UTC+02:00 (CEST)
- INSEE/Postal code: 60100 /60810
- ^{1} French Land Register data, which excludes lakes, ponds, glaciers > 1 km^{2} (0.386 sq mi or 247 acres) and river estuaries.

Brasseuse (French pronunciation: [bʁasøz]) is a commune in the Oise department in northern France.

== Population ==
Historical population
Year	Pop.	±% p.a.
1968	181	—
1975	133	−4.31%
1982	119	−1.58%
1990	152	+3.11%
1999	136	−1.23%
2007	120	−1.55%
2012	82	−7.33%
2017	107	+5.47%
2023	110	+0.46%
Source: INSEE

== See also ==
- Communes of the Oise department
