= Beaurepaire, Oise =

Beaurepaire
- Commune
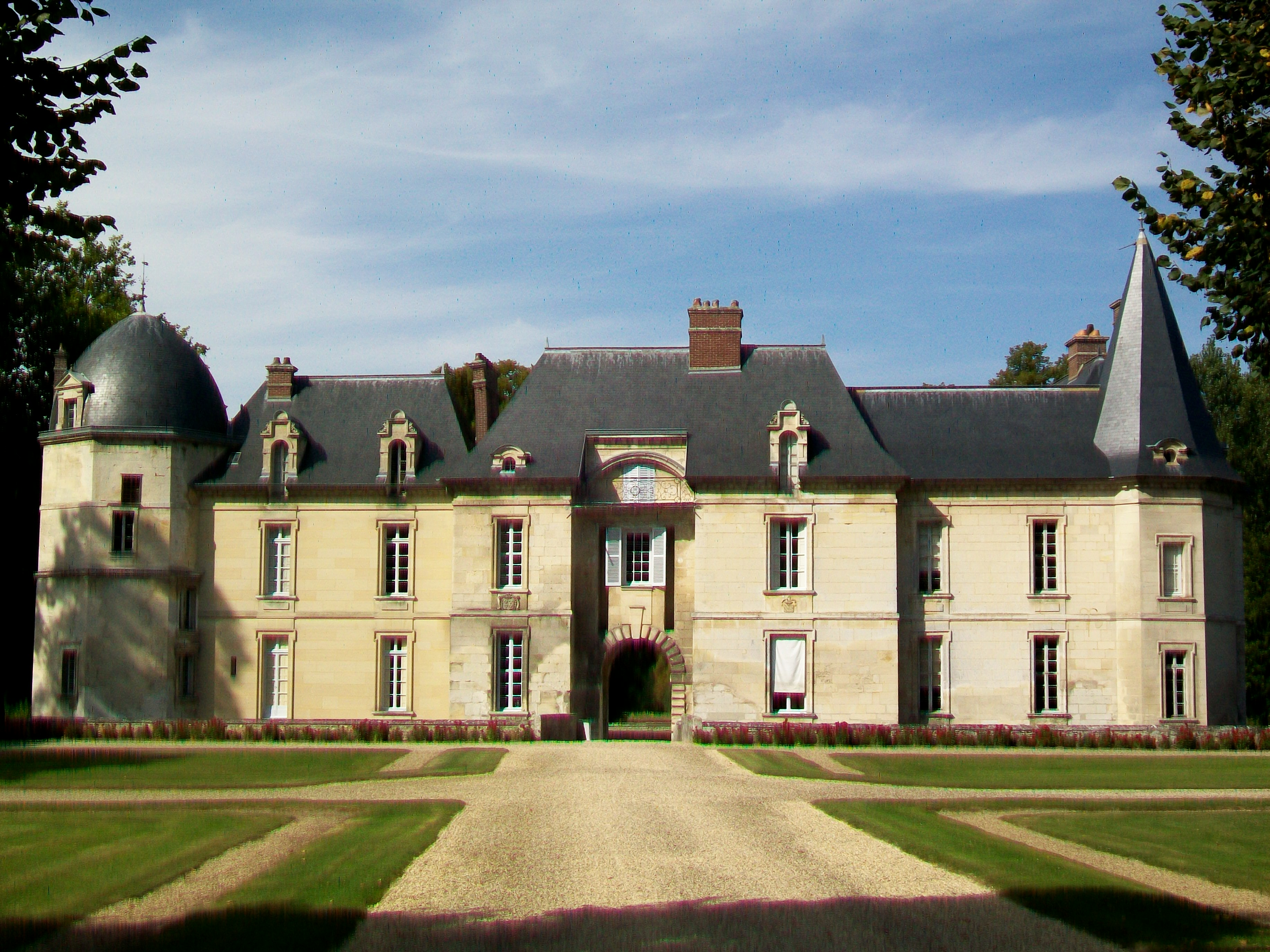
- The chateau in Beaurepaire

- Coat of arms
- Location of Beaurepaire
- Location within France Location within Hauts-de-France
- Coordinates: 49°17′40″N 2°34′20″E
- Country: France
- Region: Hauts-de-France
- Department: Oise
- Arrondissement: Senlis
- Canton: Pont-Sainte-Maxence
- Intercommunality: CC Pays d'Oise et d'Halatte

Government
  - Mayor (2020–2026): Patricia Leysens
- Area^{1}: 5.07 km^{2} (1.96 sq mi)
- Elevation: 32 m (105 ft)
- Highest elevation: 108 m (354 ft)
- Lowest elevation: 28 m (92 ft)
- Population (2023): 63
  - Density: 12/km^{2} (32/sq mi)
- Time zone: UTC+01:00 (CET)
  - Summer (DST): UTC+02:00 (CEST)
- INSEE/Postal code: 60056 /60700
- ^{1} French Land Register data, which excludes lakes, ponds, glaciers > 1 km^{2} (0.386 sq mi or 247 acres) and river estuaries.

Beaurepaire (French pronunciation: [boʁpɛʁ]) is a commune in the Oise department in northern France.

== Population ==
Historical population
Year	Pop.	±% p.a.
1968	91	—
1975	84	−1.14%
1982	70	−2.57%
1990	74	+0.70%
1999	67	−1.10%
2007	59	−1.58%
2012	59	+0.00%
2017	67	+2.58%
2023	63	−1.02%
Source: INSEE

== See also ==
- Communes of the Oise department
