= Angicourt =

- Commune
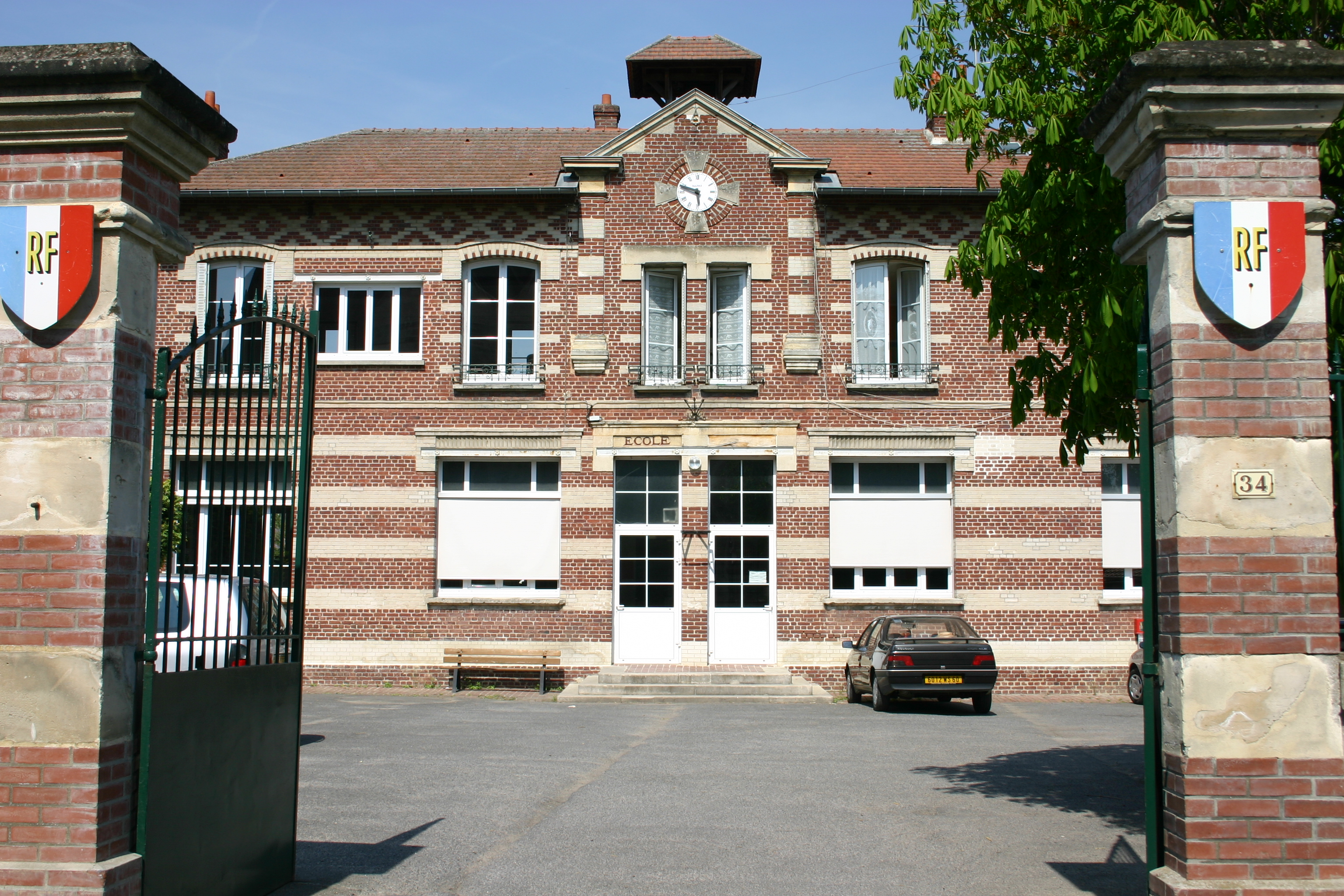
- The town hall in Angicourt
- Location of Angicourt
- Location within France Location within Hauts-de-France
- Coordinates: 49°18′45″N 2°30′16″E
- Country: France
- Region: Hauts-de-France
- Department: Oise
- Arrondissement: Clermont
- Canton: Pont-Sainte-Maxence
- Intercommunality: CC Pays d'Oise et d'Halatte

Government
  - Mayor (2020–2026): Michel Delagrange
- Area^{1}: 4.96 km^{2} (1.92 sq mi)
- Highest elevation: 120 m (390 ft)
- Lowest elevation: 38 m (125 ft)
- Population (2023): 1,345
  - Density: 271/km^{2} (702/sq mi)
- Time zone: UTC+01:00 (CET)
  - Summer (DST): UTC+02:00 (CEST)
- INSEE/Postal code: 60013 /60940
- ^{1} French Land Register data, which excludes lakes, ponds, glaciers > 1 km^{2} (0.386 sq mi or 247 acres) and river estuaries.

Angicourt (French pronunciation: [ɑ̃ʒikuʁ]) is a commune in the Oise department in northern France.

== Population ==
Historical population
Year	Pop.	±% p.a.
1968	969	—
1975	1,363	+4.99%
1982	1,495	+1.33%
1990	1,538	+0.36%
1999	1,525	−0.09%
2007	1,651	+1.00%
2012	1,547	−1.29%
2017	1,396	−2.03%
2023	1,345	−0.62%
Source: INSEE

== See also ==
- Communes of the Oise department
