= Pont-Sainte-Maxence station =

Railway station in Les Ageux, France

Coordinates: 49°18′34″N 2°36′9″E

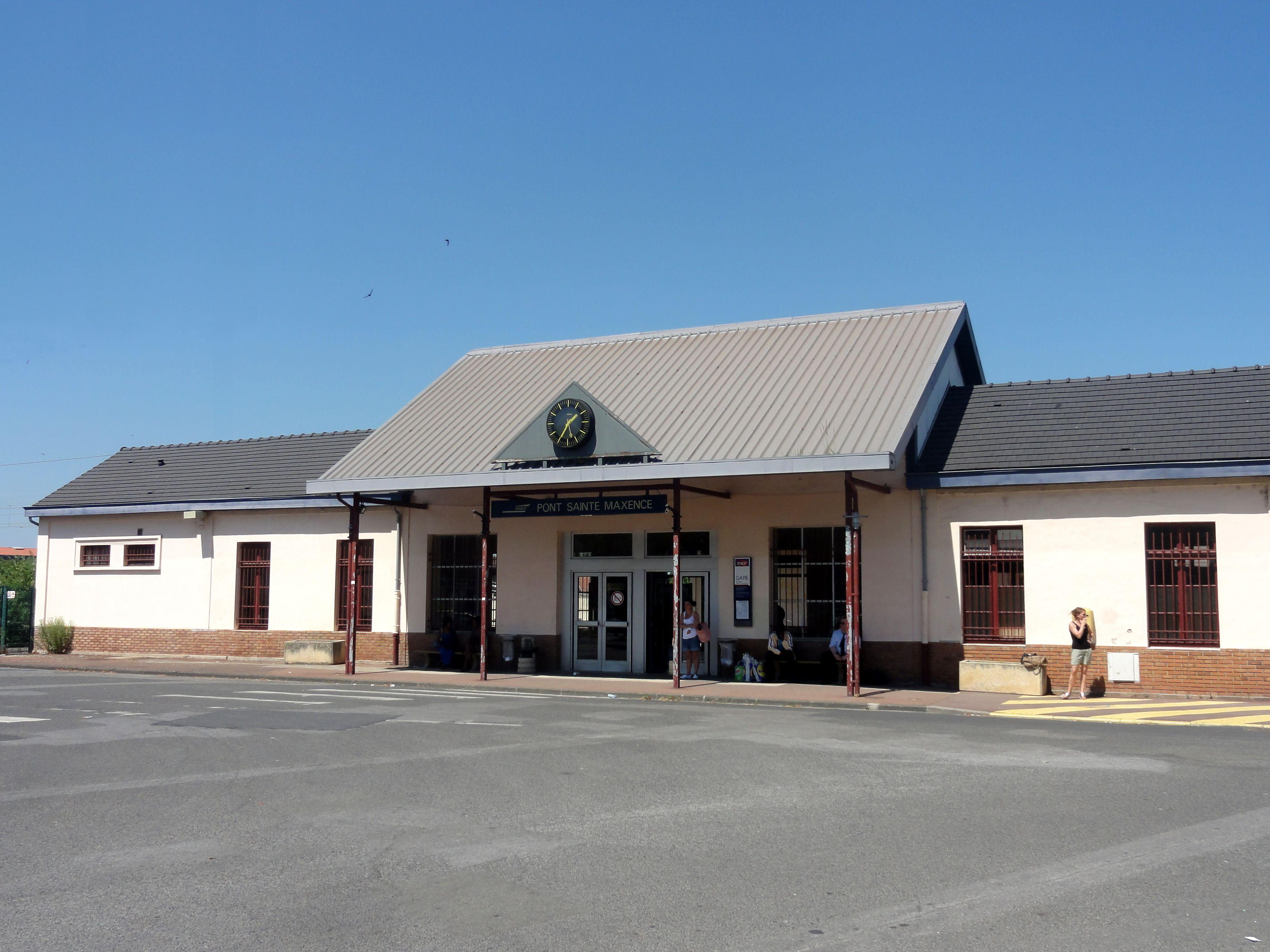
Pont-Sainte-Maxence station

Pont-Sainte-Maxence is a railway station serving the town Pont-Sainte-Maxence, Oise department, northern France. It is situated on the Creil–Jeumont railway.

== Services ==
The station is served by regional trains to Creil, Compiègne and Paris.

Preceding station	TER Hauts-de-France	Following station
Compiègne towards Saint-Quentin	Krono K14	Creil towards Paris-Nord
Chevrières towards Compiègne	Citi C14	Rieux-Angicourt towards Paris-Nord
