= Monceaux =

- Commune
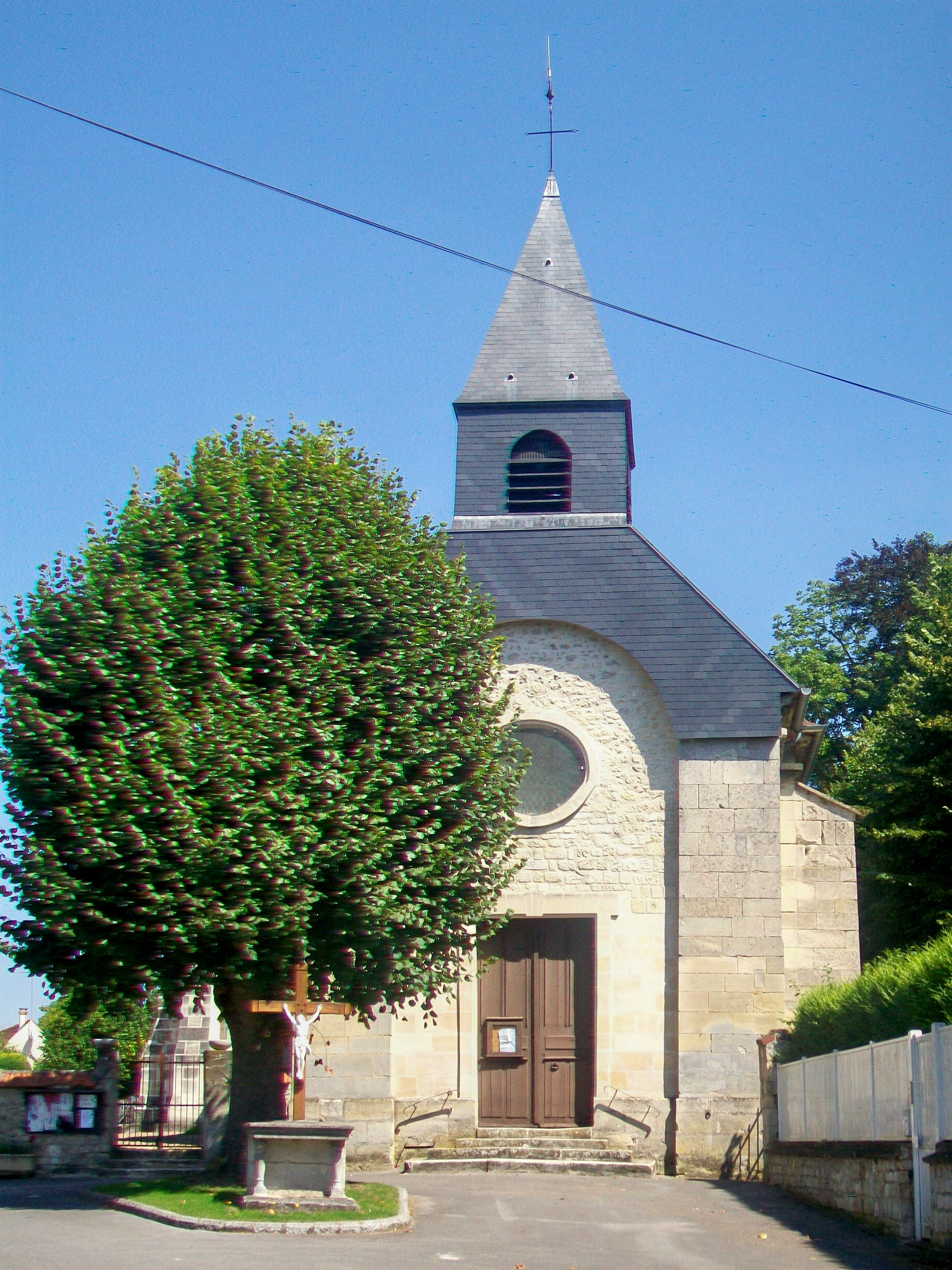
- The church in Monceaux
- Location of Monceaux
- Location within France Location within Hauts-de-France
- Coordinates: 49°19′12″N 2°33′04″E
- Country: France
- Region: Hauts-de-France
- Department: Oise
- Arrondissement: Clermont
- Canton: Pont-Sainte-Maxence
- Intercommunality: CC Pays d'Oise et d'Halatte

Government
  - Mayor (2020–2026): Térésa Dias
- Area^{1}: 6.6 km^{2} (2.5 sq mi)
- Elevation: 49 m (161 ft)
- Highest elevation: 65 m (213 ft)
- Lowest elevation: 29 m (95 ft)
- Population (2023): 947
  - Density: 140/km^{2} (370/sq mi)
- Time zone: UTC+01:00 (CET)
  - Summer (DST): UTC+02:00 (CEST)
- INSEE/Postal code: 60406 /60940
- ^{1} French Land Register data, which excludes lakes, ponds, glaciers > 1 km^{2} (0.386 sq mi or 247 acres) and river estuaries.

Monceaux (French pronunciation: [mɔ̃so]) is a commune in the Oise department in northern France.

== See also ==
- Communes of the Oise department
