= Rhuis =

- Commune
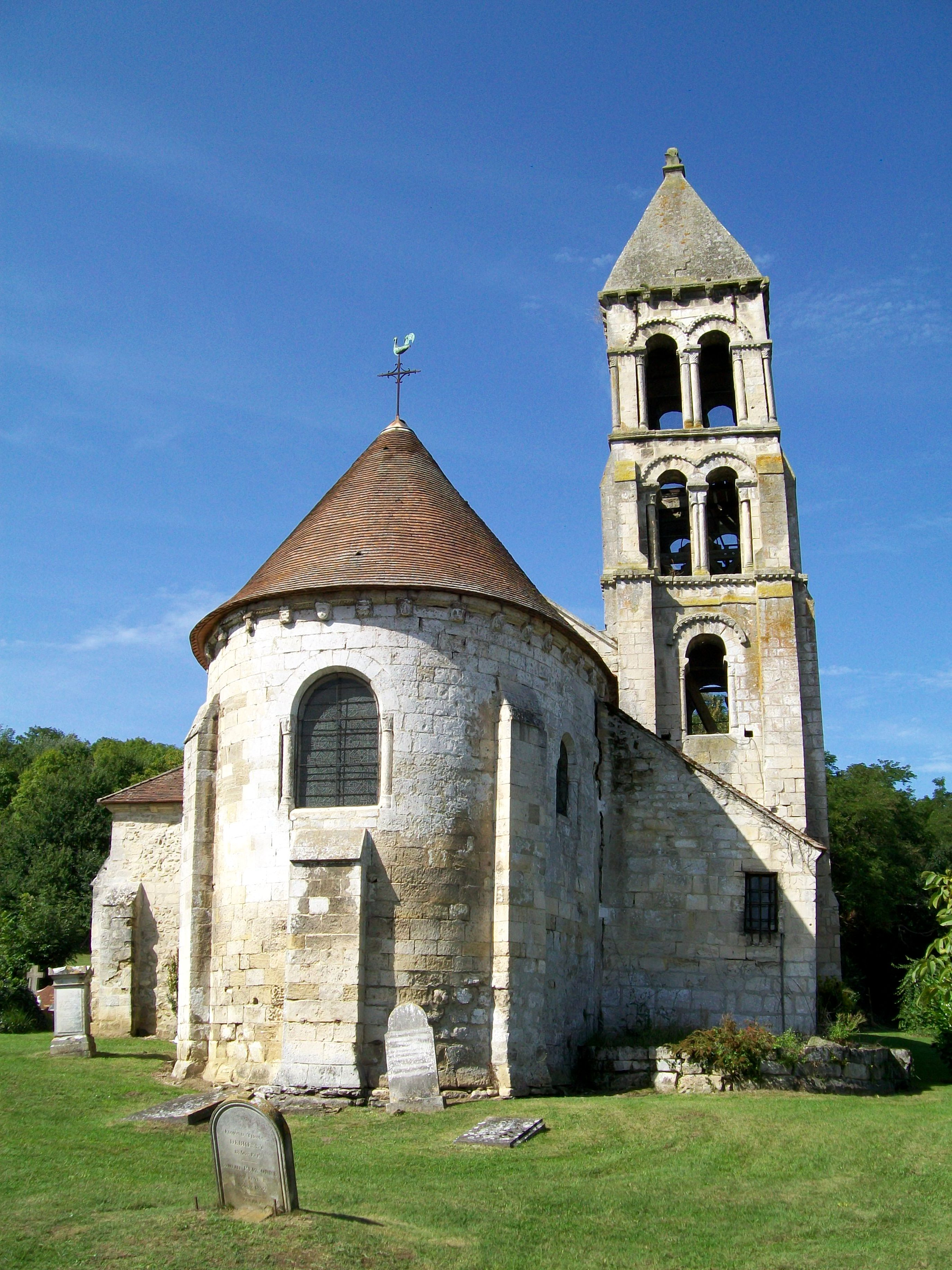
- The church in Rhuis
- Location of Rhuis
- Location within France Location within Hauts-de-France
- Coordinates: 49°18′28″N 2°41′55″E
- Country: France
- Region: Hauts-de-France
- Department: Oise
- Arrondissement: Senlis
- Canton: Pont-Sainte-Maxence
- Intercommunality: CC Pays d'Oise et d'Halatte

Government
  - Mayor (2024–2026): Xavier Bernard
- Area^{1}: 2.7 km^{2} (1.0 sq mi)
- Elevation: 51 m (167 ft)
- Highest elevation: 120 m (390 ft)
- Lowest elevation: 30 m (98 ft)
- Population (2023): 134
  - Density: 50/km^{2} (130/sq mi)
- Time zone: UTC+01:00 (CET)
  - Summer (DST): UTC+02:00 (CEST)
- INSEE/Postal code: 60536 /60410
- ^{1} French Land Register data, which excludes lakes, ponds, glaciers > 1 km^{2} (0.386 sq mi or 247 acres) and river estuaries.

Rhuis is a commune in the Oise department in northern France.

== See also ==
- Communes of the Oise department
