= Les Ageux =

- Commune
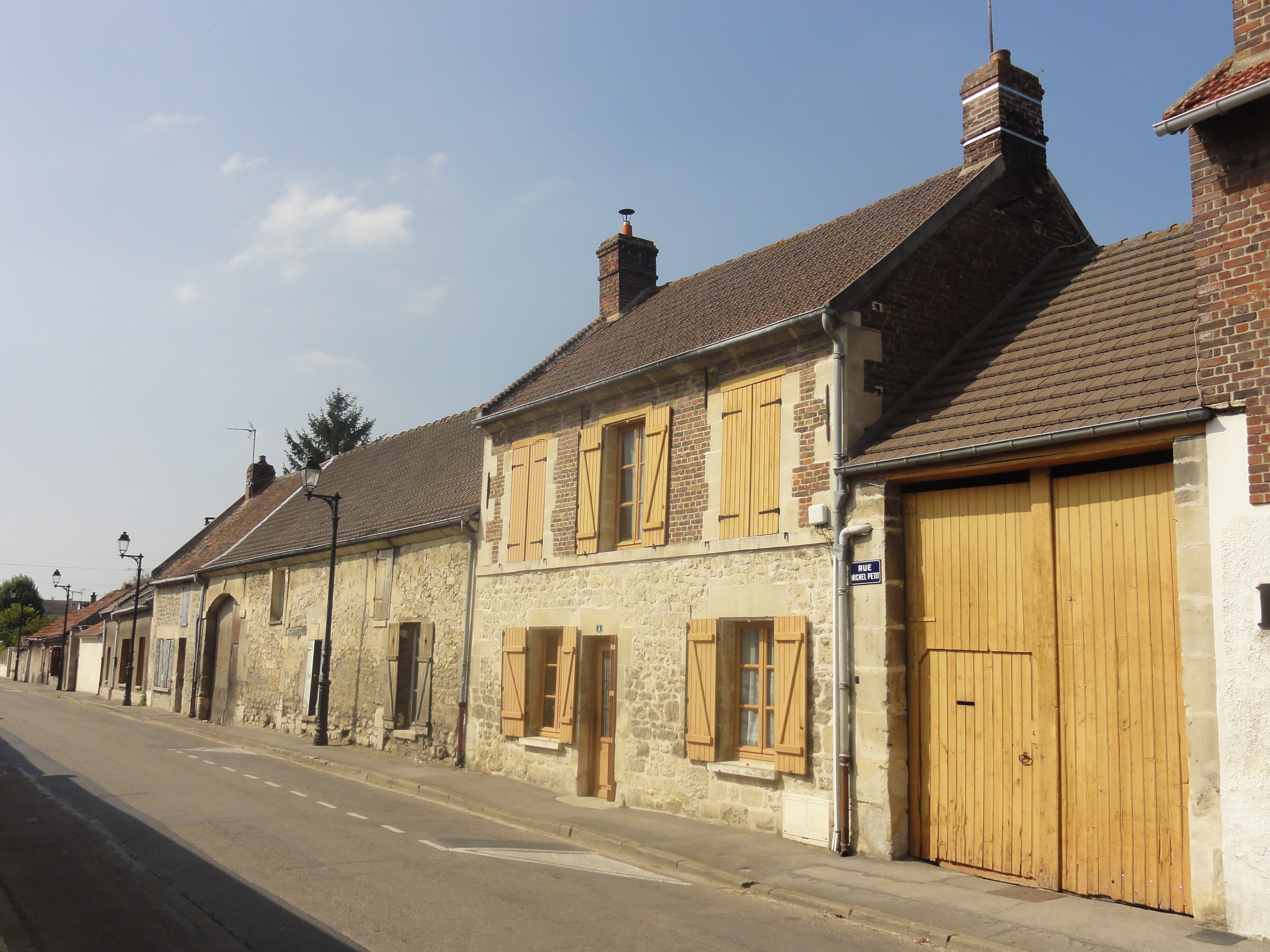
- Rue Michel-Petit in Les Ageux
- Location of Les Ageux
- Location within France Location within Hauts-de-France
- Coordinates: 49°18′56″N 2°35′50″E
- Country: France
- Region: Hauts-de-France
- Department: Oise
- Arrondissement: Clermont
- Canton: Pont-Sainte-Maxence
- Intercommunality: CC Pays d'Oise et d'Halatte

Government
  - Mayor (2025–2026): Catherine Mestiri
- Area^{1}: 5 km^{2} (1.9 sq mi)
- Highest elevation: 42 m (138 ft)
- Lowest elevation: 29 m (95 ft)
- Population (2023): 1,153
  - Density: 230/km^{2} (600/sq mi)
- Time zone: UTC+01:00 (CET)
  - Summer (DST): UTC+02:00 (CEST)
- INSEE/Postal code: 60006 /60700
- ^{1} French Land Register data, which excludes lakes, ponds, glaciers > 1 km^{2} (0.386 sq mi or 247 acres) and river estuaries.

Les Ageux (French pronunciation: [le.z‿aʒø]) is a commune in the Oise department in northern France.

== Population ==
Historical population
Year	Pop.	±% p.a.
1968	729	—
1975	769	+0.77%
1982	857	+1.56%
1990	1,008	+2.05%
1999	1,158	+1.55%
2007	1,156	−0.02%
2012	1,109	−0.83%
2017	1,179	+1.23%
2023	1,153	−0.37%
Source: INSEE

== See also ==
- Communes of the Oise department
