= Bazicourt =

- Commune
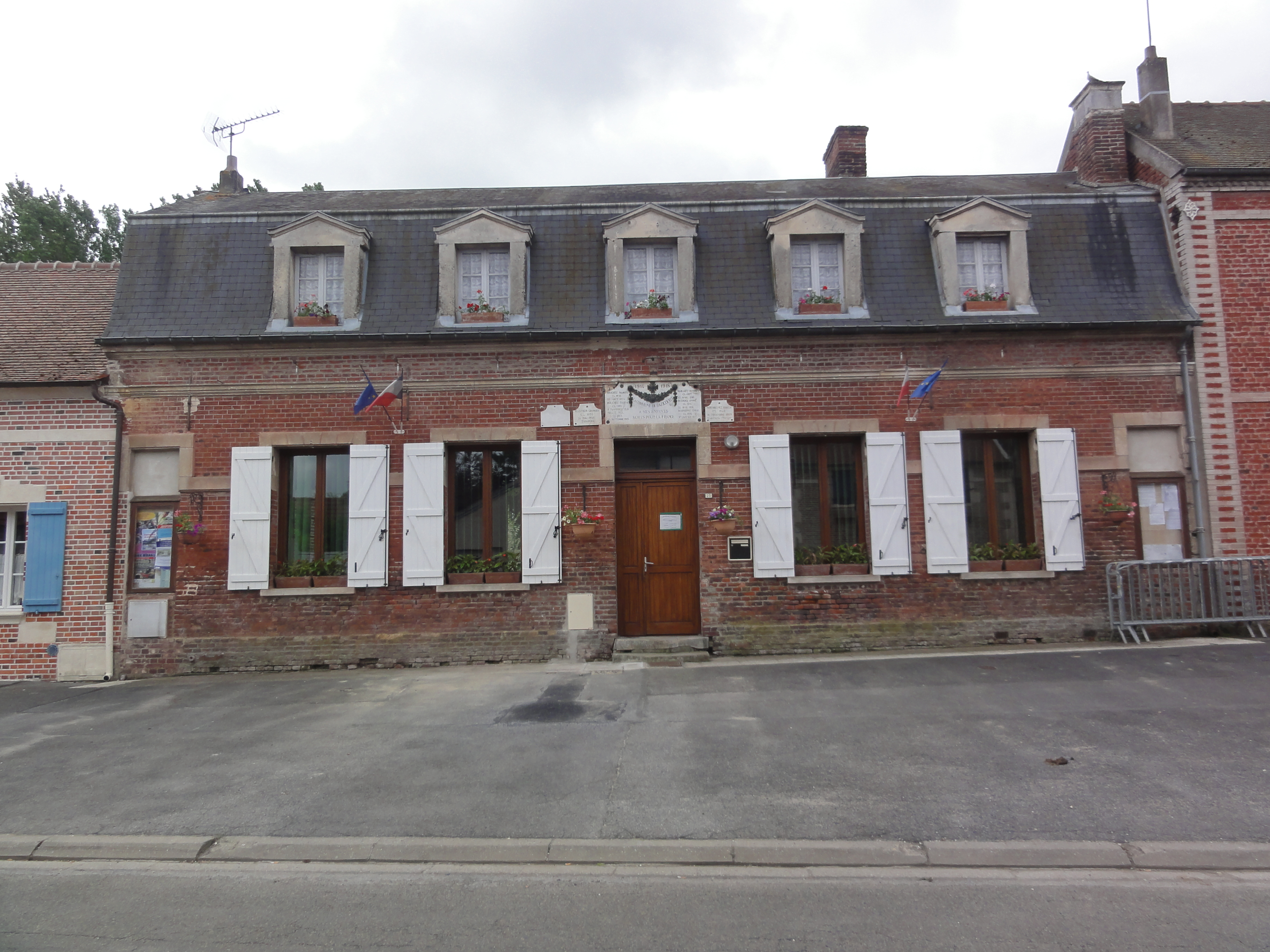
- The town hall in Bazicourt
- Location of Bazicourt
- Location within France Location within Hauts-de-France
- Coordinates: 49°20′38″N 2°37′19″E
- Country: France
- Region: Hauts-de-France
- Department: Oise
- Arrondissement: Clermont
- Canton: Pont-Sainte-Maxence
- Intercommunality: CC Pays d'Oise et d'Halatte

Government
  - Mayor (2020–2026): Marinette Carole
- Area^{1}: 3.82 km^{2} (1.47 sq mi)
- Elevation: 33 m (108 ft)
- Highest elevation: 48 m (157 ft)
- Lowest elevation: 29 m (95 ft)
- Population (2023): 388
  - Density: 102/km^{2} (263/sq mi)
- Time zone: UTC+01:00 (CET)
  - Summer (DST): UTC+02:00 (CEST)
- INSEE/Postal code: 60050 /60700
- ^{1} French Land Register data, which excludes lakes, ponds, glaciers > 1 km^{2} (0.386 sq mi or 247 acres) and river estuaries.

Bazicourt (French pronunciation: [bazikuʁ]) is a commune in the Oise department in northern France

== Population ==
Historical population
Year	Pop.	±% p.a.
1968	243	—
1975	284	+2.25%
1982	347	+2.90%
1990	310	−1.40%
1999	291	−0.70%
2007	323	+1.31%
2012	328	+0.31%
2017	337	+0.54%
2023	388	+2.38%
Source: INSEE

== See also ==
- Communes of the Oise department
