= Villers-Saint-Frambourg =

Commune in Oise, France

- Part of Villers-Saint-Frambourg-Ognon
- Location of Villers-Saint-Frambourg
- Location within France Location within Hauts-de-France
- Coordinates: 49°15′21″N 2°38′24″E
- Country: France
- Region: Hauts-de-France
- Department: Oise
- Arrondissement: Senlis
- Canton: Pont-Sainte-Maxence
- Commune: Villers-Saint-Frambourg-Ognon
- Area^{1}: 9.72 km^{2} (3.75 sq mi)
- Elevation: 82 m (269 ft)
- Highest elevation: 215 m (705 ft)
- Lowest elevation: 81 m (266 ft)
- Population (2019): 551
  - Density: 56.7/km^{2} (147/sq mi)
- Time zone: UTC+01:00 (CET)
  - Summer (DST): UTC+02:00 (CEST)
- Postal code: 60810
- ^{1} French Land Register data, which excludes lakes, ponds, glaciers > 1 km^{2} (0.386 sq mi or 247 acres) and river estuaries.

Villers-Saint-Frambourg (French pronunciation: [vilɛʁ sɛ̃ fʁɑ̃buʁ]) is a former commune in the Oise department in northern France. On 1 January 2019, it was merged into the new commune Villers-Saint-Frambourg-Ognon.

== See also ==
- Communes of the Oise department
