= Villeneuve-sur-Verberie =

- Commune
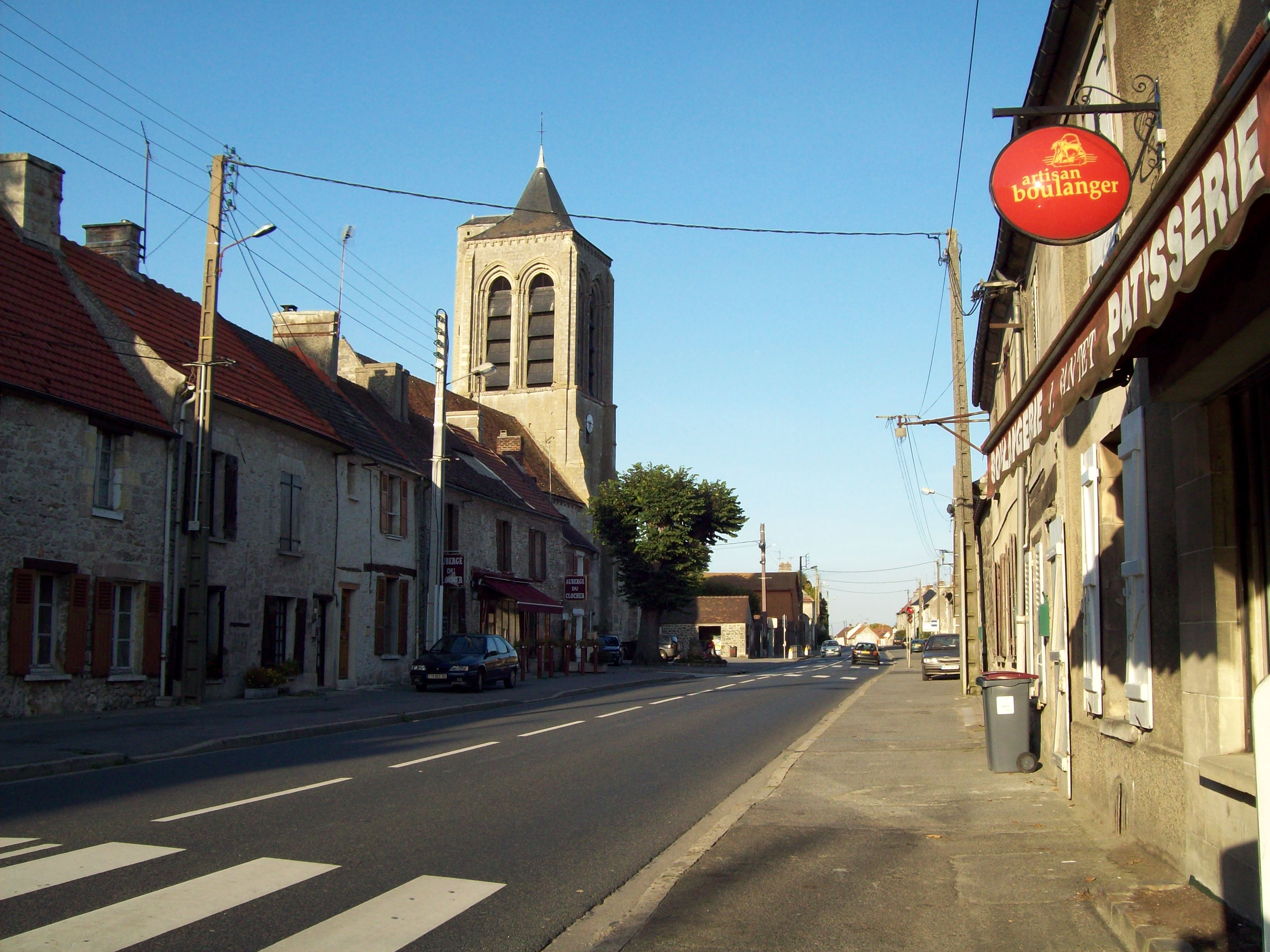
- The main road in Villeneuve-sur-Verberie
- Location of Villeneuve-sur-Verberie
- Location within France Location within Hauts-de-France
- Coordinates: 49°16′35″N 2°41′25″E
- Country: France
- Region: Hauts-de-France
- Department: Oise
- Arrondissement: Senlis
- Canton: Pont-Sainte-Maxence
- Intercommunality: CC Pays d'Oise et d'Halatte

Government
  - Mayor (2020–2026): Monique Ego
- Area^{1}: 8.16 km^{2} (3.15 sq mi)
- Elevation: 120 m (390 ft)
- Highest elevation: 222 m (728 ft)
- Lowest elevation: 51 m (167 ft)
- Population (2023): 724
  - Density: 88.7/km^{2} (230/sq mi)
- Time zone: UTC+01:00 (CET)
  - Summer (DST): UTC+02:00 (CEST)
- INSEE/Postal code: 60680 /60410
- ^{1} French Land Register data, which excludes lakes, ponds, glaciers > 1 km^{2} (0.386 sq mi or 247 acres) and river estuaries.

Villeneuve-sur-Verberie (French pronunciation: [vilnœv syʁ vɛʁbəʁi]) is a commune in the Oise department in northern France.

== See also ==
- Communes of the Oise department
