= Sacy-le-Petit =

- Commune
- Location of Sacy-le-Petit
- Location within France Location within Hauts-de-France
- Coordinates: 49°21′42″N 2°37′48″E
- Country: France
- Region: Hauts-de-France
- Department: Oise
- Arrondissement: Clermont
- Canton: Pont-Sainte-Maxence
- Intercommunality: CC Pays d'Oise et d'Halatte

Government
  - Mayor (2020–2026): François Morenc
- Area^{1}: 7.45 km^{2} (2.88 sq mi)
- Elevation: 107 m (351 ft)
- Highest elevation: 126 m (413 ft)
- Lowest elevation: 40 m (130 ft)
- Population (2023): 638
  - Density: 85.6/km^{2} (222/sq mi)
- Time zone: UTC+01:00 (CET)
  - Summer (DST): UTC+02:00 (CEST)
- INSEE/Postal code: 60563 /60190
- ^{1} French Land Register data, which excludes lakes, ponds, glaciers > 1 km^{2} (0.386 sq mi or 247 acres) and river estuaries.

Sacy-le-Petit (French pronunciation: [sasi lə pəti]) is a commune in the Oise department in northern France.

== See also ==
- Communes of the Oise department
