= Pontpoint =

- Commune
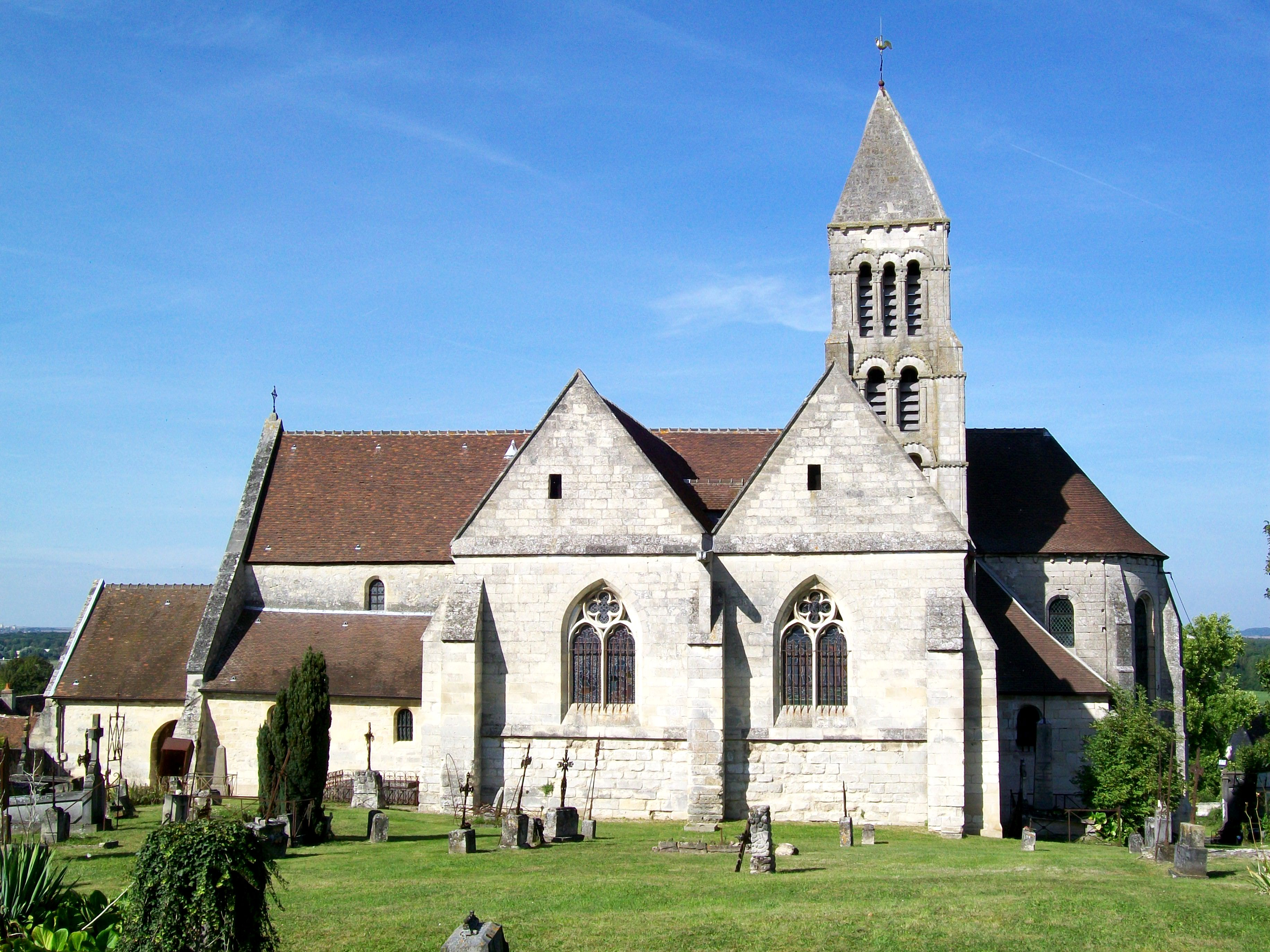
- The church in Pontpoint

- Coat of arms
- Location of Pontpoint
- Location within France Location within Hauts-de-France
- Coordinates: 49°18′07″N 2°38′28″E
- Country: France
- Region: Hauts-de-France
- Department: Oise
- Arrondissement: Senlis
- Canton: Pont-Sainte-Maxence
- Intercommunality: CC Pays d'Oise et d'Halatte

Government
  - Mayor (2020–2026): Bruno Dauguet
- Area^{1}: 19.11 km^{2} (7.38 sq mi)
- Elevation: 50 m (160 ft)
- Highest elevation: 223 m (732 ft)
- Lowest elevation: 29 m (95 ft)
- Population (2023): 3,275
  - Density: 171.4/km^{2} (443.9/sq mi)
- Time zone: UTC+01:00 (CET)
  - Summer (DST): UTC+02:00 (CEST)
- INSEE/Postal code: 60508 /60700
- ^{1} French Land Register data, which excludes lakes, ponds, glaciers > 1 km^{2} (0.386 sq mi or 247 acres) and river estuaries.

Pontpoint (French pronunciation: [pɔ̃pwɛ̃]) is a commune in the Oise department in northern France.

== Population ==
Historical population
Year	Pop.	±% p.a.
1968	1,397	—
1975	1,763	+3.38%
1982	2,382	+4.39%
1990	2,724	+1.69%
1999	2,794	+0.28%
2007	2,877	+0.37%
2012	3,211	+2.22%
2017	3,268	+0.35%
2023	3,275	+0.04%
Source: INSEE

== See also ==
- Communes of the Oise department
