= Saint-Martin-Longueau =

- Commune
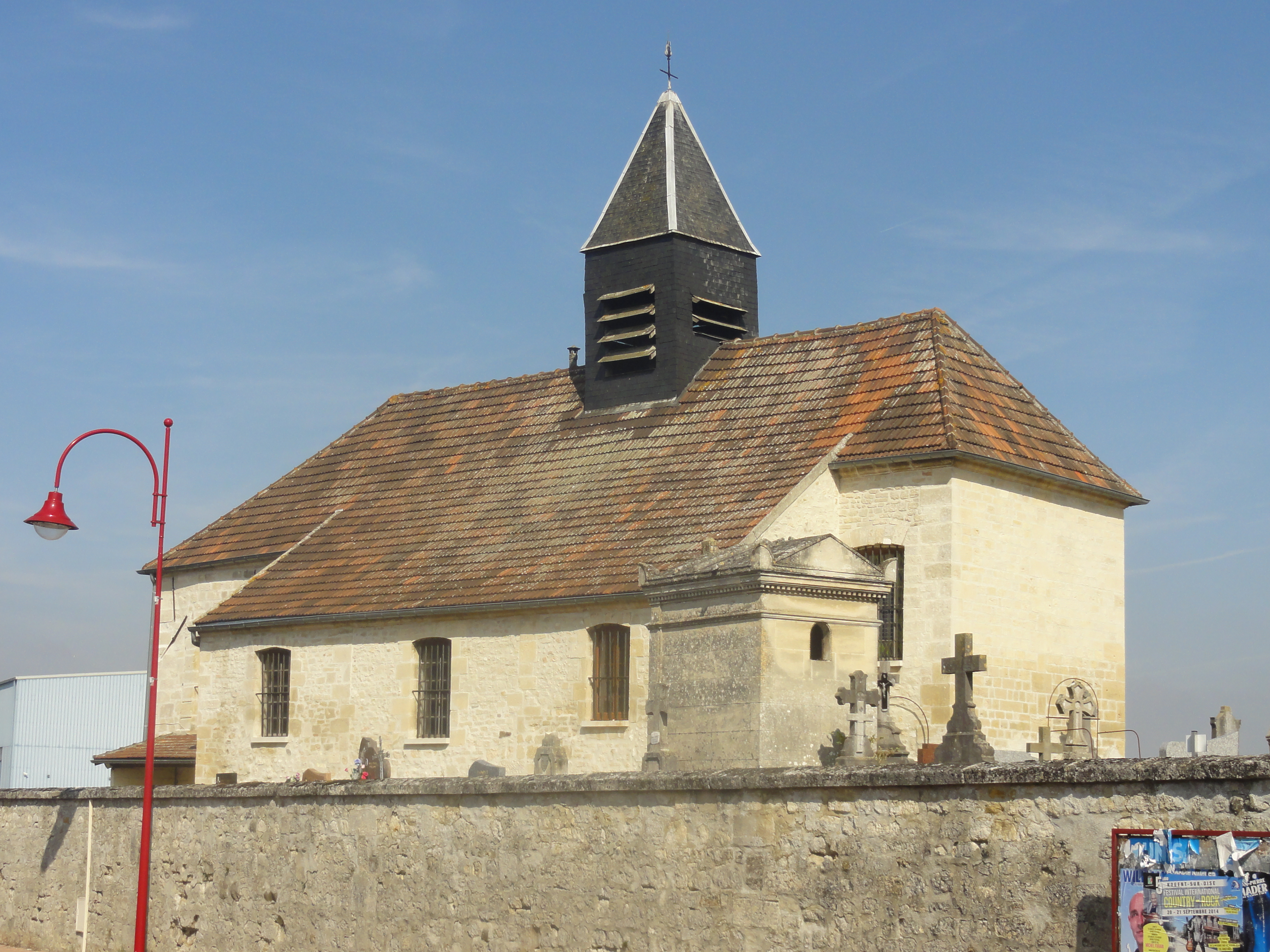
- The church in Saint-Martin-Longueau
- Location of Saint-Martin-Longueau
- Location within France Location within Hauts-de-France
- Coordinates: 49°20′34″N 2°36′18″E
- Country: France
- Region: Hauts-de-France
- Department: Oise
- Arrondissement: Clermont
- Canton: Pont-Sainte-Maxence
- Intercommunality: CC Pays d'Oise et d'Halatte

Government
  - Mayor (2020–2026): Denis Messio
- Area^{1}: 3.62 km^{2} (1.40 sq mi)
- Elevation: 40 m (130 ft)
- Highest elevation: 53 m (174 ft)
- Lowest elevation: 31 m (102 ft)
- Population (2023): 1,449
  - Density: 400/km^{2} (1,040/sq mi)
- Time zone: UTC+01:00 (CET)
  - Summer (DST): UTC+02:00 (CEST)
- INSEE/Postal code: 60587 /60700
- ^{1} French Land Register data, which excludes lakes, ponds, glaciers > 1 km^{2} (0.386 sq mi or 247 acres) and river estuaries.

Saint-Martin-Longueau (French pronunciation: [sɛ̃ maʁtɛ̃ lɔ̃ɡo]) is a commune in the Oise department in northern France.

== See also ==
- Communes of the Oise department
