= Pont-Sainte-Maxence =

- Commune
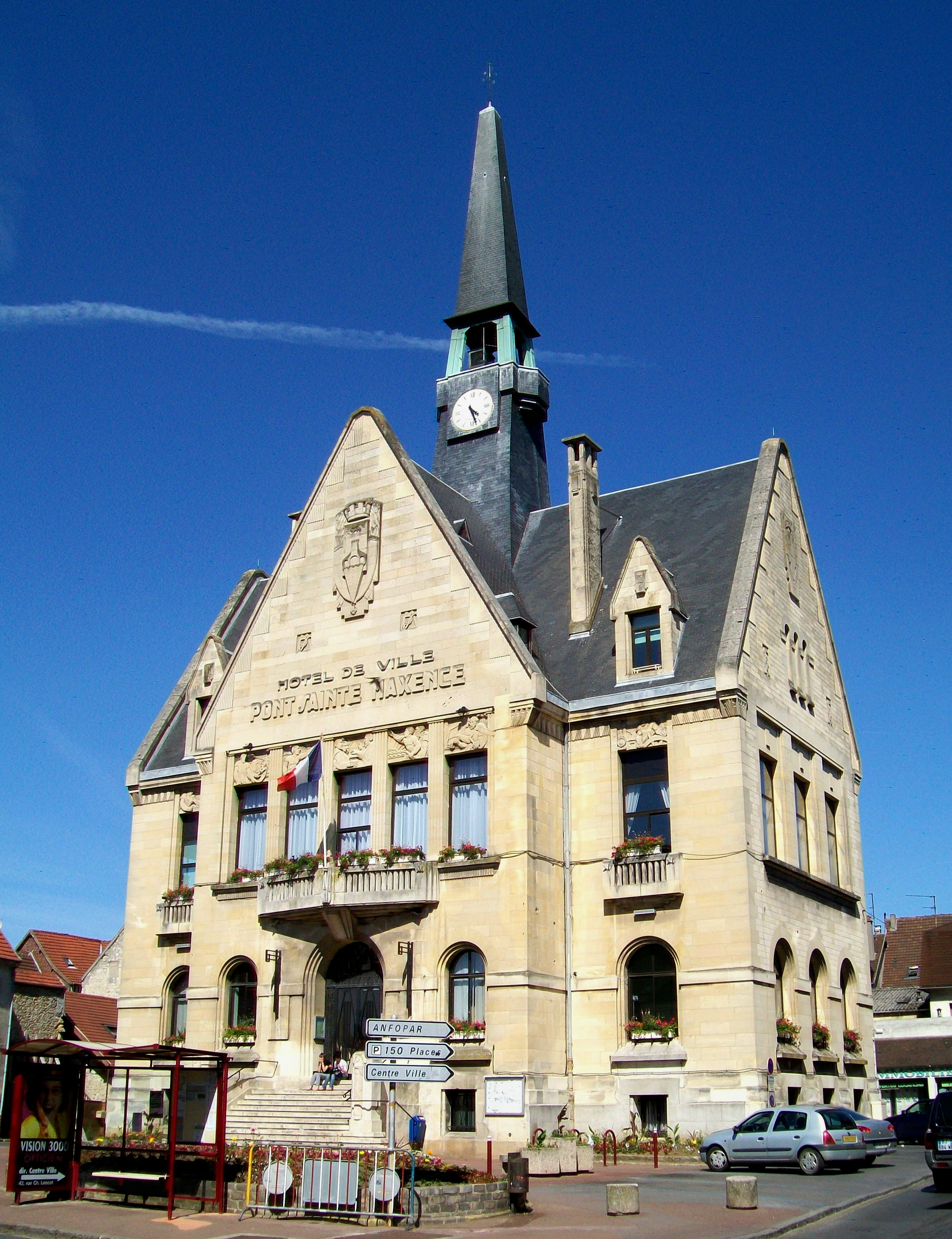
- The town hall in Pont-Sainte-Maxence

- Coat of arms
- Location of Pont-Sainte-Maxence
- Location within France Location within Hauts-de-France
- Coordinates: 49°18′07″N 2°36′16″E
- Country: France
- Region: Hauts-de-France
- Department: Oise
- Arrondissement: Senlis
- Canton: Pont-Sainte-Maxence
- Intercommunality: CC Pays d'Oise et d'Halatte

Government
  - Mayor (2020–2026): Arnaud Dumontier
- Area^{1}: 14.76 km^{2} (5.70 sq mi)
- Highest elevation: 125 m (410 ft)
- Lowest elevation: 28 m (92 ft)
- Population (2023): 12,361
  - Density: 837.5/km^{2} (2,169/sq mi)
- Time zone: UTC+01:00 (CET)
  - Summer (DST): UTC+02:00 (CEST)
- INSEE/Postal code: 60509 /60700
- ^{1} French Land Register data, which excludes lakes, ponds, glaciers > 1 km^{2} (0.386 sq mi or 247 acres) and river estuaries.

Pont-Sainte-Maxence (French pronunciation: [pɔ̃ sɛ̃t maksɑ̃s]) is a commune in the Oise department in northern France, in the region of Hauts-de-France. It is named after Saint Maxentia of Beauvais, whose relics were taken here. Pont-Sainte-Maxence station has rail connections to Saint-Quentin, Compiègne, Creil and Paris.

== Population ==
Historical population
Year	Pop.	±% p.a.
1968	8,639	—
1975	9,359	+1.15%
1982	9,479	+0.18%
1990	10,934	+1.80%
1999	12,445	+1.45%
2007	12,440	−0.01%
2012	12,584	+0.23%
2017	12,209	−0.60%
2023	12,361	+0.21%
Source: INSEE

== Twin towns – sister cities ==
Pont-Sainte-Maxence is twinned with:

- Sambreville, Belgium (1970)
- Linguère, Senegal (1974)
- Sulzbach, Hesse, Germany (1982)
- Grignasco, Italy (1992)
- Felgueiras, Portugal (1993)

== See also ==
- Communes of the Oise department
