= Sacy-le-Grand =

- Commune
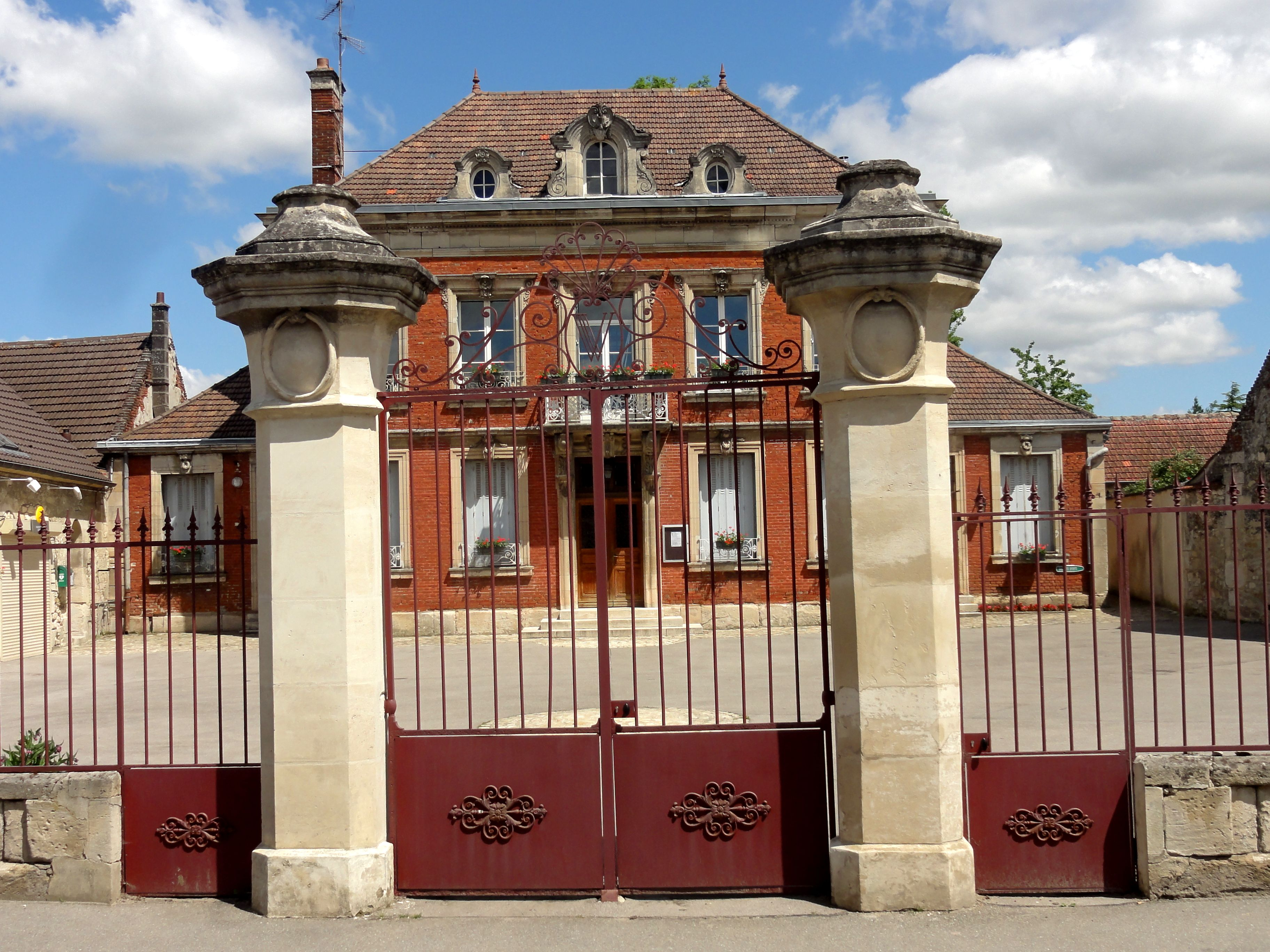
- The town hall in Sacy-le-Grand
- Location of Sacy-le-Grand
- Location within France Location within Hauts-de-France
- Coordinates: 49°21′19″N 2°32′42″E
- Country: France
- Region: Hauts-de-France
- Department: Oise
- Arrondissement: Clermont
- Canton: Pont-Sainte-Maxence
- Intercommunality: CC Pays d'Oise et d'Halatte

Government
  - Mayor (2020–2026): Muriel Perras Jupin
- Area^{1}: 17.7 km^{2} (6.8 sq mi)
- Highest elevation: 160 m (520 ft)
- Lowest elevation: 30 m (98 ft)
- Population (2023): 1,573
  - Density: 88.9/km^{2} (230/sq mi)
- Time zone: UTC+01:00 (CET)
  - Summer (DST): UTC+02:00 (CEST)
- INSEE/Postal code: 60562 /60700
- ^{1} French Land Register data, which excludes lakes, ponds, glaciers > 1 km^{2} (0.386 sq mi or 247 acres) and river estuaries.

Sacy-le-Grand (French pronunciation: [sasi lə ɡʁɑ̃]) is a commune in the Oise department in northern France.

== See also ==
- Communes of the Oise department
