= Silly-Tillard =

- Commune
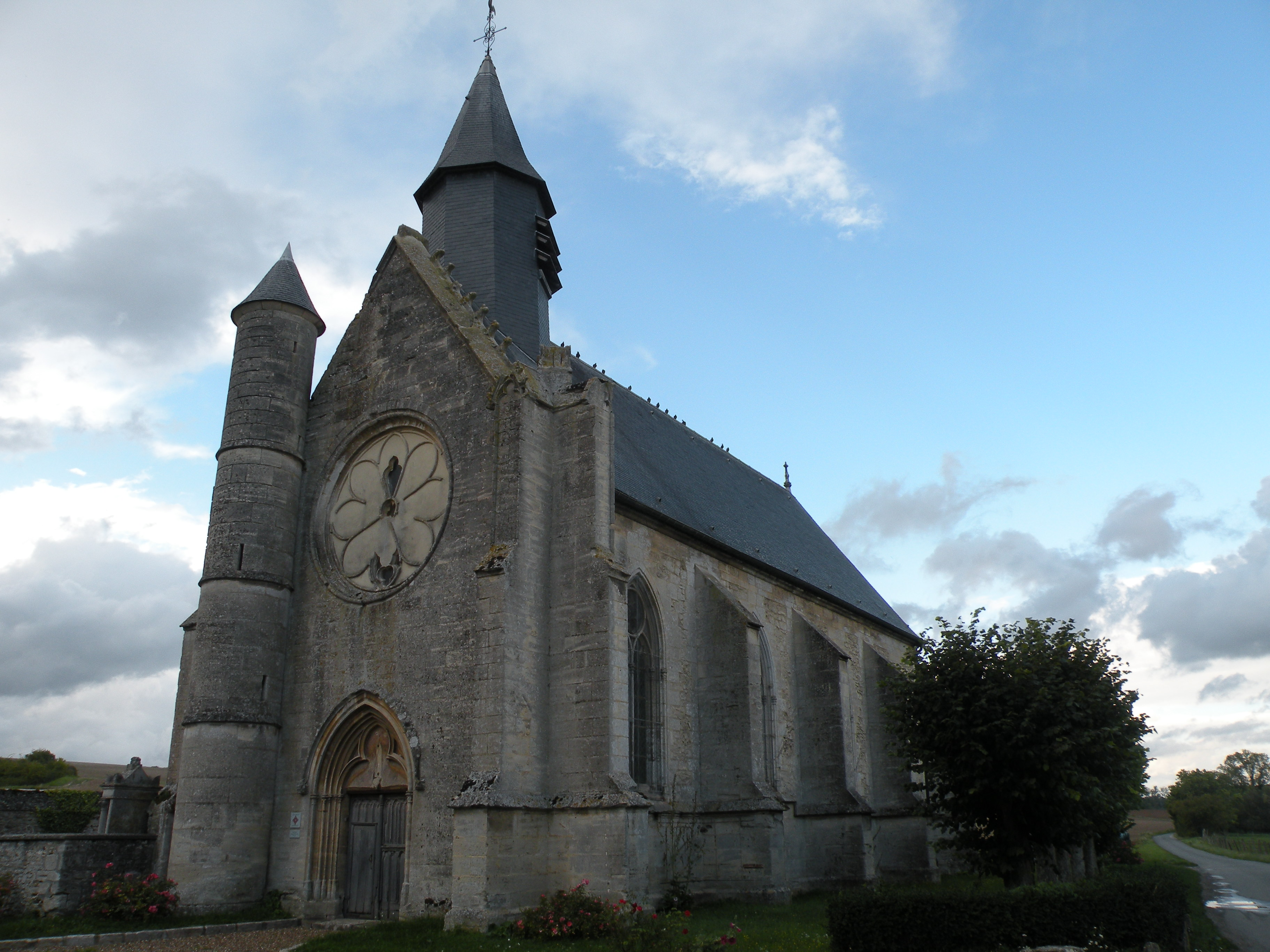
- The church in Silly-Tillard
- Location of Silly-Tillard
- Location within France Location within Hauts-de-France
- Coordinates: 49°19′31″N 2°09′35″E
- Country: France
- Region: Hauts-de-France
- Department: Oise
- Arrondissement: Beauvais
- Canton: Chaumont-en-Vexin
- Intercommunality: CC Thelloise

Government
  - Mayor (2020–2026): Jean Vertadier
- Area^{1}: 11.14 km^{2} (4.30 sq mi)
- Elevation: 95 m (312 ft)
- Highest elevation: 227 m (745 ft)
- Lowest elevation: 78 m (256 ft)
- Population (2023): 450
  - Density: 40/km^{2} (100/sq mi)
- Time zone: UTC+01:00 (CET)
  - Summer (DST): UTC+02:00 (CEST)
- INSEE/Postal code: 60620 /60430
- ^{1} French Land Register data, which excludes lakes, ponds, glaciers > 1 km^{2} (0.386 sq mi or 247 acres) and river estuaries.

Silly-Tillard (French pronunciation: [siji tijaʁ]) is a commune in the Oise department in northern France.

== See also ==
- Communes of the Oise department
