= Rieux, Oise =

Rieux
- Commune
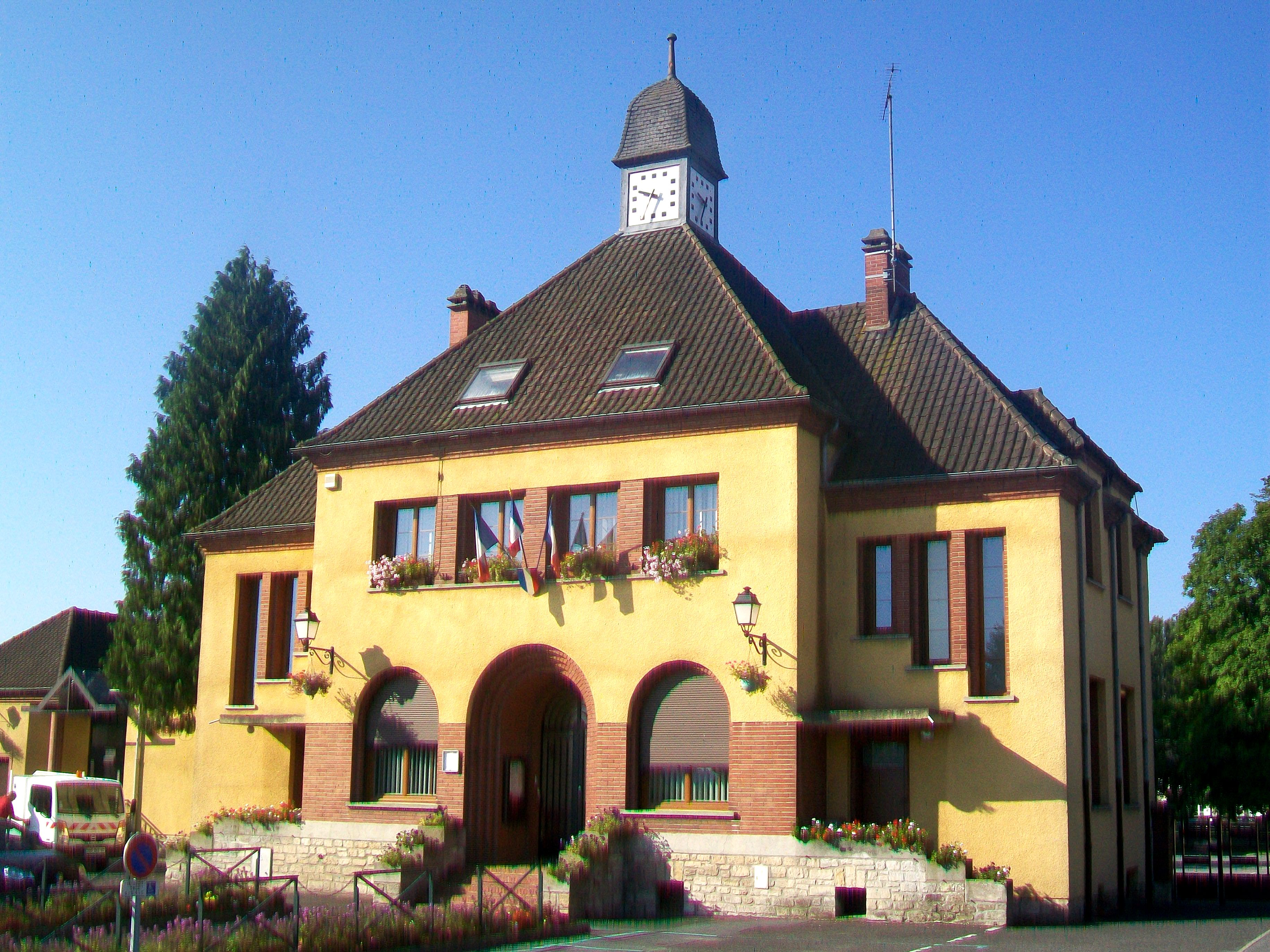
- The town hall in Rieux

- Coat of arms
- Location of Rieux
- Location within France Location within Hauts-de-France
- Coordinates: 49°18′02″N 2°31′11″E
- Country: France
- Region: Hauts-de-France
- Department: Oise
- Arrondissement: Clermont
- Canton: Pont-Sainte-Maxence
- Intercommunality: CC Pays d'Oise et d'Halatte

Government
  - Mayor (2020–2026): Marc Mouilleseaux
- Area^{1}: 2.33 km^{2} (0.90 sq mi)
- Highest elevation: 109 m (358 ft)
- Lowest elevation: 27 m (89 ft)
- Population (2023): 1,559
  - Density: 669/km^{2} (1,730/sq mi)
- Time zone: UTC+01:00 (CET)
  - Summer (DST): UTC+02:00 (CEST)
- INSEE/Postal code: 60539 /60870
- ^{1} French Land Register data, which excludes lakes, ponds, glaciers > 1 km^{2} (0.386 sq mi or 247 acres) and river estuaries.

Rieux (French pronunciation: [ʁijø]) is a commune in the Oise department in Hauts-de-France. The inhabitants are called "les Rioliens" and "les Rioliennes".

== See also ==
- Communes of the Oise department
