= Reilly, Oise =

Reilly
- Commune
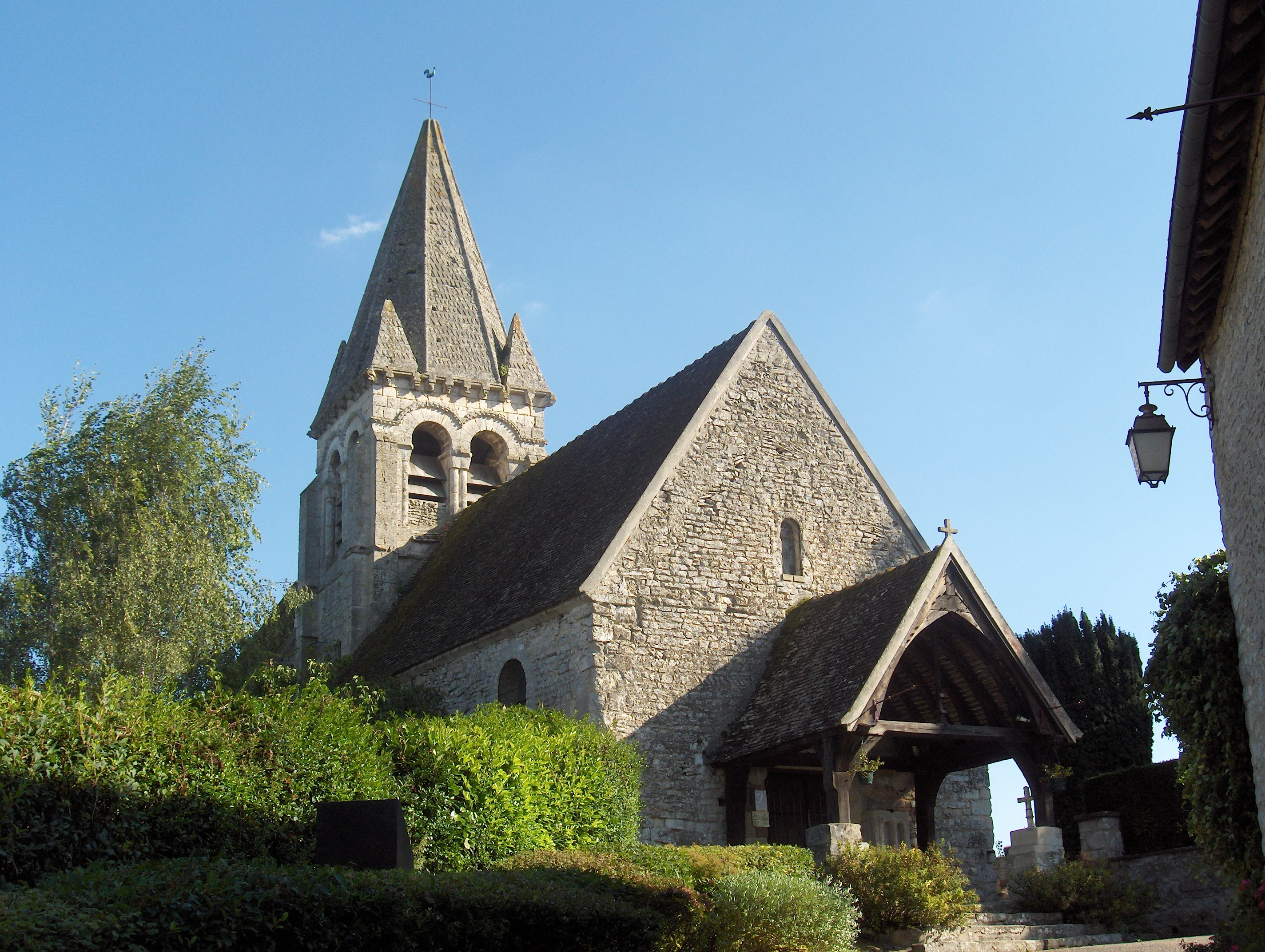
- Church of St. Martin

- Coat of arms
- Location of Reilly
- Location within France Location within Hauts-de-France
- Coordinates: 49°14′40″N 1°50′51″E
- Country: France
- Region: Hauts-de-France
- Department: Oise
- Arrondissement: Beauvais
- Canton: Chaumont-en-Vexin
- Intercommunality: Vexin Thelle

Government
  - Mayor (2020–2026): Marc Metzger
- Area^{1}: 8.32 km^{2} (3.21 sq mi)
- Elevation: 100 m (330 ft)
- Highest elevation: 141 m (463 ft)
- Lowest elevation: 72 m (236 ft)
- Population (2023): 115
  - Density: 13.8/km^{2} (35.8/sq mi)
- Time zone: UTC+01:00 (CET)
  - Summer (DST): UTC+02:00 (CEST)
- INSEE/Postal code: 60528 /60240
- ^{1} French Land Register data, which excludes lakes, ponds, glaciers > 1 km^{2} (0.386 sq mi or 247 acres) and river estuaries.

Reilly (French pronunciation: [ʁɛji]) is a commune in the Oise department in northern France.

== See also ==
- Communes of the Oise department
