= Roberval, Oise =

Roberval
- Commune
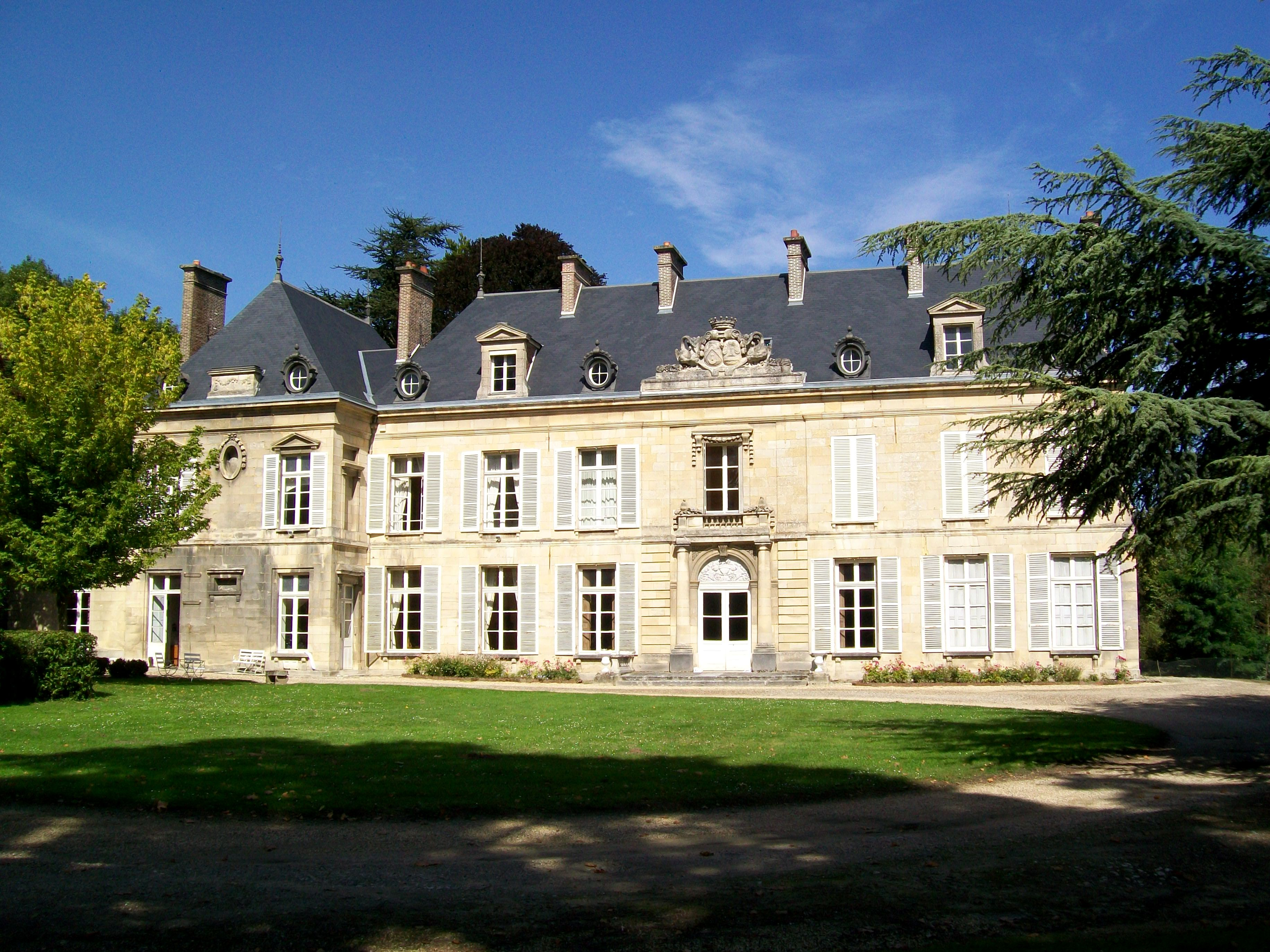
- The chateau in Roberval

- Coat of arms
- Location of Roberval
- Location within France Location within Hauts-de-France
- Coordinates: 49°17′30″N 2°41′24″E
- Country: France
- Region: Hauts-de-France
- Department: Oise
- Arrondissement: Senlis
- Canton: Pont-Sainte-Maxence
- Intercommunality: CC Pays d'Oise et d'Halatte

Government
  - Mayor (2020–2026): Michel Verplaetse
- Area^{1}: 4.83 km^{2} (1.86 sq mi)
- Elevation: 100 m (330 ft)
- Highest elevation: 150 m (490 ft)
- Lowest elevation: 34 m (112 ft)
- Population (2023): 350
  - Density: 72/km^{2} (190/sq mi)
- Time zone: UTC+01:00 (CET)
  - Summer (DST): UTC+02:00 (CEST)
- INSEE/Postal code: 60541 /60410
- ^{1} French Land Register data, which excludes lakes, ponds, glaciers > 1 km^{2} (0.386 sq mi or 247 acres) and river estuaries.

Roberval (French pronunciation: [ʁɔbɛʁval]) is a commune in the Oise department in northern France.

== See also ==
- Communes of the Oise department
