= Canton of Pont-Sainte-Maxence =

Canton of France

Coordinates: 49.30°N 2.60°E

- Canton
- Situation of the canton of Pont-Sainte-Maxence in the department of Oise
- Country: France
- Region: Hauts-de-France
- Department: Oise
- No. of communes: {{{nbcomm}}}
- Population (2023): 32,101
- INSEE code: 6018

The canton of Pont-Sainte-Maxence is an administrative division of the Oise department, northern France. Its borders were modified at the French canton reorganisation which came into effect in March 2015. Its seat is in Pont-Sainte-Maxence.

It consists of the following communes:

1. Les Ageux
2. Angicourt
3. Barbery
4. Bazicourt
5. Beaurepaire
6. Brasseuse
7. Brenouille
8. Cinqueux
9. Monceaux
10. Montépilloy
11. Pontpoint
12. Pont-Sainte-Maxence
13. Raray
14. Rhuis
15. Rieux
16. Roberval
17. Rully
18. Sacy-le-Grand
19. Sacy-le-Petit
20. Saint-Martin-Longueau
21. Villeneuve-sur-Verberie
22. Villers-Saint-Frambourg-Ognon
