= Fournival =

- Commune
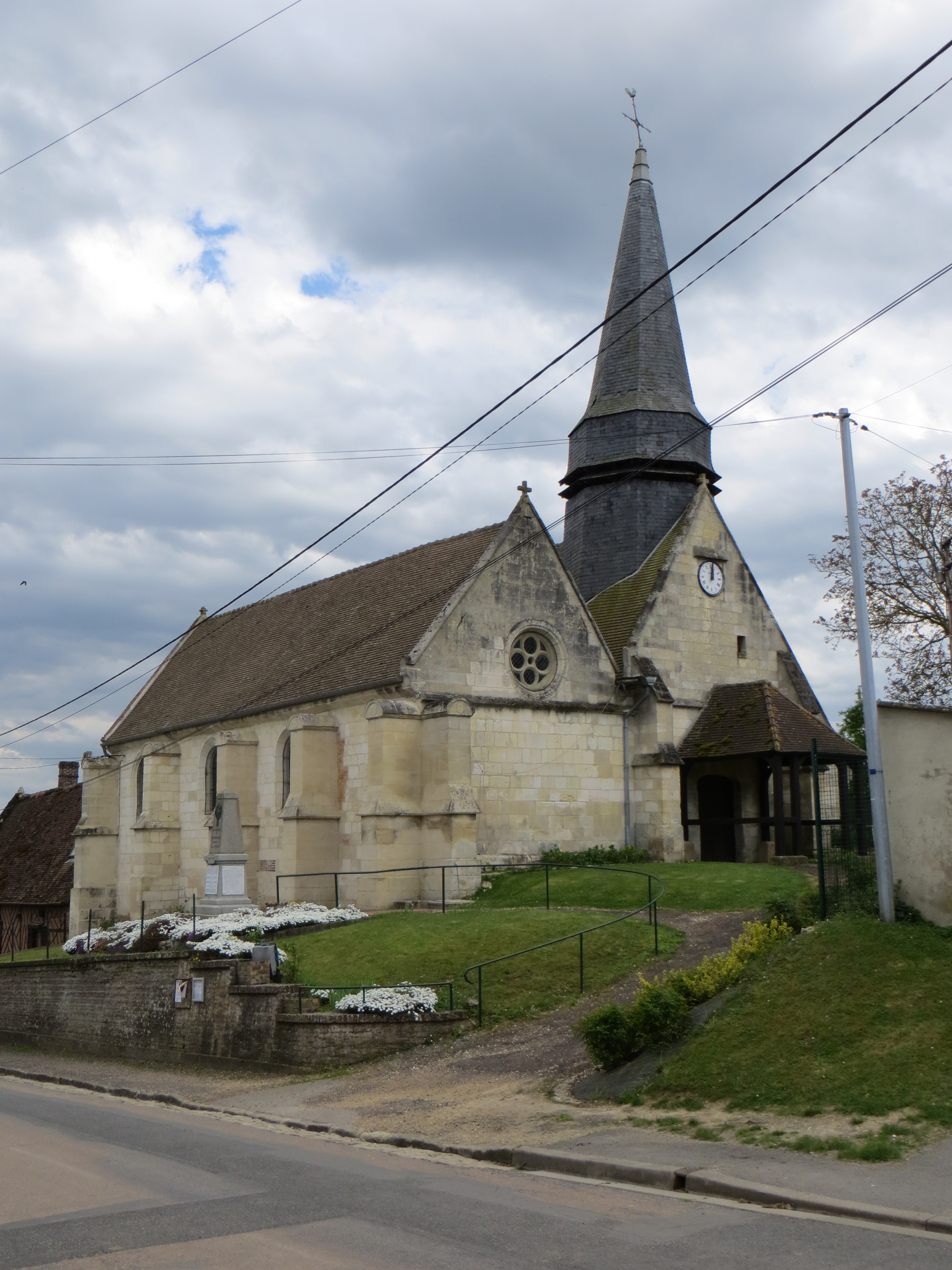
- The church in Fournival
- Location of Fournival
- Location within France Location within Hauts-de-France
- Coordinates: 49°28′02″N 2°23′04″E
- Country: France
- Region: Hauts-de-France
- Department: Oise
- Arrondissement: Clermont
- Canton: Saint-Just-en-Chaussée
- Intercommunality: Plateau Picard

Government
  - Mayor (2020–2026): Olivier Coulon
- Area^{1}: 11.53 km^{2} (4.45 sq mi)
- Elevation: 100 m (330 ft)
- Highest elevation: 159 m (522 ft)
- Lowest elevation: 84 m (276 ft)
- Population (2023): 519
  - Density: 45.0/km^{2} (117/sq mi)
- Time zone: UTC+01:00 (CET)
  - Summer (DST): UTC+02:00 (CEST)
- INSEE/Postal code: 60252 /60130
- ^{1} French Land Register data, which excludes lakes, ponds, glaciers > 1 km^{2} (0.386 sq mi or 247 acres) and river estuaries.

Fournival (French pronunciation: [fuʁnival]) is a commune in the Oise department, located in northern France.

== Transport ==
The D55 and D101 roads pass through the commune. There is a train station in the neighbouring commune Saint-Remy-en-l'Eau.

== See also ==
- Communes of the Oise department
