= Bonneuil =

Bonneuil is the name or part of the name of seven communes of France:

- Bonneuil, Charente in the Charente département
- Bonneuil, Indre in the Indre département
- Bonneuil-en-France in the Val-d'Oise département
- Bonneuil-en-Valois in the Oise département
- Bonneuil-les-Eaux in the Oise département
- Bonneuil-Matours in the Vienne département
- Bonneuil-sur-Marne in the Val-de-Marne département
