= Le Plessier-sur-Bulles =

- Commune
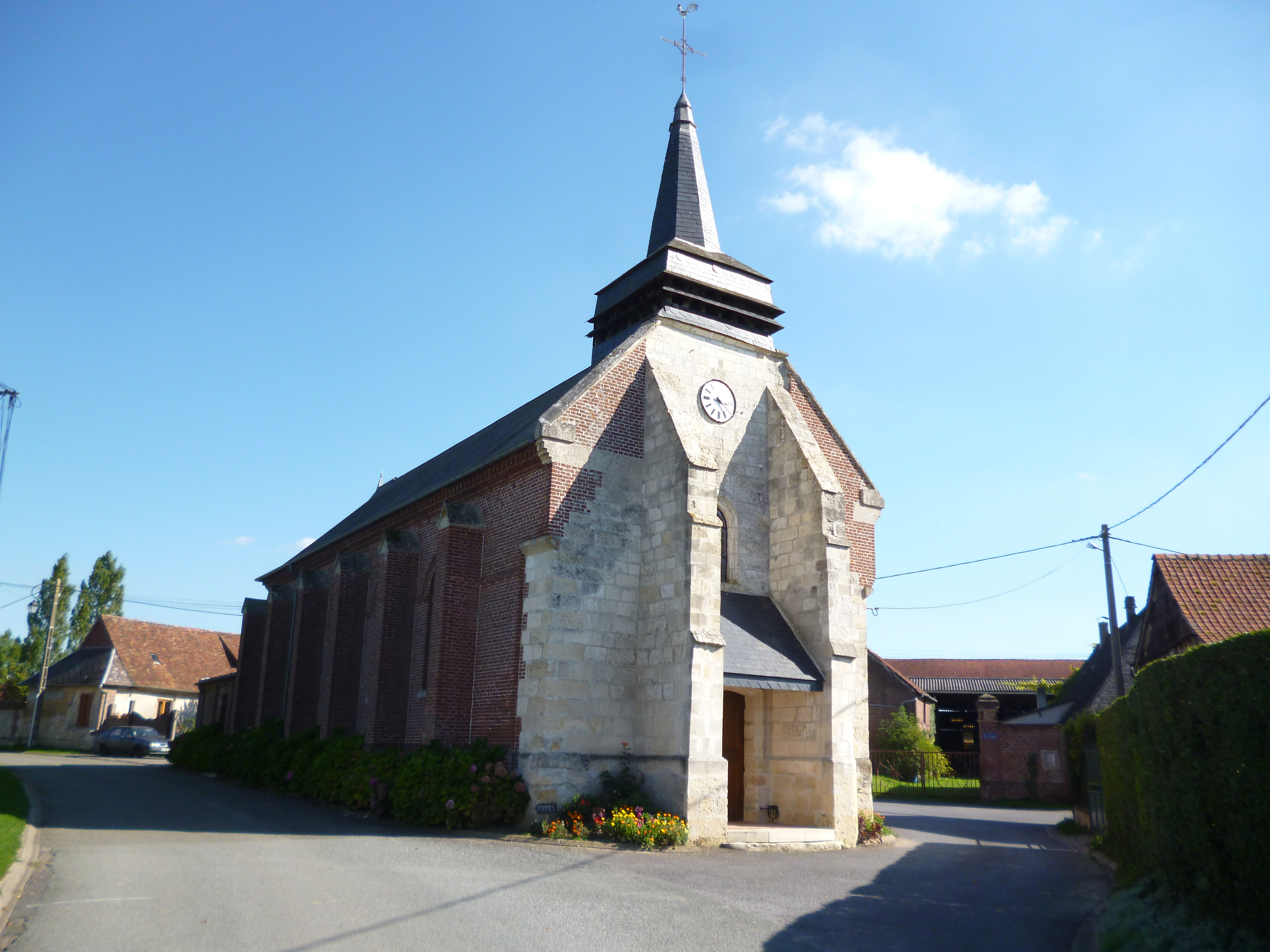
- The church in Le Plessier-sur-Bulles

- Coat of arms
- Location of Le Plessier-sur-Bulles
- Location within France Location within Hauts-de-France
- Coordinates: 49°29′45″N 2°18′57″E
- Country: France
- Region: Hauts-de-France
- Department: Oise
- Arrondissement: Clermont
- Canton: Saint-Just-en-Chaussée
- Intercommunality: Plateau Picard

Government
  - Mayor (2020–2026): Hervé Paucellier
- Area^{1}: 3.91 km^{2} (1.51 sq mi)
- Elevation: 143 m (469 ft)
- Highest elevation: 162 m (531 ft)
- Lowest elevation: 91 m (299 ft)
- Population (2023): 213
  - Density: 54.5/km^{2} (141/sq mi)
- Time zone: UTC+01:00 (CET)
  - Summer (DST): UTC+02:00 (CEST)
- INSEE/Postal code: 60497 /60130
- ^{1} French Land Register data, which excludes lakes, ponds, glaciers > 1 km^{2} (0.386 sq mi or 247 acres) and river estuaries.

Le Plessier-sur-Bulles (French pronunciation: [lə plɛsje syʁ byl], literally Le Plessier on Bulles) is a commune in the Oise department in northern France.

== See also ==
- Communes of the Oise department
