= Rouvroy-les-Merles =

- Commune
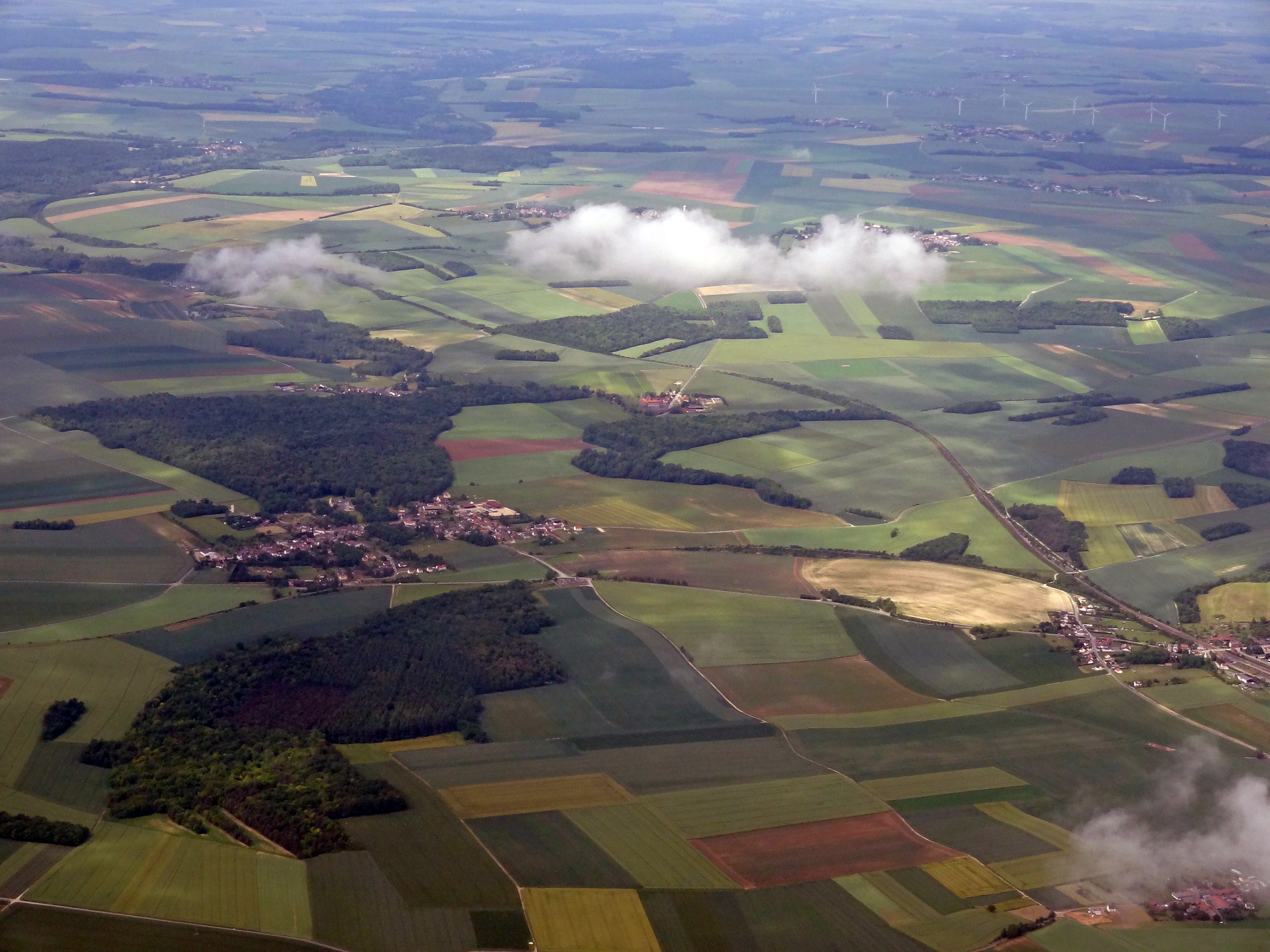
- An aerial view of Tartigny and Rouvroy-les-Merles
- Location of Rouvroy-les-Merles
- Location within France Location within Hauts-de-France
- Coordinates: 49°38′55″N 2°21′31″E
- Country: France
- Region: Hauts-de-France
- Department: Oise
- Arrondissement: Clermont
- Canton: Saint-Just-en-Chaussée

Government
  - Mayor (2020–2026): Maurice Meulin
- Area^{1}: 4.06 km^{2} (1.57 sq mi)
- Elevation: 95 m (312 ft)
- Highest elevation: 113 m (371 ft)
- Lowest elevation: 67 m (220 ft)
- Population (2023): 71
  - Density: 17/km^{2} (45/sq mi)
- Time zone: UTC+01:00 (CET)
  - Summer (DST): UTC+02:00 (CEST)
- INSEE/Postal code: 60555 /60120
- ^{1} French Land Register data, which excludes lakes, ponds, glaciers > 1 km^{2} (0.386 sq mi or 247 acres) and river estuaries.

Rouvroy-les-Merles (French pronunciation: [ʁuvʁwa le mɛʁl]) is a commune in the Oise department in northern France.

== See also ==
- Communes of the Oise department
