= Le Mesnil-sur-Bulles =

- Commune
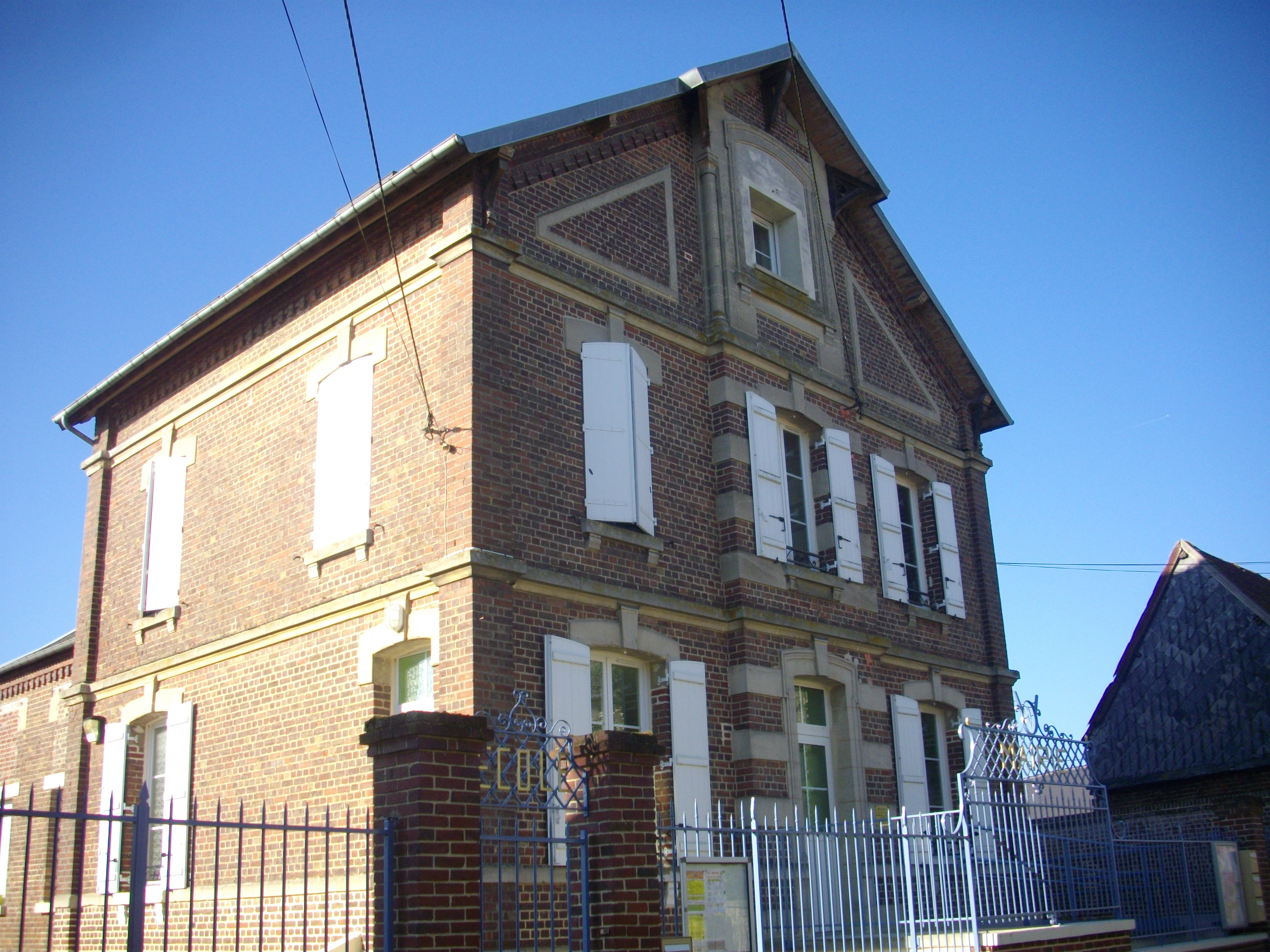
- The town hall in Le Mesnil-sur-Bulles
- Location of Le Mesnil-sur-Bulles
- Location within France Location within Hauts-de-France
- Coordinates: 49°29′12″N 2°20′45″E
- Country: France
- Region: Hauts-de-France
- Department: Oise
- Arrondissement: Clermont
- Canton: Saint-Just-en-Chaussée
- Intercommunality: Plateau Picard

Government
  - Mayor (2020–2026): Jean-Paul Baltz
- Area^{1}: 6.26 km^{2} (2.42 sq mi)
- Elevation: 130 m (430 ft)
- Highest elevation: 163 m (535 ft)
- Lowest elevation: 97 m (318 ft)
- Population (2023): 265
  - Density: 42.3/km^{2} (110/sq mi)
- Time zone: UTC+01:00 (CET)
  - Summer (DST): UTC+02:00 (CEST)
- INSEE/Postal code: 60400 /60130
- ^{1} French Land Register data, which excludes lakes, ponds, glaciers > 1 km^{2} (0.386 sq mi or 247 acres) and river estuaries.

Le Mesnil-sur-Bulles (French pronunciation: [lə mɛnil syʁ byl], literally Le Mesnil on Bulles) is a commune in the Oise department in northern France.

== See also ==
- Communes of the Oise department
