= Thieux =

Thieux may refer to:

- Thieux, Oise
- Thieux, Seine-et-Marne

== See also ==
- Theux, Belgium
