= Plainville, Oise =

Plainville
- Commune
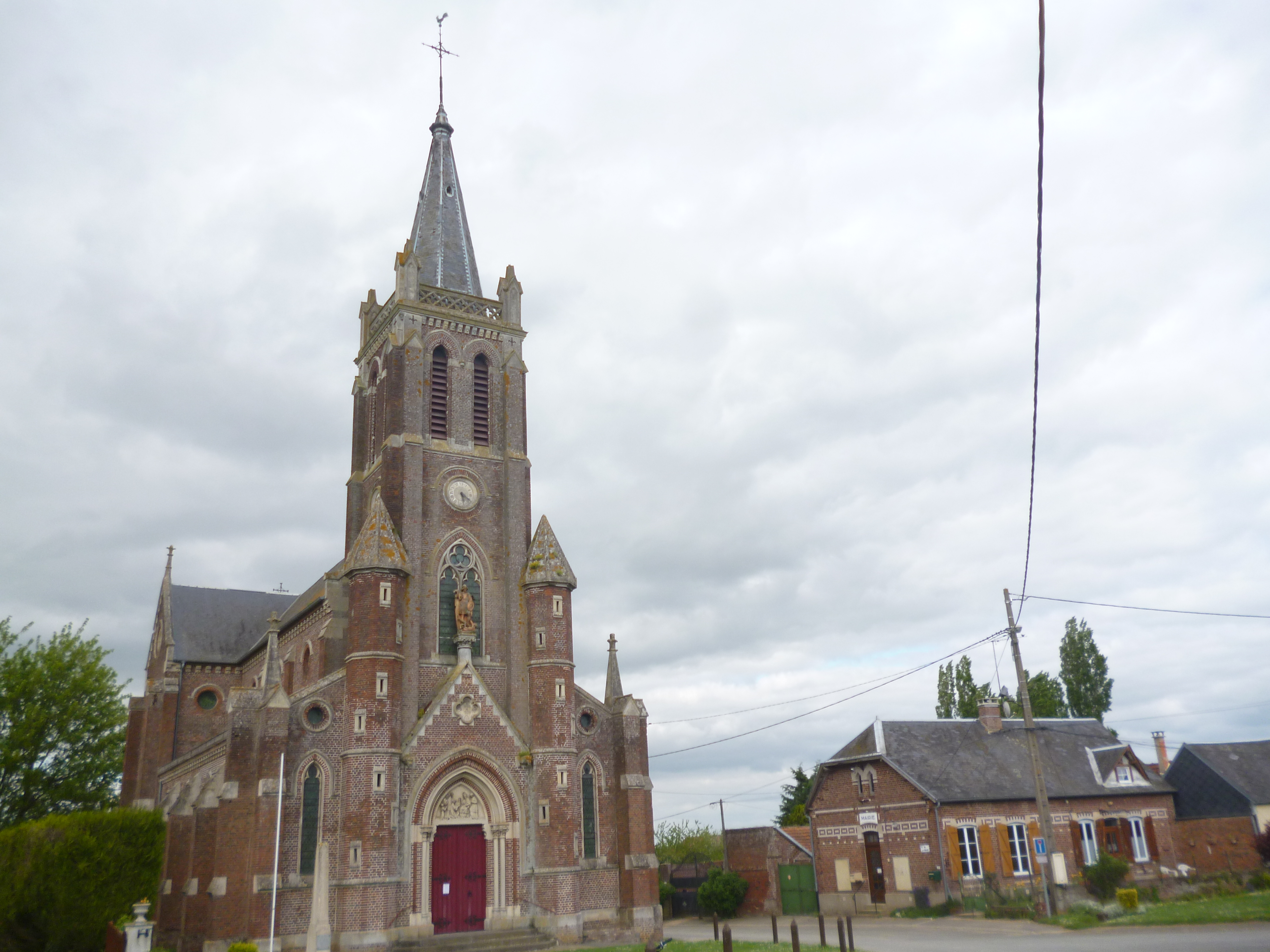
- The church in Plainville
- Location of Plainville
- Location within France Location within Hauts-de-France
- Coordinates: 49°36′51″N 2°27′13″E
- Country: France
- Region: Hauts-de-France
- Department: Oise
- Arrondissement: Clermont
- Canton: Saint-Just-en-Chaussée

Government
  - Mayor (2020–2026): Virginie Gaudefrin
- Area^{1}: 4.25 km^{2} (1.64 sq mi)
- Elevation: 143 m (469 ft)
- Highest elevation: 146 m (479 ft)
- Lowest elevation: 96 m (315 ft)
- Population (2023): 159
  - Density: 37.4/km^{2} (96.9/sq mi)
- Time zone: UTC+01:00 (CET)
  - Summer (DST): UTC+02:00 (CEST)
- INSEE/Postal code: 60496 /60120
- ^{1} French Land Register data, which excludes lakes, ponds, glaciers > 1 km^{2} (0.386 sq mi or 247 acres) and river estuaries.

Plainville (French pronunciation: [plɛ̃vil]) is a commune in the Oise department in northern France.

== Population ==
Historical population
Year	Pop.	±% p.a.
1968	174	—
1975	163	−0.93%
1982	138	−2.35%
1990	124	−1.33%
1999	148	+1.99%
2007	172	+1.90%
2012	168	−0.47%
2017	161	−0.85%
2023	159	−0.21%
Source: INSEE

== See also ==
- Communes of the Oise department
