= Avrechy =

- Commune
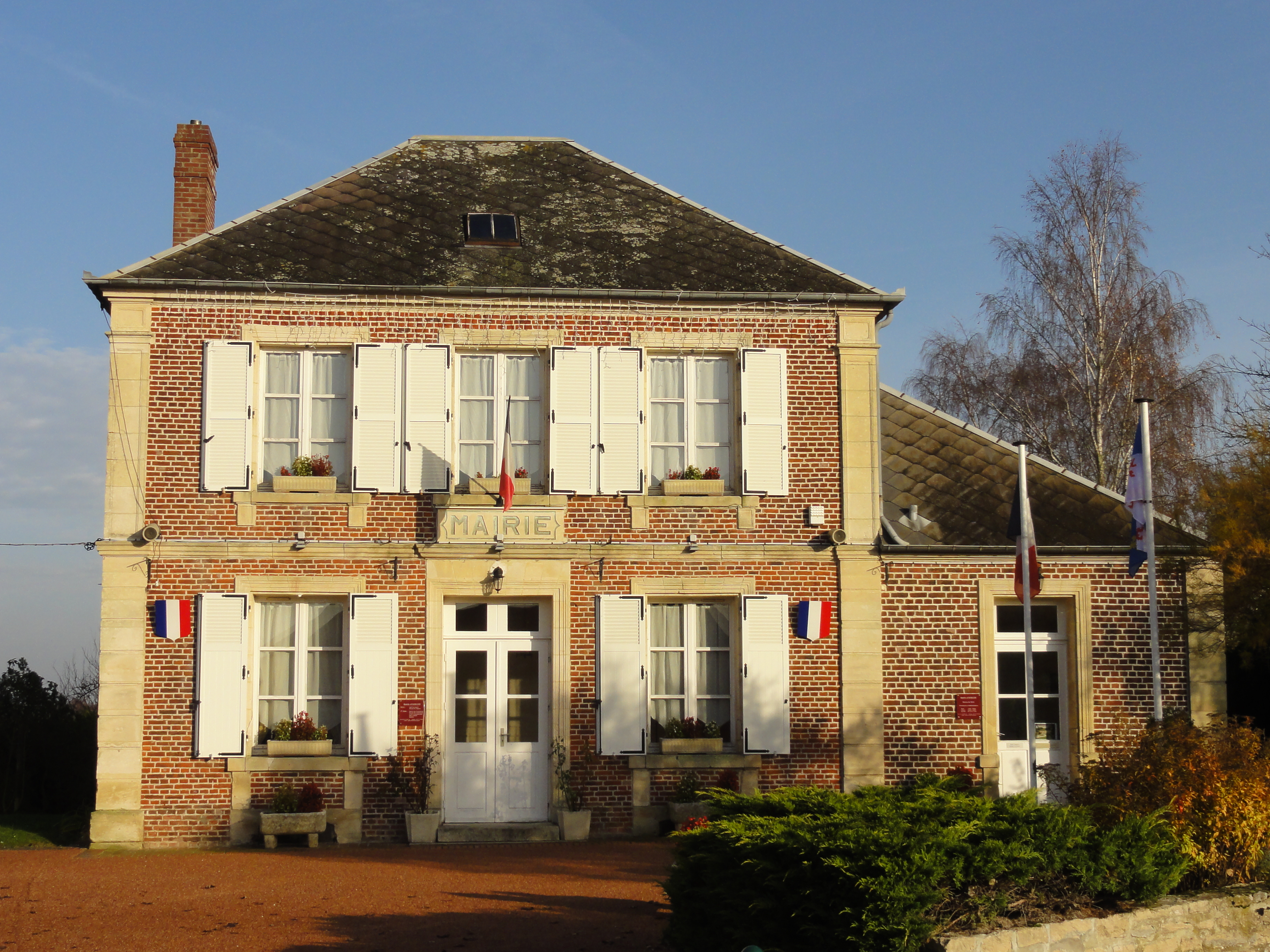
- The town hall in Avrechy

- Coat of arms
- Location of Avrechy
- Location within France Location within Hauts-de-France
- Coordinates: 49°26′52″N 2°25′38″E
- Country: France
- Region: Hauts-de-France
- Department: Oise
- Arrondissement: Clermont
- Canton: Saint-Just-en-Chaussée
- Intercommunality: CC Plateau Picard

Government
  - Mayor (2020–2026): Astride Lequen
- Area^{1}: 12.39 km^{2} (4.78 sq mi)
- Elevation: 80 m (260 ft)
- Highest elevation: 158 m (518 ft)
- Lowest elevation: 62 m (203 ft)
- Population (2023): 1,147
  - Density: 92.57/km^{2} (239.8/sq mi)
- Time zone: UTC+01:00 (CET)
  - Summer (DST): UTC+02:00 (CEST)
- INSEE/Postal code: 60034 /60130
- ^{1} French Land Register data, which excludes lakes, ponds, glaciers > 1 km^{2} (0.386 sq mi or 247 acres) and river estuaries.

Avrechy (French pronunciation: [avʁəʃi]) is a commune in the Oise department in northern France.

== Population ==
Historical population
| Year | Pop. | ±% p.a. |
|---|---|---|
| 1968 | 493 | — |
| 1975 | 655 | +4.14% |
| 1982 | 895 | +4.56% |
| 1990 | 1,032 | +1.80% |
| 1999 | 1,060 | +0.30% |
| 2007 | 1,084 | +0.28% |
| 2012 | 1,140 | +1.01% |
| 2017 | 1,150 | +0.17% |
| 2023 | 1,147 | −0.04% |
Source: INSEE

== See also ==
- Communes of the Oise department
