= Campremy =

- Commune
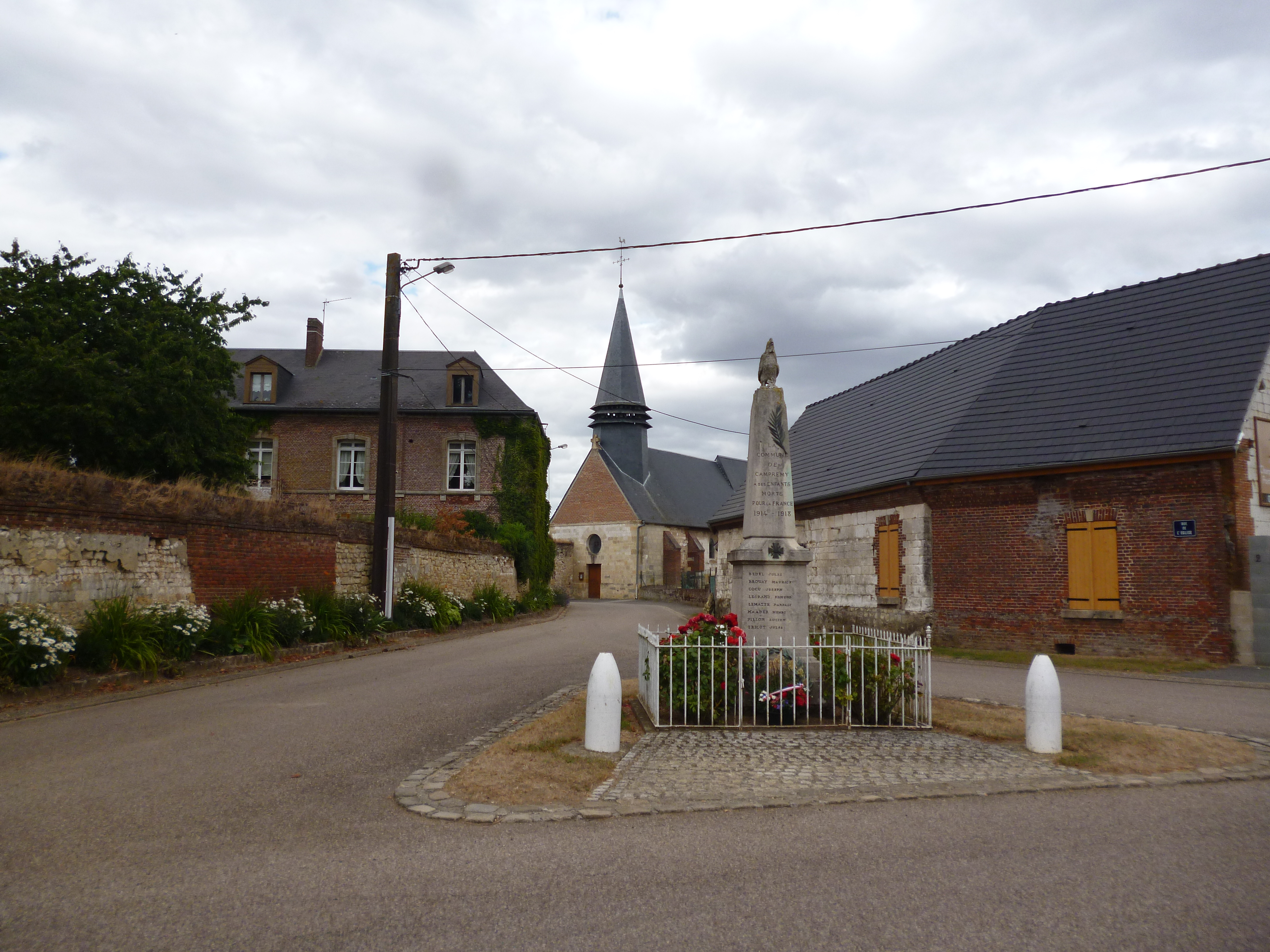
- Th war memorial and church in Campremy
- Location of Campremy
- Location within France Location within Hauts-de-France
- Coordinates: 49°34′17″N 2°18′47″E
- Country: France
- Region: Hauts-de-France
- Department: Oise
- Arrondissement: Clermont
- Canton: Saint-Just-en-Chaussée

Government
  - Mayor (2020–2026): Dominique Commelin
- Area^{1}: 10.21 km^{2} (3.94 sq mi)
- Elevation: 144 m (472 ft)
- Highest elevation: 175 m (574 ft)
- Lowest elevation: 118 m (387 ft)
- Population (2023): 469
  - Density: 45.9/km^{2} (119/sq mi)
- Time zone: UTC+01:00 (CET)
  - Summer (DST): UTC+02:00 (CEST)
- INSEE/Postal code: 60123 /60480
- ^{1} French Land Register data, which excludes lakes, ponds, glaciers > 1 km^{2} (0.386 sq mi or 247 acres) and river estuaries.

Campremy (French pronunciation: [kɑ̃pʁəmi]) is a commune in the Oise department in northern France.

== See also ==
- Communes of the Oise department
