= Ravenel, Oise =

Commune in Hauts-de-France, France

Ravenel
- Commune
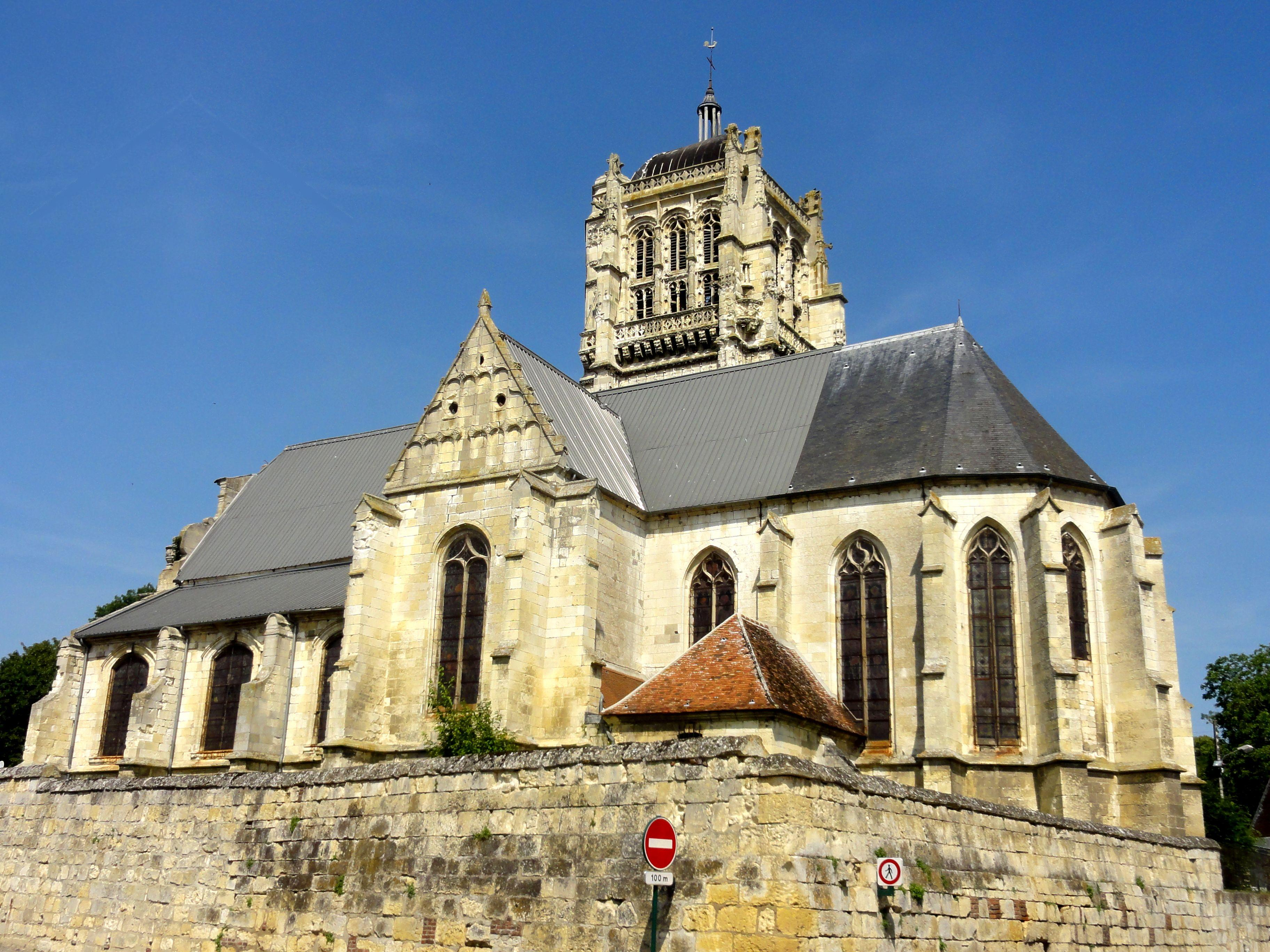
- The church in Ravenel
- Location of Ravenel
- Location within France Location within Hauts-de-France
- Coordinates: 49°30′59″N 2°30′07″E
- Country: France
- Region: Hauts-de-France
- Department: Oise
- Arrondissement: Clermont
- Canton: Saint-Just-en-Chaussée
- Intercommunality: Plateau Picard

Government
  - Mayor (2023–2026): Gérard Leroy
- Area^{1}: 11.61 km^{2} (4.48 sq mi)
- Elevation: 115 m (377 ft)
- Highest elevation: 135 m (443 ft)
- Lowest elevation: 88 m (289 ft)
- Population (2023): 1,041
  - Density: 89.66/km^{2} (232.2/sq mi)
- Time zone: UTC+01:00 (CET)
  - Summer (DST): UTC+02:00 (CEST)
- INSEE/Postal code: 60526 /60130
- ^{1} French Land Register data, which excludes lakes, ponds, glaciers > 1 km^{2} (0.386 sq mi or 247 acres) and river estuaries.

Ravenel (French pronunciation: [ʁavnɛl]) is a commune in the Oise department in northern France.

It is located about 70 kilometres north of Paris.

== See also ==
- Communes of the Oise department
