= Bonvillers =

- Commune
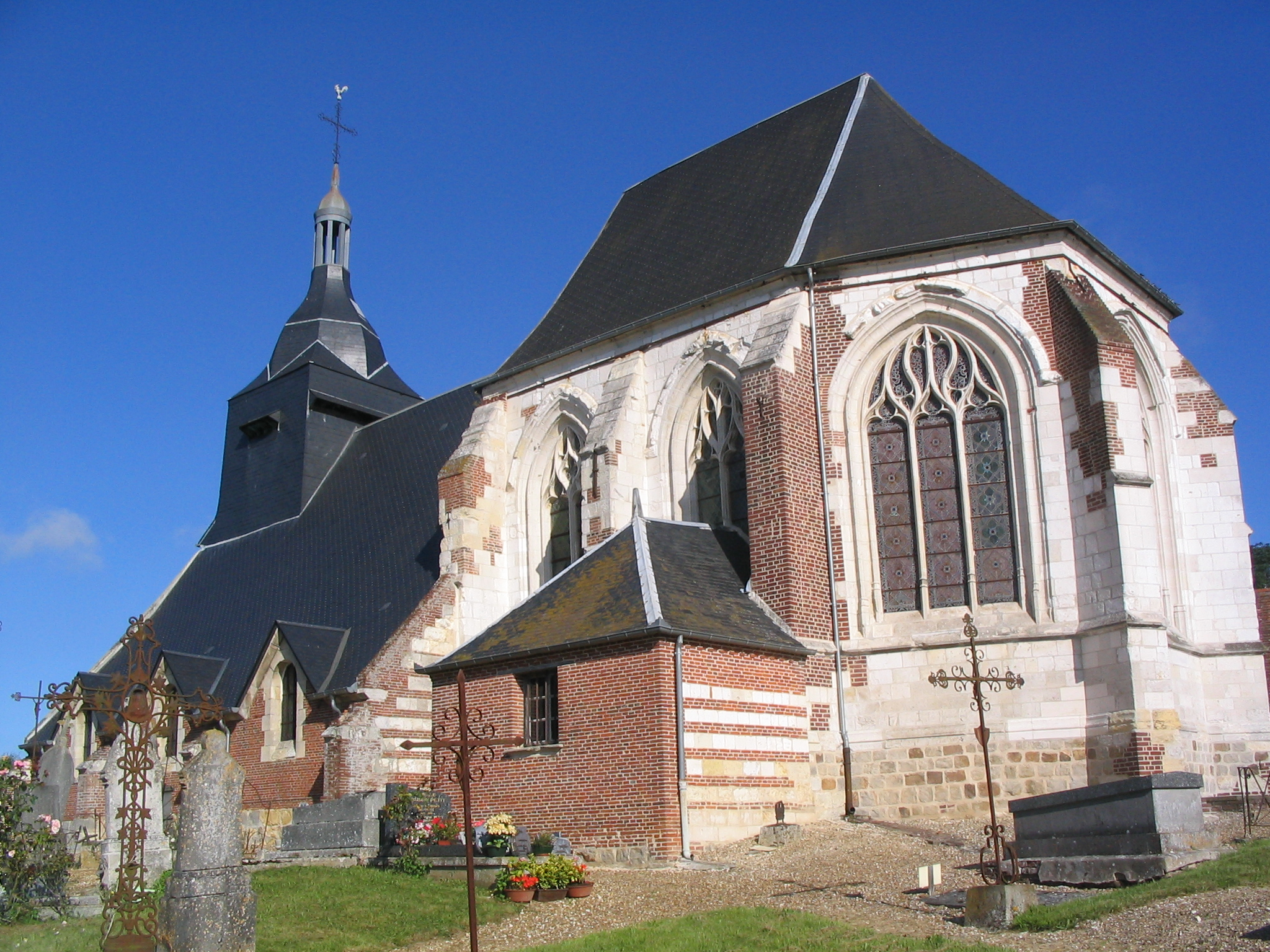
- The church in Bonvillers
- Location of Bonvillers
- Location within France Location within Hauts-de-France
- Coordinates: 49°35′28″N 2°21′21″E
- Country: France
- Region: Hauts-de-France
- Department: Oise
- Arrondissement: Clermont
- Canton: Saint-Just-en-Chaussée

Government
  - Mayor (2020–2026): Vincent Loisel
- Area^{1}: 5.86 km^{2} (2.26 sq mi)
- Elevation: 150 m (490 ft)
- Highest elevation: 161 m (528 ft)
- Lowest elevation: 111 m (364 ft)
- Population (2023): 189
  - Density: 32.3/km^{2} (83.5/sq mi)
- Time zone: UTC+01:00 (CET)
  - Summer (DST): UTC+02:00 (CEST)
- INSEE/Postal code: 60085 /60120
- ^{1} French Land Register data, which excludes lakes, ponds, glaciers > 1 km^{2} (0.386 sq mi or 247 acres) and river estuaries.

Bonvillers is a commune in the Oise department in northern France.

== Population ==
Historical population
Year	Pop.	±% p.a.
1968	143	—
1975	145	+0.20%
1982	165	+1.86%
1990	177	+0.88%
1999	191	+0.85%
2007	202	+0.70%
2012	219	+1.63%
2017	204	−1.41%
2023	189	−1.26%
Source: INSEE

== See also ==
- Communes of the Oise department
