= Le Mesnil-Saint-Firmin =

- Commune
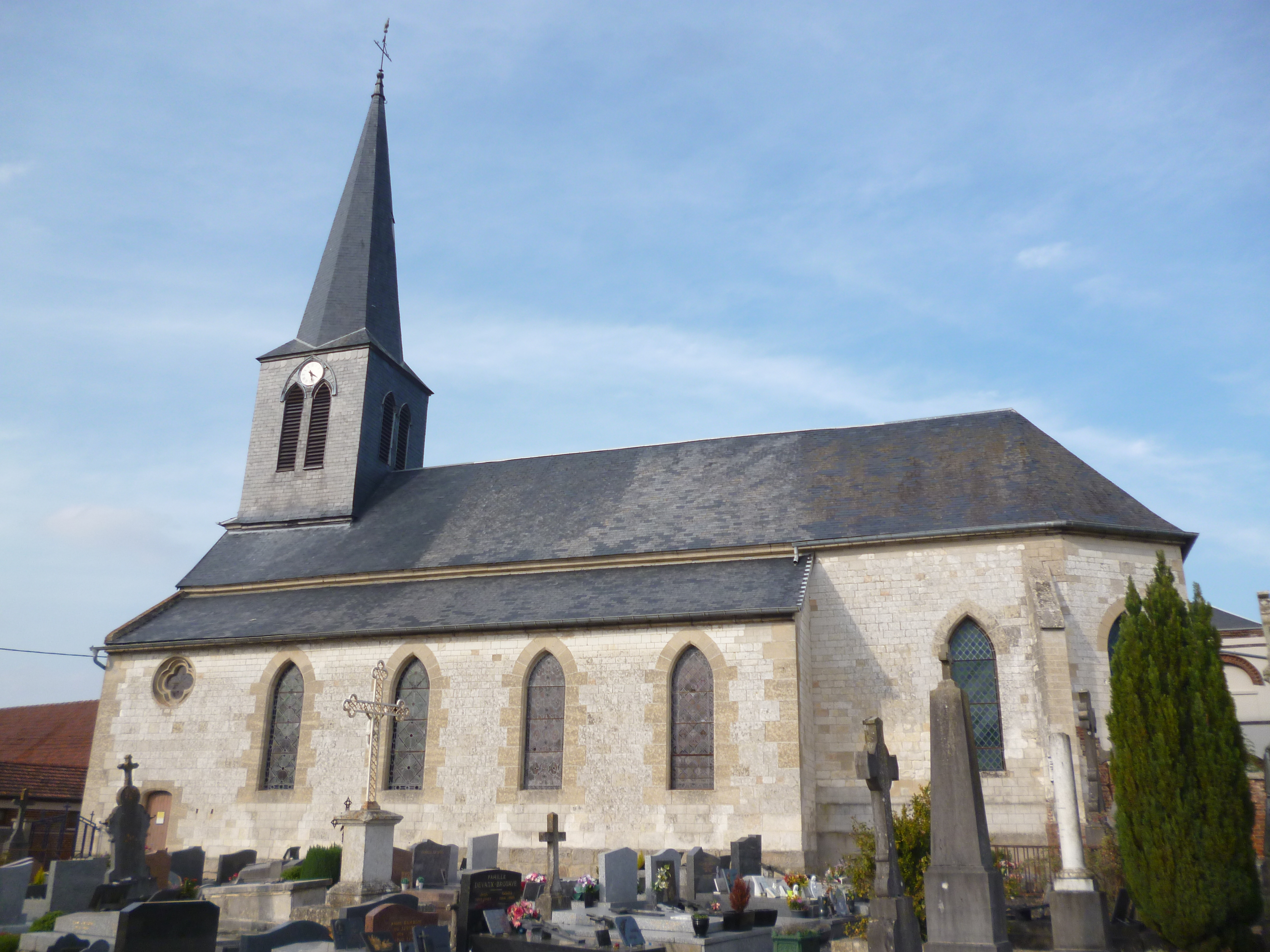
- The church in Le Mesnil-Saint-Firmin

- Coat of arms
- Location of Le Mesnil-Saint-Firmin
- Location within France Location within Hauts-de-France
- Coordinates: 49°37′45″N 2°24′41″E
- Country: France
- Region: Hauts-de-France
- Department: Oise
- Arrondissement: Clermont
- Canton: Saint-Just-en-Chaussée

Government
  - Mayor (2020–2026): Philippe Gheeraert
- Area^{1}: 4.14 km^{2} (1.60 sq mi)
- Elevation: 152 m (499 ft)
- Highest elevation: 158 m (518 ft)
- Lowest elevation: 122 m (400 ft)
- Population (2023): 248
  - Density: 59.9/km^{2} (155/sq mi)
- Time zone: UTC+01:00 (CET)
  - Summer (DST): UTC+02:00 (CEST)
- INSEE/Postal code: 60399 /60120
- ^{1} French Land Register data, which excludes lakes, ponds, glaciers > 1 km^{2} (0.386 sq mi or 247 acres) and river estuaries.

Le Mesnil-Saint-Firmin (French pronunciation: [lə menil sɛ̃ fiʁmɛ̃]) is a commune in the Oise department in northern France.

== See also ==
- Communes of the Oise department
