= Moyenneville, Oise =

Moyenneville
- Commune
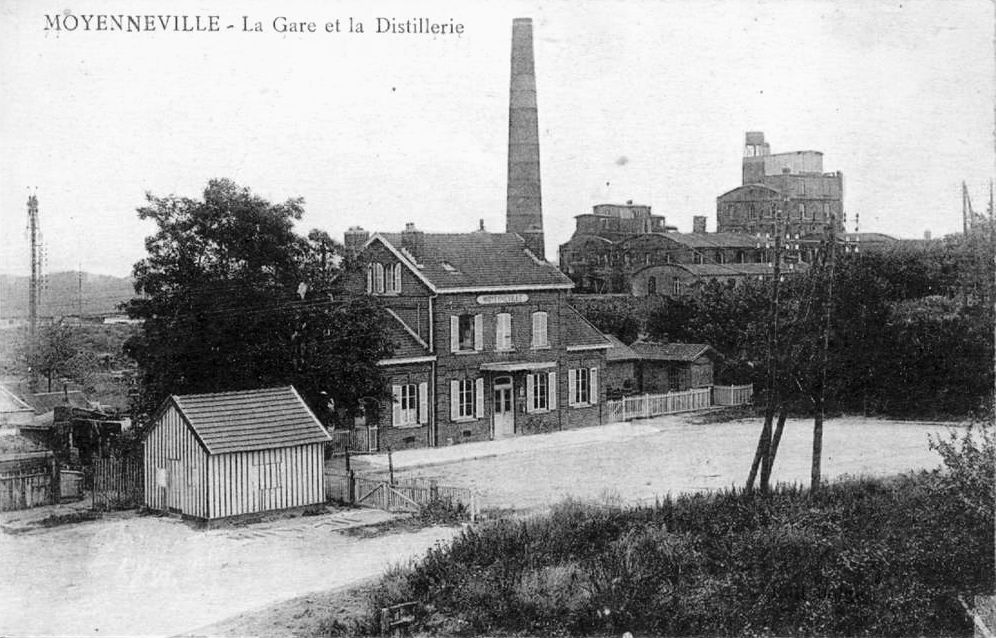
- The railway station and distillery in Moyenneville
- Location of Moyenneville
- Location within France Location within Hauts-de-France
- Coordinates: 49°29′29″N 2°38′14″E
- Country: France
- Region: Hauts-de-France
- Department: Oise
- Arrondissement: Clermont
- Canton: Estrées-Saint-Denis
- Intercommunality: Plateau Picard

Government
  - Mayor (2020–2026): Didier Ledent
- Area^{1}: 7.19 km^{2} (2.78 sq mi)
- Elevation: 78 m (256 ft)
- Highest elevation: 100 m (330 ft)
- Lowest elevation: 55 m (180 ft)
- Population (2023): 575
  - Density: 80.0/km^{2} (207/sq mi)
- Time zone: UTC+01:00 (CET)
  - Summer (DST): UTC+02:00 (CEST)
- INSEE/Postal code: 60440 /60190
- ^{1} French Land Register data, which excludes lakes, ponds, glaciers > 1 km^{2} (0.386 sq mi or 247 acres) and river estuaries.

Moyenneville (French pronunciation: [mwajɛnvil]) is a commune in the Oise department in northern France.

== See also ==
- Communes of the Oise department
