= Bucamps =

- Commune
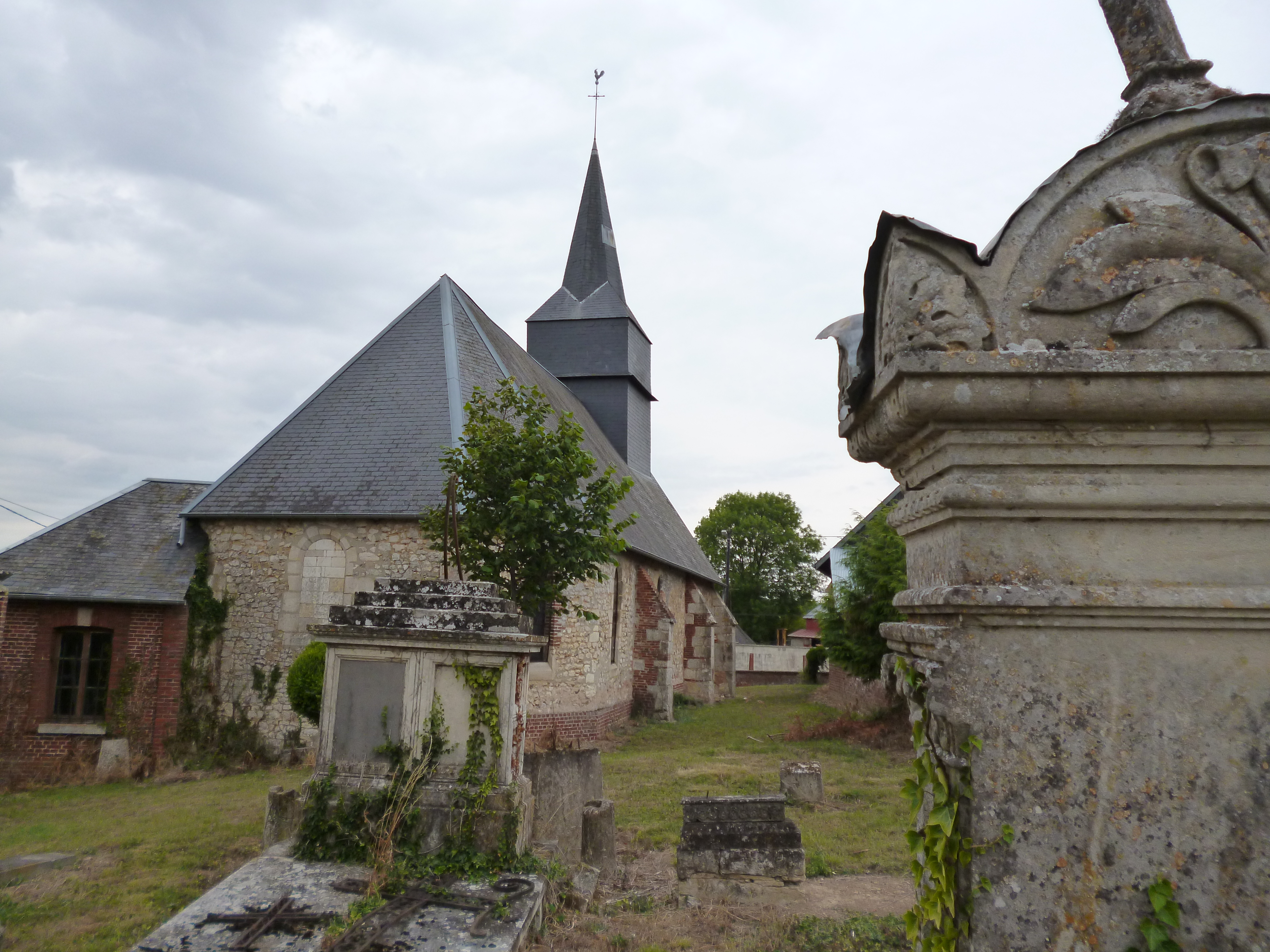
- The church in Bucamps
- Location of Bucamps
- Location within France Location within Hauts-de-France
- Coordinates: 49°31′23″N 2°19′21″E
- Country: France
- Region: Hauts-de-France
- Department: Oise
- Arrondissement: Clermont
- Canton: Saint-Just-en-Chaussée

Government
  - Mayor (2020–2026): Francis Menu
- Area^{1}: 5.82 km^{2} (2.25 sq mi)
- Elevation: 110 m (360 ft)
- Highest elevation: 169 m (554 ft)
- Lowest elevation: 103 m (338 ft)
- Population (2023): 209
  - Density: 35.9/km^{2} (93.0/sq mi)
- Time zone: UTC+01:00 (CET)
  - Summer (DST): UTC+02:00 (CEST)
- INSEE/Postal code: 60113 /60480
- ^{1} French Land Register data, which excludes lakes, ponds, glaciers > 1 km^{2} (0.386 sq mi or 247 acres) and river estuaries.

Bucamps (French pronunciation: [bykɑ̃]) is a commune in the Oise department in northern France.

== Population ==
Historical population
| Year | Pop. | ±% p.a. |
|---|---|---|
| 1968 | 112 | — |
| 1975 | 76 | −5.39% |
| 1982 | 78 | +0.37% |
| 1990 | 117 | +5.20% |
| 1999 | 128 | +1.00% |
| 2007 | 148 | +1.83% |
| 2012 | 173 | +3.17% |
| 2017 | 188 | +1.68% |
| 2023 | 209 | +1.78% |
Source: INSEE

== See also ==
- Communes of the Oise department
