= Wavignies =

- Commune
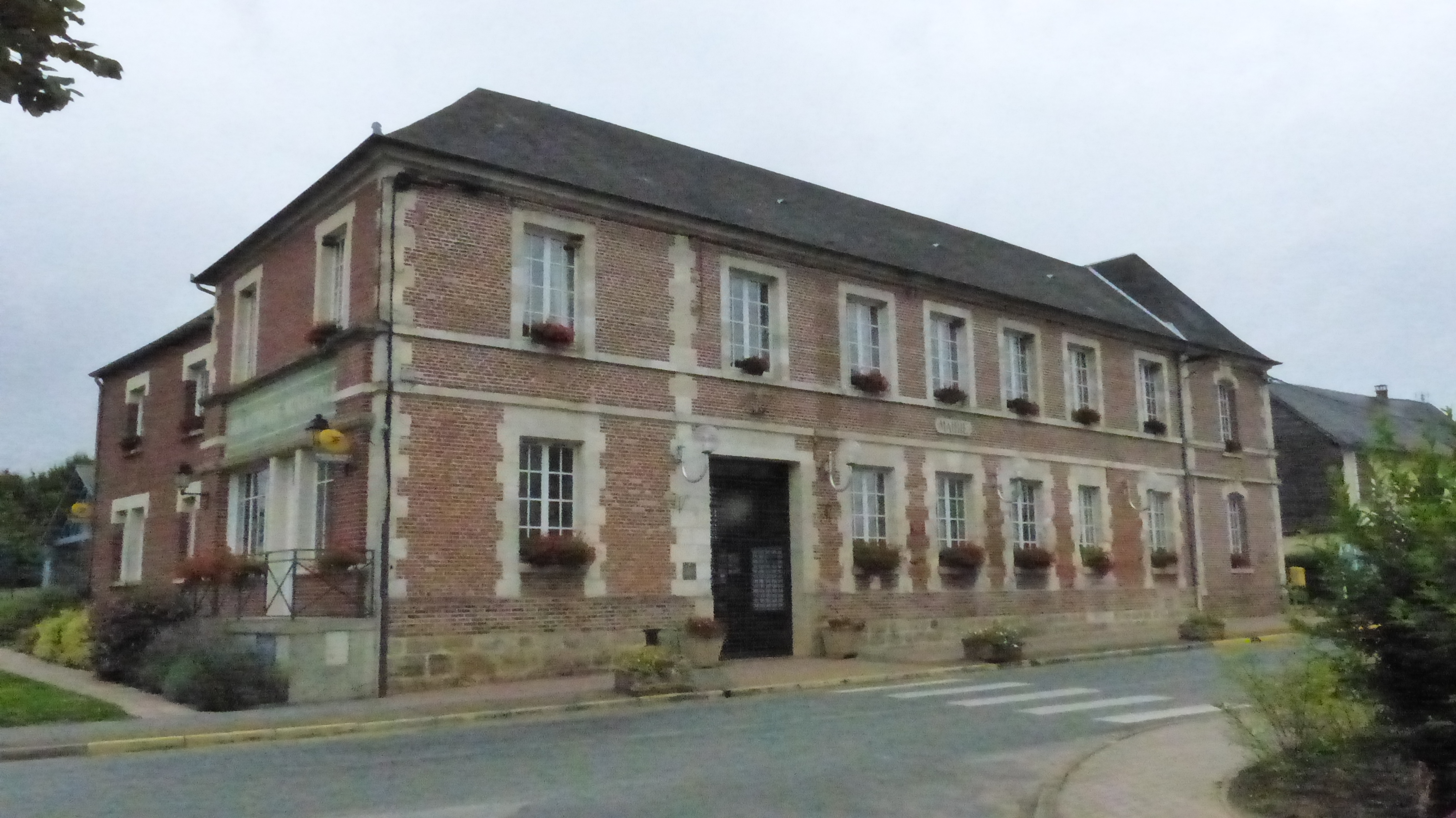
- The town hall in Wavignies

- Coat of arms
- Location of Wavignies
- Location within France Location within Hauts-de-France
- Coordinates: 49°32′51″N 2°21′36″E
- Country: France
- Region: Hauts-de-France
- Department: Oise
- Arrondissement: Clermont
- Canton: Saint-Just-en-Chaussée
- Intercommunality: Plateau Picard

Government
  - Mayor (2020–2026): André Renaux
- Area^{1}: 9.81 km^{2} (3.79 sq mi)
- Elevation: 143 m (469 ft)
- Highest elevation: 158 m (518 ft)
- Lowest elevation: 110 m (360 ft)
- Population (2023): 1,341
  - Density: 137/km^{2} (354/sq mi)
- Time zone: UTC+01:00 (CET)
  - Summer (DST): UTC+02:00 (CEST)
- INSEE/Postal code: 60701 /60130
- ^{1} French Land Register data, which excludes lakes, ponds, glaciers > 1 km^{2} (0.386 sq mi or 247 acres) and river estuaries.

Wavignies (French pronunciation: [waviɲi]) is a commune in the Oise department in northern France.

== Population ==
Historical population
| Year | Pop. | ±% p.a. |
|---|---|---|
| 1968 | 705 | — |
| 1975 | 711 | +0.12% |
| 1982 | 631 | −1.69% |
| 1990 | 818 | +3.30% |
| 1999 | 981 | +2.04% |
| 2007 | 1,069 | +1.08% |
| 2012 | 1,210 | +2.51% |
| 2017 | 1,212 | +0.03% |
| 2023 | 1,341 | +1.70% |
Source: INSEE

== See also ==
- Communes of the Oise department
