= Arrondissement of Clermont =

Coordinates: 49°23′N 2°25′E

Clermont
- Arrondissement
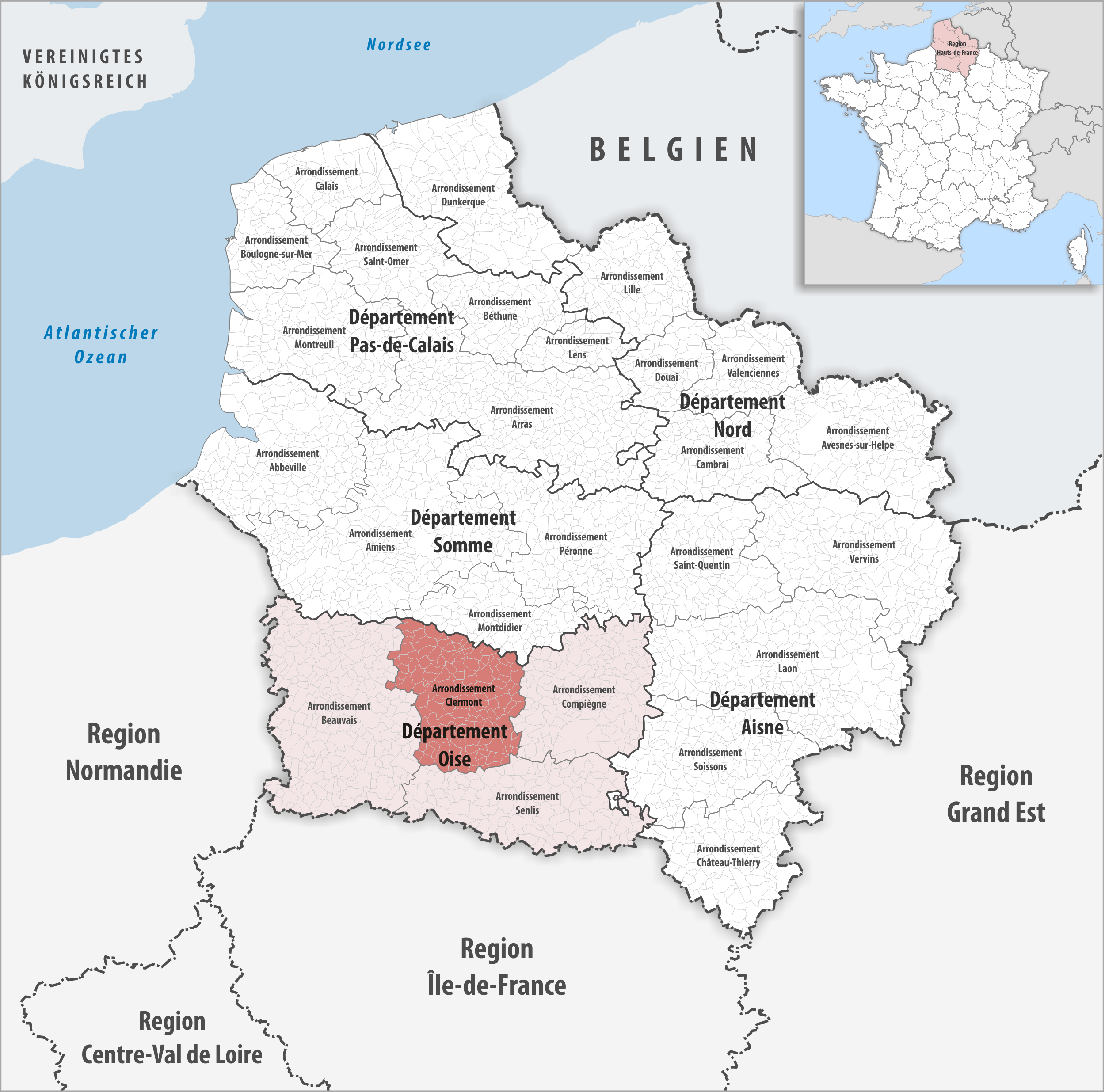
- Location within the region Hauts-de-France
- Country: France
- Region: Hauts-de-France
- Department: Oise
- No. of communes: {{{nbcomm}}}
- Area: 1,141.7 km^{2} (440.8 sq mi)
- Population (2023): 130,261
  - Density: 114.09/km^{2} (295.50/sq mi)
- INSEE code: 602

The arrondissement of Clermont is an arrondissement of France in the Oise departement in the Hauts-de-France region. It has 146 communes. Its population is 130,735 (2021), and its area is 1,141.7 km^{2} (440.8 sq mi).

== Composition ==
The communes of the arrondissement of Clermont, and their INSEE codes, are:

1. Abbeville-Saint-Lucien (60003)
2. Les Ageux (60006)
3. Agnetz (60007)
4. Airion (60008)
5. Angicourt (60013)
6. Angivillers (60014)
7. Angy (60015)
8. Ansacq (60016)
9. Ansauvillers (60017)
10. Avrechy (60034)
11. Avrigny (60036)
12. Bacouël (60039)
13. Bailleul-le-Soc (60040)
14. Bailleval (60042)
15. Bazicourt (60050)
16. Beauvoir (60058)
17. Blincourt (60078)
18. Bonneuil-les-Eaux (60082)
19. Bonvillers (60085)
20. Brenouille (60102)
21. Breteuil (60104)
22. Breuil-le-Sec (60106)
23. Breuil-le-Vert (60107)
24. Broyes (60111)
25. Brunvillers-la-Motte (60112)
26. Bucamps (60113)
27. Bulles (60115)
28. Bury (60116)
29. Cambronne-lès-Clermont (60120)
30. Campremy (60123)
31. Catenoy (60130)
32. Catillon-Fumechon (60133)
33. Cauffry (60134)
34. Cernoy (60137)
35. Chepoix (60146)
36. Choisy-la-Victoire (60152)
37. Cinqueux (60154)
38. Clermont (60157)
39. Coivrel (60158)
40. Courcelles-Epayelles (60168)
41. Cressonsacq (60177)
42. Crèvecœur-le-Petit (60179)
43. Cuignières (60186)
44. Domfront (60200)
45. Dompierre (60201)
46. Épineuse (60210)
47. Erquery (60215)
48. Erquinvillers (60216)
49. Esquennoy (60221)
50. Essuiles (60222)
51. Étouy (60225)
52. Ferrières (60232)
53. Fitz-James (60234)
54. Fléchy (60237)
55. Fouilleuse (60247)
56. Fournival (60252)
57. Le Frestoy-Vaux (60262)
58. Froissy (60265)
59. Gannes (60268)
60. Godenvillers (60276)
61. Gouy-les-Groseillers (60283)
62. Grandvillers-aux-Bois (60285)
63. Hardivillers (60299)
64. Heilles (60307)
65. La Hérelle (60311)
66. Hondainville (60317)
67. Labruyère (60332)
68. Laigneville (60342)
69. Lamécourt (60345)
70. Léglantiers (60357)
71. Liancourt (60360)
72. Lieuvillers (60364)
73. Litz (60366)
74. Maignelay-Montigny (60374)
75. Maimbeville (60375)
76. Maisoncelle-Tuilerie (60377)
77. Ménévillers (60394)
78. Méry-la-Bataille (60396)
79. Le Mesnil-Saint-Firmin (60399)
80. Le Mesnil-sur-Bulles (60400)
81. Mogneville (60404)
82. Monceaux (60406)
83. Monchy-Saint-Éloi (60409)
84. Montgérain (60416)
85. Montiers (60418)
86. Montreuil-sur-Brêche (60425)
87. Mory-Montcrux (60436)
88. Mouy (60439)
89. Moyenneville (60440)
90. Neuilly-sous-Clermont (60451)
91. La Neuville-en-Hez (60454)
92. La Neuville-Roy (60456)
93. La Neuville-Saint-Pierre (60457)
94. Nointel (60464)
95. Noirémont (60465)
96. Noroy (60466)
97. Nourard-le-Franc (60468)
98. Noyers-Saint-Martin (60470)
99. Oursel-Maison (60485)
100. Paillart (60486)
101. Plainval (60495)
102. Plainville (60496)
103. Le Plessier-sur-Bulles (60497)
104. Le Plessier-sur-Saint-Just (60498)
105. Le Ployron (60503)
106. Pronleroy (60515)
107. Puits-la-Vallée (60518)
108. Le Quesnel-Aubry (60520)
109. Quinquempoix (60522)
110. Rantigny (60524)
111. Ravenel (60526)
112. Rémécourt (60529)
113. Rémérangles (60530)
114. Reuil-sur-Brêche (60535)
115. Rieux (60539)
116. Rocquencourt (60544)
117. Rosoy (60547)
118. Rousseloy (60551)
119. Rouvillers (60553)
120. Rouvroy-les-Merles (60555)
121. Royaucourt (60556)
122. La Rue-Saint-Pierre (60559)
123. Sacy-le-Grand (60562)
124. Sacy-le-Petit (60563)
125. Sains-Morainvillers (60564)
126. Saint-André-Farivillers (60565)
127. Saint-Aubin-sous-Erquery (60568)
128. Sainte-Eusoye (60573)
129. Saint-Félix (60574)
130. Saint-Just-en-Chaussée (60581)
131. Saint-Martin-aux-Bois (60585)
132. Saint-Martin-Longueau (60587)
133. Saint-Remy-en-l'Eau (60595)
134. Sérévillers (60615)
135. Tartigny (60627)
136. Thieux (60634)
137. Thury-sous-Clermont (60638)
138. Tricot (60643)
139. Troussencourt (60648)
140. Valescourt (60653)
141. Vendeuil-Caply (60664)
142. Verderonne (60669)
143. Villers-Vicomte (60692)
144. Wacquemoulin (60698)
145. Wavignies (60701)
146. Welles-Pérennes (60702)

== History ==
The arrondissement of Clermont was created in 1800, disbanded in 1926 and restored in 1942.

As a result of the reorganisation of the cantons of France which came into effect in 2015, the borders of the cantons are no longer related to the borders of the arrondissements. The cantons of the arrondissement of Clermont were, as of January 2015:

1. Breteuil
2. Clermont
3. Froissy
4. Liancourt
5. Maignelay-Montigny
6. Mouy
7. Saint-Just-en-Chaussée

== Sub-prefects ==
- Richard Samuel: on 2 May 1988
