= Ferrières, Oise =

Ferrières
- Commune
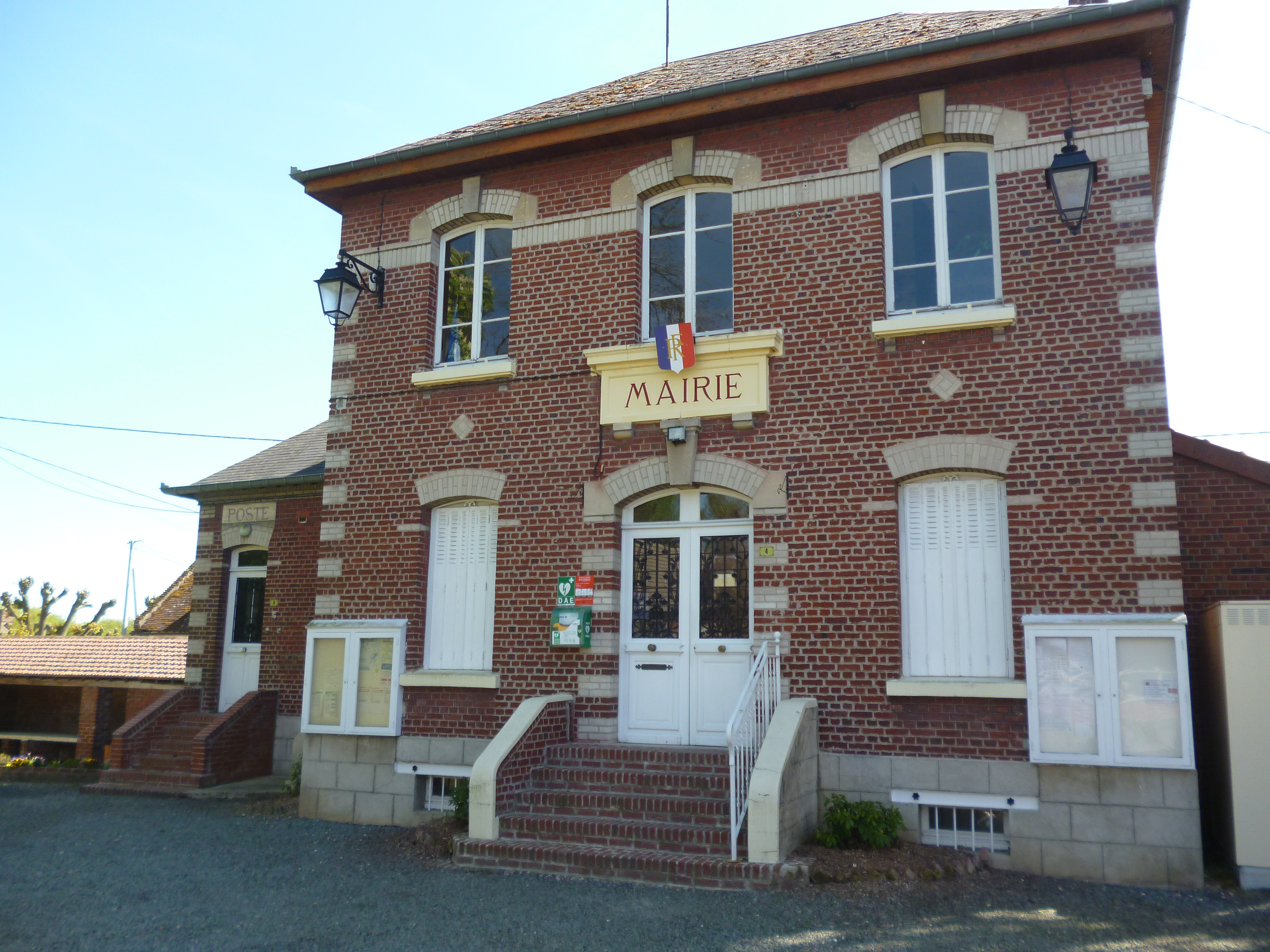
- The town hall in Ferrières
- Location of Ferrières
- Location within France Location within Hauts-de-France
- Coordinates: 49°35′25″N 2°31′11″E
- Country: France
- Region: Hauts-de-France
- Department: Oise
- Arrondissement: Clermont
- Canton: Estrées-Saint-Denis
- Intercommunality: Plateau Picard

Government
  - Mayor (2020–2026): Stéphanie Dupont
- Area^{1}: 4.81 km^{2} (1.86 sq mi)
- Elevation: 87 m (285 ft)
- Highest elevation: 129 m (423 ft)
- Lowest elevation: 88 m (289 ft)
- Population (2023): 435
  - Density: 90.4/km^{2} (234/sq mi)
- Time zone: UTC+01:00 (CET)
  - Summer (DST): UTC+02:00 (CEST)
- INSEE/Postal code: 60232 /60420
- ^{1} French Land Register data, which excludes lakes, ponds, glaciers > 1 km^{2} (0.386 sq mi or 247 acres) and river estuaries.

Ferrières (French pronunciation: [fɛʁjɛʁ]) is a commune in the Oise department in northern France.

== See also ==
- Communes of the Oise department
