= Bailleul-le-Soc =

- Commune
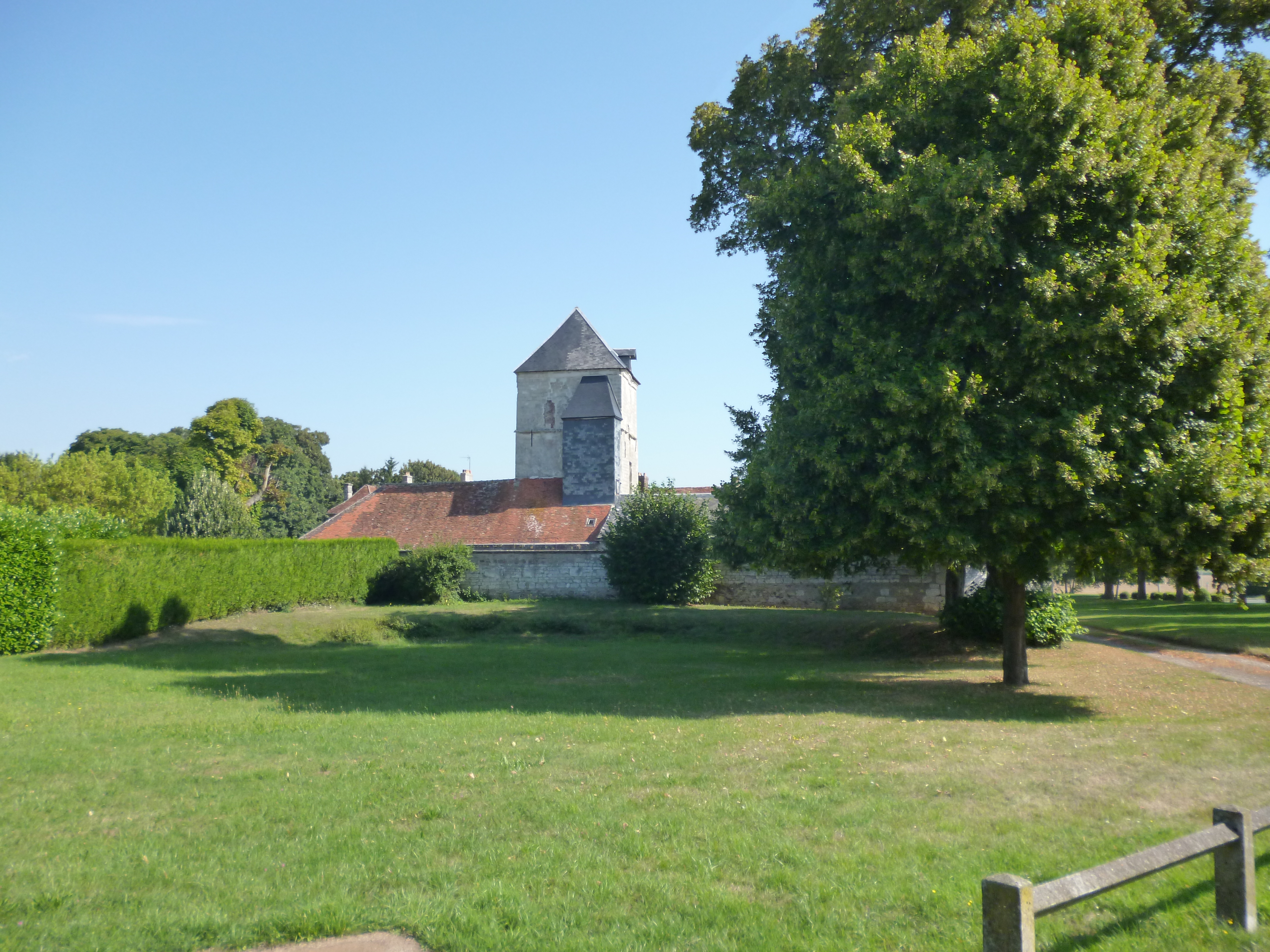
- The square tower of Eraine Farm
- Location of Bailleul-le-Soc
- Location within France Location within Hauts-de-France
- Coordinates: 49°25′04″N 2°34′43″E
- Country: France
- Region: Hauts-de-France
- Department: Oise
- Arrondissement: Clermont
- Canton: Estrées-Saint-Denis
- Intercommunality: Plaine d'Estrées

Government
  - Mayor (2020–2026): Wilfrid Blois
- Area^{1}: 14.14 km^{2} (5.46 sq mi)
- Elevation: 120 m (390 ft)
- Highest elevation: 145 m (476 ft)
- Lowest elevation: 84 m (276 ft)
- Population (2023): 645
  - Density: 45.6/km^{2} (118/sq mi)
- Time zone: UTC+01:00 (CET)
  - Summer (DST): UTC+02:00 (CEST)
- INSEE/Postal code: 60040 /60190
- ^{1} French Land Register data, which excludes lakes, ponds, glaciers > 1 km^{2} (0.386 sq mi or 247 acres) and river estuaries.

Bailleul-le-Soc (French pronunciation: [bajœl lə sɔk]) is a commune in the Oise department in northern France.

== Population ==
Historical population
Year	Pop.	±% p.a.
1968	463	—
1975	414	−1.59%
1982	431	+0.58%
1990	571	+3.58%
1999	648	+1.42%
2007	659	+0.21%
2012	654	−0.15%
2017	642	−0.37%
2023	645	+0.08%
Source: INSEE

== See also ==
- Communes of the Oise department
