= Montreuil-sur-Brêche =

- Commune
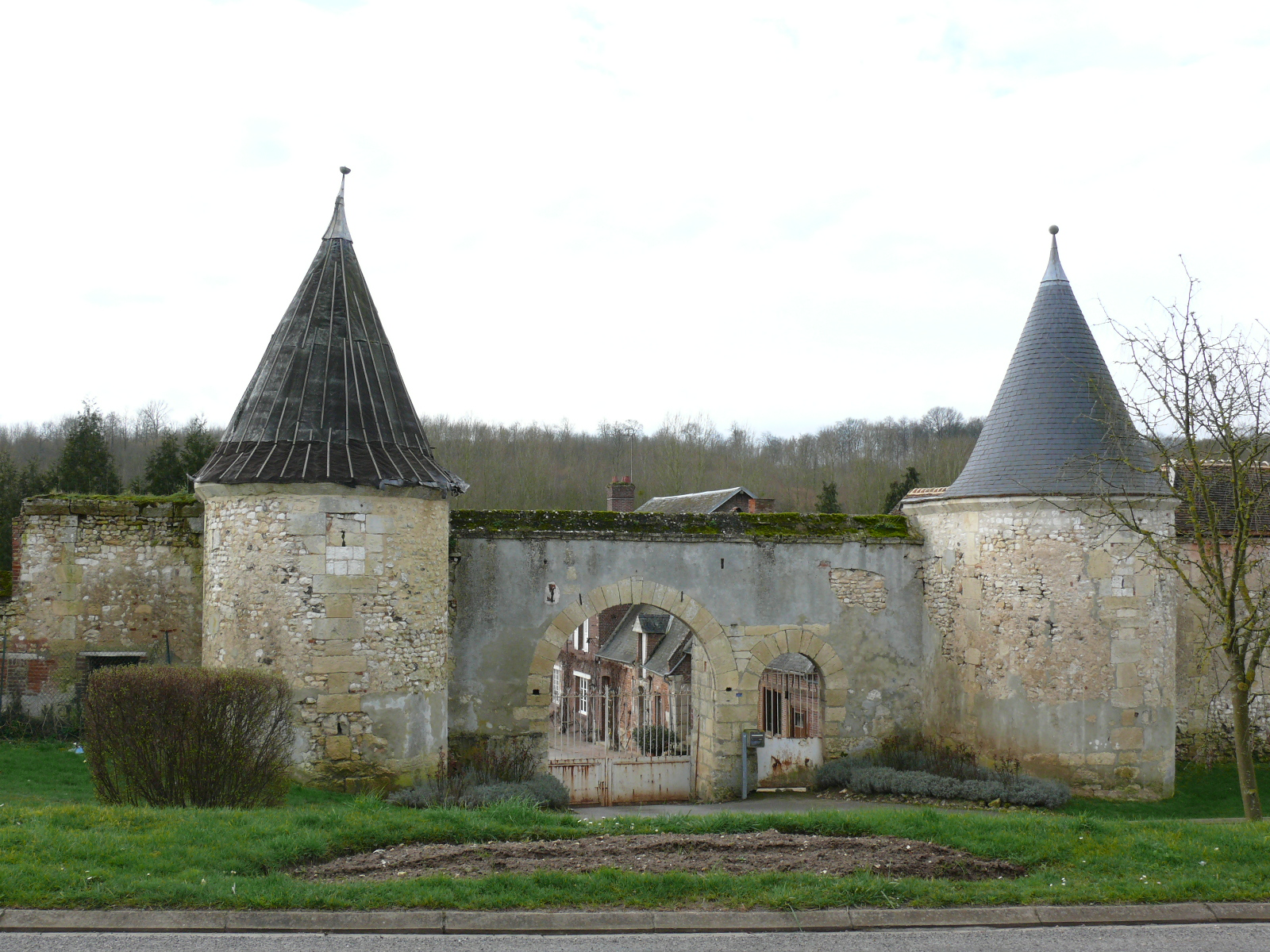
- The fortified manor of Ponceaux in Montreuil-sur-Breche
- Location of Montreuil-sur-Brêche
- Location within France Location within Hauts-de-France
- Coordinates: 49°30′31″N 2°16′33″E
- Country: France
- Region: Hauts-de-France
- Department: Oise
- Arrondissement: Clermont
- Canton: Saint-Just-en-Chaussée

Government
  - Mayor (2020–2026): Patrick Guibon
- Area^{1}: 10.53 km^{2} (4.07 sq mi)
- Elevation: 98 m (322 ft)
- Highest elevation: 164 m (538 ft)
- Lowest elevation: 90 m (300 ft)
- Population (2023): 497
  - Density: 47.2/km^{2} (122/sq mi)
- Time zone: UTC+01:00 (CET)
  - Summer (DST): UTC+02:00 (CEST)
- INSEE/Postal code: 60425 /60480
- ^{1} French Land Register data, which excludes lakes, ponds, glaciers > 1 km^{2} (0.386 sq mi or 247 acres) and river estuaries.

Montreuil-sur-Brêche (French pronunciation: [mɔ̃tʁœj syʁ bʁɛʃ]) is a commune in the Oise department in northern France.

== See also ==
- Communes of the Oise department
