= Quinquempoix =

- Commune
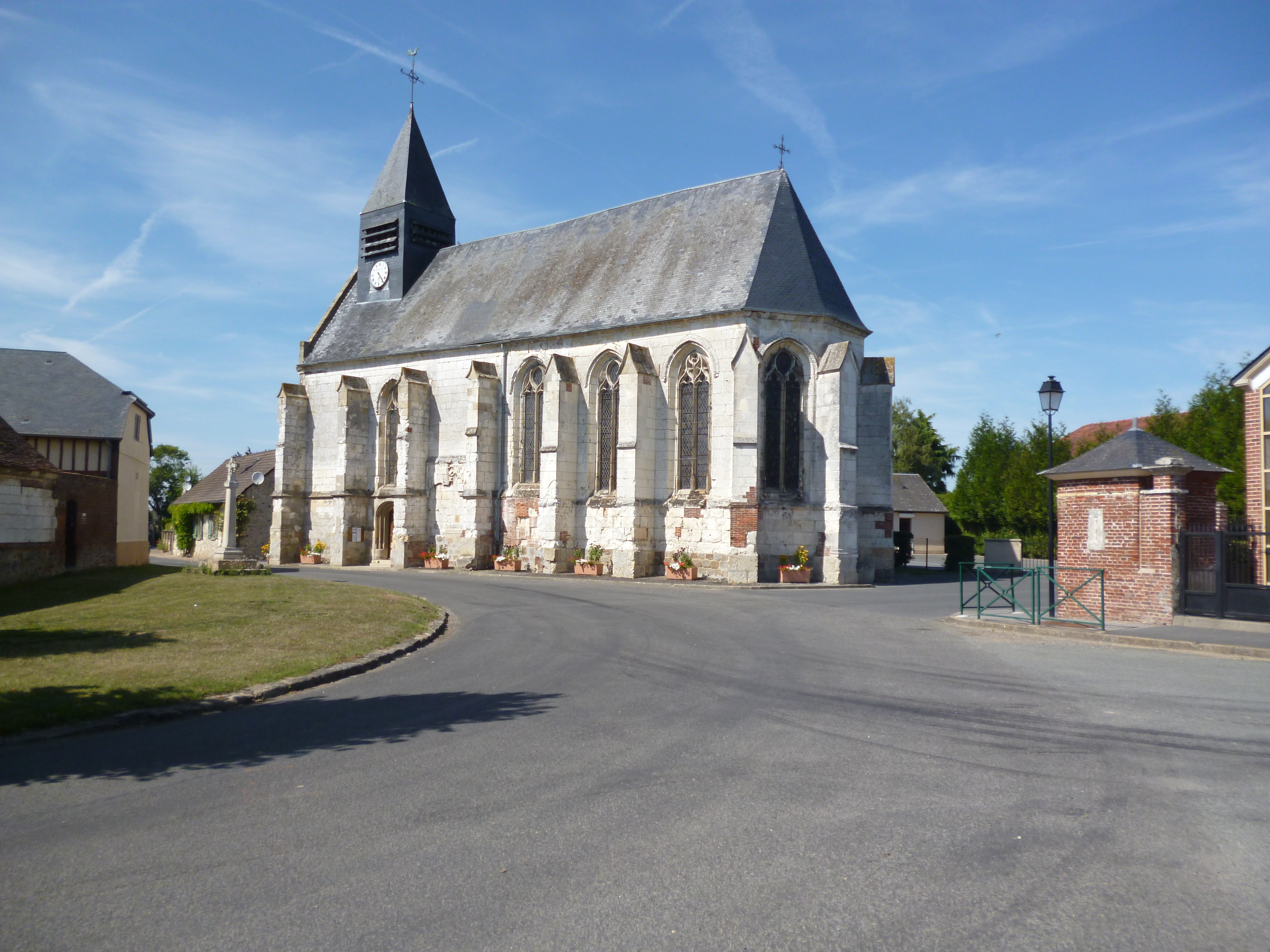
- The church in Quinquempoix
- Location of Quinquempoix
- Location within France Location within Hauts-de-France
- Coordinates: 49°33′08″N 2°25′38″E
- Country: France
- Region: Hauts-de-France
- Department: Oise
- Arrondissement: Clermont
- Canton: Saint-Just-en-Chaussée
- Intercommunality: Plateau Picard

Government
  - Mayor (2020–2026): Alain Baudin
- Area^{1}: 5.86 km^{2} (2.26 sq mi)
- Elevation: 132 m (433 ft)
- Highest elevation: 139 m (456 ft)
- Lowest elevation: 99 m (325 ft)
- Population (2023): 320
  - Density: 55/km^{2} (140/sq mi)
- Time zone: UTC+01:00 (CET)
  - Summer (DST): UTC+02:00 (CEST)
- INSEE/Postal code: 60522 /60130
- ^{1} French Land Register data, which excludes lakes, ponds, glaciers > 1 km^{2} (0.386 sq mi or 247 acres) and river estuaries.

Quinquempoix (French pronunciation: [kɛ̃kɑ̃pwa]) is a commune in the Oise department in northern France.

== See also ==
- Communes of the Oise department
