= Villers-Vicomte =

- Commune
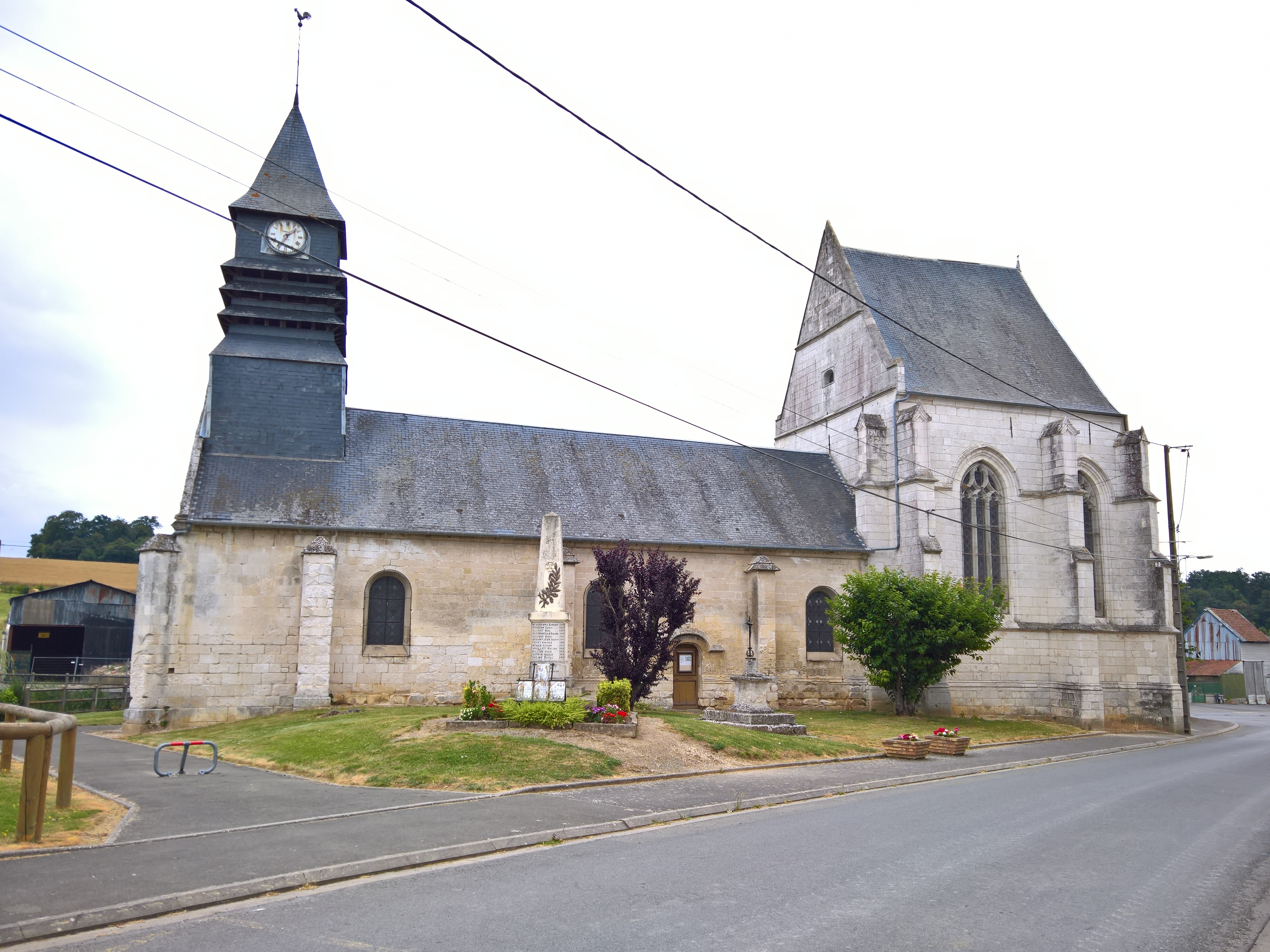
- The church in Villers-Vicomte
- Location of Villers-Vicomte
- Location within France Location within Hauts-de-France
- Coordinates: 49°38′38″N 2°14′24″E
- Country: France
- Region: Hauts-de-France
- Department: Oise
- Arrondissement: Clermont
- Canton: Saint-Just-en-Chaussée

Government
  - Mayor (2020–2026): Reynald Ouvry
- Area^{1}: 5.2 km^{2} (2.0 sq mi)
- Elevation: 120 m (390 ft)
- Highest elevation: 176 m (577 ft)
- Lowest elevation: 112 m (367 ft)
- Population (2023): 162
  - Density: 31/km^{2} (81/sq mi)
- Time zone: UTC+01:00 (CET)
  - Summer (DST): UTC+02:00 (CEST)
- INSEE/Postal code: 60692 /60120
- ^{1} French Land Register data, which excludes lakes, ponds, glaciers > 1 km^{2} (0.386 sq mi or 247 acres) and river estuaries.

Villers-Vicomte (French pronunciation: [vilɛʁ vikɔ̃t]) is a commune in the Oise department in northern France.

== See also ==
- Communes of the Oise department
