= Le Quesnel-Aubry =

- Commune
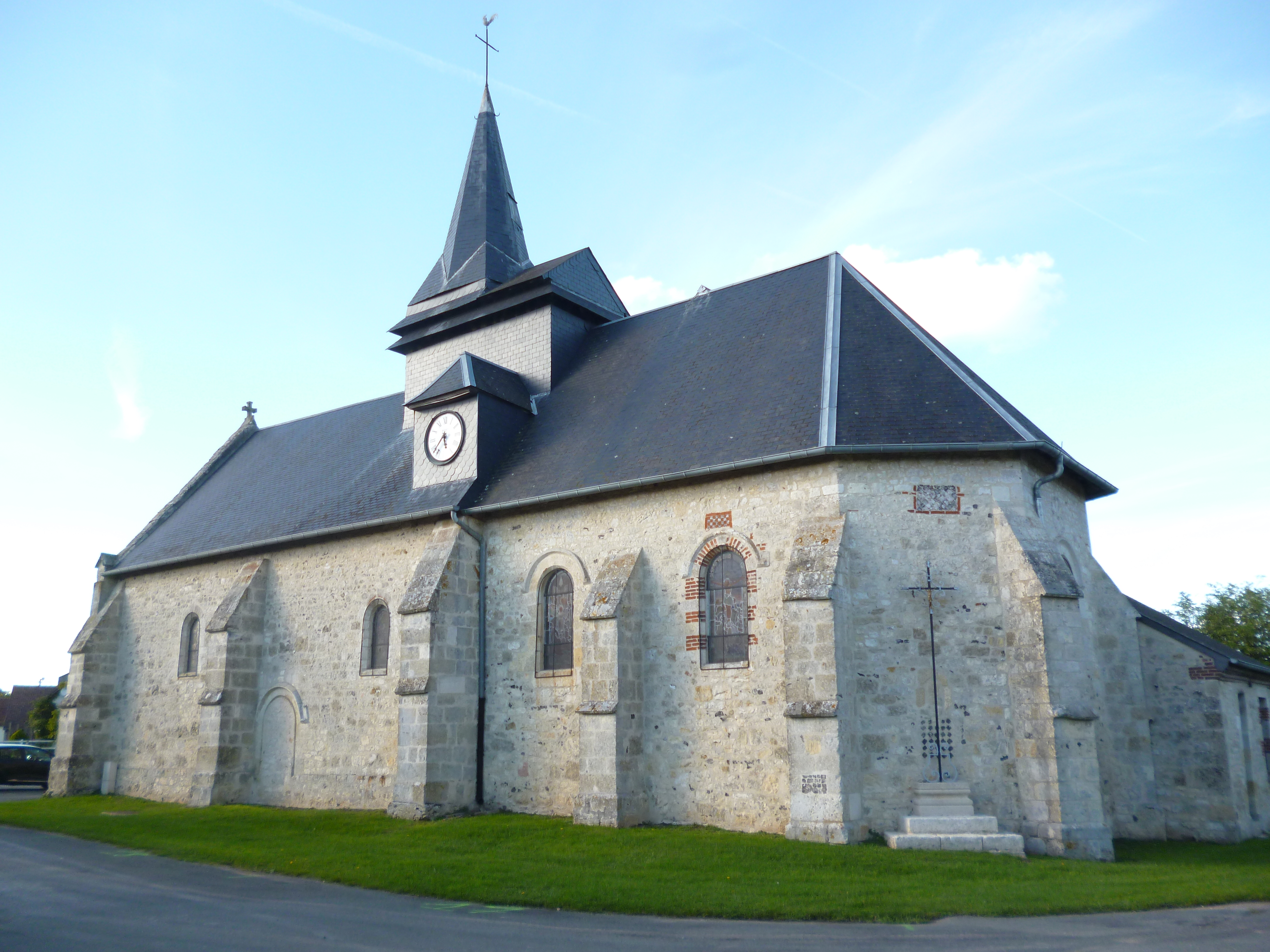
- The church in Le Quesnel-Aubry
- Location of Le Quesnel-Aubry
- Location within France Location within Hauts-de-France
- Coordinates: 49°30′34″N 2°18′37″E
- Country: France
- Region: Hauts-de-France
- Department: Oise
- Arrondissement: Clermont
- Canton: Saint-Just-en-Chaussée

Government
  - Mayor (2020–2026): Émilie Dubourget
- Area^{1}: 4.75 km^{2} (1.83 sq mi)
- Elevation: 158 m (518 ft)
- Highest elevation: 164 m (538 ft)
- Lowest elevation: 89 m (292 ft)
- Population (2023): 217
  - Density: 45.7/km^{2} (118/sq mi)
- Time zone: UTC+01:00 (CET)
  - Summer (DST): UTC+02:00 (CEST)
- INSEE/Postal code: 60520 /60480
- ^{1} French Land Register data, which excludes lakes, ponds, glaciers > 1 km^{2} (0.386 sq mi or 247 acres) and river estuaries.

Le Quesnel-Aubry (French pronunciation: [lə kenɛl obʁi]) is a commune in the Oise department in northern France.

== See also ==
- Communes of the Oise department
