= Noyers-Saint-Martin =

- Commune
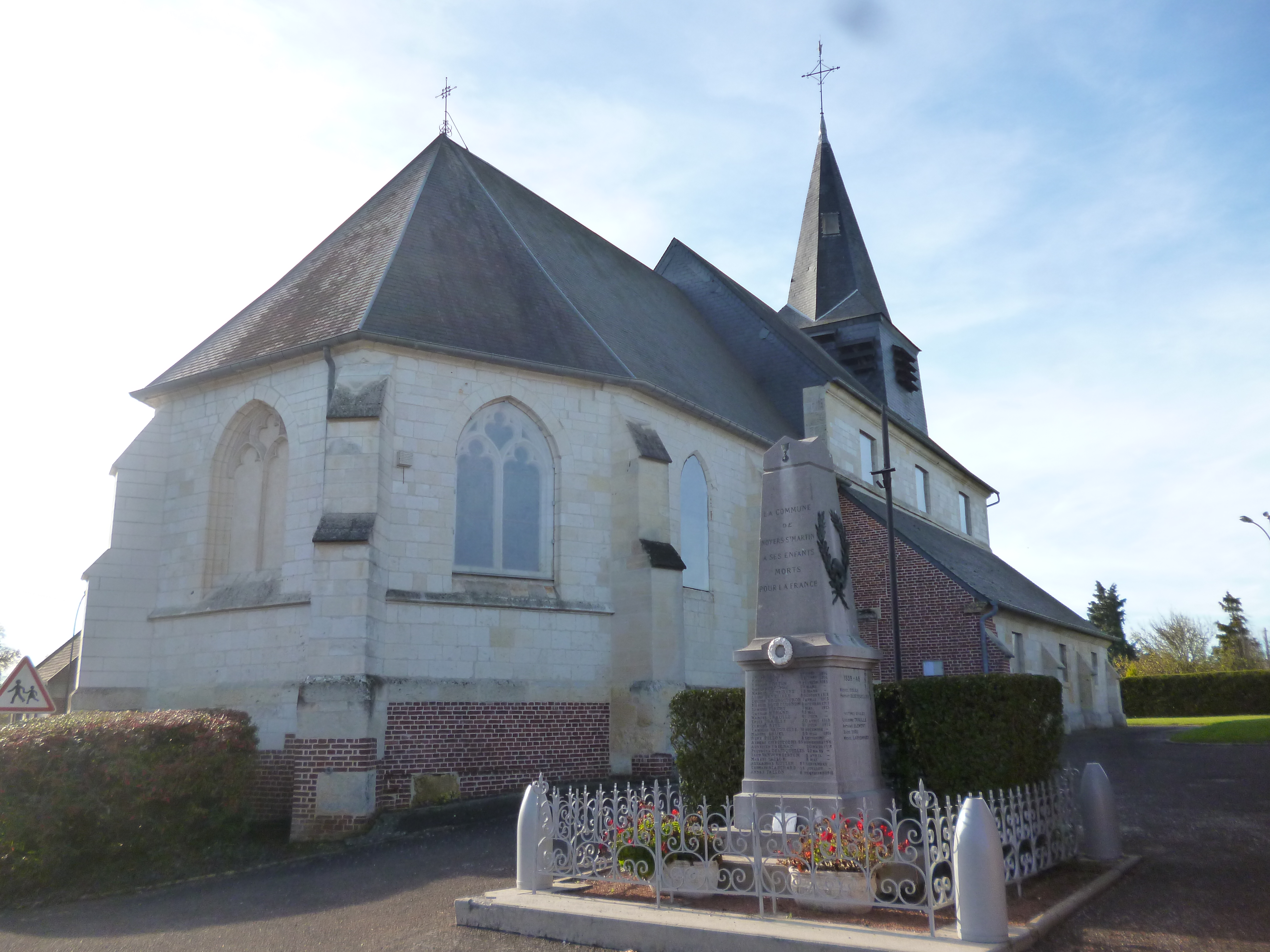
- The church in Noyers-Saint-Martin
- Location of Noyers-Saint-Martin
- Location within France Location within Hauts-de-France
- Coordinates: 49°33′13″N 2°15′46″E
- Country: France
- Region: Hauts-de-France
- Department: Oise
- Arrondissement: Clermont
- Canton: Saint-Just-en-Chaussée

Government
  - Mayor (2020–2026): Jacques Teinielle
- Area^{1}: 13.27 km^{2} (5.12 sq mi)
- Elevation: 165 m (541 ft)
- Highest elevation: 179 m (587 ft)
- Lowest elevation: 118 m (387 ft)
- Population (2023): 887
  - Density: 66.8/km^{2} (173/sq mi)
- Time zone: UTC+01:00 (CET)
  - Summer (DST): UTC+02:00 (CEST)
- INSEE/Postal code: 60470 /60480
- ^{1} French Land Register data, which excludes lakes, ponds, glaciers > 1 km^{2} (0.386 sq mi or 247 acres) and river estuaries.

Noyers-Saint-Martin (French pronunciation: [nwaje sɛ̃ maʁtɛ̃]) is a commune in the Oise department in northern France.

== See also ==
- Communes of the Oise department
