= Vendeuil-Caply =

- Commune
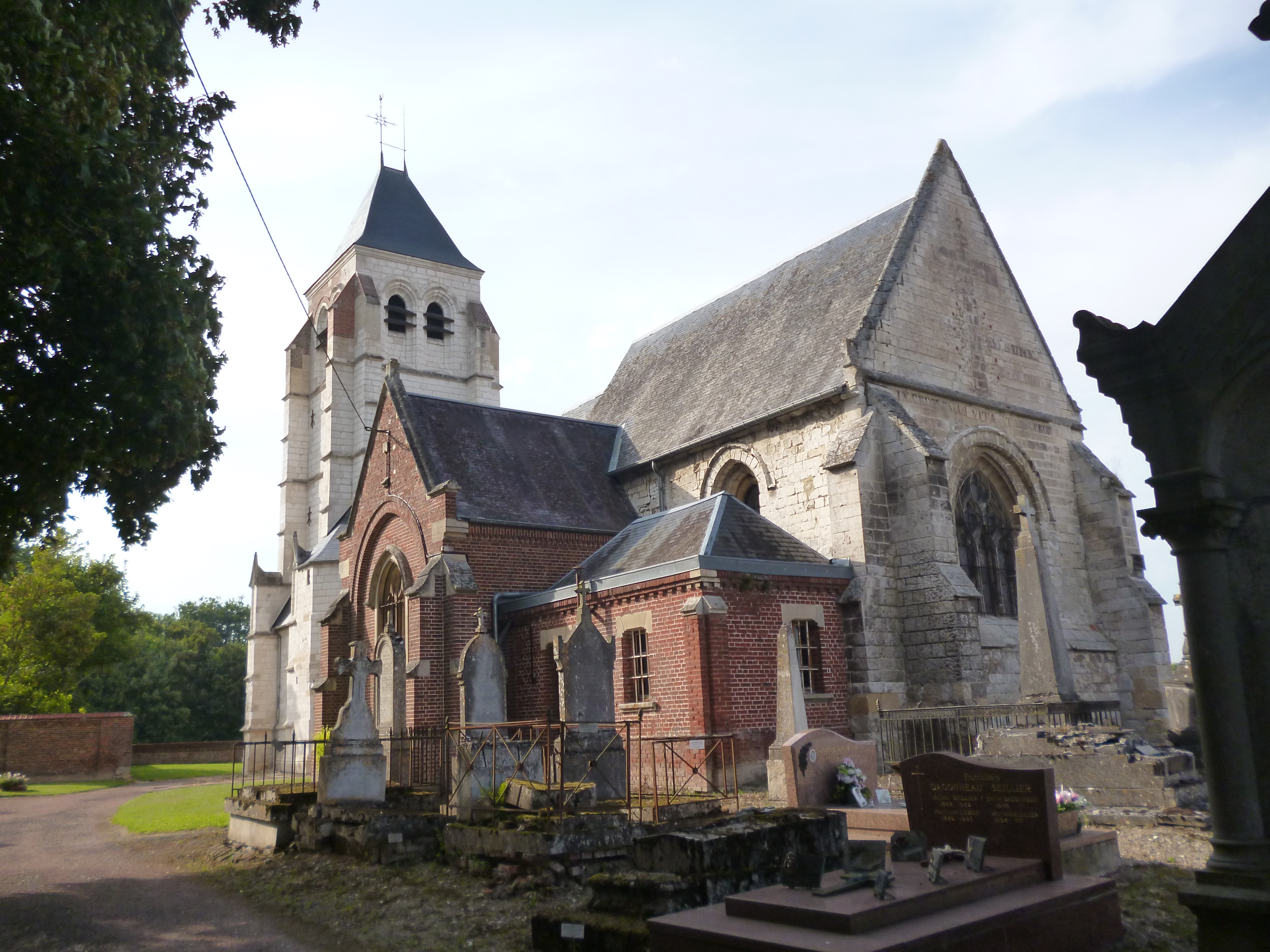
- The church in Vendeuil-Caply
- Location of Vendeuil-Caply
- Location within France Location within Hauts-de-France
- Coordinates: 49°36′29″N 2°17′24″E
- Country: France
- Region: Hauts-de-France
- Department: Oise
- Arrondissement: Clermont
- Canton: Saint-Just-en-Chaussée

Government
  - Mayor (2024–2026): Marc Van Acker
- Area^{1}: 10.84 km^{2} (4.19 sq mi)
- Elevation: 90 m (300 ft)
- Highest elevation: 157 m (515 ft)
- Lowest elevation: 77 m (253 ft)
- Population (2023): 447
  - Density: 41.2/km^{2} (107/sq mi)
- Time zone: UTC+01:00 (CET)
  - Summer (DST): UTC+02:00 (CEST)
- INSEE/Postal code: 60664 /60120
- ^{1} French Land Register data, which excludes lakes, ponds, glaciers > 1 km^{2} (0.386 sq mi or 247 acres) and river estuaries.

Vendeuil-Caply (French pronunciation: [vɑ̃dœj kapli]) is a commune in the Oise department in northern France.

== See also ==
- Communes of the Oise department
