= Bonneuil-les-Eaux =

- Commune
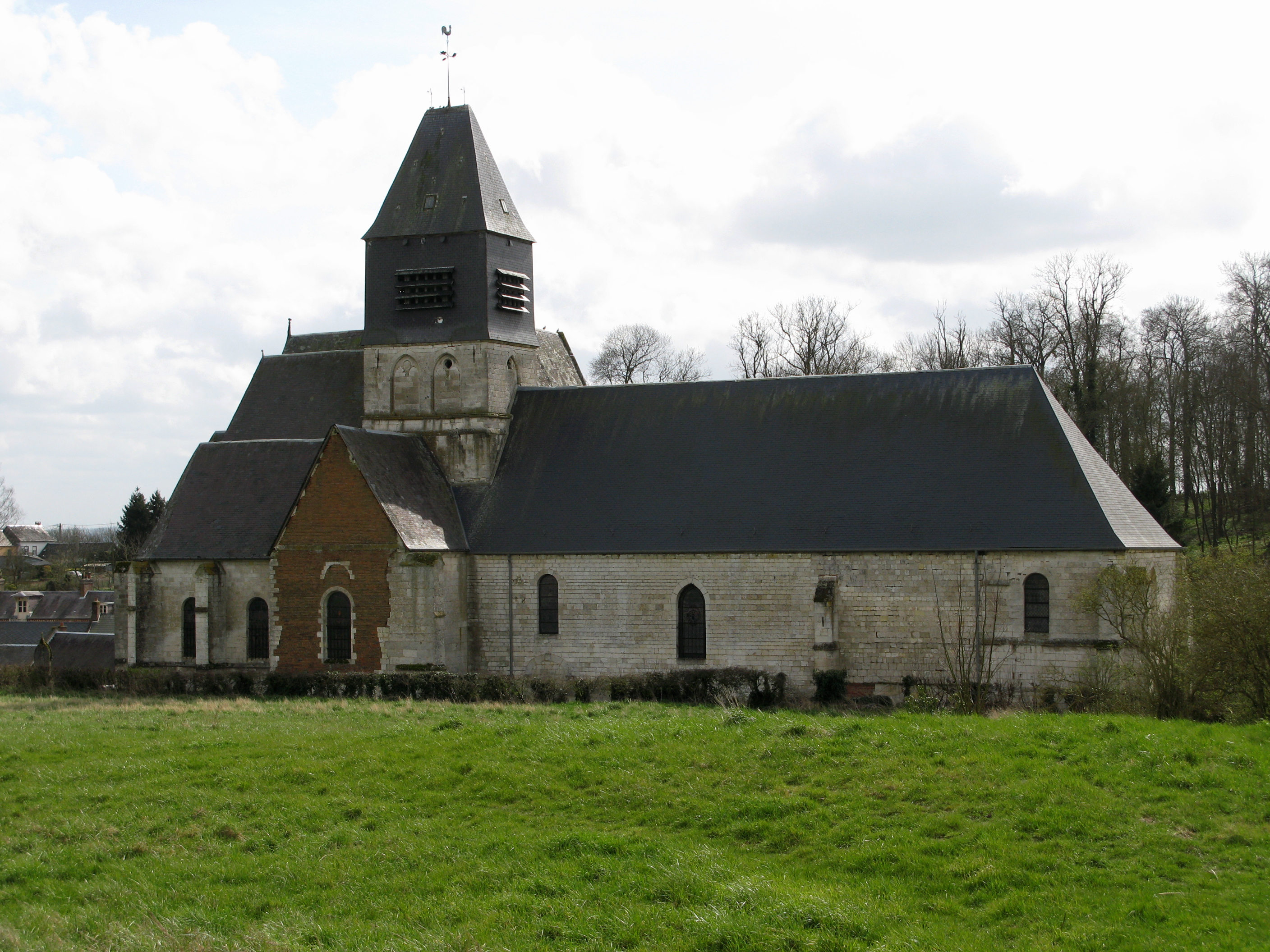
- The church in Bonneuil-les-Eaux
- Location of Bonneuil-les-Eaux
- Location within France Location within Hauts-de-France
- Coordinates: 49°40′43″N 2°14′10″E
- Country: France
- Region: Hauts-de-France
- Department: Oise
- Arrondissement: Clermont
- Canton: Saint-Just-en-Chaussée

Government
  - Mayor (2020–2026): Nicole Cordier
- Area^{1}: 18.29 km^{2} (7.06 sq mi)
- Elevation: 110 m (360 ft)
- Highest elevation: 172 m (564 ft)
- Lowest elevation: 72 m (236 ft)
- Population (2023): 787
  - Density: 43.0/km^{2} (111/sq mi)
- Time zone: UTC+01:00 (CET)
  - Summer (DST): UTC+02:00 (CEST)
- INSEE/Postal code: 60082 /60120
- ^{1} French Land Register data, which excludes lakes, ponds, glaciers > 1 km^{2} (0.386 sq mi or 247 acres) and river estuaries.

Bonneuil-les-Eaux (French pronunciation: [bɔnœj le.z‿o]) is a commune in the Oise department in northern France.

== Population ==
Historical population
Year	Pop.	±% p.a.
1968	672	—
1975	686	+0.29%
1982	694	+0.17%
1990	745	+0.89%
1999	751	+0.09%
2007	803	+0.84%
2012	819	+0.40%
2017	805	−0.34%
2023	787	−0.38%
Source: INSEE

== See also ==
- Communes of the Oise department
