= Thieux, Oise =

Thieux
- Commune
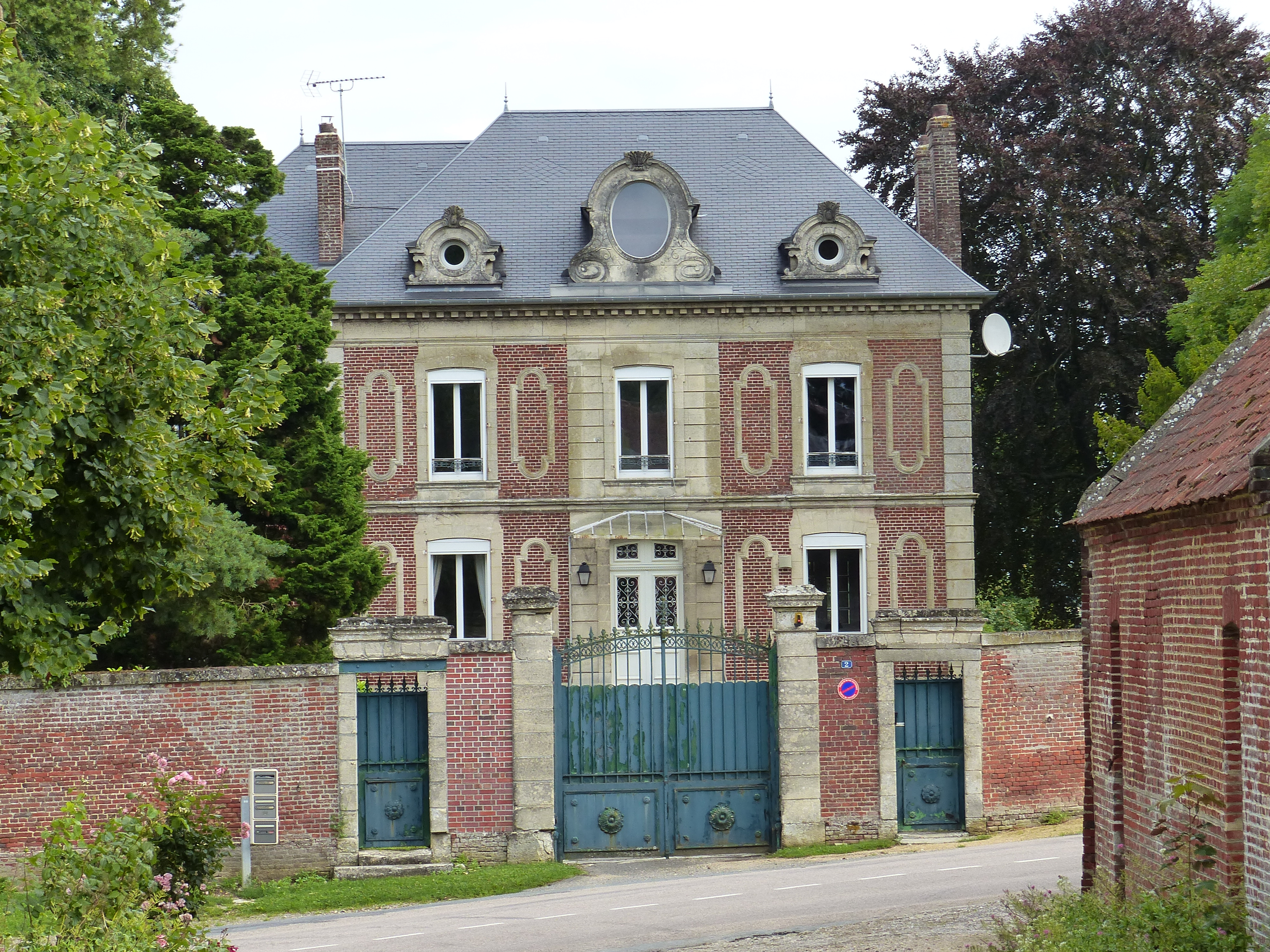
- A mansion in Thieux
- Location of Thieux
- Location within France Location within Hauts-de-France
- Coordinates: 49°32′34″N 2°18′52″E
- Country: France
- Region: Hauts-de-France
- Department: Oise
- Arrondissement: Clermont
- Canton: Saint-Just-en-Chaussée

Government
  - Mayor (2020–2026): Nadine Guigot
- Area^{1}: 9.17 km^{2} (3.54 sq mi)
- Elevation: 149 m (489 ft)
- Highest elevation: 179 m (587 ft)
- Lowest elevation: 123 m (404 ft)
- Population (2023): 438
  - Density: 47.8/km^{2} (124/sq mi)
- Time zone: UTC+01:00 (CET)
  - Summer (DST): UTC+02:00 (CEST)
- INSEE/Postal code: 60634 /60480
- ^{1} French Land Register data, which excludes lakes, ponds, glaciers > 1 km^{2} (0.386 sq mi or 247 acres) and river estuaries.

Thieux (French pronunciation: [tjø]) is a commune in the Oise department in northern France.

== See also ==
- Communes of the Oise department
