= Saint-Remy-en-l'Eau =

- Commune
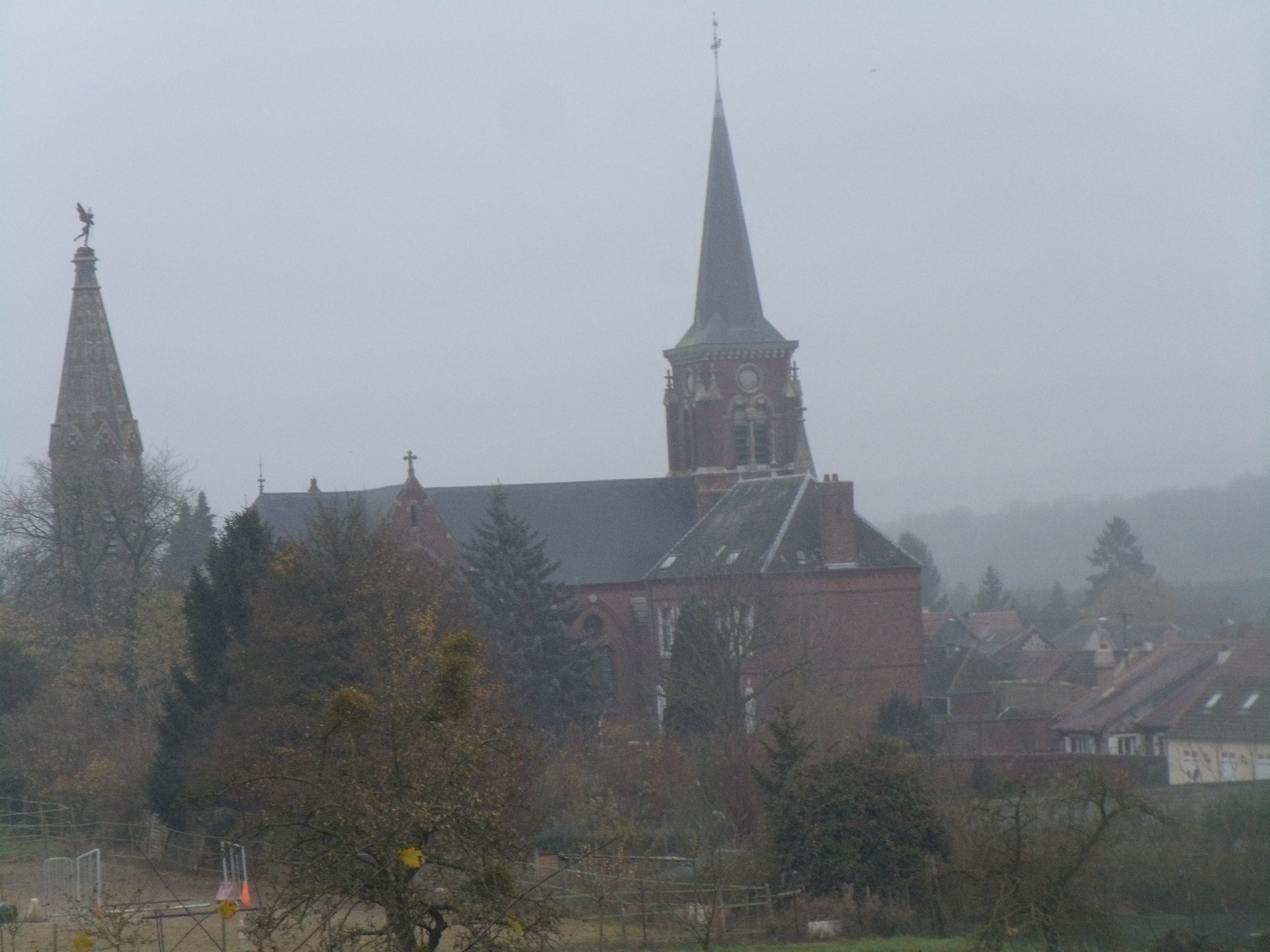
- The church in Saint-Rémy-en-l'Eau
- Location of Saint-Remy-en-l'Eau
- Location within France Location within Hauts-de-France
- Coordinates: 49°28′21″N 2°25′55″E
- Country: France
- Region: Hauts-de-France
- Department: Oise
- Arrondissement: Clermont
- Canton: Saint-Just-en-Chaussée
- Intercommunality: Plateau Picard

Government
  - Mayor (2020–2026): Pascal Theophile
- Area^{1}: 10.06 km^{2} (3.88 sq mi)
- Elevation: 80 m (260 ft)
- Highest elevation: 171 m (561 ft)
- Lowest elevation: 75 m (246 ft)
- Population (2023): 431
  - Density: 42.8/km^{2} (111/sq mi)
- Time zone: UTC+01:00 (CET)
  - Summer (DST): UTC+02:00 (CEST)
- INSEE/Postal code: 60595 /60130
- ^{1} French Land Register data, which excludes lakes, ponds, glaciers > 1 km^{2} (0.386 sq mi or 247 acres) and river estuaries.

Saint-Remy-en-l'Eau (French pronunciation: [sɛ̃ ʁemi ɑ̃ lo]) is a commune in the Oise department in northern France.

== Transport ==
The D101, D158 and D916 roads pass through the commune. Saint-Remy-en-l'Eau has a train station on the outskirts of the village, on the line from Creil to Amiens.

== See also ==
- Communes of the Oise department
