= Tartigny =

- Commune
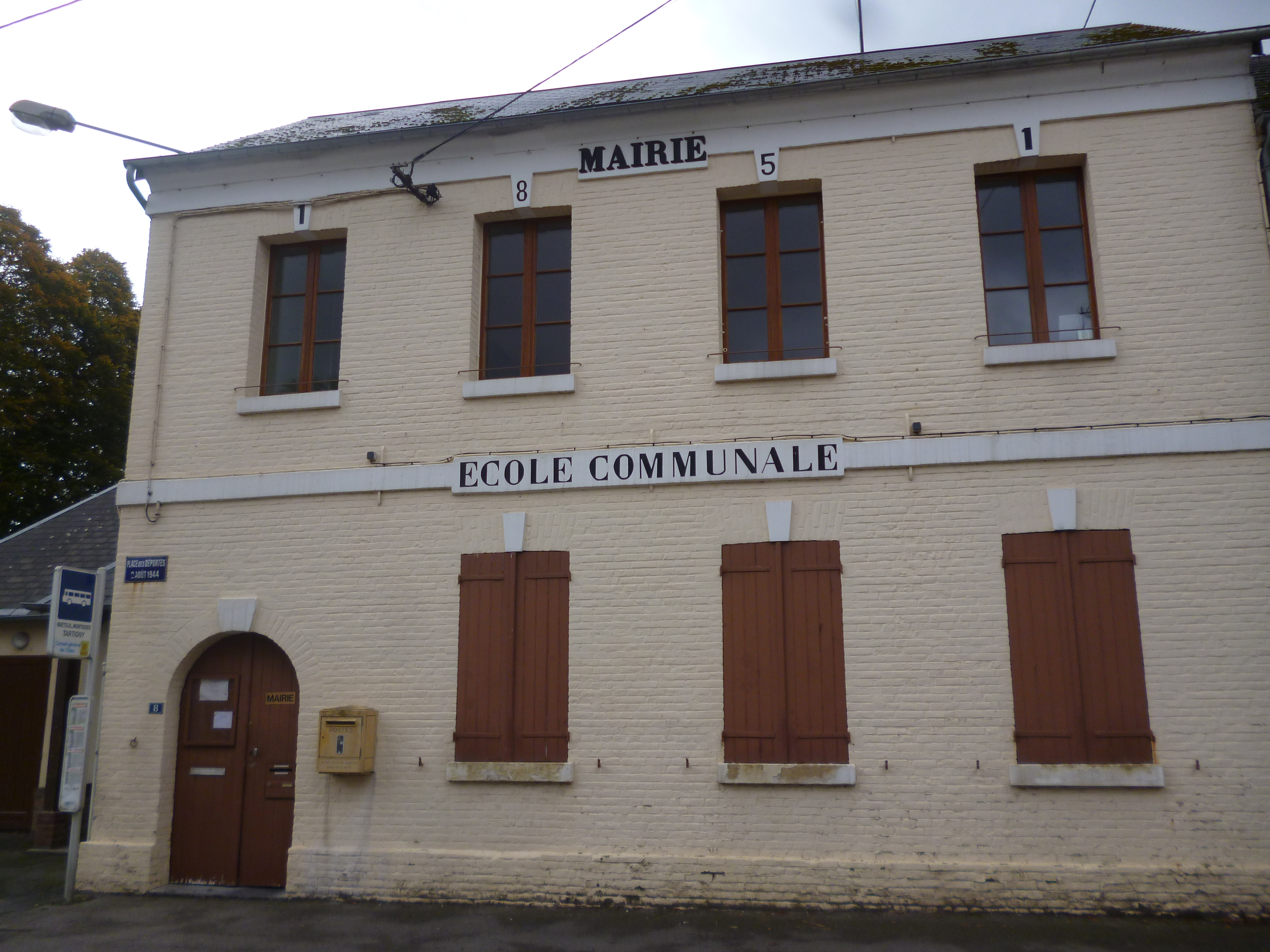
- The town hall in Tartigny

- Coat of arms
- Location of Tartigny
- Location within France Location within Hauts-de-France
- Coordinates: 49°38′05″N 2°21′41″E
- Country: France
- Region: Hauts-de-France
- Department: Oise
- Arrondissement: Clermont
- Canton: Saint-Just-en-Chaussée

Government
  - Mayor (2020–2026): Pierre Masschelein
- Area^{1}: 6.98 km^{2} (2.69 sq mi)
- Elevation: 105 m (344 ft)
- Highest elevation: 149 m (489 ft)
- Lowest elevation: 76 m (249 ft)
- Population (2023): 250
  - Density: 36/km^{2} (93/sq mi)
- Time zone: UTC+01:00 (CET)
  - Summer (DST): UTC+02:00 (CEST)
- INSEE/Postal code: 60627 /60120
- ^{1} French Land Register data, which excludes lakes, ponds, glaciers > 1 km^{2} (0.386 sq mi or 247 acres) and river estuaries.

Tartigny (French pronunciation: [taʁtiɲi]) is a commune in the Oise department in northern France.

== See also ==
- Communes of the Oise department
