= Bulles =

- Commune
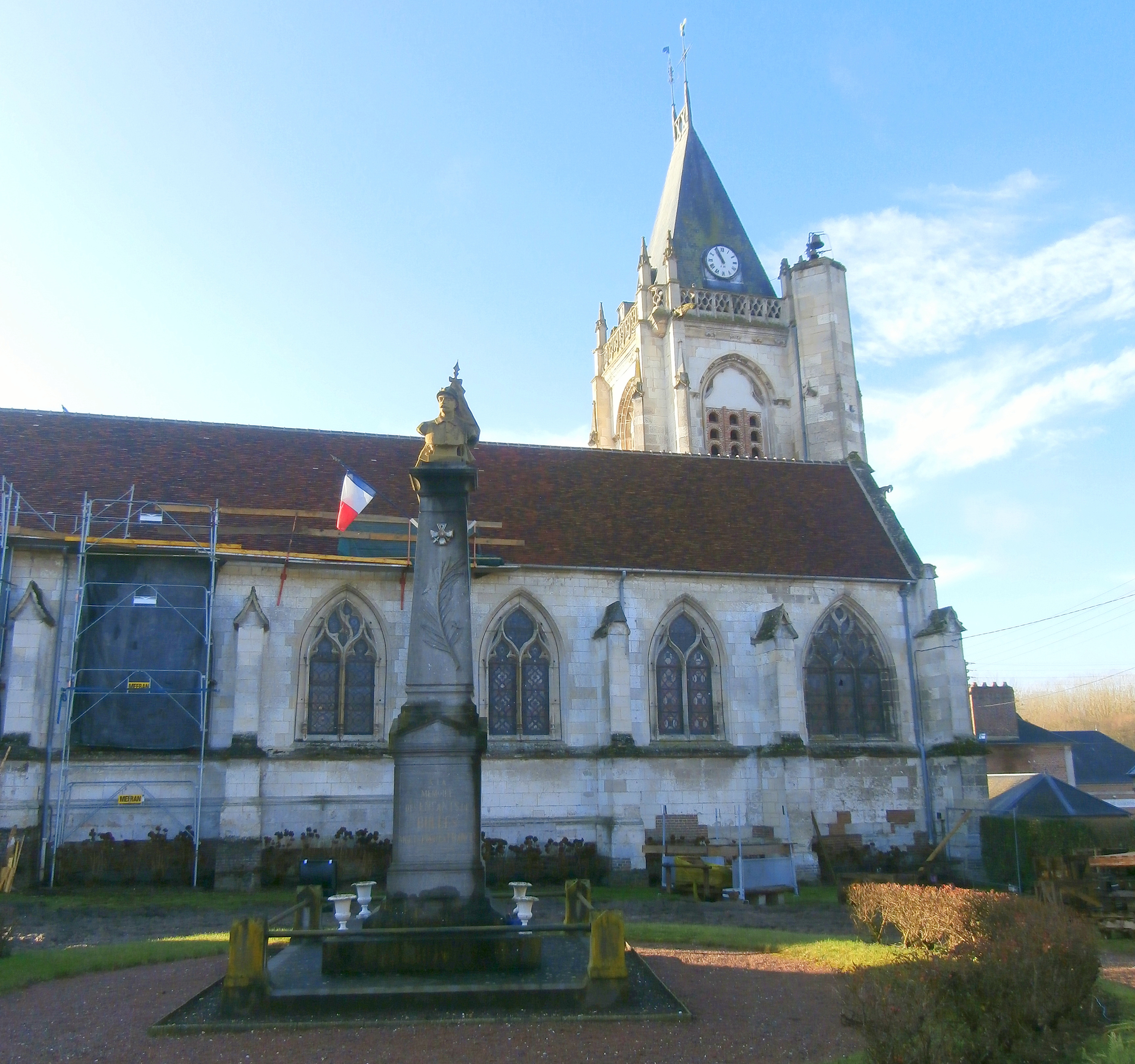
- The church in Bulles

- Coat of arms
- Location of Bulles
- Location within France Location within Hauts-de-France
- Coordinates: 49°27′37″N 2°19′37″E
- Country: France
- Region: Hauts-de-France
- Department: Oise
- Arrondissement: Clermont
- Canton: Saint-Just-en-Chaussée
- Intercommunality: Plateau Picard

Government
  - Mayor (2020–2026): Sylvie Masset
- Area^{1}: 16.7 km^{2} (6.4 sq mi)
- Elevation: 122 m (400 ft)
- Highest elevation: 141 m (463 ft)
- Lowest elevation: 71 m (233 ft)
- Population (2023): 830
  - Density: 50/km^{2} (130/sq mi)
- Time zone: UTC+01:00 (CET)
  - Summer (DST): UTC+02:00 (CEST)
- INSEE/Postal code: 60115 /60130
- ^{1} French Land Register data, which excludes lakes, ponds, glaciers > 1 km^{2} (0.386 sq mi or 247 acres) and river estuaries.

Bulles (French pronunciation: [byl]) is a commune in the Oise department in northern France.

== Population ==
Historical population
Year	Pop.	±% p.a.
1968	696	—
1975	716	+0.41%
1982	691	−0.51%
1990	825	+2.24%
1999	885	+0.78%
2007	891	+0.08%
2012	901	+0.22%
2017	894	−0.16%
2023	830	−1.23%
Source: INSEE

== See also ==
- Communes of the Oise department
