= Armorial of the Communes of Oise (D–H) =

This page lists the armoury (emblazons=graphics and blazons=heraldic descriptions; or coats of arms) of the communes from D-H in Oise (department 60)

Other pages:

- Armorial of the Communes of Oise (A–C)
- Armorial of the Communes of Oise (D–H)
- Armorial of the Communes of Oise (I–P)
- Armorial of the Communes of Oise (Q–Z)

== D ==
Image	Name of Commune	French original blazon	English blazon
	Delincourt	de gueules aux trois marteaux d'or.	Gules, 3 hammers Or.
	Le Déluge	de gueules à un sautoir d'or, cantonné de 4 merlettes du même.	Gules, a saltire between 4 marlets Or.

== E ==
Image	Name of Commune	French original blazon	English blazon
	Élincourt-Sainte-Marguerite	Parti : au premier de gueules aux deux fasces d’argent, celle en pointe chargée de trois étoiles de sable, au second d’azur à l’épée d’argent garnie d’or, surmontée d’une couronne royale du même et accostée de deux fleurs de lys aussi d’or.	Gules, 2 fesses argent, the lower one charged with 3 mullets [of 5] sable. impaled with Azure, a sword argent garnished, between 2 fleurs-de-lys, and in chief a royal crown Or.
	Énencourt-le-Sec	d'or à huit merlettes de sable posées en orle.	Or, 8 martlets in orle sable.
	Épineuse	d'hermine à l'écusson de gueules chargé à dextre d'une étoile d'or.	Ermine, an inescutcheon gules charged to dexter with a mullet Or.
	Eragny-sur-Epte	D’argent au lion de sable armé et lampassé de gueules, accompagné en chef à dextre d’une fleur de lys et à semestre d’une palette de peintre, à la champagne ondée le tout d’azur à la bordure de gueules.	Argent, a lion sable armed and langued gules, between a fleur-de-lys, a painter's palette and a base wavy azure, all within a bordure gules.
	Ermenonville	de gueules à la foi d'argent mouvant des flancs, surmontée d'un écusson d'azur bordé d'or et chargé d'une fleur de lys du même.	Gules, a foi argent issuant from both sides, an in chief on an inescutcheon azure fimbriated a fleur-de-lys Or.
	Erquery	d'argent au lion de gueules.	Argent, a lion gules. (the Counts of Armagnac and the communes of Walincourt, Humerœuille, La Roche-Derrien, Sornac, Espelette, Gigean, Médis and Erquery use the same arms.)
	Estrées-Saint-Denis	d'argent au soc de charrue d'or emmanché de sable, au chef tiercé en pal d'azur, d'argent et de gueules.	Argent, a ploughshare Or hafted sable, a chief tierced per pale azure, argent, and gules.
	Étouy	d’argent à la double tête d'aigle bicéphale de sable accompagnée de trois fleurs de lys au pied nourri d’azur, surmontée d’un lambel aussi de sable, chaque pendant chargé d’une moucheture d’hermine du champ, à la bordure componée d’azur et de gueules de seize pièces.	Argent, the two heads of a double-headed eagle sable between 3 demi-fleurs-de-lys azure, in chief a label sable each pendant charged with an ermine spot argent, all within a bordure compony azure and gules [of 16 pieces].
	Évricourt	d'azur à un arbre au naturel.	Azure, a tree proper.

== F ==
Image	Name of Commune	French original blazon	English blazon
	Fitz-James	Ecartelé : aux I et IV contre-écartelé d'azur à trois fleurs de lys d'or (de France) et de gueules à trois léopards d'or (d'Angleterre); au II d'or, au lion de gueules, au double trescheur fleuronné et contre-fleuronné du même (d'Ecosse); au III d'azur, à la harpe d'or, cordée d'argent (d'Irlande); à la bordure componée de douze pièces d'azur et de gueules, chaque pièce d'azur chargée d'une fleur-de-lys et chaque pièces de gueules chargée d'un léopard d'or.	Quarterly 1&4: Quarterly azure, 3 fleurs-de-lys Or [France] and gules, 3 leopards Or [England]; 2: Or, a lion within a double tressure flory-counter flory gules [Scotland]; 3: Azure, a harp Or stringed argent [Ireland]; all within a bordure compony [of 12 pieces] 'azure, a fleur-de-lys Or' and 'gules, a leopard Or'.
	Flavacourt	D’argent papelonnée de gueules entre semé de trèfles renversés de sinople au chef d’argent chargé de deux quintefeuilles aussi de gueules.	Argent papelony gules, on each scale a trefoil inverted vert, and on a chief argent, 2 cinqfoils gules.
	Fleurines	écartelé; au 1) d'azur à trois fleurs de lis d'or; au 2) et 3) de sinople aux deux pals d'or; au 4) d'azur à 3 coquilles d'or.	Quarterly 1: Azure, 3 fleurs-de-lys Or; 2&3: Vert, 2 pales Or; 4: Azure, 3 escallops Or.
	Fleury	d’argent au chevron d’azur chargé d’un oiseau du champ membré d’or, accompagnée en pointe d'un fer à cheval de gueules et en chef de deux roses de même boutonnées d’or.	Argent, a chevron azure between 2 roses gules seeded Or and a horseshoe gules, a bird of the field, membered Or.
	Formerie	D'azur semé de fleurs de lys d'or, au donjon "Fort Marie" du même, surmontées d'une bannière de gueules chargée des mots "in turribus firma" en lettres aussi d'or brochants sur le semé; à la bordure du même.	Azure semy de lys, the keep "Fort Marie" Or, and in chief a banner gules charged with the words "in turribus firma", all within a border Or.
	Fouilleuse	de gueules papelonné d'argent entre-semé de trèfles renversés du même, au franc-quartier de sable chargé d'une tour d'or coulissée, ajourée et maçonnée du champ.	Gules papelony, each scale charged with a trefoil inverted argent, on a canton sable, a tower Or, open, portcullised, pierced, and masoned sable.
	Francières	d'argent à la bande de sable.	Argent, a bend sable. (Aragon, Aude uses the same arms.)
	Froissy	écartelé :au premier d'azur au chevron accompagné, en chef de deux épis de blé et en pointe, d’une grappe de raisin, le tout d’or, au deuxième de sable à la croix d’argent chargée de cinq coquilles de gueules, au troisième d’argent au château de gueules maçonné de sable, au quatrième d’azur à la croisse abbatiale contournée d’or.	Quarterly 1: Azure, a chevron between 2 stalks of wheat and bunch of grapes Or; 2: Sable, on a cross argent, 5 escallops gules; 3: Argent, a castle gules masoned sable; 4: Azure, an abbatial croizer contourny Or.

== G ==
Image	Name of Commune	French original blazon	English blazon
	Gaudechart	d'argent à neuf merlettes de gueules posées en orle.	Argent, 9 martlets in orle gules.
	Gerberoy	d'azur à trois gerbes de blé d'or.	Azure, 3 garbs Or. (in addition to the following, other places use similar arms, but with the garbs tied different colours Chaumes-en-Brie, Bonnétable, Capelle-Fermont, Estevelles, Saint-Sever-Calvados, Gerberoy and Wasnes-au-Bac use the same arms.)
	Godenvillers	par deux écus accolé : 1 de gueules aux trois bandes cousues de sable et 2 burelé d'argent et d'azur aux trois chevrons de gueules, dont le premier est écimé, brochant sur le tout.	2 shields accolé: 1: Gules, 3 bends sable; and 2: Barry argent and azure, 3 chevrons gules the top one écimé. (écimé is a French heraldic term meaning chopped off at the top)
	Gournay-sur-Aronde	de gueules à la fasce ondée d'argent, accompagnée en chef d'un château d'or maçonné de sable et en pointe d'un huchet d'or.	Gules, a fess wavy argent between a castle Or masoned sable and a hunting-horn Or.
	Gouvieux	De gueules au chef-pal d’or chargé d’une fasce ondée d’azur sur chargée de trois poissons d’argent nageant en fasce, soutenue d’un chêne arraché de sinople.	Gules, on a pale Or, an oak eradicated vert, and on a chief (conjoined to the pale) Or, a fess wavy azure charged with 3 fish naiant argent.
	Grandvilliers	d'or aux trois bandes d'azur, au chef d'argent chargé d'une fleur de lys de gueules accompagnée de deux fer de pique d'azur.	Or, 3 bends azure, and on a chief argent a fleur-de-lys gules between two spear heads azure.
	Guiscard	d'argent à la bande de gueules.	Argent, a bend gules. (Guiscard, Saint-Vital, Strasbourg and Bailleul use the same arms.)

== H ==
Image	Name of Commune	French original blazon	English blazon
	Hémévillers	d'azur semé de besants d'or.	Azure, semy of bezants [Or]. (Montrésor and Hémévillers use the same arms.)
	Hondainville	d’azur au chevron d’or accompagné en chef de deux étoile du même, en pointe d’une levrette courante d’argent colletée de sable cloué d’or.	Azure, a chevron between 2 mullets [of 5] Or and a greyhound bitch courant argent with a collar sable studded Or.
	Houdancourt	écartelé :au premier et au quatrième d’azur à la tour d’argent maçonnée de sable, au deuxième et au troisième d’argent au lévrier rampant de gueules colleté d’azur bordé et bouclé d’or, accompagné de trois tourteaux de gueules en pal à senestre pour 2 et à dextre pour 3	Quarterly 1&4: Azure, a tower argent masoned sable; 2&3: Argent, a greyhound rampant gules with collar azure edged and buckled Or, and in pale 3 torteaux [gules] - in the 2nd quarter to sinister, in the 3rd, to dexter.
	La Houssoye	de gueules au chevron abaissé et arqué d’argent chargé d’une grenade de sable allumée aussi de gueules, accompagné, en chef, de deux branches de houx et trois feuilles de sinople frangées d’or et en pointe, d’un bouton aussi d’argent cerclé aussi de sable, percé de quatre trous du champ, à la bordure engrêlée d’or chargée de huit merlettes de sable. (adopté en 2001)	
