= Breuil =

Breuil may refer to the following:

== People ==
- Beta Breuil (1876–after 1918), American script editor and screenwriter
- Henri Breuil (1877–1961), French archeologist and ethnographer
- Alphonse du Breuil (1811–1885), French botanist
- Christophe Breuil (born 1968), French mathematician

== Places ==
=== France ===
- Breuil, Somme, in the Somme département
- Breuil-Barret, in the Vendée département
- Breuil-Bois-Robert, in the Yvelines département
- Breuil-la-Réorte, in the Charente-Maritime département
- Breuil-le-Sec, in the Oise département
- Breuil-le-Vert, in the Oise département
- Breuil-Magné, in the Charente-Maritime département
- Breuil-sur-Vesle, in the Marne département

=== Italy ===
- Breuil-Cervinia, in the Aosta Valley

== See also ==
- Breuilh, a former commune in the Dordogne department in southwestern France
- Breil (disambiguation)
- Le Breuil (disambiguation)
