= Agnetz =

Agnetz may refer to:

- Lamb (liturgy) (Old Church Slavonic: Агнецъ, agnets), the square portion of bread cut from the prosphora in the Liturgy of Preparation at the Divine Liturgy in the Orthodox Church and in the Eastern Rites of the Catholic Church
- Agnetz, Oise, a commune of France
