= Francières =

Francières may refer to the following places in France:

- Francières, Oise, a commune in the Oise department
- Francières, Somme, a commune in the Somme department
