= Saint-Aubin-sous-Erquery =

- Commune
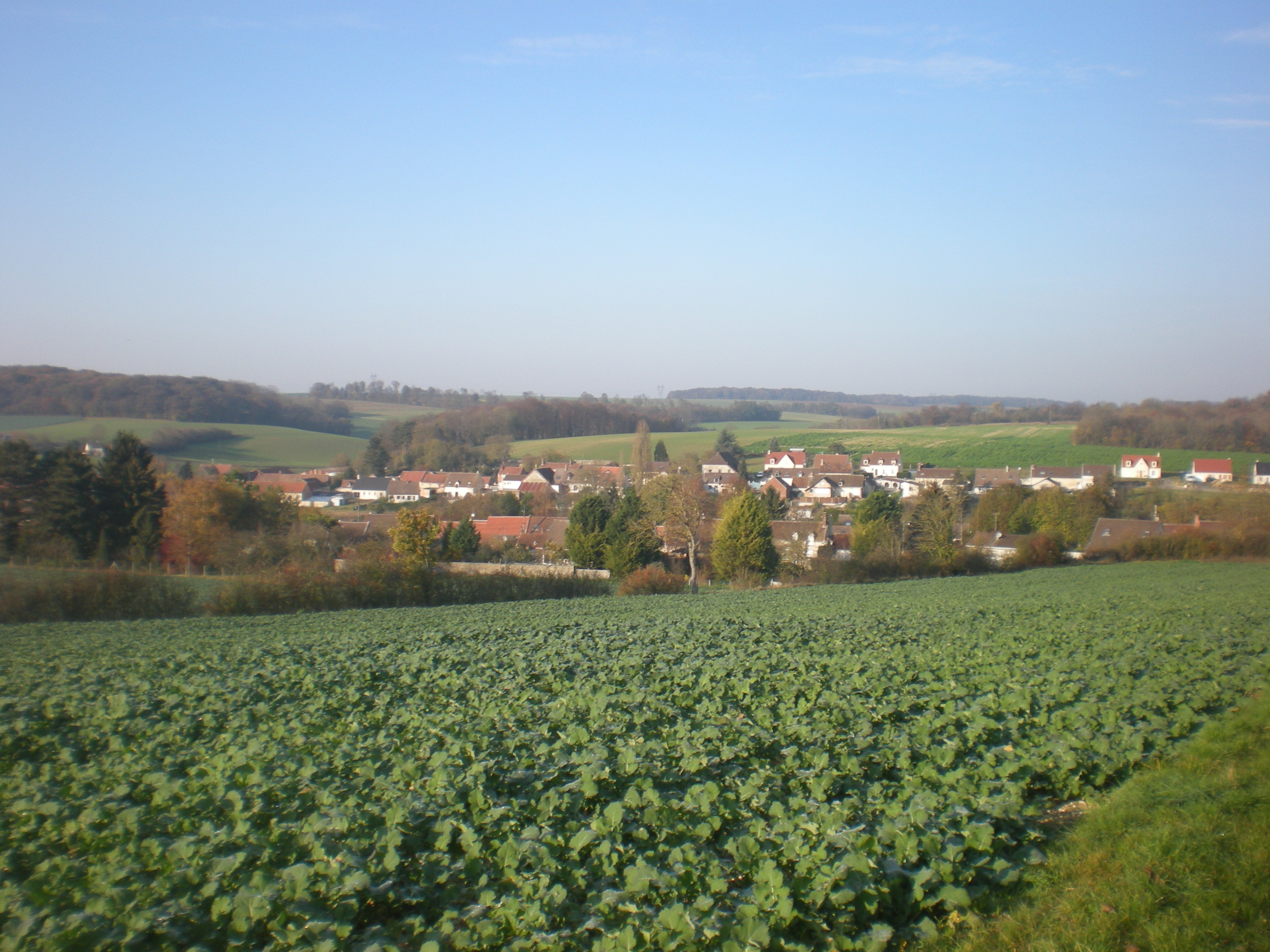
- A general view of Saint-Aubin-sous-Erquery

- Coat of arms
- Location of Saint-Aubin-sous-Erquery
- Location within France Location within Hauts-de-France
- Coordinates: 49°24′29″N 2°29′05″E
- Country: France
- Region: Hauts-de-France
- Department: Oise
- Arrondissement: Clermont
- Canton: Clermont
- Intercommunality: CC du Clermontois

Government
  - Mayor (2020–2026): Brigitte Boulenger
- Area^{1}: 6.26 km^{2} (2.42 sq mi)
- Elevation: 75 m (246 ft)
- Highest elevation: 149 m (489 ft)
- Lowest elevation: 65 m (213 ft)
- Population (2023): 349
  - Density: 55.8/km^{2} (144/sq mi)
- Time zone: UTC+01:00 (CET)
  - Summer (DST): UTC+02:00 (CEST)
- INSEE/Postal code: 60568 /60600
- ^{1} French Land Register data, which excludes lakes, ponds, glaciers > 1 km^{2} (0.386 sq mi or 247 acres) and river estuaries.

Saint-Aubin-sous-Erquery (French pronunciation: [sɛ̃.t‿obɛ̃ su.z‿ɛʁkəʁi], literally Saint-Aubin under Erquery) is a commune in the Oise department in northern France. The commune is part of the Communauté de communes du Clermontois. Population 339 (2021). As of 2022, its mayor is Brigitte Boulenger.

== See also ==
- Communes of the Oise department
