= Căpățână =

Căpățână or Căpățînă is a Romanian surname. Notable people with the surname include:

- Chesarie Căpățână (1784–1846), Wallachian bishop
- Eugen Căpățână (born 1986), Romanian rugby union footballer
- Ion Ionescu-Căpățână (1914–c. 1942), Romanian activist and writer
- Mihai Căpățînă (born 1995), Romanian footballer
