= Breil =

Breil may refer to:

== Places ==
- Breil/Brigels, in Grisons, Switzerland
- Breil, Maine-et-Loire, in the Maine-et-Loire department, France
- Breil-sur-Roya, in the Alpes-Maritimes department, France

== Other ==
- Breil (company), watches, jewelry and fragrance brands of the Binda Group
- Joseph Carl Breil (1870–1926), American composer, especially for silent films

== See also ==
- Breuil (disambiguation)
- Le Breil (disambiguation)
