= Rosoy =

Rosoy may refer to:

- Rosoy, Oise
- Rosoy, Yonne
