= Auguste Bouché-Leclercq =

French historian

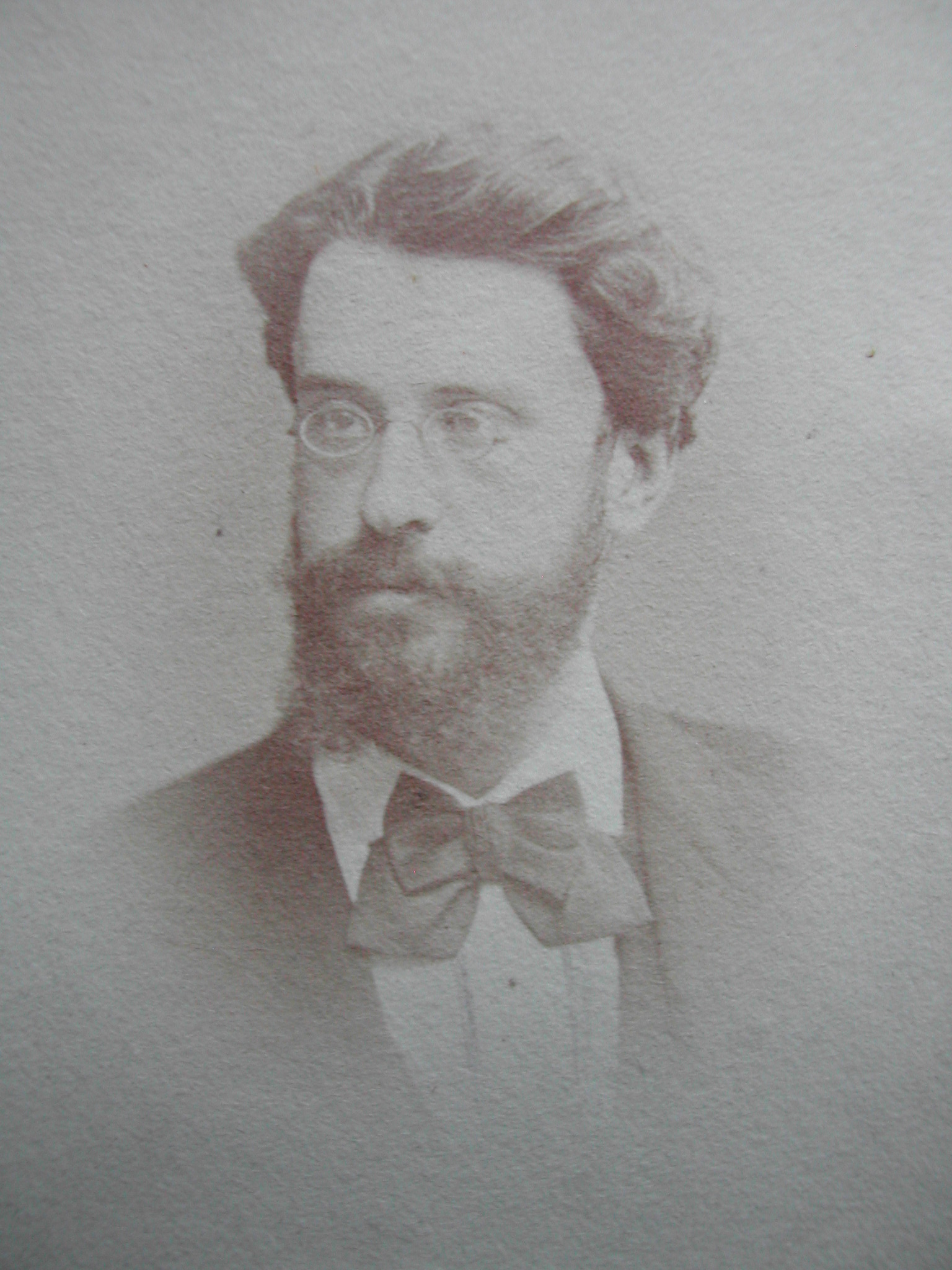
Auguste Bouché-Leclercq

Auguste Bouché-Leclercq (30 July 1842 – 19 July 1923) was a French historian.

== Life ==
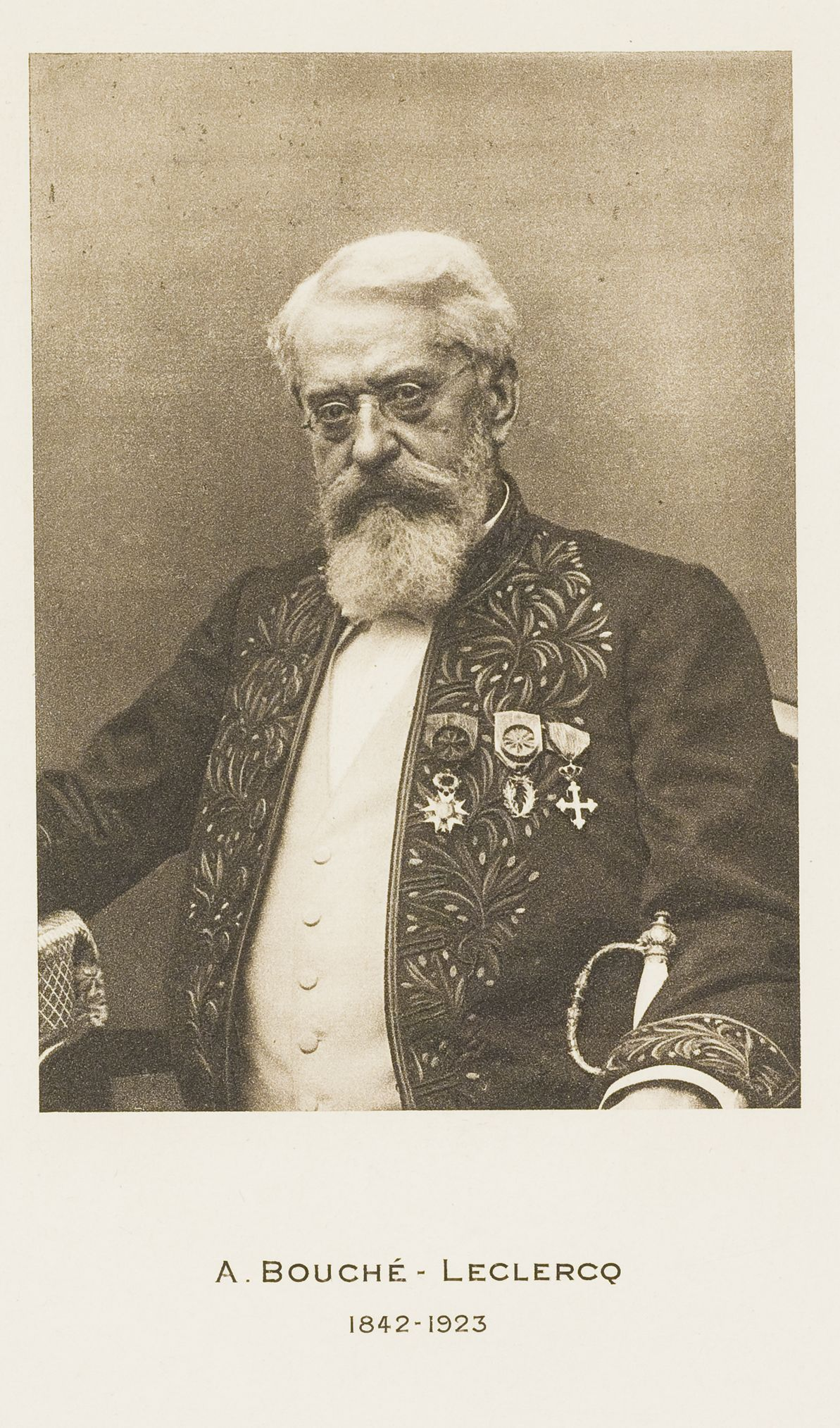
Auguste Bouché-Leclercq

Auguste Bouché-Leclercq was born in 1842 at Francières, Oise as son of Louis-Thomas Bouché and Marie-Joséphine Leclercq. His parents were farmers. He was educated at seminaries and took his school-leaving exam in 1861 in Paris. Later he travelled as private tutor several months through Italian and German cities. In 1866 he was grammar school teacher at Meaux. In 1872 he received his doctorate in philosophy and was from 1873-1878 professor of ancient literature at the philosophical faculty of Montpellier. In 1876 he married Marie Julie Guillaume and had with her three sons and one daughter. He became professor of ancient history in Paris in 1887, member of the Académie des Inscriptions et Belles-Lettres in 1898 and officer of the Legion of Honour in 1903. He retired in 1918 and died in 1923 at Nogent-sur-Marne.

Bouché-Leclercq’s research centred on the ancient history of religion and the history of Hellenism. He wrote important works about the Ptolemaic dynasty and the Seleucid Empire and translated the works of German historians into French, for example, 1883-1885 the Geschichte des Hellenismus by Johann Gustav Droysen.

== Works (incomplete) ==
L’Astrologie grecque (1899)

- 1871 Les pontifes de l’ancienne Rome (thesis)
- 1879 Histoire de la divination dans l'antiquité
- 1883 Histoire grecque
- 1886 Manuel des institutions romaines
- 1888 Histoire de la Grèce sous la domination des romains
- 1899 L’astrologie grecque
- 1900 Leçons d’histoire grecque
- 1903 Histoire des Lagides
- 1913 Histoire des Séleucides (323-64 avant J.-C.)
