= Catenoy =

- Commune
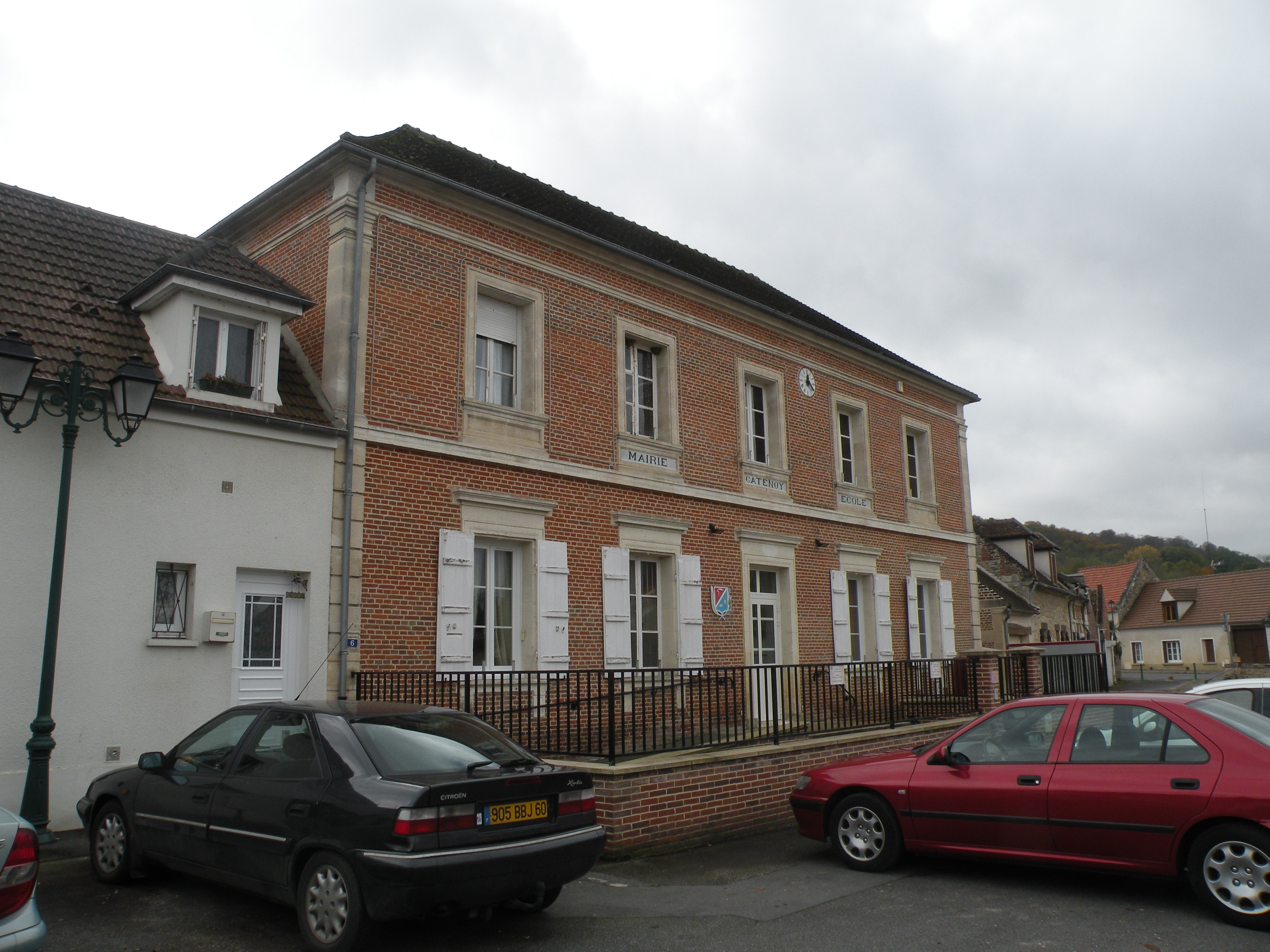
- The town hall in Catenoy
- Location of Catenoy
- Location within France Location within Hauts-de-France
- Coordinates: 49°22′09″N 2°30′41″E
- Country: France
- Region: Hauts-de-France
- Department: Oise
- Arrondissement: Clermont
- Canton: Clermont

Government
  - Mayor (2020–2026): Michel Rubé
- Area^{1}: 12.61 km^{2} (4.87 sq mi)
- Elevation: 71 m (233 ft)
- Highest elevation: 163 m (535 ft)
- Lowest elevation: 53 m (174 ft)
- Population (2023): 1,125
  - Density: 89.21/km^{2} (231.1/sq mi)
- Time zone: UTC+01:00 (CET)
  - Summer (DST): UTC+02:00 (CEST)
- INSEE/Postal code: 60130 /60840
- ^{1} French Land Register data, which excludes lakes, ponds, glaciers > 1 km^{2} (0.386 sq mi or 247 acres) and river estuaries.

Catenoy (French pronunciation: [katnwa]) is a commune in the Oise department in northern France.

== See also ==
- Communes of the Oise department
