= Domfront, Oise =

Domfront
- Commune
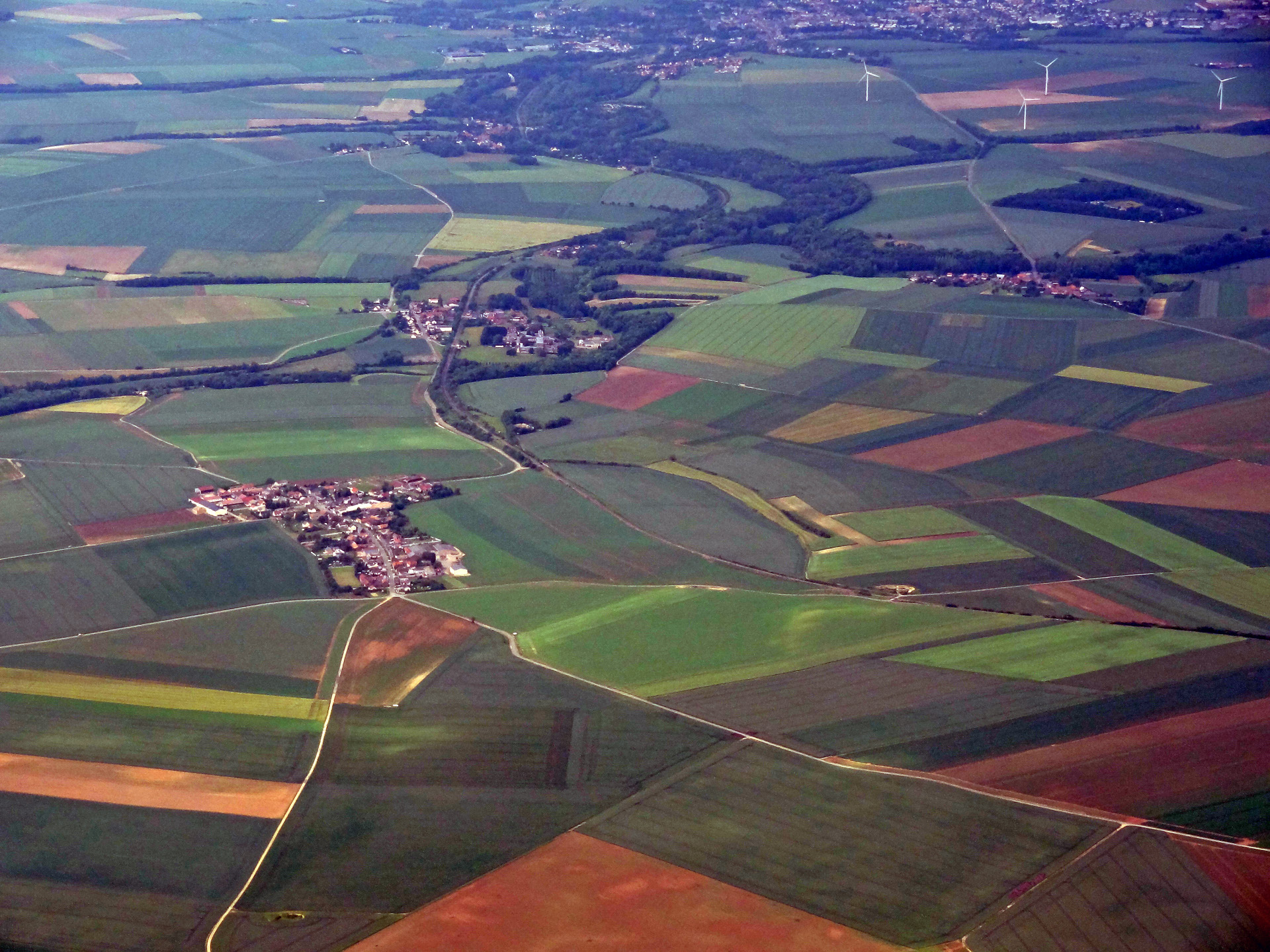
- An aerial view of Godenvillers and Domfront
- Location of Domfront
- Location within France Location within Hauts-de-France
- Coordinates: 49°36′14″N 2°33′22″E
- Country: France
- Region: Hauts-de-France
- Department: Oise
- Arrondissement: Clermont
- Canton: Estrées-Saint-Denis
- Intercommunality: Plateau Picard

Government
  - Mayor (2020–2026): Christophe Carré
- Area^{1}: 2.76 km^{2} (1.07 sq mi)
- Elevation: 77 m (253 ft)
- Highest elevation: 95 m (312 ft)
- Lowest elevation: 67 m (220 ft)
- Population (2023): 310
  - Density: 110/km^{2} (290/sq mi)
- Time zone: UTC+01:00 (CET)
  - Summer (DST): UTC+02:00 (CEST)
- INSEE/Postal code: 60200 /60420
- ^{1} French Land Register data, which excludes lakes, ponds, glaciers > 1 km^{2} (0.386 sq mi or 247 acres) and river estuaries.

Domfront (French pronunciation: [dɔ̃fʁɔ̃]) is a commune in the Oise department in northern France.

== See also ==
- Communes of the Oise department
