= Canton of Clermont =

Canton of France

Coordinates: 49.38°N 2.41°E

- Canton
- Situation of the canton of Clermont in the department of Oise
- Country: France
- Region: Hauts-de-France
- Department: Oise
- No. of communes: {{{nbcomm}}}
- Population (2023): 39,245
- INSEE code: 6005

The canton of Clermont is an administrative division of the Oise department, northern France. Its borders were modified at the French canton reorganisation which came into effect in March 2015. Its seat is in Clermont.

It consists of the following communes:

1. Agnetz
2. Bailleval
3. Breuil-le-Sec
4. Breuil-le-Vert
5. Catenoy
6. Clermont
7. Erquery
8. Étouy
9. Fitz-James
10. Fouilleuse
11. Labruyère
12. Lamécourt
13. Liancourt
14. Maimbeville
15. Nointel
16. Rantigny
17. Rémécourt
18. Rosoy
19. Saint-Aubin-sous-Erquery
20. Verderonne
