= Maimbeville =

- Commune
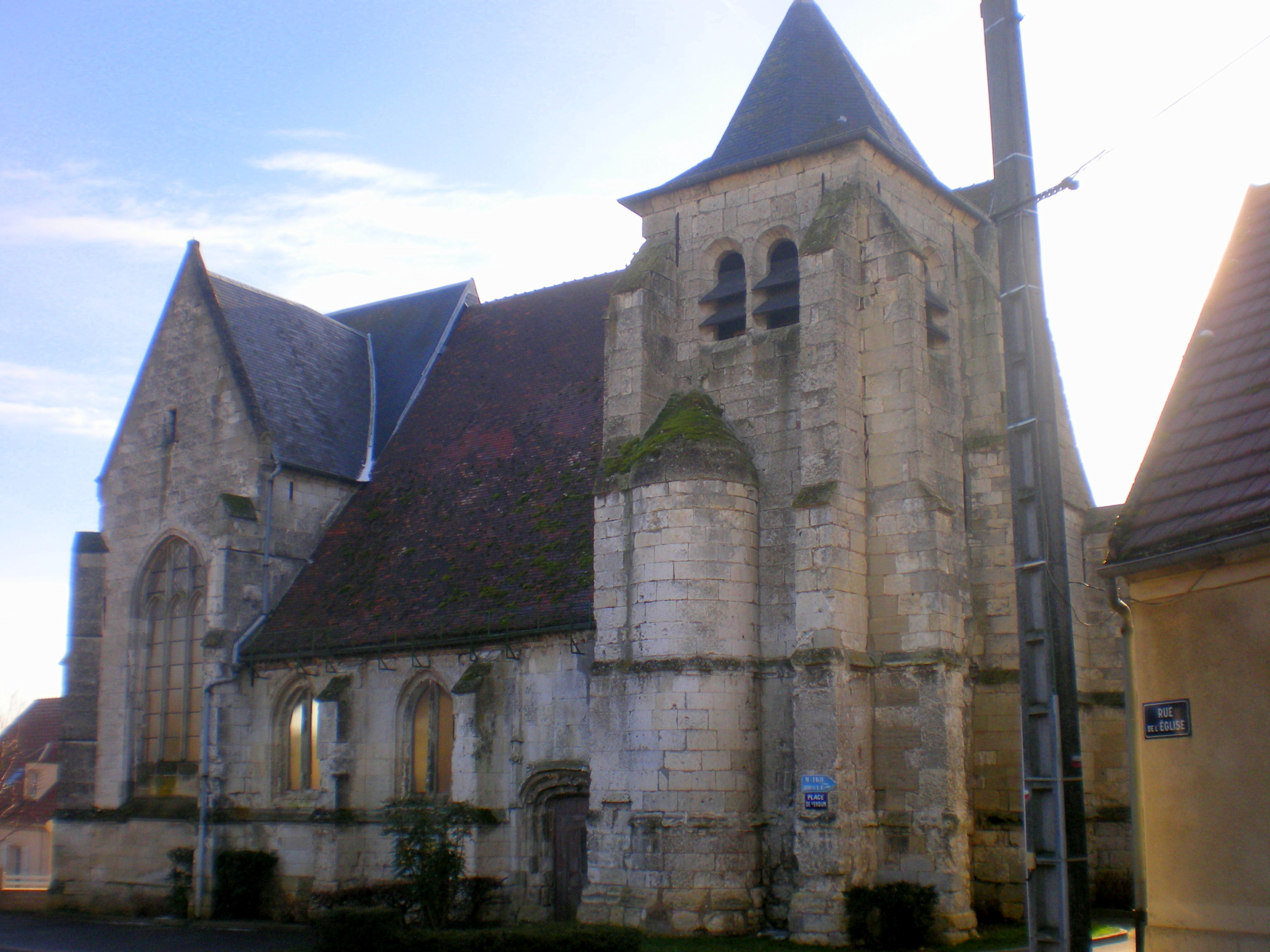
- The church in Maimbeville

- Coat of arms
- Location of Maimbeville
- Location within France Location within Hauts-de-France
- Coordinates: 49°24′58″N 2°31′18″E
- Country: France
- Region: Hauts-de-France
- Department: Oise
- Arrondissement: Clermont
- Canton: Clermont

Government
  - Mayor (2022–2026): Guillaume Vannier
- Area^{1}: 5.75 km^{2} (2.22 sq mi)
- Elevation: 182 m (597 ft)
- Highest elevation: 156 m (512 ft)
- Lowest elevation: 73 m (240 ft)
- Population (2023): 381
  - Density: 66.3/km^{2} (172/sq mi)
- Time zone: UTC+01:00 (CET)
  - Summer (DST): UTC+02:00 (CEST)
- INSEE/Postal code: 60375 /60600
- ^{1} French Land Register data, which excludes lakes, ponds, glaciers > 1 km^{2} (0.386 sq mi or 247 acres) and river estuaries.

Maimbeville (French pronunciation: [mɛ̃bvil]) is a commune in the Oise department in northern France.

== See also ==
- Communes of the Oise department
