= Ion Ionescu-Căpățână =

Romanian writer and activist (1914–1942/3)

Ion Ionescu-Căpățână, often shortened to Ion Căpățână or Căpățînă (1914 – 1942 or 1943), was a Romanian writer, publisher, and political activist. A promoter of vegetarianism, he also discovered libertarianism and individual anarchism, which he fused with influences from Gandhism; in the early 1930s, his magazine Vegetarianismul functioned as a discreet protagonist on the Romanian anarchist scene. Căpățână, who was an Esperantist and environmentalist, also aligned himself with Panait Istrati—a figure on the anti-Stalinist left who had maintained cordial relations with a dissident fascist movement, the Crusade of Romanianism. He defended Istrati's reading of communism in his trips to France and Bulgaria, and, after Istrati's death, established his own channels of communications with the Crusade. Căpățână eventually left the Kingdom of Romania, spending time in Paris as an advocate of the Republicans in the Spanish Civil War. He still published some of his works at home, and edited a Romanian translation of poems by Hristo Botev.

Căpățână spent his final years entirely in France, where he translated and self-published Istrati's final articles, albeit in a highly adapted (and therefore controversial) form. He married a Frenchwoman and moved with her in a cabin outside Rantigny, feeding himself off the land. He witnessed the German occupation, and in his late work expressed a newfound sympathy toward Nazism—though he continued to be seen as an anarchist icon by various of his contemporaries. He died aged 28 or 29, after consuming mushrooms that were either uncooked or poisonous. In the 1960s, an effort was made to republish his Istratian volumes.

== Biography ==
=== Romanian career ===
Journalist Tibor Molnár, who met Ionescu-Căpățână in October 1936, when the latter was aged 22, describes him as a having "blond hair [and] a sparse mustache", being soft-spoken and overall "not typical" in his demeanor and appearance. A fellow anarchist, Eugen Relgis, once spoke of him as "self-taught". His first and most lasting commitment was to vegetarianism, which he took up from the age of twelve—after having read Jean-Jacques Rousseau's Emile; he credited this lifestyle choices, also including temperance advocacy, with having remade him into a calm human, easing his transition toward nonviolence. In the early 1930s, the young man was won over by Istrati's philosophy, which advocated ideological pluralism (synthesizing various strains of libertarianism), and took additional inspiration from anarchists such as Gérard de Lacaze-Duthiers. He was additionally impressed by Mahatma Gandhi, whom he once described to Molnár as the world's greatest contemporary figure.

In 1932, Căpățână was putting out the magazine Vegetarianismul, obtaining contributions from Istrati and Relgis, as well as from Victor Iamandi, Ivan Gorbunov-Posadov, and Yordan Kovachev. Historian Vlad Brătuleanu comments that, as the mainstays of this publication, Căpățână and Relgis only made oblique references to politics, but also that their implicit theory on "purified" society had "astonishing similarities" with individualist anarchism of the Max Stirner kind, particularly in its derivative French variety; Căpățână published the translation of at least one article by Han Ryner, glorifying primitivism. Vegetarianismul's second issue for 1934 featured Relgis' musings, linking humanitarianism and eugenics. By October, Căpățână was a general secretary of the International Vegetarian Union, and had co-founded the Romanian Vegetarian Society, placed under the honorary chairmanship of physician Constantin Ion Parhon (and with sociologist Henric Sanielevici as its active president). Literary historian Mircea Iorgulescu sees him as a "bizarre figure" in Romanian life, noting that he combined in his person anarchism, Esperantism, and environmentalism; Relgis adds his friend's status as an eclectic anarchist, promoting "pacifism and various libertarian tendencies".

Self-published by Căpățână, Vegetarianismul ultimately disappeared after evidence that its movement was entirely marginal: its attempt to form an agricultural commune (based on models advanced by Élisée Reclus, Peter Kropotkin, and possibly also Pierre-Joseph Proudhon) met with general indifference. By Căpățână's own admission, 1934 was also when he first traveled to France—specifically because he wished to meet the self-exiled Istrati, and to ask him for existential advice. He recalls that the senior writer, already terminally ill, was bitter and disappointed about his former friends in the French Communist Party, whom he had lost for stating his ideas on the Soviet Union and Stalinism. He continued to be drawn to France, "the land of reason", even after Istrati himself decided to move back to Romania, where he embarked on a collaboration with the controversial Crusade of Romanianism (which had broken out of the fascist Iron Guard). Căpățână hoped to find a surviving network of Istratian disciples, but eventually acknowledged that none could be found in all of France at that time—he was instead surprised to discover that many regular people believed the communists' narrative on Istrati as a traitor of the working class.

Ionescu-Căpățână returned to his homeland, and reached Brașov, just as the local papers were carrying news of Istrati's death. He immediately left for Bucharest, where he attended his mentor's funeral, afterwards seeking to meet with Crusaders such as Mihai Stelescu and Alexandru Talex, whom he intended to interview about their collaboration with Istrati. He never managed to, but instead began reading through articles that Istrati had penned for the Crusade's journal, and was persuaded that, far from betraying the workers' cause, Istrati had always stood by the "generous principles" of the anti-Stalinist left. Comparatist Heinrich Stiehler summarizes his interpretation: "[the Crusade] oriented itself, especially as a national movement, against communism, in the historical form of Stalinism, with its lack of alternatives."

Căpățână sought to popularize his discovery in Romania and in neighboring Bulgaria (a country he deeply admired for its vegetarian traditions), but found out that the Soviet interpretation had prevailed in both countries—and that "not a single working-class or avant-garde publication would agree to publish articles defending Panait Istrati." He only found an audience among the libertarians and the Tolstoyans, who at the very least agreed to review the evidence he had gathered up in Istrati's favor. He also attended Crusade meetings, where he heard Stelescu speak about the looming danger posed by the Iron Guard—shortly before a Guardist death squad murdered Stelescu himself.

=== In exile ===
Brătuleanu notes that Căpățână had already emigrated from Romania in 1935, and that he soon after became involved in supporting the Republican side in the Spanish Civil War. Molnár reports that, in 1936, he had relocated to Bucharest, and was traveling to places such as Arad, still lecturing the general public on the benefits of vegetarianism. He attempted to revive Vegetarianismul, but government censors banned the magazine as engaged in propaganda for a "political ideology" (Căpățână described this as a misunderstanding, "still trust[ing] that the matter will be clarified"). By his own account, Căpățână settled in France in 1937, just as the Crusade was moving back to the right (or, as Căpățână himself argued, was being annexed and repurposed by the Iron Guard). As noted by scholar Édouard Raydon, he was fleeing the dangers posed by "events in Central Europe", he had also been angered by the political censorship imposed in Romania. From Paris, he coordinated a press service in support of the Spanish Republicans. The activist had "no real understanding of French", but learned it almost immediately, building on his prior knowledge of Esperanto. He could therefore begin work on translating and publishing Istrati's final articles (all of which had been written in Romanian). In doing so, he helped respond to claims that Istrati had died as a fascist. His last published works in Romania included a translation of Les Délégués d’atelier, by the syndicalist ideologue Maurice Chambelland (appearing at Umanitatea publishers in 1937, it was prefaced by I. Felea). Also then, Căpățână curated the first-ever Romanian edition of poems by a 19th-century Bulgarian revolutionist, Hristo Botev.

Ionescu-Căpățână married a Frenchwoman, about whom little is known, other than that she was born somewhere in the banlieue of Paris and that she worked as an archival clerk for the postal service (her salary was his only regular source of income). Raydon identifies her as Ana Munsch, and notes that she was Ion's second wife. In 1938, the couple settled in a two-room cabin at Soutraine, a forested area outside Rantigny, where Ionescu-Căpățână also relocated his printing press. Keeping up with his strict vegetarianism, he fed himself on plants from his own garden, raised bees, and built himself a masonry oven where he baked his own bread. Căpățână embarked on a collaboration with Lacaze-Duthiers, together with whom he published a short-lived philosophical review, Aristocratie (or Cahiers de l'Aristocratie), which appeared for just one series (1939–1940). It was entirely printed by Căpățână himself, who also handled its Esperanto pages. Other portions were done in French (by Lacaze), Romanian (Relgis) and Spanish (Benjamín Cano Ruiz).

Căpățână stayed in place during the fall of France and the subsequent German occupation, and in 1941 was still busy publishing Istrati's articles—in editions that ran at some 200 copies each, and which were advertised by Philéas Lebesgue in Georges Pioch's L'Oeuvre. The Romanian exile befriended a man named Gaston Michaud, who became his correspondent and once visited him in his isolated lodging. He had been impressed by Căpățână as a "courageous idealist" and "lovely young lad", whose very work openly defied the occupation authorities. In one of their letters, he addressed the issue of Vichy collaborators: "We are experiencing an era of collective cowardice, and had I not been living with my wife out in the woods, I believe I should be too disgusted by the goings-on to even conserve my wish to live." However, Căpățână himself is rated by Stiehler as one of the Istrati disciples who had turned into a Nazi sympathizer. His final Istrati volume, which appeared in 1941 as Ma Croisade ou notre croisade ("My Crusade or Our Crusade"), carried a preface which praised the youth of Germany and Imperial Japan, alongside that in the Balkans, for having embarked on constructing a "new order". As Iorgulescu reports, the volume borrowed its title from Talex, and moreover had sweeping interventions made by Căpățână in Istrati's texts, without indicating these to the reader. The editor had removed negative references to "Hitlerism", replacing that word with the vaguer "autocracy".

Relgis suggests that Căpățână always remained a committed anarchist, who still hosted "quite lively" meetings of libertarian activists, and intended to set up an international center for networking between factions. His demise was perceived as a "painful loss for our cause". According to conflicting sources, the young author died in 1942 (during April, according to Relgis) or in summer 1943. He had unwittingly killed himself, "seemingly with a mushroom that he had eaten raw", or, in Michaud's version, a whole platter of uncooked morels. Relgis believes that he had accidentally picked and consumed toxic mushrooms, and that his voluntary isolation prevented doctors from even reaching him.

== Legacy ==
Căpățână was survived by his wife, who had joined him in this feast but had managed to make herself vomit. She was by then pregnant with his daughter—Michaud tried to locate both of them after the war, but was never able to. Raydon was however in contact with Musch, and reported that, by 1968, she was living outside Masseret, having since gone blind. The anarchist Guy Malouvier visited Soutraine around the same time, and saw the cabin in ruins—its standing walls covered in Spanish Republican posters, and still showing traces of Căpățână's modest book-collection. Controversy had by then seeped into Căpățână's legacy: as early as 1945, writer Vasile Christu published in Narod newspaper two Botev manuscripts that, he claimed, had been discovered by him in Căpățână's personal archive. These were a poem and a letter, whose historical importance was in documenting Botev's conversion to communism.

Some of Căpățână's short texts were recovered by Istrati's second-generation followers and hosted by Cahiers Panaït Istrati from 1969. In 1978 the same journal reported that his 1940s monographs were "of course, irretrievable" outside of the Bibliothèque Nationale, but photocopies had been made by Guy Lemonier. Michaud speculated that they were no longer copyrighted, since the last person who could state a claim to their intellectual ownership was Lacaze-Duthiers, himself deceased "sometime after 1945". The texts were eventually republished and, as Iorgulescu informs, accounted for the highly distorted perspective that Westerners maintained for another decade when it came to Istrati and his Crusader's activity.
