= Rémécourt =

- Commune
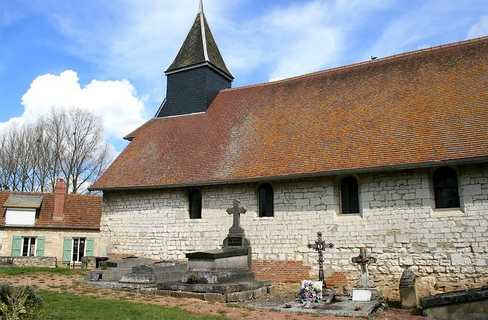
- The church in Rémécourt
- Location of Rémécourt
- Location within France Location within Hauts-de-France
- Coordinates: 49°25′46″N 2°29′42″E
- Country: France
- Region: Hauts-de-France
- Department: Oise
- Arrondissement: Clermont
- Canton: Clermont
- Intercommunality: Clermontois

Government
  - Mayor (2020–2026): Philippe Hesse
- Area^{1}: 2.78 km^{2} (1.07 sq mi)
- Elevation: 125 m (410 ft)
- Highest elevation: 149 m (489 ft)
- Lowest elevation: 83 m (272 ft)
- Population (2023): 78
  - Density: 28/km^{2} (73/sq mi)
- Time zone: UTC+01:00 (CET)
  - Summer (DST): UTC+02:00 (CEST)
- INSEE/Postal code: 60529 /60600
- ^{1} French Land Register data, which excludes lakes, ponds, glaciers > 1 km^{2} (0.386 sq mi or 247 acres) and river estuaries.

Rémécourt (French pronunciation: [ʁemekuʁ]) is a commune in the Oise department in northern France.

== See also ==
- Communes of the Oise department
