= Lamécourt =

- Commune
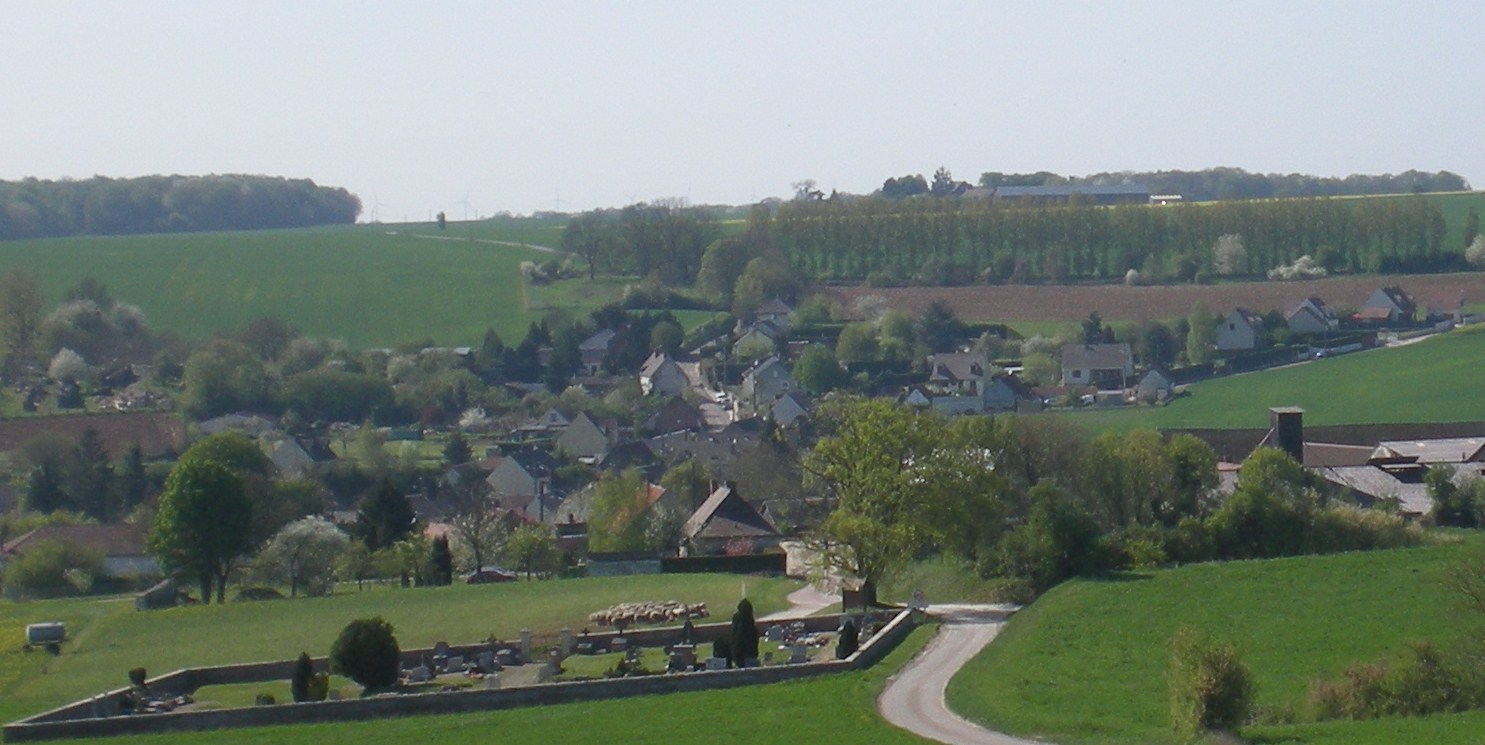
- A general view of Lamécourt

- Coat of arms
- Location of Lamécourt
- Location within France Location within Hauts-de-France
- Coordinates: 49°25′54″N 2°27′58″E
- Country: France
- Region: Hauts-de-France
- Department: Oise
- Arrondissement: Clermont
- Canton: Clermont
- Intercommunality: Clermontois

Government
  - Mayor (2020–2026): Yves Coffineau
- Area^{1}: 3.44 km^{2} (1.33 sq mi)
- Elevation: 100 m (330 ft)
- Highest elevation: 150 m (490 ft)
- Lowest elevation: 77 m (253 ft)
- Population (2023): 196
  - Density: 57.0/km^{2} (148/sq mi)
- Time zone: UTC+01:00 (CET)
  - Summer (DST): UTC+02:00 (CEST)
- INSEE/Postal code: 60345 /60600
- ^{1} French Land Register data, which excludes lakes, ponds, glaciers > 1 km^{2} (0.386 sq mi or 247 acres) and river estuaries.

Lamécourt (French pronunciation: [lamekuʁ]) is a Communes of France in the Oise department in northern France.

== See also ==
- Communes of the Oise department
