= La Corne-en-Vexin =

- Commune
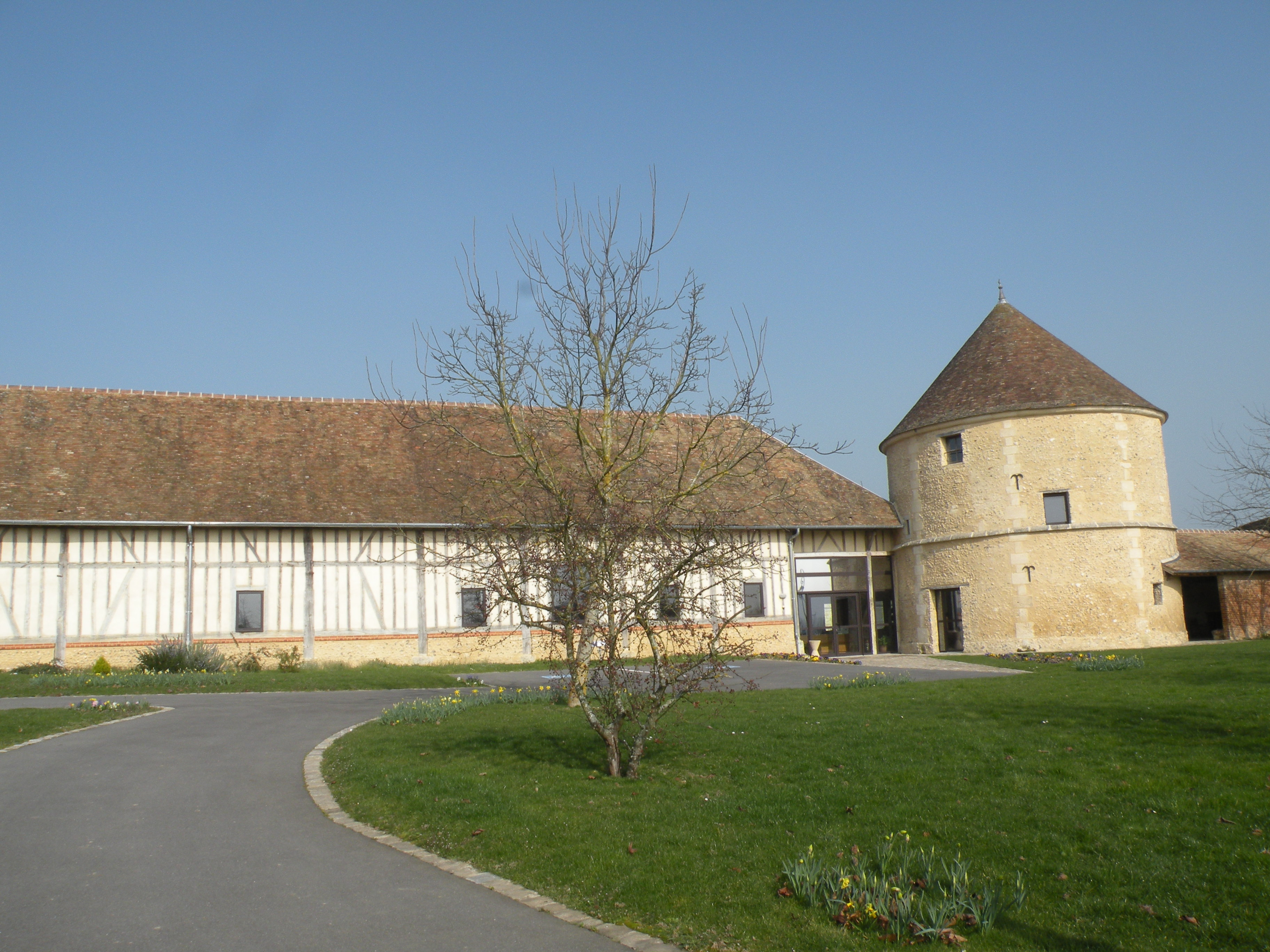
- The town hall in Énencourt-le-Sec
- Location of La Corne-en-Vexin
- Location within France Location within Hauts-de-France
- Coordinates: 49°17′55″N 1°55′23″E
- Country: France
- Region: Hauts-de-France
- Department: Oise
- Arrondissement: Beauvais
- Canton: Chaumont-en-Vexin
- Intercommunality: Vexin-Thelle
- Area^{1}: 16.85 km^{2} (6.51 sq mi)
- Highest elevation: 164 m (538 ft)
- Lowest elevation: 83 m (272 ft)
- Population (2023): 544
  - Density: 32.3/km^{2} (83.6/sq mi)
- Time zone: UTC+01:00 (CET)
  - Summer (DST): UTC+02:00 (CEST)
- INSEE/Postal code: 60209 /60240
- ^{1} French Land Register data, which excludes lakes, ponds, glaciers > 1 km^{2} (0.386 sq mi or 247 acres) and river estuaries.

La Corne-en-Vexin is a commune in the Oise department in northern France. It was established on 1 January 2019 by merger of the former communes of Énencourt-le-Sec (the seat), Boissy-le-Bois and Hardivillers-en-Vexin.

== See also ==
- Communes of the Oise department
