= Bailleval =

- Commune
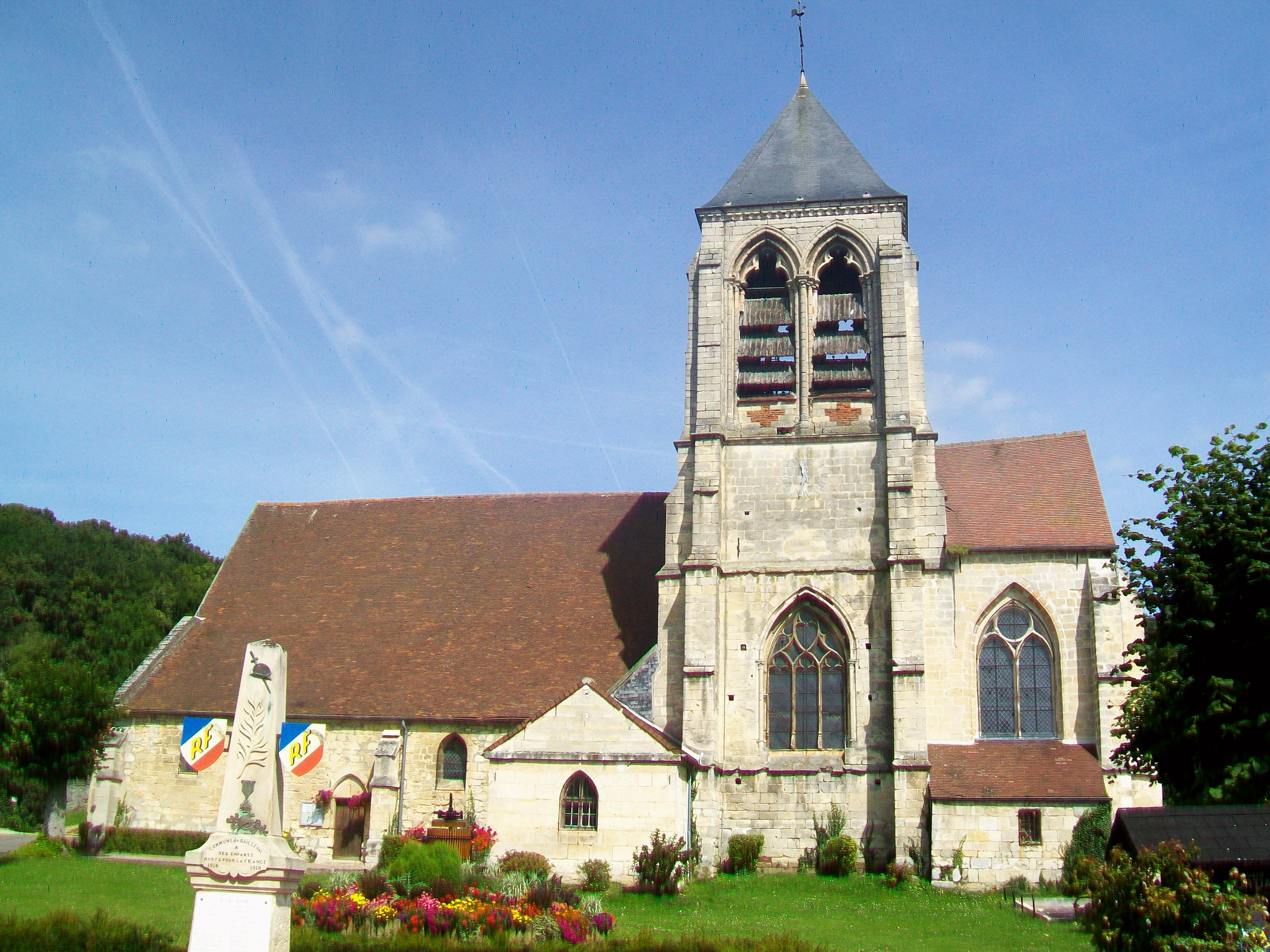
- The church in Bailleval

- Coat of arms
- Location of Bailleval
- Location within France Location within Hauts-de-France
- Coordinates: 49°20′54″N 2°27′29″E
- Country: France
- Region: Hauts-de-France
- Department: Oise
- Arrondissement: Clermont
- Canton: Clermont
- Intercommunality: Liancourtois

Government
  - Mayor (2020–2026): Olivier Ferreira
- Area^{1}: 8.01 km^{2} (3.09 sq mi)
- Elevation: 65 m (213 ft)
- Highest elevation: 161 m (528 ft)
- Lowest elevation: 42 m (138 ft)
- Population (2023): 1,483
  - Density: 185/km^{2} (480/sq mi)
- Time zone: UTC+01:00 (CET)
  - Summer (DST): UTC+02:00 (CEST)
- INSEE/Postal code: 60042 /60140
- ^{1} French Land Register data, which excludes lakes, ponds, glaciers > 1 km^{2} (0.386 sq mi or 247 acres) and river estuaries.

Bailleval (French pronunciation: [bajval]) is a commune in the Oise department in northern France.

== Population ==
Historical population
Year	Pop.	±% p.a.
1968	646	—
1975	873	+4.40%
1982	1,044	+2.59%
1990	1,332	+3.09%
1999	1,421	+0.72%
2007	1,464	+0.37%
2012	1,473	+0.12%
2017	1,477	+0.05%
2023	1,483	+0.07%
Source: INSEE

== See also ==
- Communes of the Oise department
