= Boissy-le-Bois =

- Part of La Corne-en-Vexin
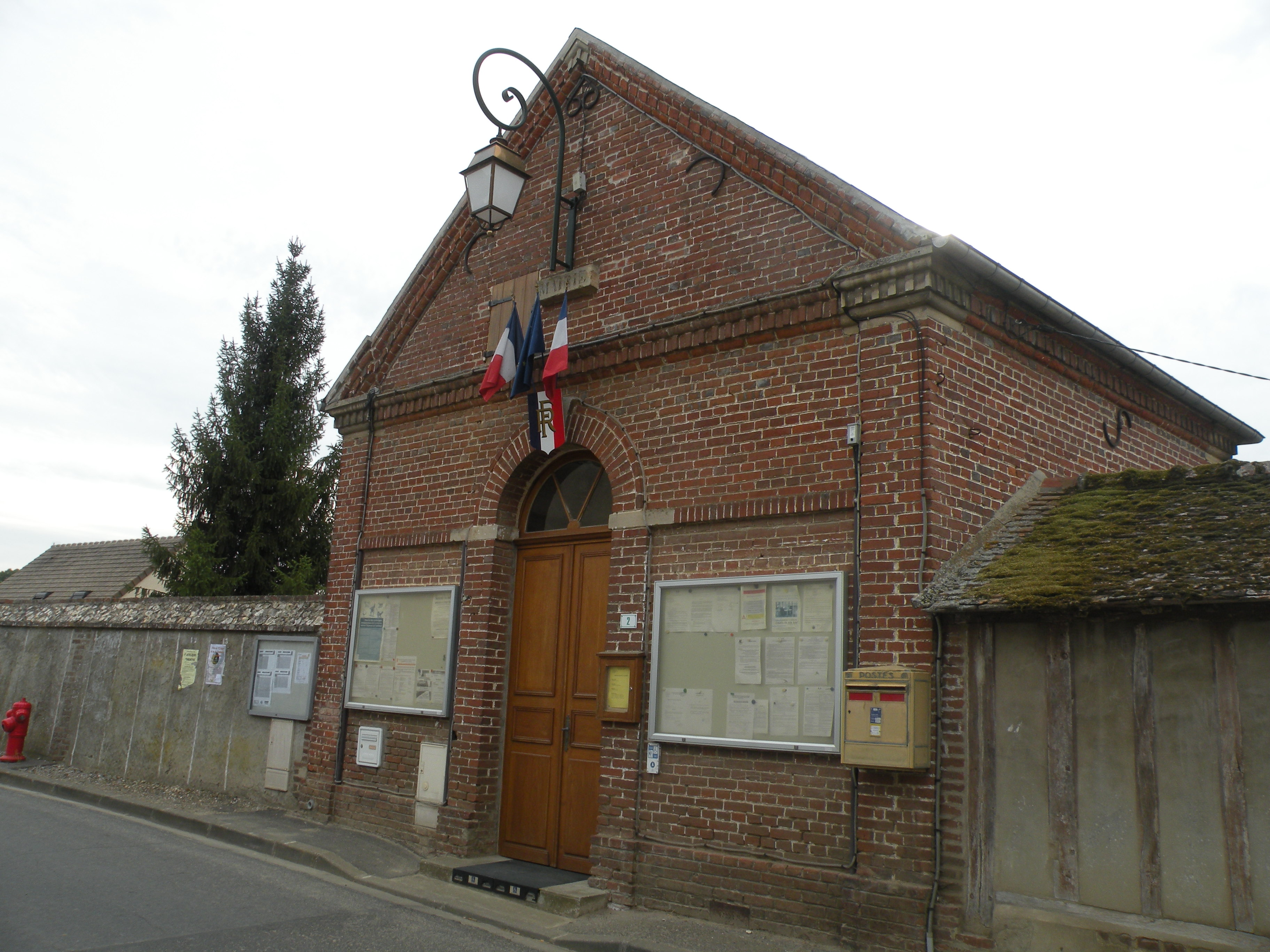
- The town hall in Boissy-le-Bois
- Location of Boissy-le-Bois
- Location within France Location within Hauts-de-France
- Coordinates: 49°16′41″N 1°56′38″E
- Country: France
- Region: Hauts-de-France
- Department: Oise
- Arrondissement: Beauvais
- Canton: Chaumont-en-Vexin
- Commune: La Corne-en-Vexin
- Area^{1}: 6.04 km^{2} (2.33 sq mi)
- Elevation: 101 m (331 ft)
- Highest elevation: 142 m (466 ft)
- Lowest elevation: 83 m (272 ft)
- Population (2023): 190
  - Density: 31/km^{2} (81/sq mi)
- Time zone: UTC+01:00 (CET)
  - Summer (DST): UTC+02:00 (CEST)
- Postal code: 60240
- ^{1} French Land Register data, which excludes lakes, ponds, glaciers > 1 km^{2} (0.386 sq mi or 247 acres) and river estuaries.

Boissy-le-Bois (French pronunciation: [bwasi lə bwa]) is a former commune in the Oise department in northern France. On 1 January 2019, it was merged into the new commune La Corne-en-Vexin.

== See also ==
- Communes of the Oise department
