= Le Breuil =

Le Breuil may refer to the following communes in France:

- Le Breuil, Allier, in the Allier département
- Le Breuil, Marne, in the Marne département
- Le Breuil, Rhône, in the Rhône département
- Le Breuil, Saône-et-Loire, in the Saône-et-Loire département
- Le Breuil-Bernard, in the Deux-Sèvres département
- Le Breuil-en-Auge, in the Calvados département
- Le Breuil-en-Bessin, in the Calvados département
- Le Breuil-sous-Argenton, in the Deux-Sèvres département
- Le Breuil-sur-Couze, in the Puy-de-Dôme département

== See also ==
- Breuil (disambiguation)
