= Rantigny =

- Commune
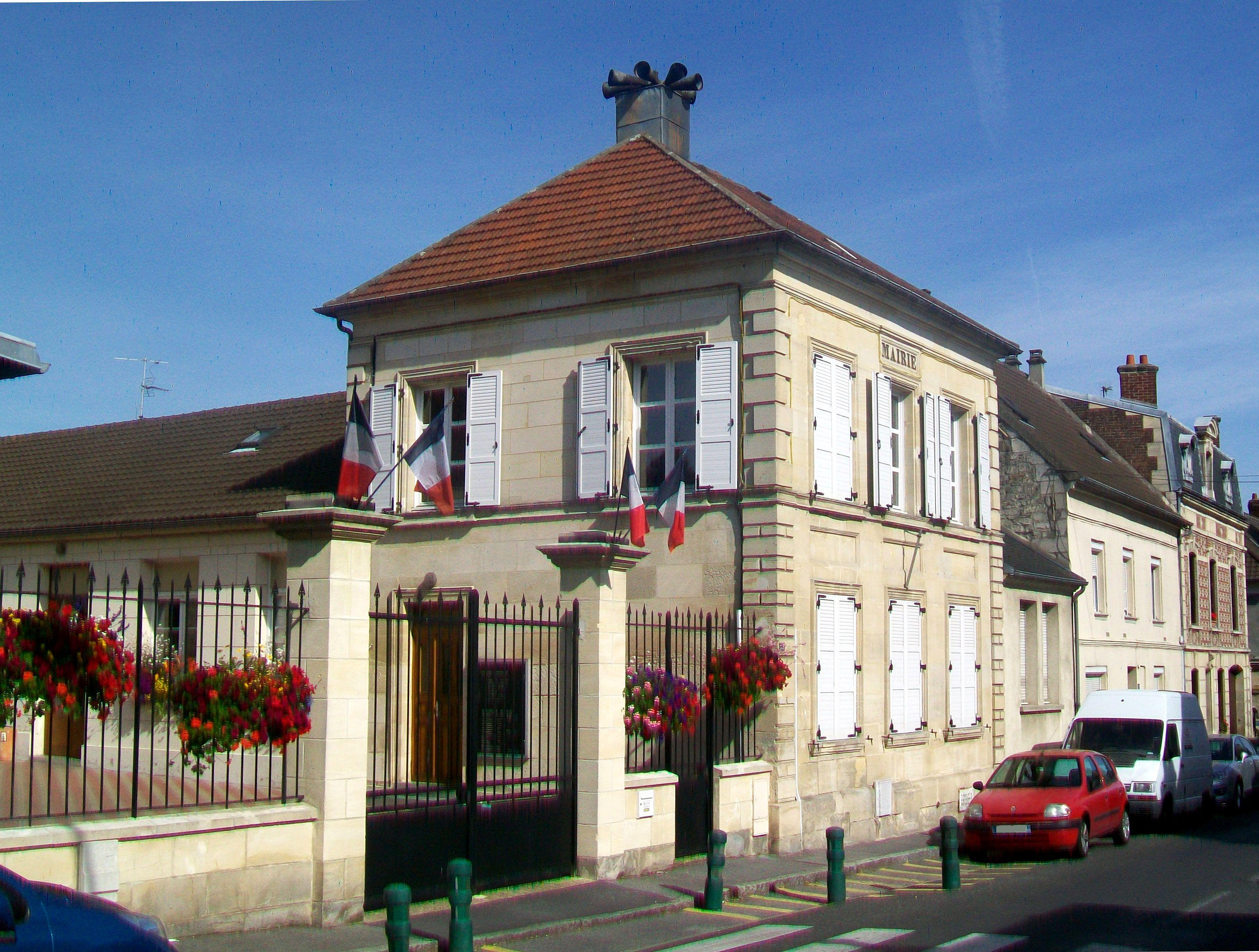
- The town hall in Rantigny
- Location of Rantigny
- Location within France Location within Hauts-de-France
- Coordinates: 49°19′50″N 2°26′32″E
- Country: France
- Region: Hauts-de-France
- Department: Oise
- Arrondissement: Clermont
- Canton: Clermont
- Intercommunality: Liancourtois

Government
  - Mayor (2020–2026): Dominique Delion
- Area^{1}: 4.16 km^{2} (1.61 sq mi)
- Highest elevation: 118 m (387 ft)
- Lowest elevation: 41 m (135 ft)
- Population (2023): 2,524
  - Density: 607/km^{2} (1,570/sq mi)
- Time zone: UTC+01:00 (CET)
  - Summer (DST): UTC+02:00 (CEST)
- INSEE/Postal code: 60524 /60290
- ^{1} French Land Register data, which excludes lakes, ponds, glaciers > 1 km^{2} (0.386 sq mi or 247 acres) and river estuaries.

Rantigny (French pronunciation: [ʁɑ̃tiɲi]) is a commune in the Oise department in northern France.

== Population ==
Historical population
Year	Pop.	±% p.a.
1968	1,901	—
1975	2,046	+1.06%
1982	2,034	−0.08%
1990	2,500	+2.61%
1999	2,521	+0.09%
2007	2,559	+0.19%
2012	2,586	+0.21%
2017	2,506	−0.63%
2023	2,524	+0.12%
Source: INSEE

== International relations ==
Rantigny is twinned with Villamagna, Italy.

== See also ==
- Communes of the Oise department
