= Fouilleuse =

- Commune
- Coat of arms
- Location of Fouilleuse
- Location within France Location within Hauts-de-France
- Coordinates: 49°25′46″N 2°32′15″E
- Country: France
- Region: Hauts-de-France
- Department: Oise
- Arrondissement: Clermont
- Canton: Clermont
- Intercommunality: Clermontois

Government
  - Mayor (2023–2026): Ghislaine Sorbara
- Area^{1}: 2.91 km^{2} (1.12 sq mi)
- Elevation: 154 m (505 ft)
- Highest elevation: 156 m (512 ft)
- Lowest elevation: 105 m (344 ft)
- Population (2023): 143
  - Density: 49.1/km^{2} (127/sq mi)
- Time zone: UTC+01:00 (CET)
  - Summer (DST): UTC+02:00 (CEST)
- INSEE/Postal code: 60247 /60190
- ^{1} French Land Register data, which excludes lakes, ponds, glaciers > 1 km^{2} (0.386 sq mi or 247 acres) and river estuaries.

Fouilleuse (French pronunciation: [fujøz]) is a commune in the Oise department in northern France.

== See also ==
- Communes of the Oise department
