= Rosoy, Oise =

Rosoy
- Commune
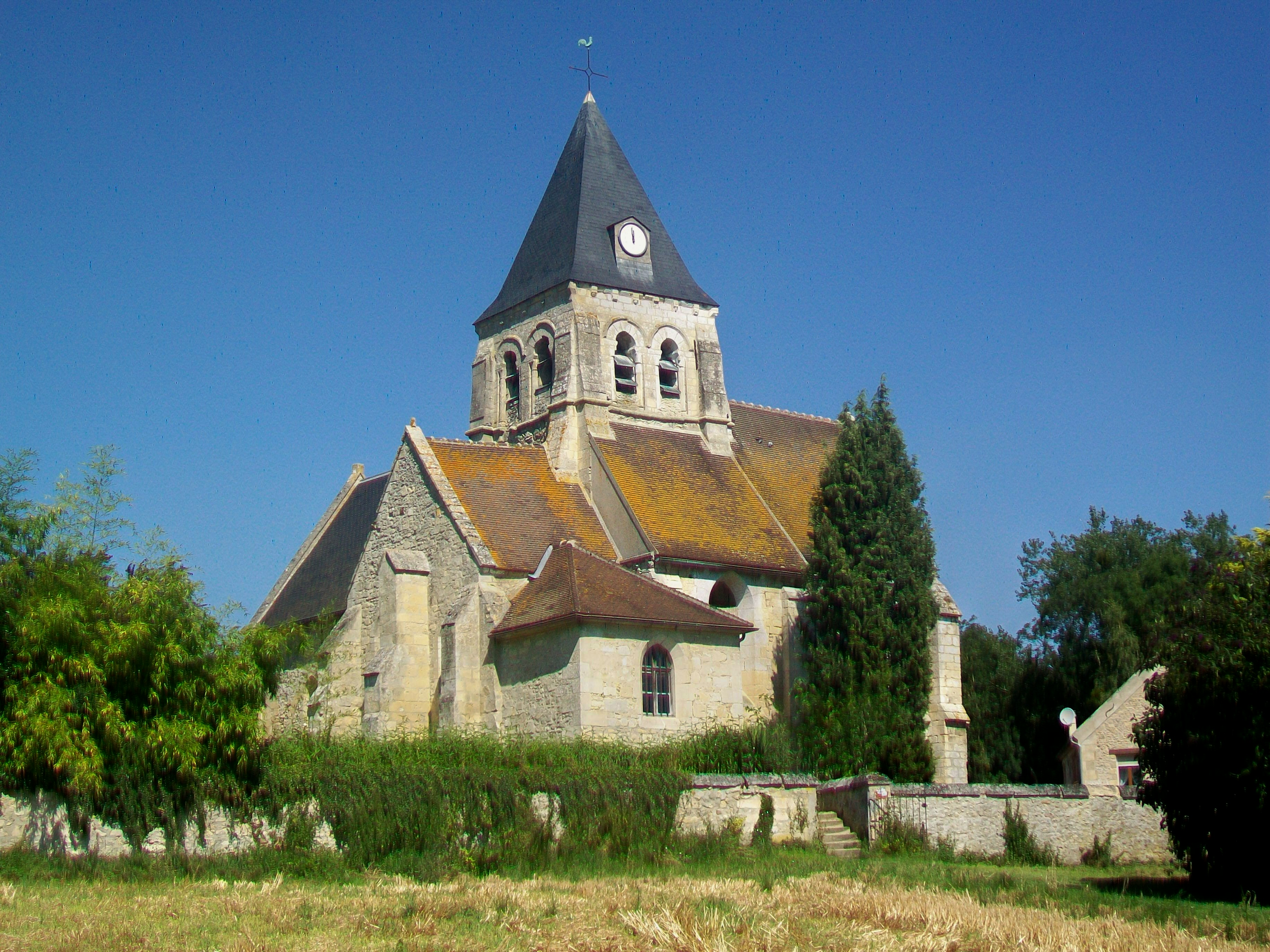
- The church in Rosoy
- Location of Rosoy
- Location within France Location within Hauts-de-France
- Coordinates: 49°20′28″N 2°30′07″E
- Country: France
- Region: Hauts-de-France
- Department: Oise
- Arrondissement: Clermont
- Canton: Clermont
- Intercommunality: Liancourtois

Government
  - Mayor (2020–2026): Gérard Lafitte
- Area^{1}: 4.95 km^{2} (1.91 sq mi)
- Elevation: 25 m (82 ft)
- Highest elevation: 139 m (456 ft)
- Lowest elevation: 32 m (105 ft)
- Population (2023): 622
  - Density: 126/km^{2} (325/sq mi)
- Time zone: UTC+01:00 (CET)
  - Summer (DST): UTC+02:00 (CEST)
- INSEE/Postal code: 60547 /60140
- ^{1} French Land Register data, which excludes lakes, ponds, glaciers > 1 km^{2} (0.386 sq mi or 247 acres) and river estuaries.

Rosoy (French pronunciation: [ʁozwa]) is a commune in the Oise department in northern France.

== See also ==
- Communes of the Oise department
