= Hémévillers =

- Commune
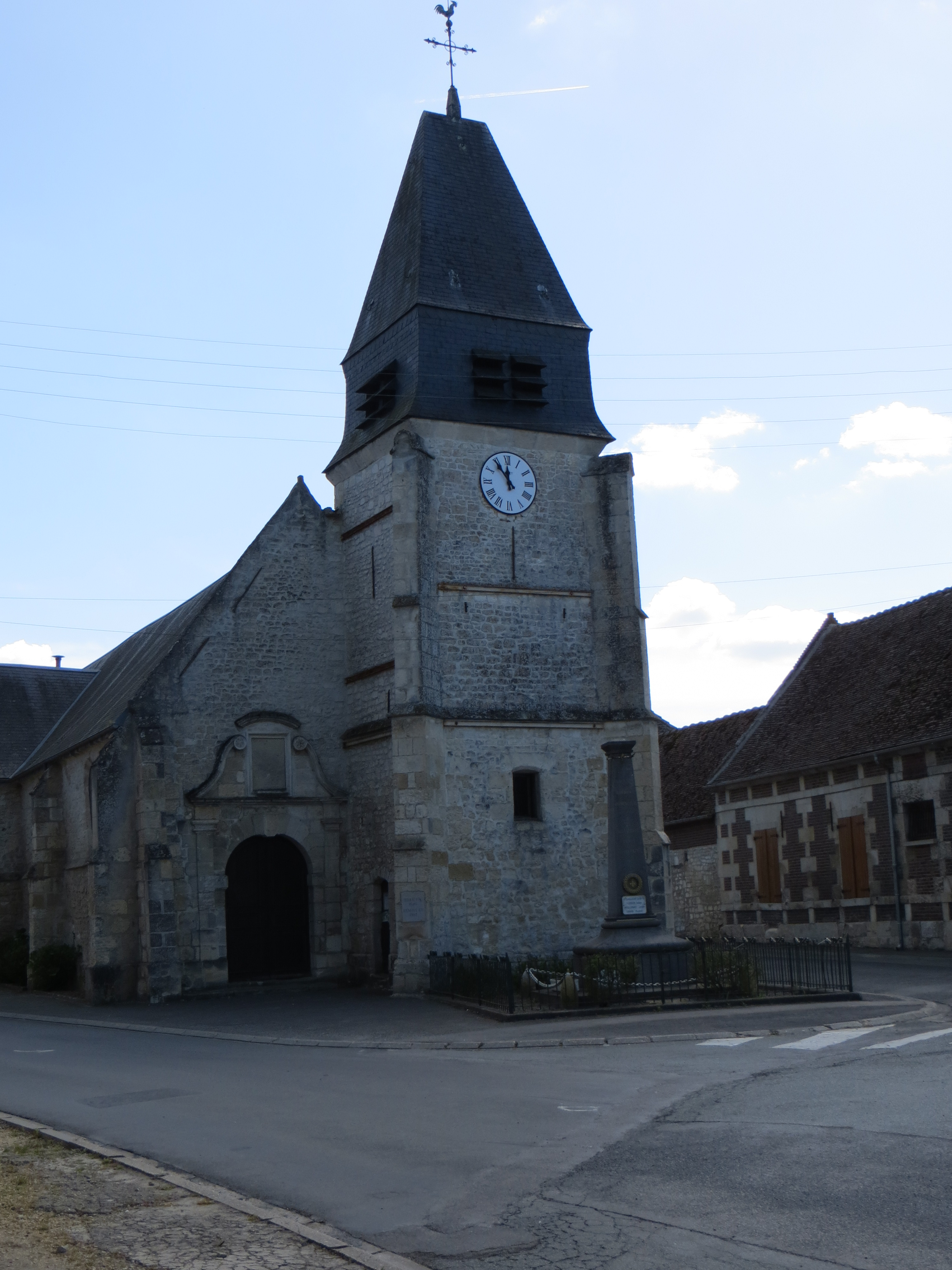
- The church in Hémévillers
- Location of Hémévillers
- Location within France Location within Hauts-de-France
- Coordinates: 49°27′51″N 2°40′28″E
- Country: France
- Region: Hauts-de-France
- Department: Oise
- Arrondissement: Compiègne
- Canton: Estrées-Saint-Denis
- Intercommunality: Plaine d'Estrées

Government
  - Mayor (2020–2026): Dominique Ydema
- Area^{1}: 6.93 km^{2} (2.68 sq mi)
- Elevation: 80 m (260 ft)
- Highest elevation: 98 m (322 ft)
- Lowest elevation: 50 m (160 ft)
- Population (2023): 463
  - Density: 66.8/km^{2} (173/sq mi)
- Time zone: UTC+01:00 (CET)
  - Summer (DST): UTC+02:00 (CEST)
- INSEE/Postal code: 60308 /60190
- ^{1} French Land Register data, which excludes lakes, ponds, glaciers > 1 km^{2} (0.386 sq mi or 247 acres) and river estuaries.

Hémévillers is a commune in the Oise department in northern France.

== See also ==
- Communes of the Oise department
