= Le Breil =

Le Breil may refer to:

- Le Breil-sur-Mérize, a commune in north-western France
- Lebreil, a commune in south-western France
