= Agnetz, Oise =

Agnetz
- Commune
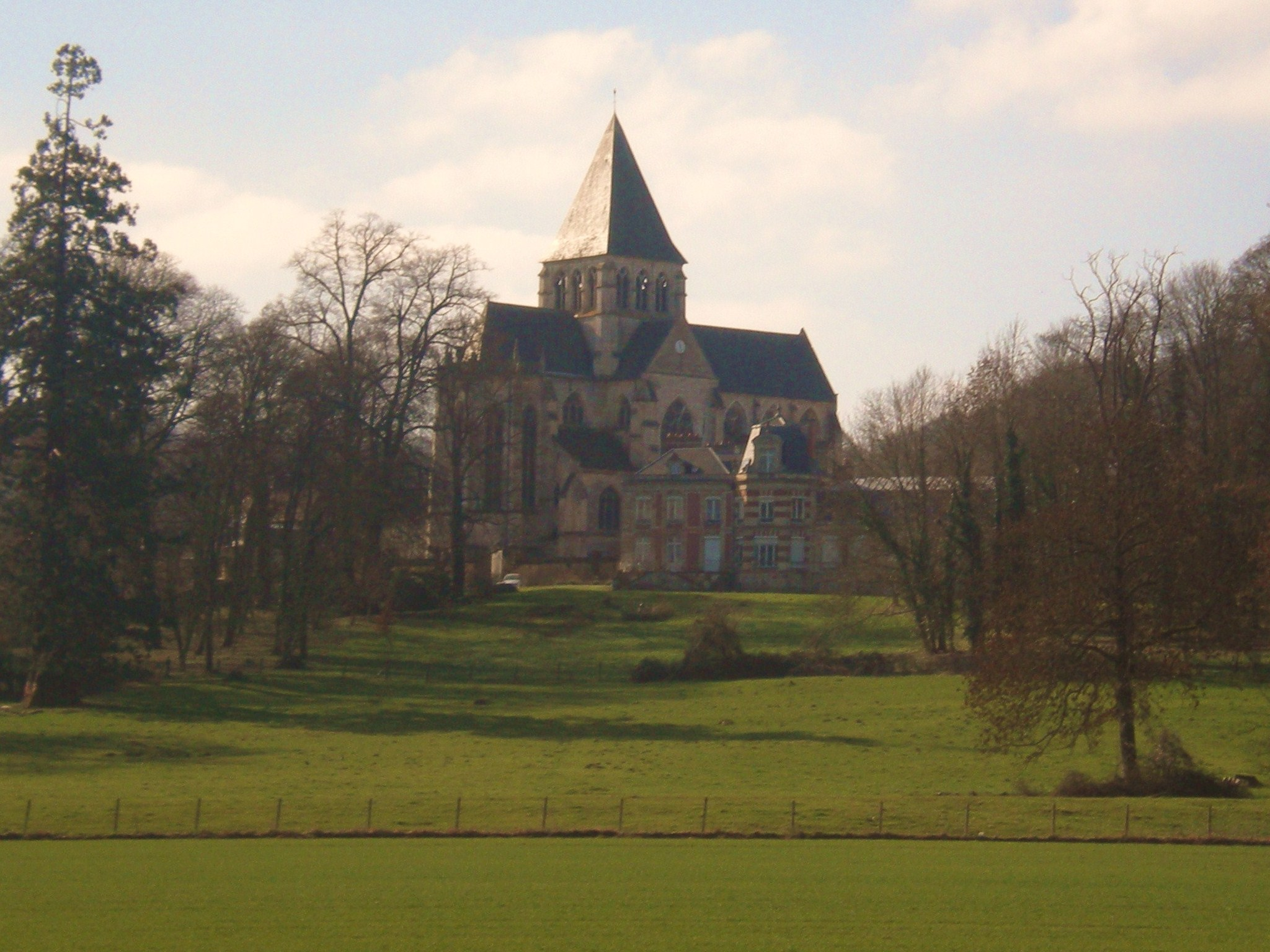
- The church in Agnetz

- Coat of arms
- Location of Agnetz
- Location within France Location within Hauts-de-France
- Coordinates: 49°22′59″N 2°23′06″E
- Country: France
- Region: Hauts-de-France
- Department: Oise
- Arrondissement: Clermont
- Canton: Clermont
- Intercommunality: Clermontois

Government
  - Mayor (2020–2026): Stéphanie Ansart
- Area^{1}: 12.94 km^{2} (5.00 sq mi)
- Elevation: 61 m (200 ft)
- Highest elevation: 163 m (535 ft)
- Lowest elevation: 52 m (171 ft)
- Population (2023): 3,058
  - Density: 236.3/km^{2} (612.1/sq mi)
- Time zone: UTC+01:00 (CET)
  - Summer (DST): UTC+02:00 (CEST)
- INSEE/Postal code: 60007 /60600
- ^{1} French Land Register data, which excludes lakes, ponds, glaciers > 1 km^{2} (0.386 sq mi or 247 acres) and river estuaries.

Agnetz (French pronunciation: [aɲɛ(s)]) is a commune in the Oise department in northern France.

== Population ==
Historical population
Year	Pop.	±% p.a.
1968	1,118	—
1975	1,373	+2.98%
1982	1,801	+3.95%
1990	2,134	+2.14%
1999	2,637	+2.38%
2007	2,842	+0.94%
2012	2,977	+0.93%
2017	3,050	+0.49%
2023	3,058	+0.04%
Source: INSEE

== Heraldry ==
Arms of Agnetz	The arms of the commune of Agnetz are blazoned : Quarterly, 1: Azure, 3 fleurs-de-lys Or; 2: Gules, a bend coticed argent; 3: Gules, a martlet Or and on a canton argent a dagger inverted bendwise gules; 4: Azure, 3 triple-towered castles Or.

== See also ==
- Communes of the Oise department
