= Breuil-le-Vert =

- Commune
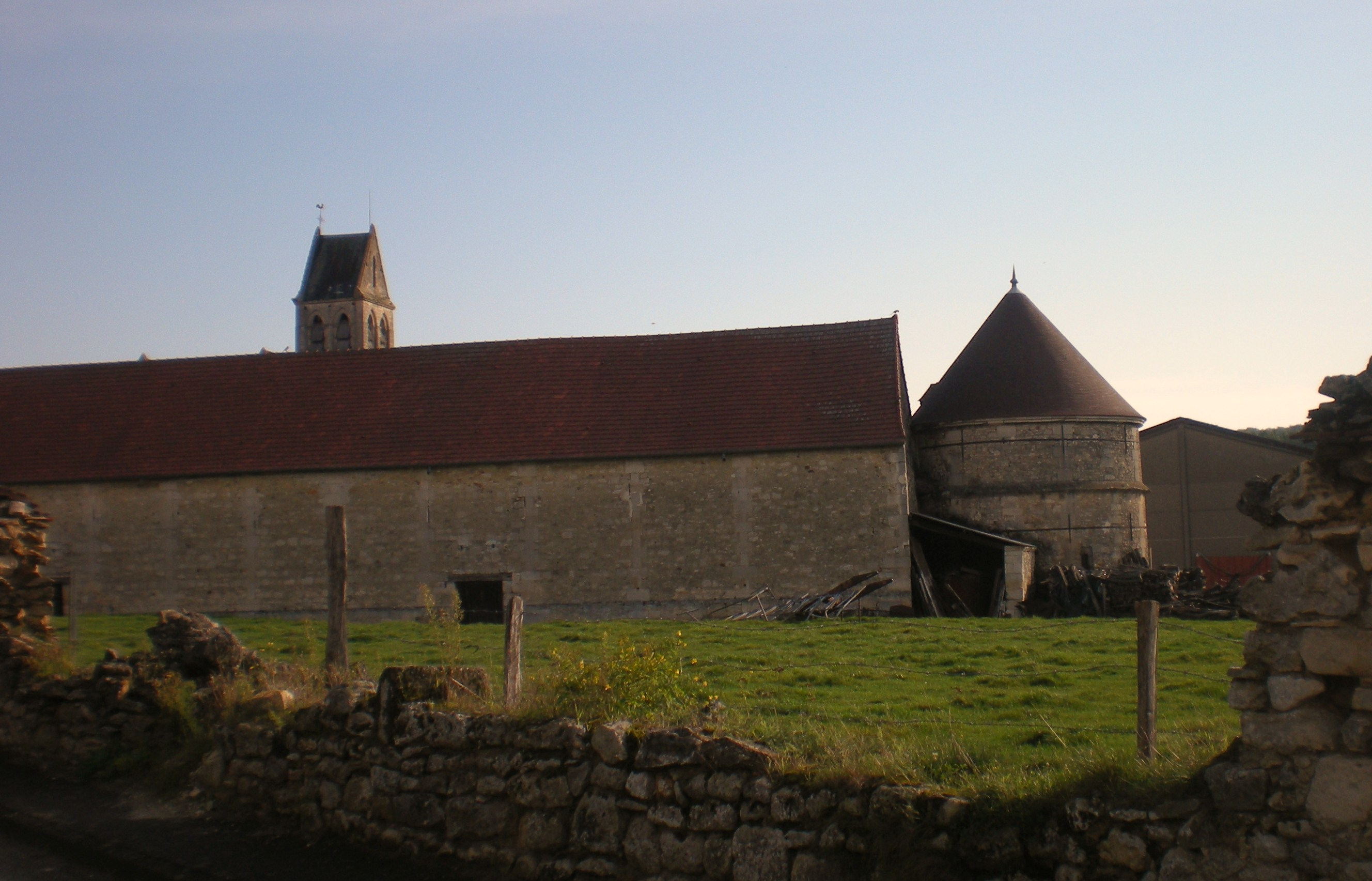
- The church in Breuil-le-Vert

- Coat of arms
- Location of Breuil-le-Vert
- Location within France Location within Hauts-de-France
- Coordinates: 49°21′42″N 2°26′15″E
- Country: France
- Region: Hauts-de-France
- Department: Oise
- Arrondissement: Clermont
- Canton: Clermont
- Intercommunality: Clermontois

Government
  - Mayor (2020–2026): Jean-Philippe Vichard
- Area^{1}: 7.37 km^{2} (2.85 sq mi)
- Elevation: 51 m (167 ft)
- Highest elevation: 150 m (490 ft)
- Lowest elevation: 45 m (148 ft)
- Population (2023): 3,183
  - Density: 432/km^{2} (1,120/sq mi)
- Time zone: UTC+01:00 (CET)
  - Summer (DST): UTC+02:00 (CEST)
- INSEE/Postal code: 60107 /60600
- ^{1} French Land Register data, which excludes lakes, ponds, glaciers > 1 km^{2} (0.386 sq mi or 247 acres) and river estuaries.

Breuil-le-Vert (French pronunciation: [bʁœj lə vɛʁ]) is a commune in the Oise department in northern France

== Population ==
Historical population

Year	Pop.	±% p.a.
1793	580	—
1821	736	+0.85%
1846	817	+0.42%
1872	851	+0.16%
1901	752	−0.43%
1926	793	+0.21%
1946	1,010	+1.22%
1962	960	−0.32%
1968	1,106	+2.39%

Year	Pop.	±% p.a.
1975	1,486	+4.31%
1982	2,127	+5.26%
1990	2,785	+3.43%
1999	2,819	+0.13%
2007	2,823	+0.02%
2012	2,900	+0.54%
2017	3,087	+1.26%
2023	3,183	+0.51%

Source: EHESS and INSEE (1968-2023)

== See also ==
- Communes of the Oise department
