= Breuil-le-Sec =

- Commune
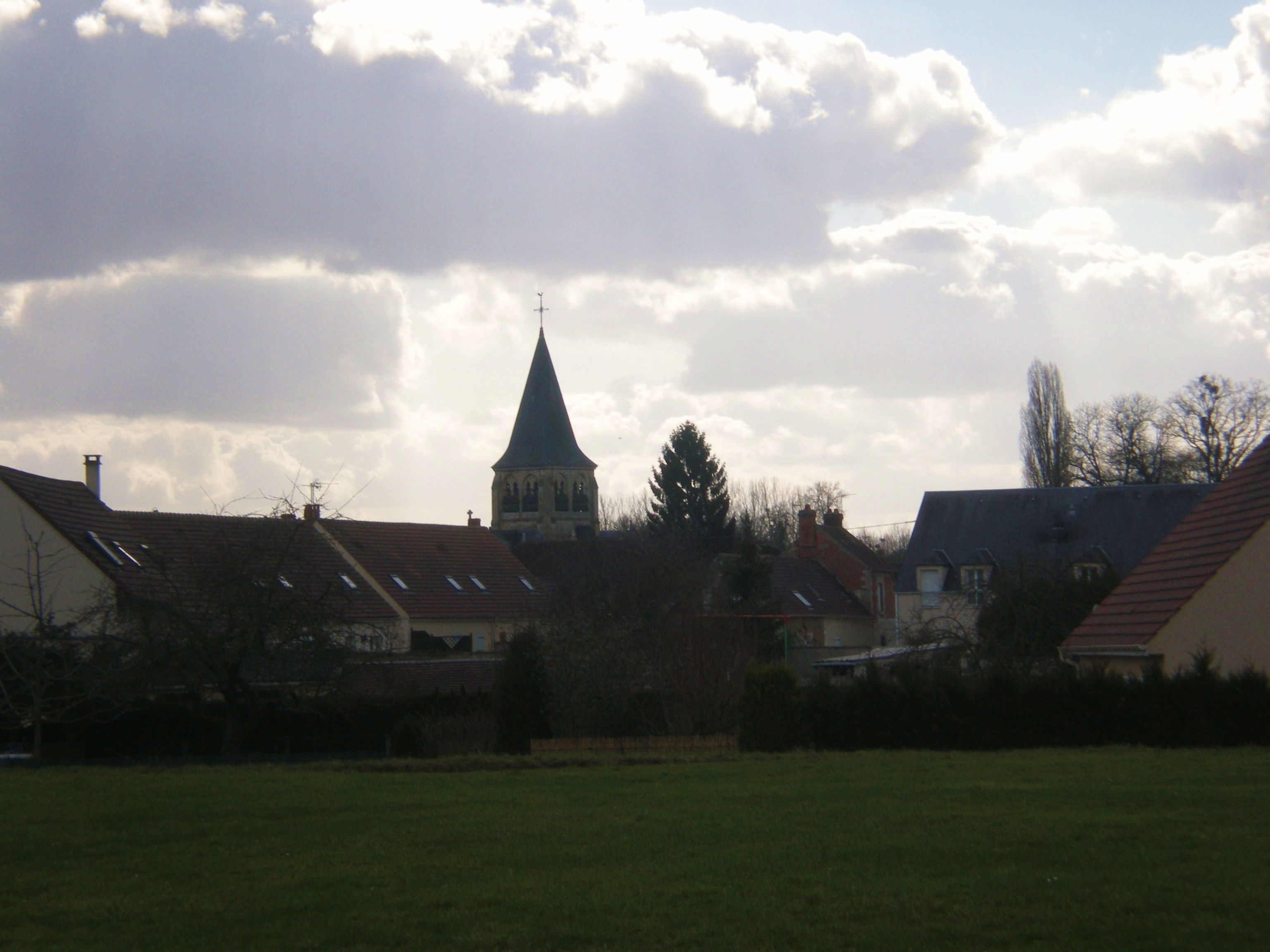
- A general view of Breuil-le-Sec

- Coat of arms
- Location of Breuil-le-Sec
- Location within France Location within Hauts-de-France
- Coordinates: 49°22′15″N 2°27′11″E
- Country: France
- Region: Hauts-de-France
- Department: Oise
- Arrondissement: Clermont
- Canton: Clermont
- Intercommunality: Clermontois

Government
  - Mayor (2020–2026): Denis Dupuis
- Area^{1}: 8.89 km^{2} (3.43 sq mi)
- Elevation: 61 m (200 ft)
- Highest elevation: 152 m (499 ft)
- Lowest elevation: 46 m (151 ft)
- Population (2023): 2,467
  - Density: 278/km^{2} (719/sq mi)
- Time zone: UTC+01:00 (CET)
  - Summer (DST): UTC+02:00 (CEST)
- INSEE/Postal code: 60106 /60840
- ^{1} French Land Register data, which excludes lakes, ponds, glaciers > 1 km^{2} (0.386 sq mi or 247 acres) and river estuaries.

Breuil-le-Sec (French pronunciation: [bʁœj lə sɛk]) is a commune in the Oise department in northern France.

== Population ==
Historical population

Year	Pop.	±% p.a.
1793	620	—
1821	572	−0.29%
1846	506	−0.49%
1872	503	−0.02%
1901	490	−0.09%
1926	492	+0.02%
1946	636	+1.29%
1962	2,168	+7.97%
1968	2,200	+0.24%

Year	Pop.	±% p.a.
1975	2,321	+0.77%
1982	2,421	+0.60%
1990	2,416	−0.03%
1999	2,055	−1.78%
2007	2,330	+1.58%
2012	2,463	+1.12%
2017	2,648	+1.46%
2023	2,467	−1.17%

Source: EHESS and INSEE (1968-2023)

== See also ==
- Communes of the Oise department
