= Froissy =

- Commune
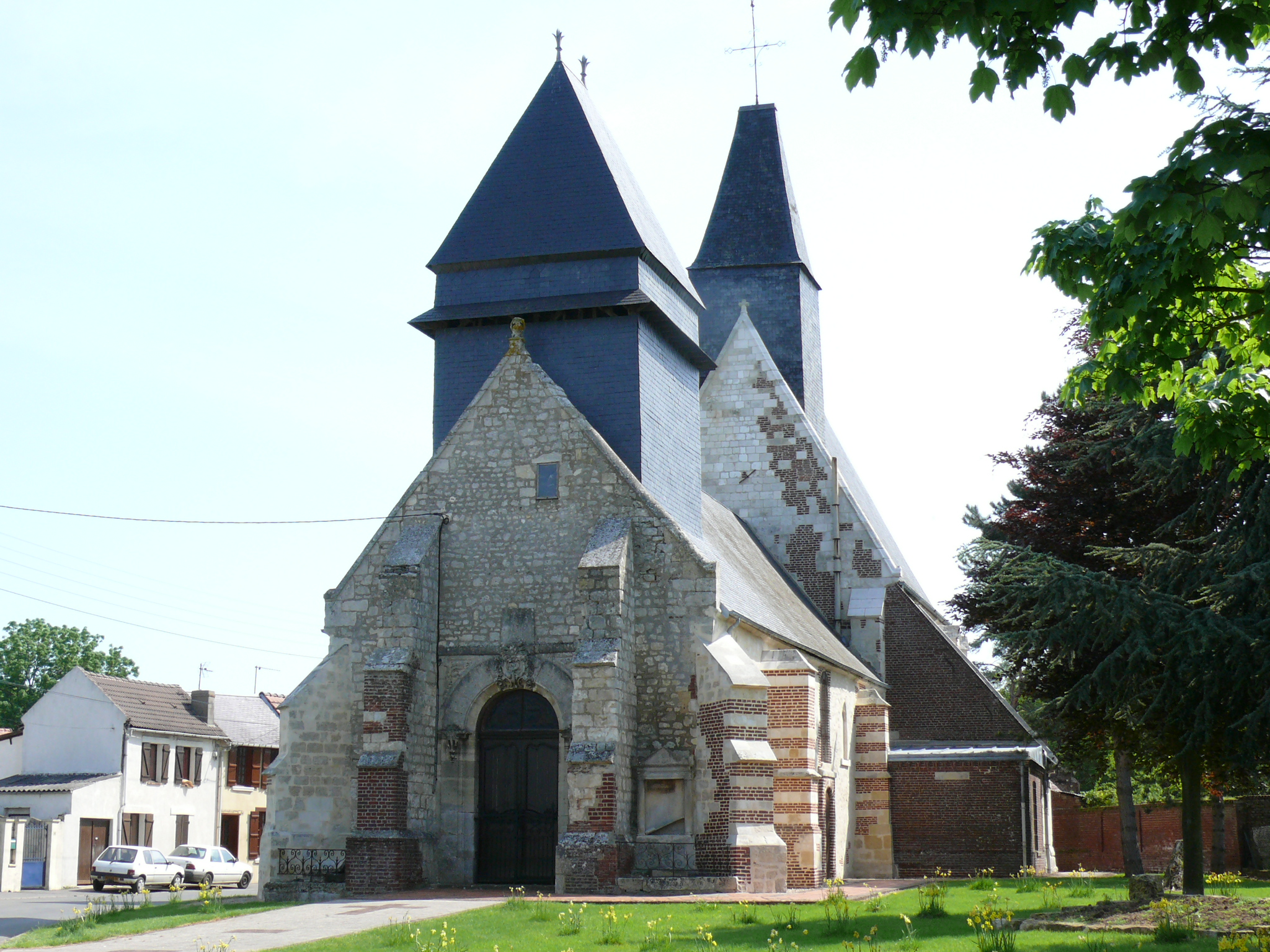
- The church in Froissy
- Location of Froissy
- Location within France Location within Hauts-de-France
- Coordinates: 49°34′04″N 2°13′19″E
- Country: France
- Region: Hauts-de-France
- Department: Oise
- Arrondissement: Clermont
- Canton: Saint-Just-en-Chaussée

Government
  - Mayor (2020–2026): Mikaël Feigueux
- Area^{1}: 6.37 km^{2} (2.46 sq mi)
- Elevation: 176 m (577 ft)
- Highest elevation: 164 m (538 ft)
- Lowest elevation: 119 m (390 ft)
- Population (2023): 962
  - Density: 151/km^{2} (391/sq mi)
- Time zone: UTC+01:00 (CET)
  - Summer (DST): UTC+02:00 (CEST)
- INSEE/Postal code: 60265 /60480
- ^{1} French Land Register data, which excludes lakes, ponds, glaciers > 1 km^{2} (0.386 sq mi or 247 acres) and river estuaries.

Froissy (French pronunciation: [fʁwasi]) is a commune in the Oise department in northern France. On November 25, 1968, the village was the site of a fire at a home for disabled children that killed 14 boys and girls ranging in age from 10 to 14 years of age.

== See also ==
- Communes of the Oise department
