= Godenvillers =

- Commune
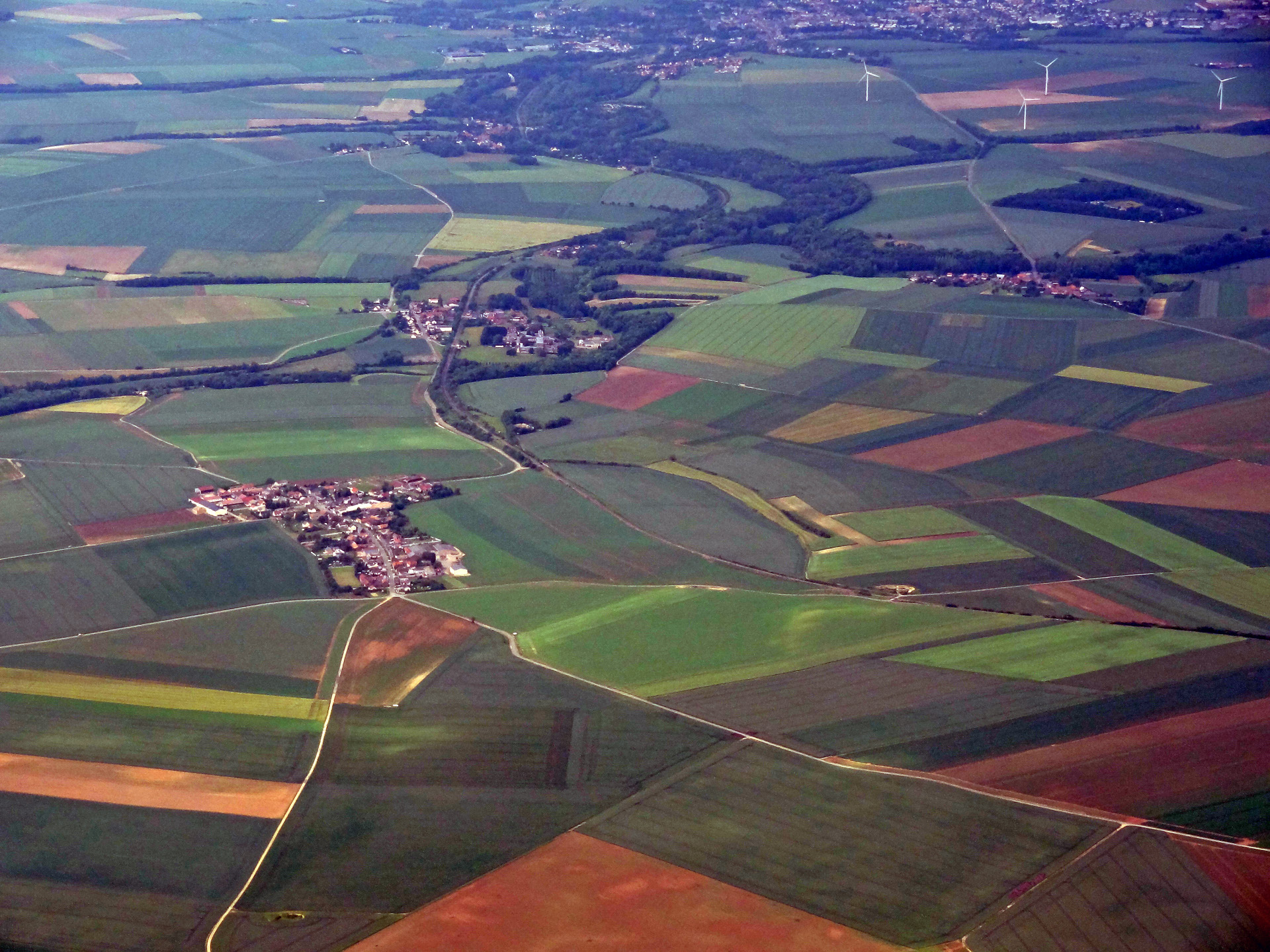
- An aerial view of Godenvillers and Domfront

- Coat of arms
- Location of Godenvillers
- Location within France Location within Hauts-de-France
- Coordinates: 49°35′23″N 2°33′13″E
- Country: France
- Region: Hauts-de-France
- Department: Oise
- Arrondissement: Clermont
- Canton: Estrées-Saint-Denis
- Intercommunality: Plateau Picard

Government
  - Mayor (2020–2026): Alain Fournier
- Area^{1}: 5.18 km^{2} (2.00 sq mi)
- Elevation: 90 m (300 ft)
- Highest elevation: 117 m (384 ft)
- Lowest elevation: 75 m (246 ft)
- Population (2023): 196
  - Density: 37.8/km^{2} (98.0/sq mi)
- Time zone: UTC+01:00 (CET)
  - Summer (DST): UTC+02:00 (CEST)
- INSEE/Postal code: 60276 /60420
- ^{1} French Land Register data, which excludes lakes, ponds, glaciers > 1 km^{2} (0.386 sq mi or 247 acres) and river estuaries.

Godenvillers (French pronunciation: [ɡɔdɑ̃vile]) is a commune in the Oise department in northern France.

== See also ==
- Communes of the Oise department
