= Fleury, Oise =

Fleury
- Commune
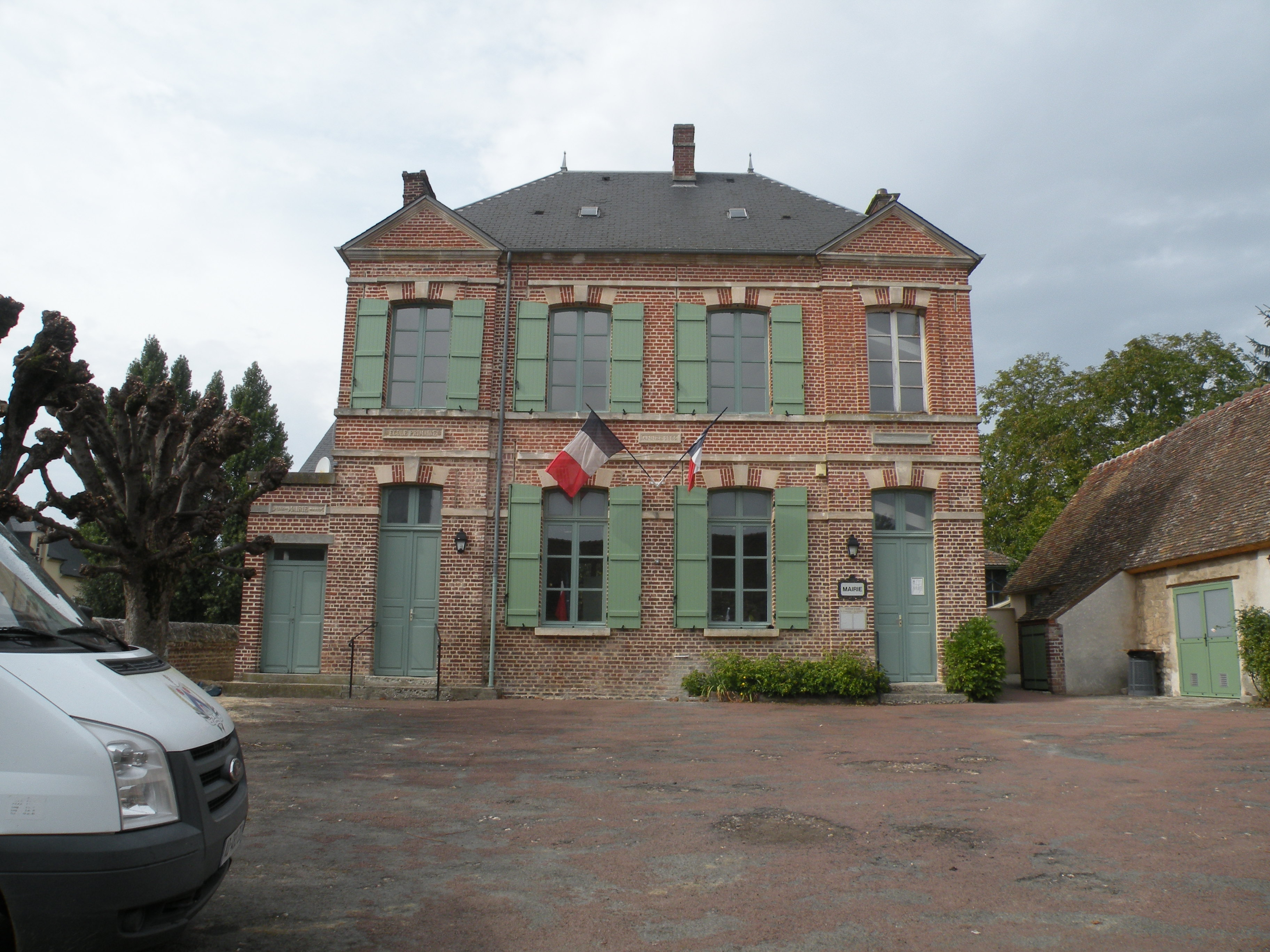
- The town hall in Fleury

- Coat of arms
- Location of Fleury
- Location within France Location within Hauts-de-France
- Coordinates: 49°14′44″N 1°58′14″E
- Country: France
- Region: Hauts-de-France
- Department: Oise
- Arrondissement: Beauvais
- Canton: Chaumont-en-Vexin
- Intercommunality: Vexin Thelle

Government
  - Mayor (2020–2026): Sebastien Marie
- Area^{1}: 6.29 km^{2} (2.43 sq mi)
- Elevation: 79 m (259 ft)
- Highest elevation: 120 m (390 ft)
- Lowest elevation: 68 m (223 ft)
- Population (2023): 592
  - Density: 94.1/km^{2} (244/sq mi)
- Time zone: UTC+01:00 (CET)
  - Summer (DST): UTC+02:00 (CEST)
- INSEE/Postal code: 60239 /60240
- ^{1} French Land Register data, which excludes lakes, ponds, glaciers > 1 km^{2} (0.386 sq mi or 247 acres) and river estuaries.

Fleury (French pronunciation: [flœʁi]) is a commune in the Oise department in northern France.

== See also ==
- Communes of the Oise department
