= Énencourt-le-Sec =

- Part of La Corne-en-Vexin
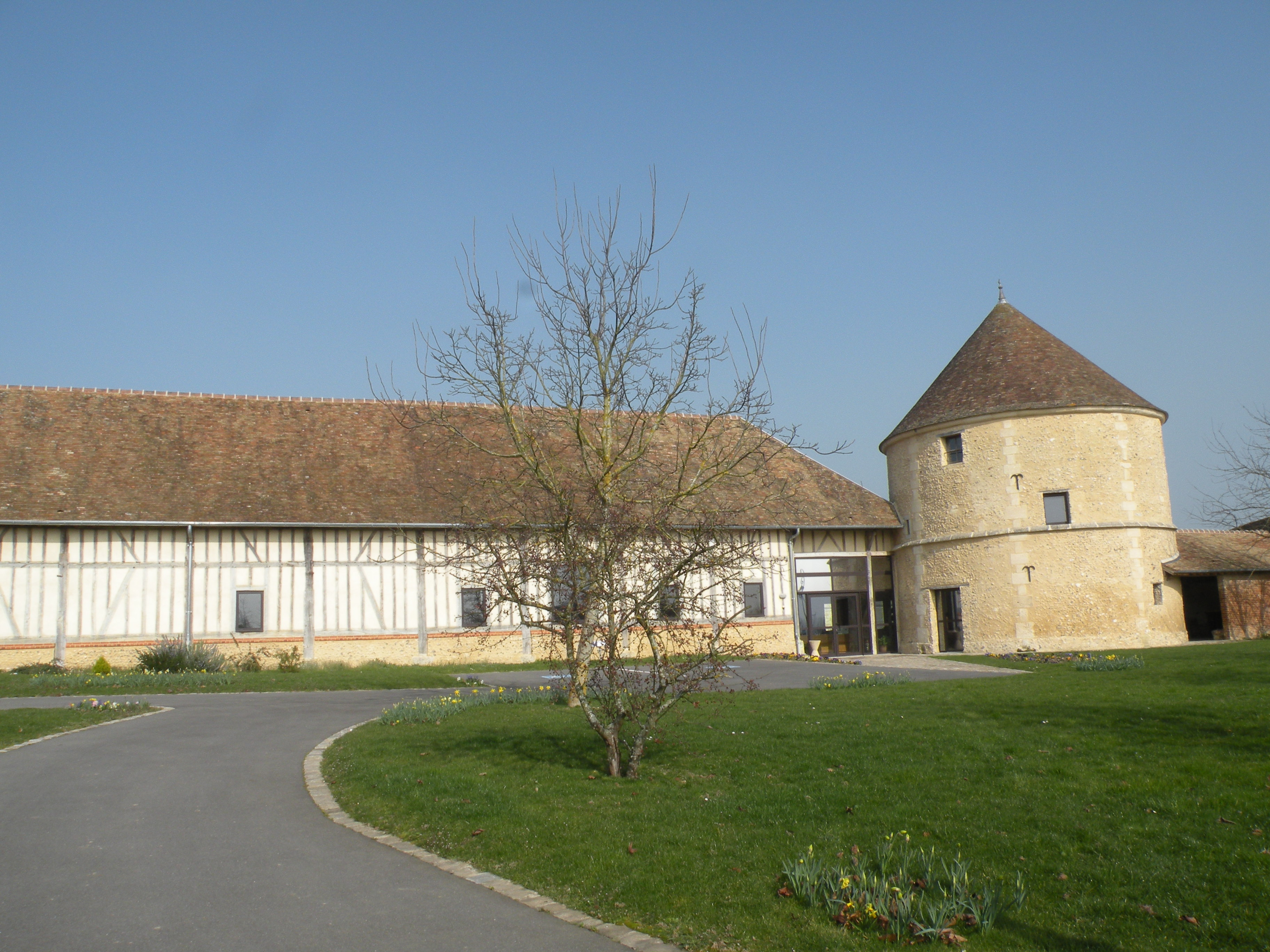
- The town hall in Énencourt-le-Sec

- Coat of arms
- Location of Énencourt-le-Sec
- Location within France Location within Hauts-de-France
- Coordinates: 49°17′55″N 1°55′23″E
- Country: France
- Region: Hauts-de-France
- Department: Oise
- Arrondissement: Beauvais
- Canton: Chaumont-en-Vexin
- Commune: La Corne-en-Vexin
- Area^{1}: 5.99 km^{2} (2.31 sq mi)
- Elevation: 100 m (330 ft)
- Highest elevation: 136 m (446 ft)
- Lowest elevation: 89 m (292 ft)
- Population (2022): 189
  - Density: 31.6/km^{2} (81.7/sq mi)
- Time zone: UTC+01:00 (CET)
  - Summer (DST): UTC+02:00 (CEST)
- Postal code: 60240
- ^{1} French Land Register data, which excludes lakes, ponds, glaciers > 1 km^{2} (0.386 sq mi or 247 acres) and river estuaries.

Énencourt-le-Sec (French pronunciation: [enɑ̃kuʁ lə sɛk]) is a former commune in the Oise department in northern France. On 1 January 2019, it was merged into the new commune La Corne-en-Vexin.

== See also ==
- Communes of the Oise department
