= Erquery =

- Commune
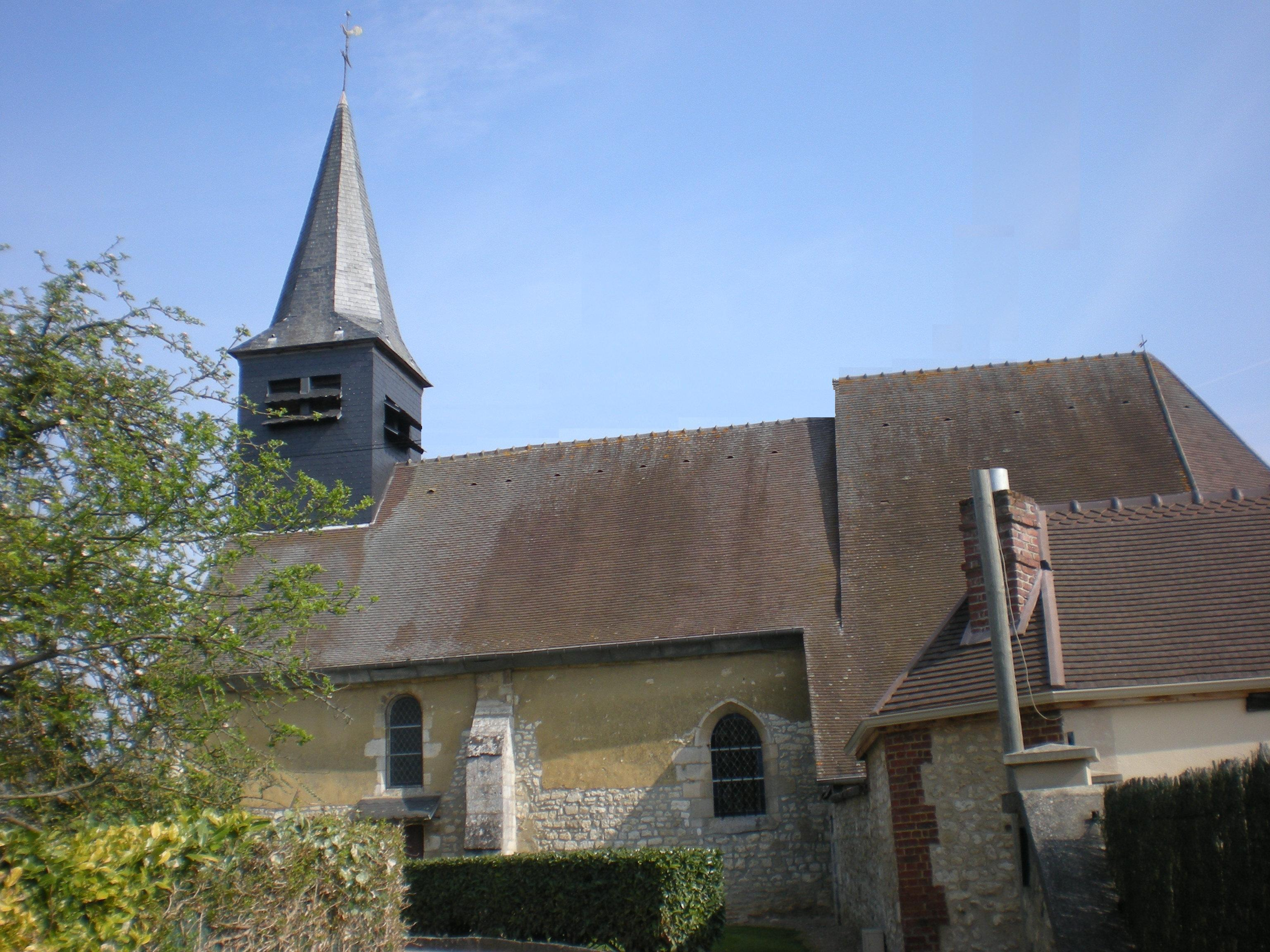
- Church of Our Lady of Erquery

- Coat of arms
- Location of Erquery
- Location within France Location within Hauts-de-France
- Coordinates: 49°24′34″N 2°27′30″E
- Country: France
- Region: Hauts-de-France
- Department: Oise
- Arrondissement: Clermont
- Canton: Clermont
- Intercommunality: Clermontois

Government
  - Mayor (2020–2026): Stéphane Lecomte
- Area^{1}: 5.91 km^{2} (2.28 sq mi)
- Elevation: 100 m (330 ft)
- Highest elevation: 135 m (443 ft)
- Lowest elevation: 57 m (187 ft)
- Population (2023): 589
  - Density: 99.7/km^{2} (258/sq mi)
- Time zone: UTC+01:00 (CET)
  - Summer (DST): UTC+02:00 (CEST)
- INSEE/Postal code: 60215 /60600
- ^{1} French Land Register data, which excludes lakes, ponds, glaciers > 1 km^{2} (0.386 sq mi or 247 acres) and river estuaries.

Erquery (French pronunciation: [ɛʁkəʁi]) is a commune in the Oise department in northern France.

== See also ==
- Communes of the Oise department
