= Francières, Oise =

Francières
- Commune
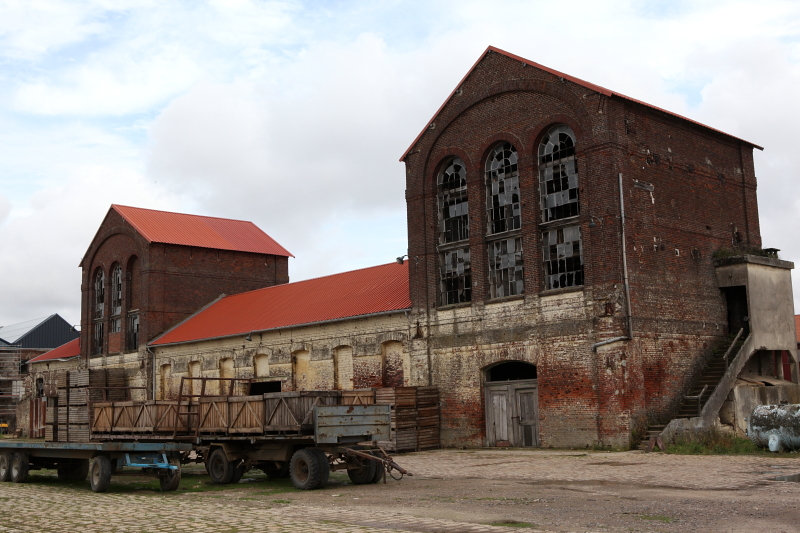
- The sugar refinery in Francières

- Coat of arms
- Location of Francières
- Location within France Location within Hauts-de-France
- Coordinates: 49°26′56″N 2°40′49″E
- Country: France
- Region: Hauts-de-France
- Department: Oise
- Arrondissement: Compiègne
- Canton: Estrées-Saint-Denis
- Intercommunality: Plaine d'Estrées

Government
  - Mayor (2020–2026): Jean-Marie Soen
- Area^{1}: 8.23 km^{2} (3.18 sq mi)
- Elevation: 75 m (246 ft)
- Highest elevation: 94 m (308 ft)
- Lowest elevation: 62 m (203 ft)
- Population (2023): 543
  - Density: 66.0/km^{2} (171/sq mi)
- Time zone: UTC+01:00 (CET)
  - Summer (DST): UTC+02:00 (CEST)
- INSEE/Postal code: 60254 /60190
- ^{1} French Land Register data, which excludes lakes, ponds, glaciers > 1 km^{2} (0.386 sq mi or 247 acres) and river estuaries.

Francières (French pronunciation: [fʁɑ̃sjɛʁ]) is a commune in the Oise department in northern France.

== See also ==
- Communes of the Oise department
