= Canton of Coucy-le-Château-Auffrique =

Coordinates: 49°31′13″N 3°19′21″E

Coucy-le-Château-Auffrique
- Former canton
- Interactive map of Coucy-le-Château-Auffrique
- Country: France
- Region: Hauts-de-France
- Department: Aisne
- No. of communes: {{{nbcomm}}}
- Disbanded: 2015
- Area: 244.58 km^{2} (94.43 sq mi)
- Population (2012): 11,720
  - Density: 47.92/km^{2} (124.1/sq mi)

The canton of Coucy-le-Château-Auffrique is a former administrative division in northern France. It was disbanded following the French canton reorganisation which came into effect in March 2015. It had 11,720 inhabitants (2012).

The canton comprised the following communes:

- Audignicourt
- Barisis
- Besmé
- Bichancourt
- Blérancourt
- Bourguignon-sous-Coucy
- Camelin
- Champs
- Coucy-le-Château-Auffrique
- Coucy-la-Ville
- Crécy-au-Mont
- Folembray
- Fresnes
- Guny
- Jumencourt
- Landricourt
- Leuilly-sous-Coucy
- Manicamp
- Pierremande
- Pont-Saint-Mard
- Quierzy
- Quincy-Basse
- Saint-Aubin
- Saint-Paul-aux-Bois
- Selens
- Septvaux
- Trosly-Loire
- Vassens
- Verneuil-sous-Coucy

== Demographics ==
Historical population Canton of Coucy-le-Château-Auffrique
Year	1962	1968	1975	1982	1990	1999
Pop.	10,426	11,116	10,891	11,064	11,247	11,146
±%	—	+6.6%	−2.0%	+1.6%	+1.7%	−0.9%
From the year 1962 on: No double counting – residents of multiple communes (e.g. students and military personnel) are counted only once. Source: INSEE

== See also ==
- Cantons of the Aisne department
