= Cutry =

Cutry may refer to the following places in France:

- Cutry, Aisne, a commune in the department of Aisne
- Cutry, Meurthe-et-Moselle, a commune in the department of Meurthe-et-Moselle
