= Canton of Vic-sur-Aisne =

Coordinates: 49°24′N 3°07′E

Vic-sur-Aisne
- Canton
- Interactive map of Vic-sur-Aisne
- Country: France
- Region: Hauts-de-France
- Department: Aisne
- No. of communes: {{{nbcomm}}}
- Area: 437.40 km^{2} (168.88 sq mi)
- Population (2023): 20,780
  - Density: 47.51/km^{2} (123.0/sq mi)
- INSEE code: 02 20

The canton of Vic-sur-Aisne is an administrative division in northern France. At the French canton reorganisation which came into effect in March 2015, the canton was expanded from 25 to 50 communes:

1. Ambleny
2. Audignicourt
3. Barisis-aux-Bois
4. Berny-Rivière
5. Besmé
6. Bichancourt
7. Bieuxy
8. Blérancourt
9. Bourguignon-sous-Coucy
10. Camelin
11. Champs
12. Cœuvres-et-Valsery
13. Coucy-le-Château-Auffrique
14. Coucy-la-Ville
15. Crécy-au-Mont
16. Cutry
17. Dommiers
18. Épagny
19. Folembray
20. Fontenoy
21. Fresnes-sous-Coucy
22. Guny
23. Jumencourt
24. Landricourt
25. Laversine
26. Leuilly-sous-Coucy
27. Manicamp
28. Montigny-Lengrain
29. Morsain
30. Mortefontaine
31. Nouvron-Vingré
32. Pernant
33. Pont-Saint-Mard
34. Quierzy
35. Quincy-Basse
36. Ressons-le-Long
37. Saconin-et-Breuil
38. Saint-Aubin
39. Saint-Bandry
40. Saint-Christophe-à-Berry
41. Saint-Paul-aux-Bois
42. Saint-Pierre-Aigle
43. Selens
44. Septvaux
45. Tartiers
46. Trosly-Loire
47. Vassens
48. Verneuil-sous-Coucy
49. Vézaponin
50. Vic-sur-Aisne

== Demographics ==
Historical population
Year	Pop.	±% p.a.
2013	21,547	—
2018	21,234	−0.29%
Source: INSEE

== See also ==
- Cantons of the Aisne department
- Communes of France
