= Mortefontaine, Aisne =

Mortefontaine
- Commune
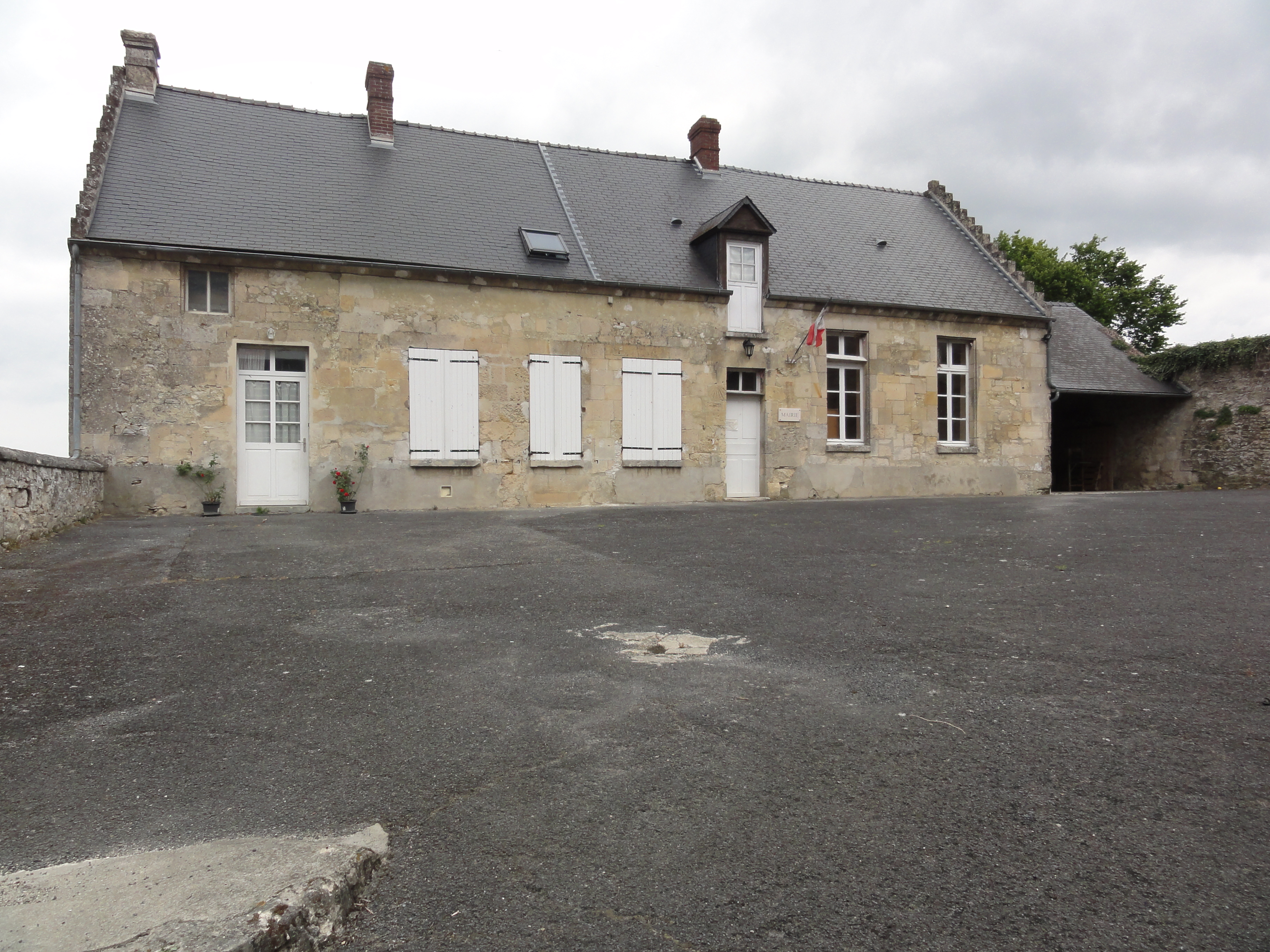
- The town hall of Mortefontaine
- Location of Mortefontaine
- Location within France Location within Hauts-de-France
- Coordinates: 49°19′57″N 3°04′37″E
- Country: France
- Region: Hauts-de-France
- Department: Aisne
- Arrondissement: Soissons
- Canton: Vic-sur-Aisne

Government
  - Mayor (2026–32): Benoît Davin
- Area^{1}: 11.9 km^{2} (4.6 sq mi)
- Elevation: 142 m (466 ft)
- Highest elevation: 162 m (531 ft)
- Lowest elevation: 64 m (210 ft)
- Population (2023): 208
  - Density: 17.5/km^{2} (45.3/sq mi)
- Time zone: UTC+01:00 (CET)
  - Summer (DST): UTC+02:00 (CEST)
- INSEE/Postal code: 02528 /02600
- ^{1} French Land Register data, which excludes lakes, ponds, glaciers > 1 km^{2} (0.386 sq mi or 247 acres) and river estuaries.

Mortefontaine (French pronunciation: [mɔʁt(ə)fɔ̃tɛn]) is a commune in the Aisne department in Hauts-de-France in Northern France.

== Population ==
Historical population
| Year | Pop. | ±% p.a. |
|---|---|---|
| 1968 | 293 | — |
| 1975 | 226 | −3.64% |
| 1982 | 236 | +0.62% |
| 1990 | 250 | +0.72% |
| 1999 | 253 | +0.13% |
| 2007 | 244 | −0.45% |
| 2012 | 244 | +0.00% |
| 2017 | 233 | −0.92% |
| 2023 | 208 | −1.87% |
Source: INSEE

== See also ==
- Communes of the Aisne department
