= Laversine =

- Commune
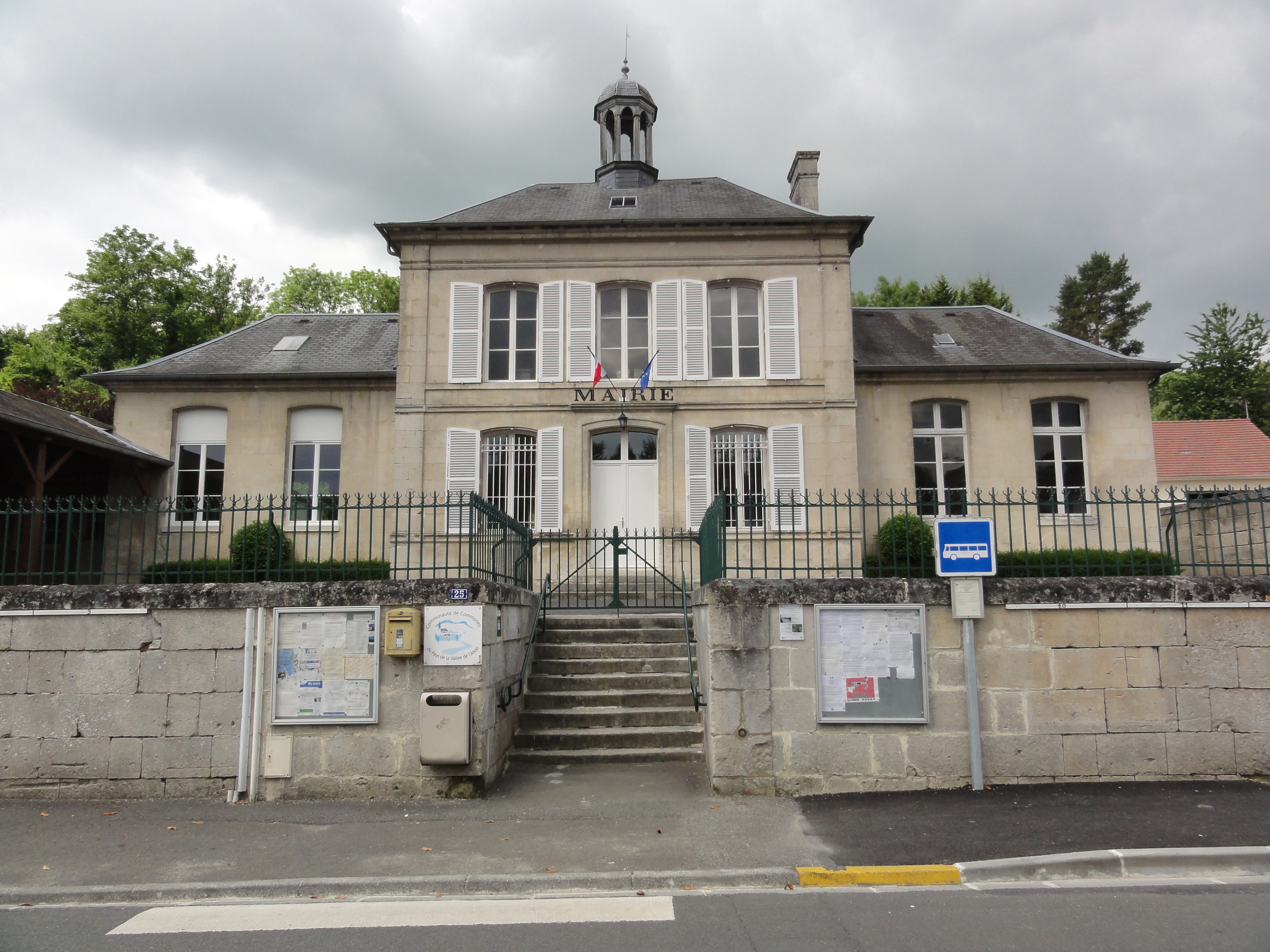
- The town hall of Laversine

- Coat of arms
- Location of Laversine
- Location within France Location within Hauts-de-France
- Coordinates: 49°21′07″N 3°10′15″E
- Country: France
- Region: Hauts-de-France
- Department: Aisne
- Arrondissement: Soissons
- Canton: Vic-sur-Aisne

Government
  - Mayor (2026–32): Aline Destri
- Area^{1}: 7.22 km^{2} (2.79 sq mi)
- Elevation: 60 m (200 ft)
- Highest elevation: 161 m (528 ft)
- Lowest elevation: 54 m (177 ft)
- Population (2023): 155
  - Density: 21.5/km^{2} (55.6/sq mi)
- Time zone: UTC+01:00 (CET)
  - Summer (DST): UTC+02:00 (CEST)
- INSEE/Postal code: 02415 /02600
- ^{1} French Land Register data, which excludes lakes, ponds, glaciers > 1 km^{2} (0.386 sq mi or 247 acres) and river estuaries.

Laversine (French pronunciation: [lavɛʁsin]) is a commune in the Aisne department and Hauts-de-France region of northern France.

== Population ==
Historical population
Year	Pop.	±% p.a.
1968	83	—
1975	84	+0.17%
1982	69	−2.77%
1990	84	+2.49%
1999	99	+1.84%
2007	136	+4.05%
2012	165	+3.94%
2017	159	−0.74%
2023	155	−0.42%
Source: INSEE

== See also ==
- Communes of the Aisne department
