= Nouvron-Vingré =

- Commune
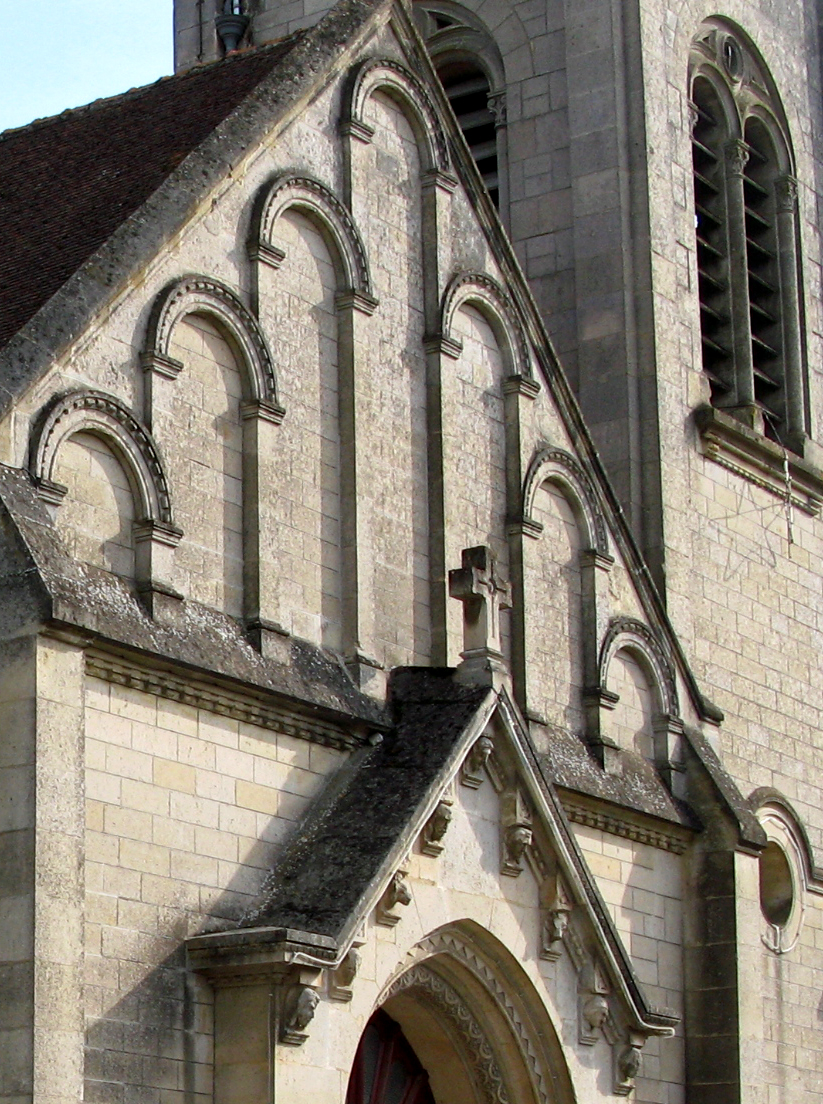
- The front of the church of Nouvron-Vingré
- Location of Nouvron-Vingré
- Location within France Location within Hauts-de-France
- Coordinates: 49°25′48″N 3°11′57″E
- Country: France
- Region: Hauts-de-France
- Department: Aisne
- Arrondissement: Soissons
- Canton: Vic-sur-Aisne

Government
  - Mayor (2026–32): Pascale Lagarde
- Area^{1}: 9.25 km^{2} (3.57 sq mi)
- Elevation: 148 m (486 ft)
- Highest elevation: 149 m (489 ft)
- Lowest elevation: 52 m (171 ft)
- Population (2023): 202
  - Density: 21.8/km^{2} (56.6/sq mi)
- Time zone: UTC+01:00 (CET)
  - Summer (DST): UTC+02:00 (CEST)
- INSEE/Postal code: 02562 /02290
- ^{1} French Land Register data, which excludes lakes, ponds, glaciers > 1 km^{2} (0.386 sq mi or 247 acres) and river estuaries.

Nouvron-Vingré (French pronunciation: [nuvʁɔ̃ vɛ̃ɡʁe]) is a commune in the Aisne department in Hauts-de-France in northern France.

== Population ==
Historical population
Year	Pop.	±% p.a.
1968	221	—
1975	200	−1.42%
1982	200	+0.00%
1990	193	−0.44%
1999	200	+0.40%
2007	214	+0.85%
2012	229	+1.36%
2017	225	−0.35%
2023	202	−1.78%
Source: INSEE

== See also ==
- Communes of the Aisne department
