= Saint-Bandry =

- Commune
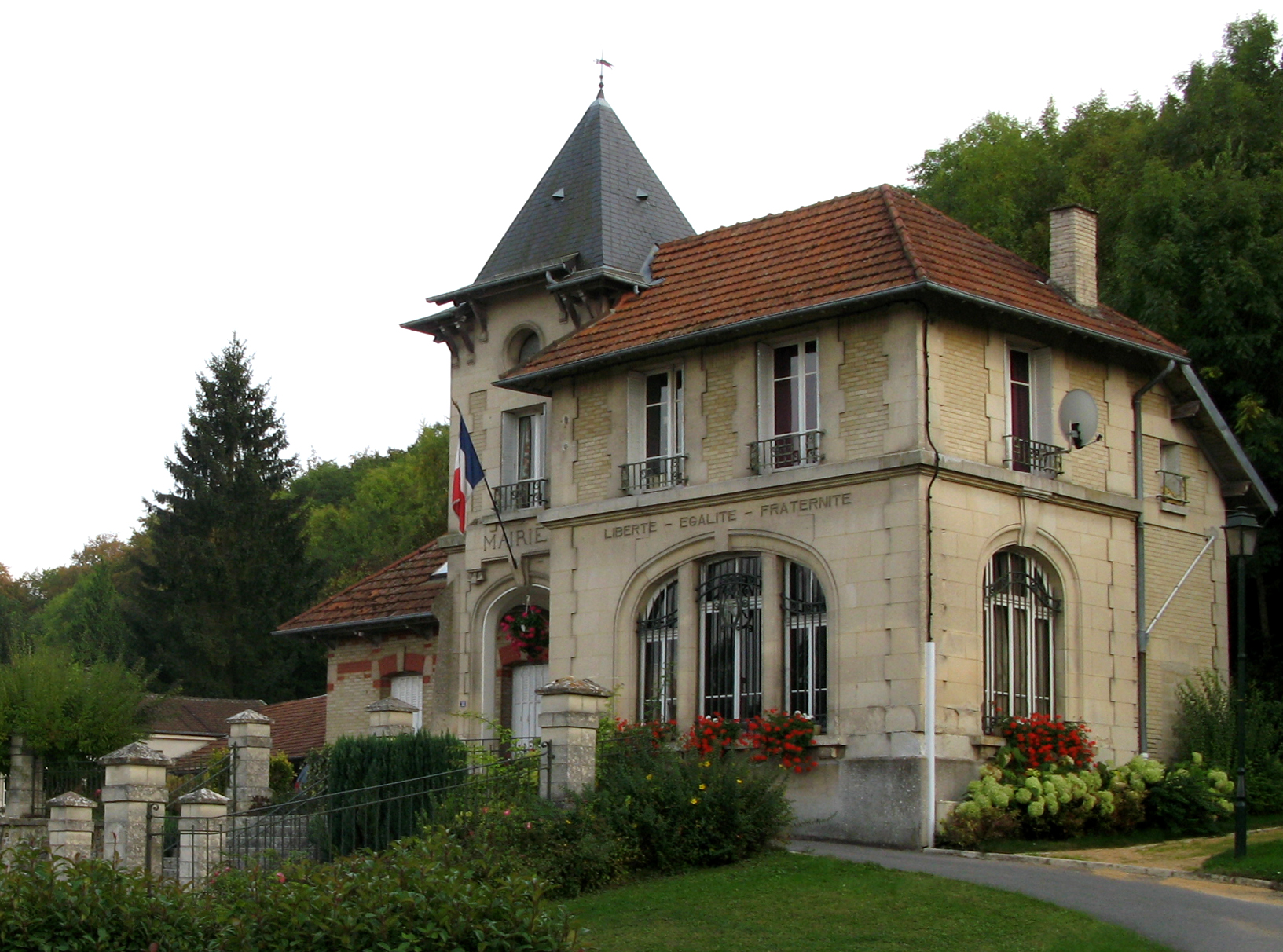
- Town hall
- Location of Saint-Bandry
- Location within France Location within Hauts-de-France
- Coordinates: 49°22′21″N 3°10′04″E
- Country: France
- Region: Hauts-de-France
- Department: Aisne
- Arrondissement: Soissons
- Canton: Vic-sur-Aisne

Government
  - Mayor (2026–32): Jean-Yves Seznec
- Area^{1}: 6.02 km^{2} (2.32 sq mi)
- Elevation: 100 m (330 ft)
- Highest elevation: 157 m (515 ft)
- Lowest elevation: 49 m (161 ft)
- Population (2023): 234
  - Density: 38.9/km^{2} (101/sq mi)
- Time zone: UTC+01:00 (CET)
  - Summer (DST): UTC+02:00 (CEST)
- INSEE/Postal code: 02672 /02290
- ^{1} French Land Register data, which excludes lakes, ponds, glaciers > 1 km^{2} (0.386 sq mi or 247 acres) and river estuaries.

Saint-Bandry (French pronunciation: [sɛ̃ bɑ̃dʁi]) is a commune in the Aisne department in Hauts-de-France in northern France.

== Population ==
Historical population
Year	Pop.	±% p.a.
1968	221	—
1975	214	−0.46%
1982	200	−0.96%
1990	202	+0.12%
1999	238	+1.84%
2007	227	−0.59%
2012	296	+5.45%
2017	267	−2.04%
2023	234	−2.17%
Source: INSEE

== See also ==
- Communes of the Aisne department
