= Pernant =

- Commune
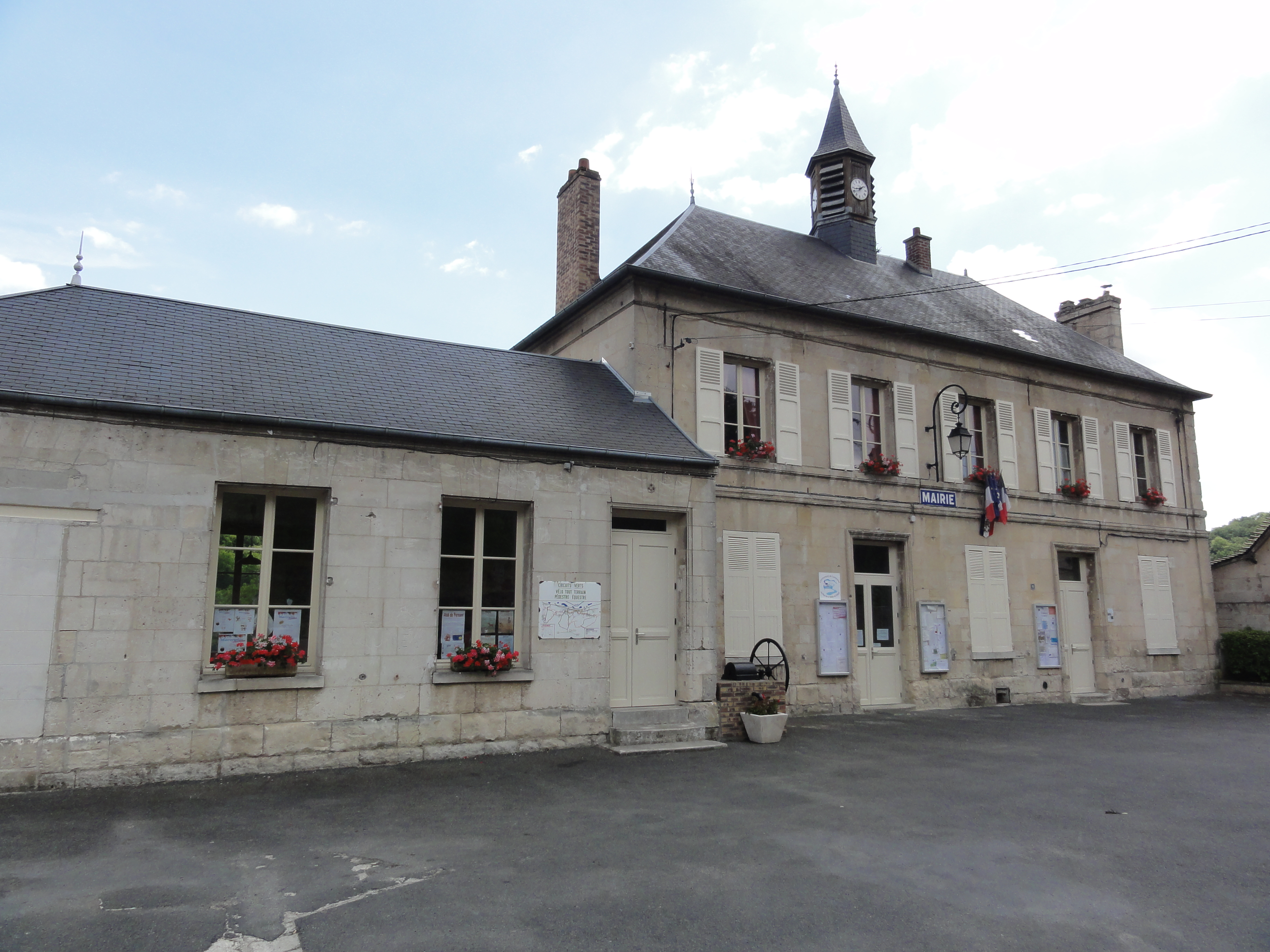
- The town hall of Pernant
- Location of Pernant
- Location within France Location within Hauts-de-France
- Coordinates: 49°22′43″N 3°14′13″E
- Country: France
- Region: Hauts-de-France
- Department: Aisne
- Arrondissement: Soissons
- Canton: Vic-sur-Aisne

Government
  - Mayor (2026–32): Christophe Padieu
- Area^{1}: 9.83 km^{2} (3.80 sq mi)
- Elevation: 42 m (138 ft)
- Highest elevation: 151 m (495 ft)
- Lowest elevation: 37 m (121 ft)
- Population (2023): 682
  - Density: 69.4/km^{2} (180/sq mi)
- Time zone: UTC+01:00 (CET)
  - Summer (DST): UTC+02:00 (CEST)
- INSEE/Postal code: 02598 /02200
- ^{1} French Land Register data, which excludes lakes, ponds, glaciers > 1 km^{2} (0.386 sq mi or 247 acres) and river estuaries.

Pernant (French pronunciation: [pɛʁnɑ̃]) is a commune in the Aisne department in Hauts-de-France in northern France.

== Population ==
Historical population
Year	Pop.	±% p.a.
1968	345	—
1975	446	+3.74%
1982	529	+2.47%
1990	621	+2.02%
1999	646	+0.44%
2007	692	+0.86%
2012	703	+0.32%
2017	650	−1.56%
2023	682	+0.80%
Source: INSEE

== See also ==
- Communes of the Aisne department
