= Bieuxy =

- Commune
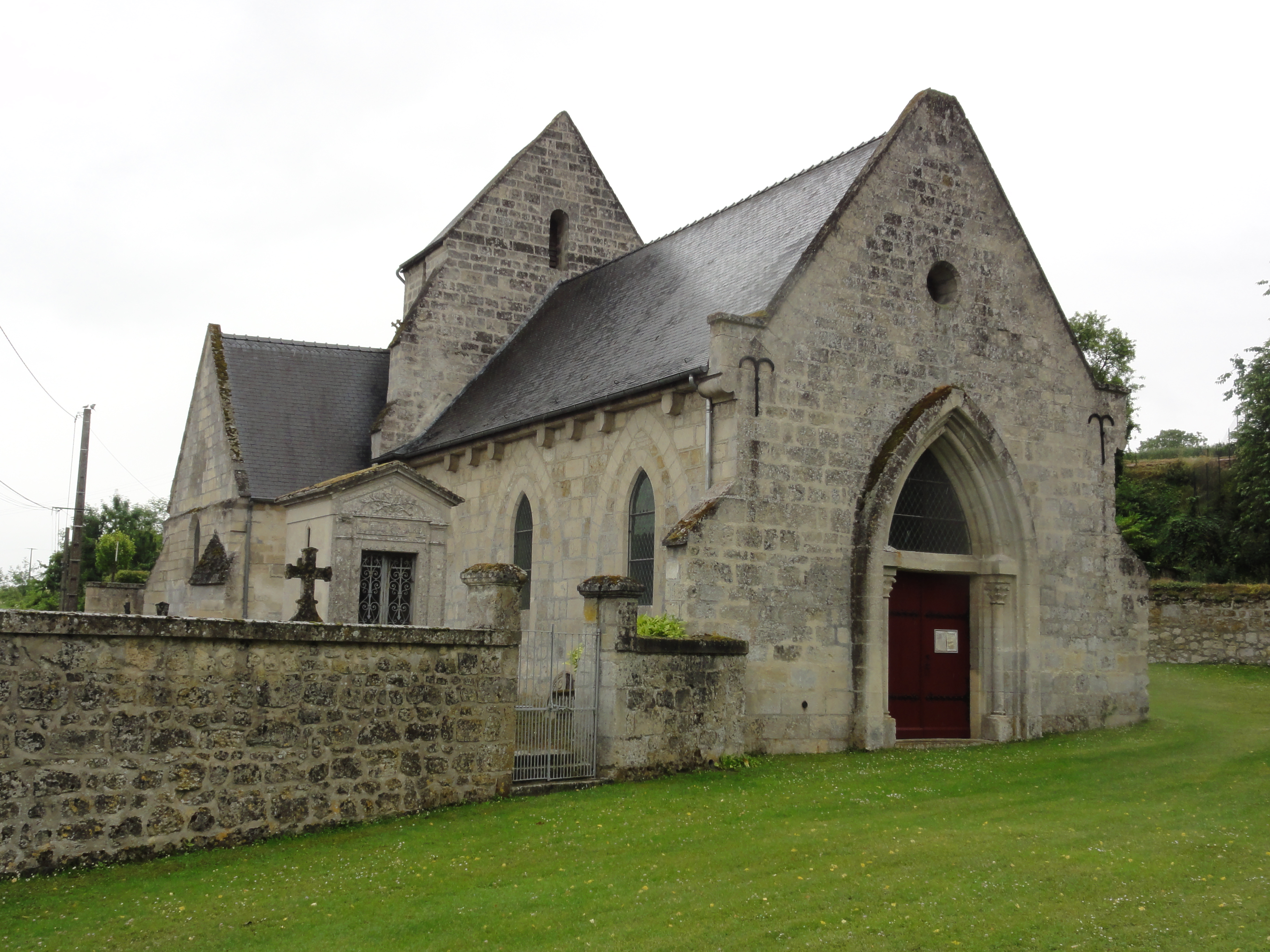
- The church of Bieuxy
- Location of Bieuxy
- Location within France Location within Hauts-de-France
- Coordinates: 49°26′50″N 3°15′43″E
- Country: France
- Region: Hauts-de-France
- Department: Aisne
- Arrondissement: Soissons
- Canton: Vic-sur-Aisne
- Intercommunality: Retz en Valois

Government
  - Mayor (2026–32): Isabelle Dournel
- Area^{1}: 4.5 km^{2} (1.7 sq mi)
- Elevation: 137 m (449 ft)
- Highest elevation: 158 m (518 ft)
- Lowest elevation: 69 m (226 ft)
- Population (2023): 31
  - Density: 6.9/km^{2} (18/sq mi)
- Time zone: UTC+01:00 (CET)
  - Summer (DST): UTC+02:00 (CEST)
- INSEE/Postal code: 02087 /02290
- ^{1} French Land Register data, which excludes lakes, ponds, glaciers > 1 km^{2} (0.386 sq mi or 247 acres) and river estuaries.

Bieuxy (French pronunciation: [bjœksi]) is a commune in the department of Aisne in Hauts-de-France in northern France.

== Population ==
Historical population
Year	Pop.	±% p.a.
1968	28	—
1975	22	−3.39%
1982	26	+2.42%
1990	21	−2.63%
1999	25	+1.96%
2007	26	+0.49%
2012	30	+2.90%
2017	30	+0.00%
2023	31	+0.55%
Source: INSEE

== See also ==
- Communes of the Aisne department
