= Épagny, Aisne =

Épagny
- Commune
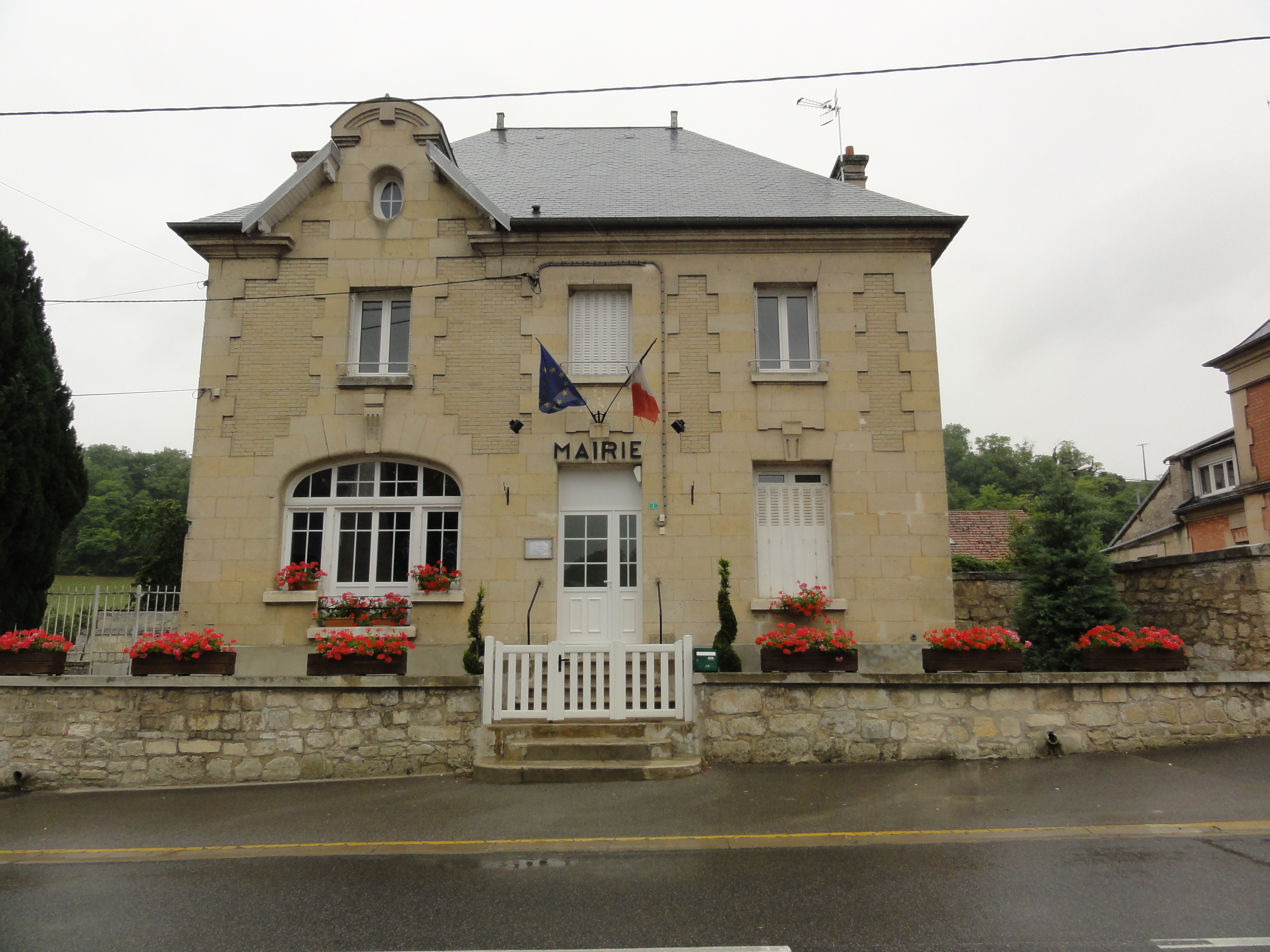
- The town hall of Épagny
- Location of Épagny
- Location within France Location within Hauts-de-France
- Coordinates: 49°27′46″N 3°14′33″E
- Country: France
- Region: Hauts-de-France
- Department: Aisne
- Arrondissement: Soissons
- Canton: Vic-sur-Aisne

Government
  - Mayor (2026–32): Guillaume Allart
- Area^{1}: 11 km^{2} (4.2 sq mi)
- Elevation: 50 m (160 ft)
- Highest elevation: 157 m (515 ft)
- Lowest elevation: 65 m (213 ft)
- Population (2023): 337
  - Density: 31/km^{2} (79/sq mi)
- Time zone: UTC+01:00 (CET)
  - Summer (DST): UTC+02:00 (CEST)
- INSEE/Postal code: 02277 /02290
- ^{1} French Land Register data, which excludes lakes, ponds, glaciers > 1 km^{2} (0.386 sq mi or 247 acres) and river estuaries.

Épagny (French pronunciation: [epaɲi]) is a commune in the Aisne department in Hauts-de-France in northern France.

== Population ==
Historical population
| Year | Pop. | ±% p.a. |
|---|---|---|
| 1968 | 253 | — |
| 1975 | 230 | −1.35% |
| 1982 | 269 | +2.26% |
| 1990 | 339 | +2.93% |
| 1999 | 333 | −0.20% |
| 2007 | 327 | −0.23% |
| 2012 | 332 | +0.30% |
| 2017 | 340 | +0.48% |
| 2023 | 337 | −0.15% |
Source: INSEE

== See also ==
- Communes of the Aisne department
