= Saint-Christophe-à-Berry =

- Commune
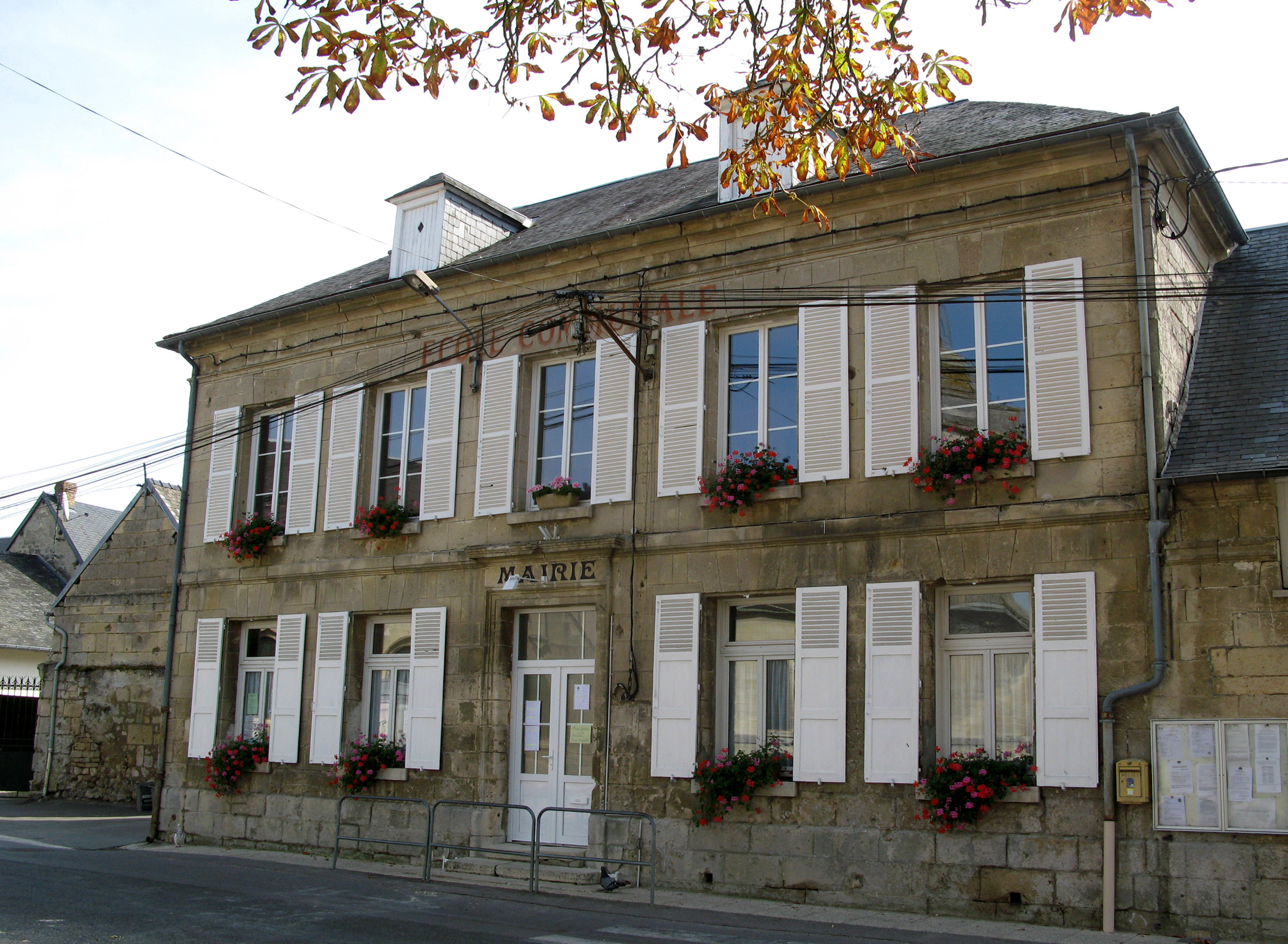
- Town hall
- Location of Saint-Christophe-à-Berry
- Location within France Location within Hauts-de-France
- Coordinates: 49°25′26″N 3°08′02″E
- Country: France
- Region: Hauts-de-France
- Department: Aisne
- Arrondissement: Soissons
- Canton: Vic-sur-Aisne

Government
  - Mayor (2026–32): Romuald Dauchelle
- Area^{1}: 7.78 km^{2} (3.00 sq mi)
- Elevation: 45 m (148 ft)
- Highest elevation: 153 m (502 ft)
- Lowest elevation: 43 m (141 ft)
- Population (2023): 441
  - Density: 56.7/km^{2} (147/sq mi)
- Time zone: UTC+01:00 (CET)
  - Summer (DST): UTC+02:00 (CEST)
- INSEE/Postal code: 02673 /02290
- ^{1} French Land Register data, which excludes lakes, ponds, glaciers > 1 km^{2} (0.386 sq mi or 247 acres) and river estuaries.

Saint-Christophe-à-Berry (French pronunciation: [sɛ̃ kʁistɔf a beʁi]) is a commune in the Aisne department in Hauts-de-France in northern France.

== Population ==
Historical population
Year	Pop.	±% p.a.
1968	350	—
1975	349	−0.04%
1982	335	−0.58%
1990	340	+0.19%
1999	347	+0.23%
2007	420	+2.42%
2012	429	+0.42%
2017	447	+0.83%
2023	441	−0.22%
Source: INSEE

== See also ==
- Communes of the Aisne department
