= Vézaponin =

- Commune
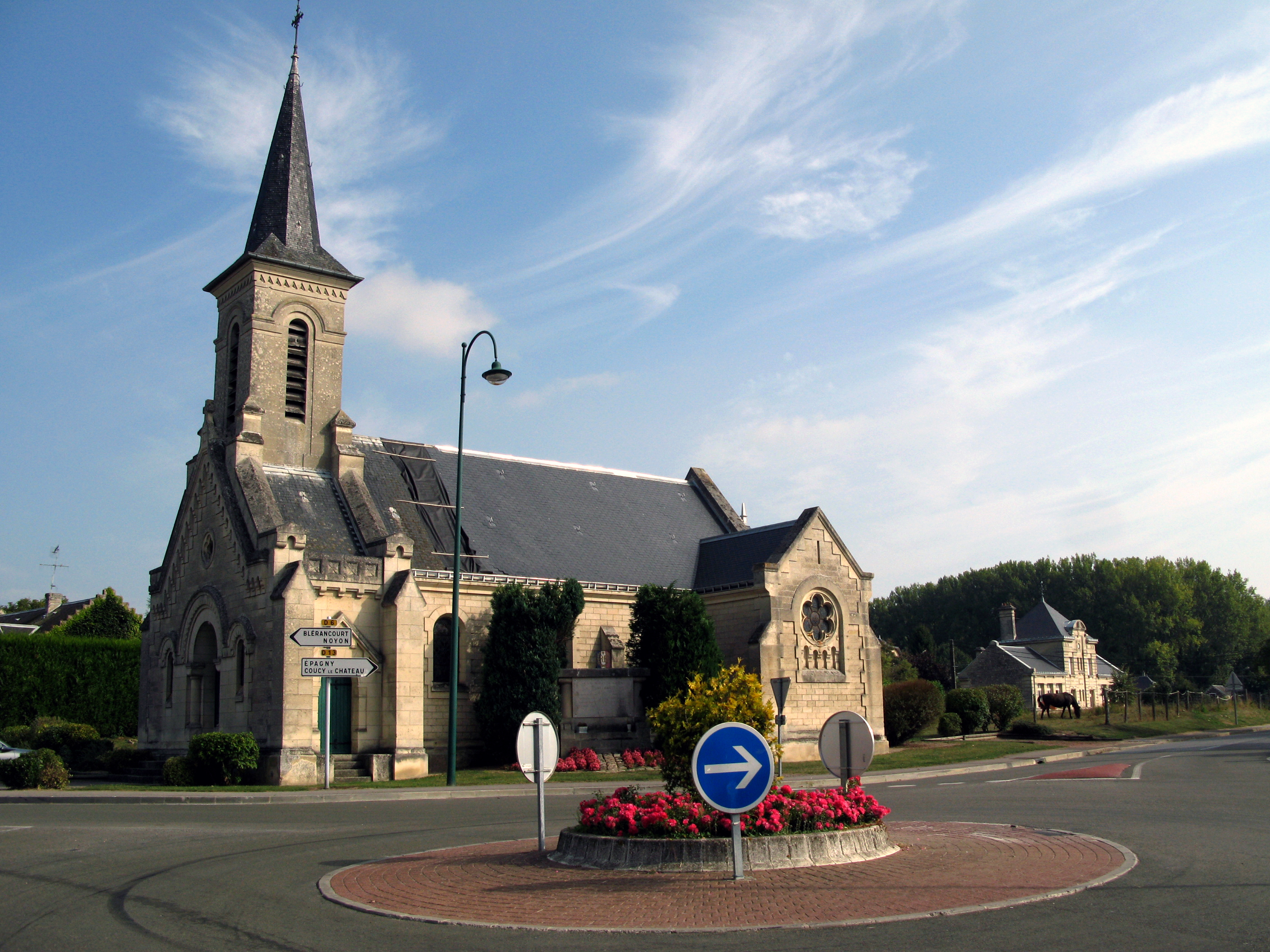
- The church of Vézaponin
- Location of Vézaponin
- Location within France Location within Hauts-de-France
- Coordinates: 49°27′32″N 3°13′49″E
- Country: France
- Region: Hauts-de-France
- Department: Aisne
- Arrondissement: Soissons
- Canton: Vic-sur-Aisne
- Intercommunality: Retz en Valois

Government
  - Mayor (2026–32): Evelyne Pottier
- Area^{1}: 3.18 km^{2} (1.23 sq mi)
- Elevation: 55 m (180 ft)
- Highest elevation: 156 m (512 ft)
- Lowest elevation: 63 m (207 ft)
- Population (2023): 113
  - Density: 35.5/km^{2} (92.0/sq mi)
- Time zone: UTC+01:00 (CET)
  - Summer (DST): UTC+02:00 (CEST)
- INSEE/Postal code: 02793 /02290
- ^{1} French Land Register data, which excludes lakes, ponds, glaciers > 1 km^{2} (0.386 sq mi or 247 acres) and river estuaries.

Vézaponin (French pronunciation: [vezapɔnɛ̃]) is a commune in the Aisne department in Hauts-de-France in northern France.

== Population ==
Historical population
Year	Pop.	±% p.a.
1968	121	—
1975	109	−1.48%
1982	110	+0.13%
1990	117	+0.77%
1999	129	+1.09%
2007	123	−0.59%
2012	132	+1.42%
2017	125	−1.08%
2023	113	−1.67%
Source: INSEE

== See also ==
- Communes of the Aisne department
