= Tartiers =

- Commune
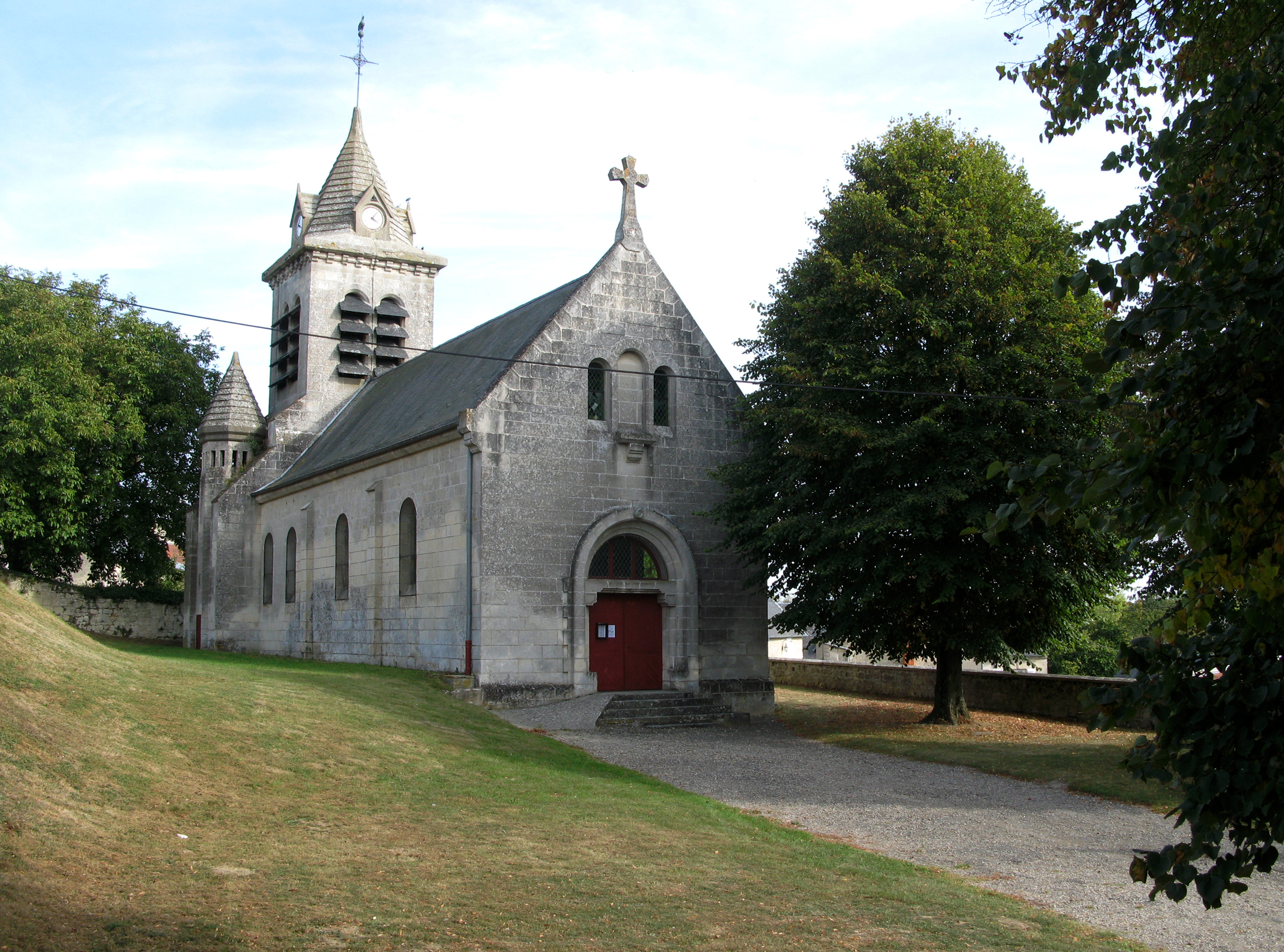
- The church of Tartiers

- Coat of arms
- Location of Tartiers
- Location within France Location within Hauts-de-France
- Coordinates: 49°26′02″N 3°14′23″E
- Country: France
- Region: Hauts-de-France
- Department: Aisne
- Arrondissement: Soissons
- Canton: Vic-sur-Aisne

Government
  - Mayor (2026–32): Jérôme Philipon
- Area^{1}: 8.89 km^{2} (3.43 sq mi)
- Elevation: 130 m (430 ft)
- Highest elevation: 149 m (489 ft)
- Lowest elevation: 54 m (177 ft)
- Population (2023): 162
  - Density: 18.2/km^{2} (47.2/sq mi)
- Time zone: UTC+01:00 (CET)
  - Summer (DST): UTC+02:00 (CEST)
- INSEE/Postal code: 02736 /02290
- ^{1} French Land Register data, which excludes lakes, ponds, glaciers > 1 km^{2} (0.386 sq mi or 247 acres) and river estuaries.

Tartiers (French pronunciation: [taʁtje]) is a commune in the Aisne department in Hauts-de-France in northern France.

== Population ==
Historical population
Year	Pop.	±% p.a.
1968	208	—
1975	205	−0.21%
1982	195	−0.71%
1990	180	−1.00%
1999	168	−0.76%
2007	174	+0.44%
2012	185	+1.23%
2017	166	−2.14%
2023	162	−0.41%
Source: INSEE

== See also ==
- Communes of the Aisne department
