= Cutry, Aisne =

Cutry
- Commune
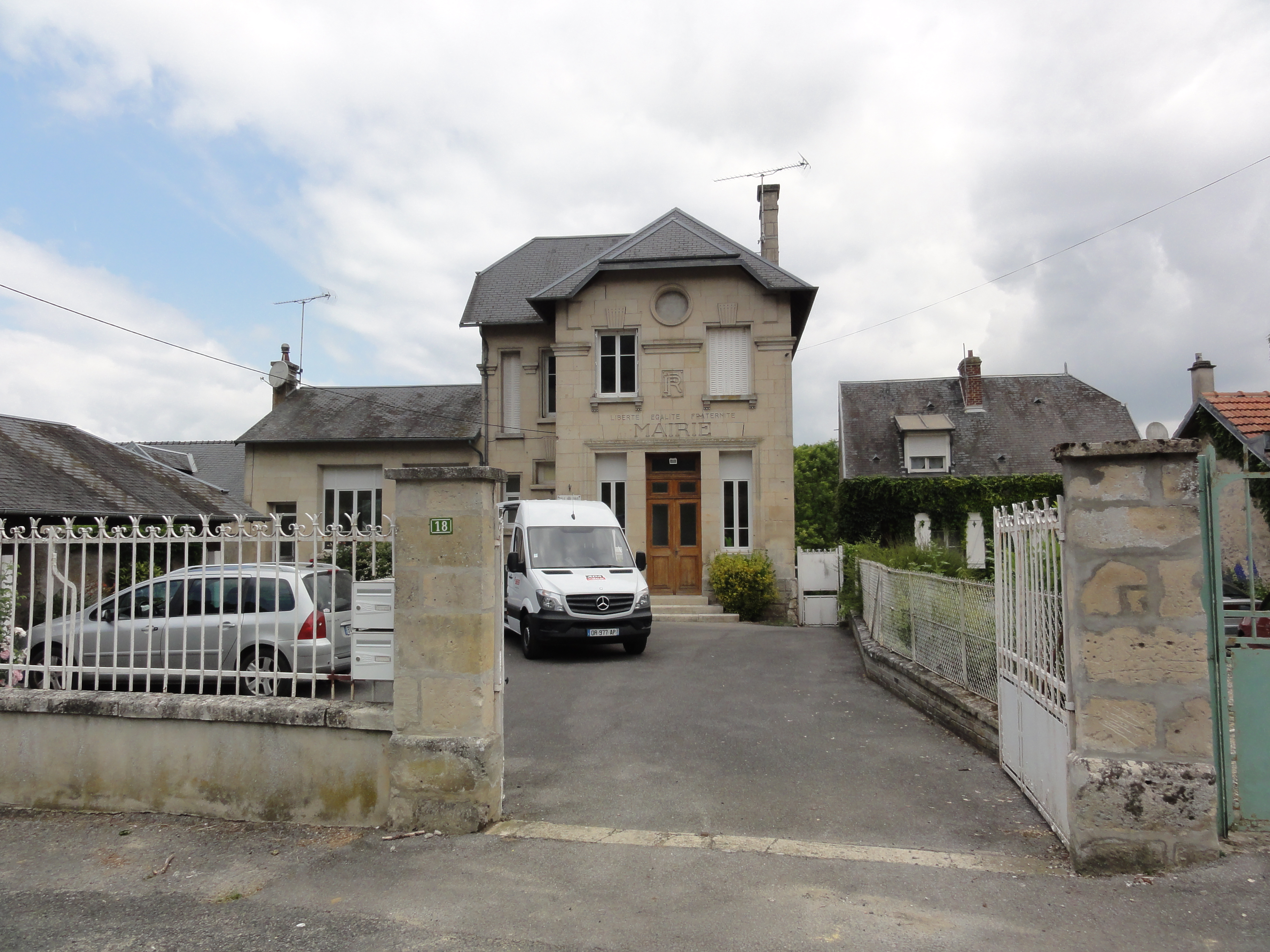
- The town hall of Cutry
- Location of Cutry
- Location within France Location within Hauts-de-France
- Coordinates: 49°20′52″N 3°10′57″E
- Country: France
- Region: Hauts-de-France
- Department: Aisne
- Arrondissement: Soissons
- Canton: Vic-sur-Aisne
- Intercommunality: Retz en Valois

Government
  - Mayor (2026–32): Benoît Letrillart
- Area^{1}: 4.79 km^{2} (1.85 sq mi)
- Elevation: 127 m (417 ft)
- Highest elevation: 158 m (518 ft)
- Lowest elevation: 58 m (190 ft)
- Population (2023): 126
  - Density: 26.3/km^{2} (68.1/sq mi)
- Time zone: UTC+01:00 (CET)
  - Summer (DST): UTC+02:00 (CEST)
- INSEE/Postal code: 02254 /02600
- ^{1} French Land Register data, which excludes lakes, ponds, glaciers > 1 km^{2} (0.386 sq mi or 247 acres) and river estuaries.

Cutry (French pronunciation: [kytʁi]) is a commune in the Aisne department in Hauts-de-France in northern France.

== Population ==
Historical population
Year	Pop.	±% p.a.
1968	101	—
1975	77	−3.80%
1982	90	+2.25%
1990	88	−0.28%
1999	98	+1.20%
2007	112	+1.68%
2012	122	+1.73%
2017	128	+0.96%
2023	126	−0.26%
Source: INSEE

== See also ==
- Communes of the Aisne department
