= Jumencourt =

- Commune
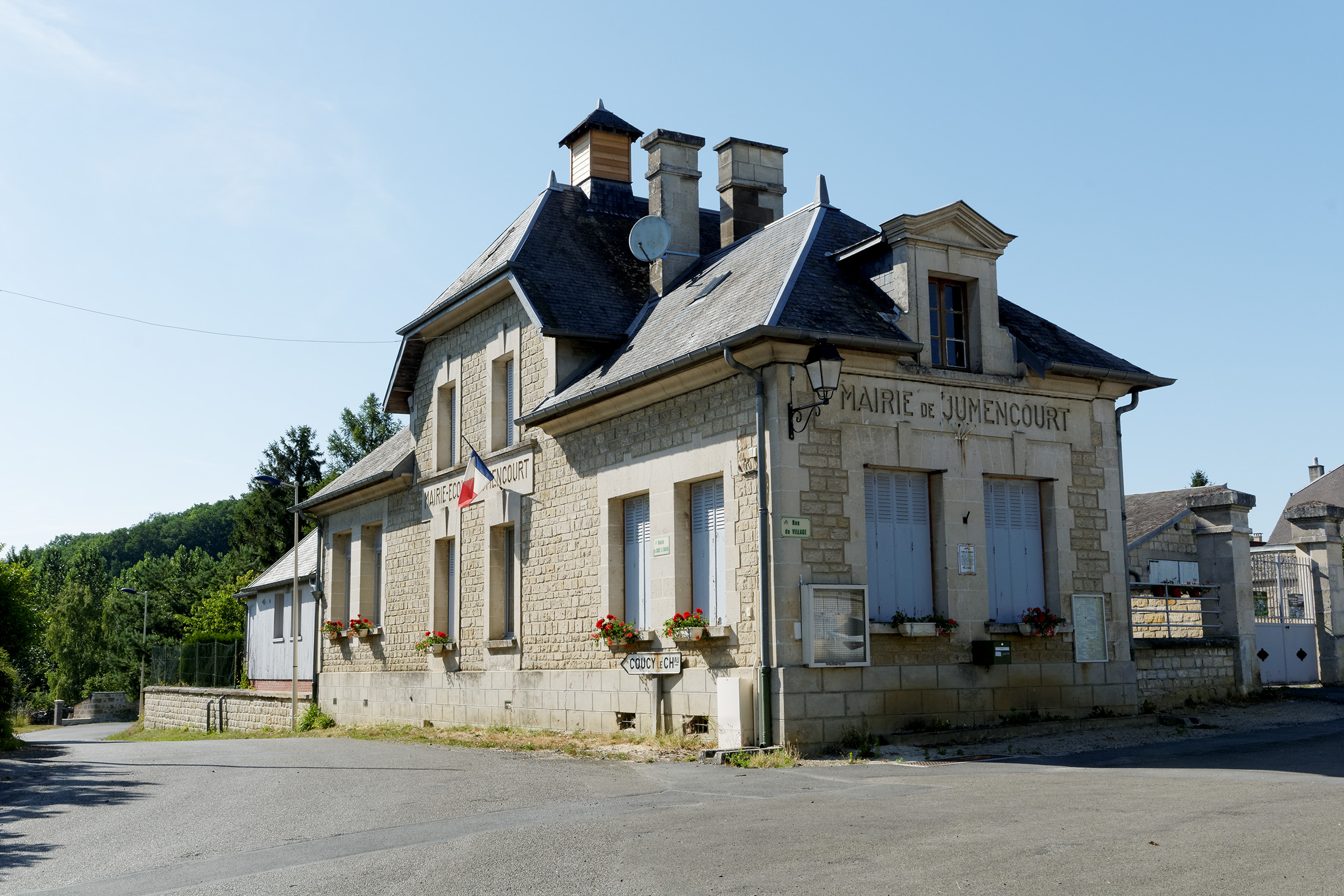
- The town hall and school of Jumencourt

- Coat of arms
- Location of Jumencourt
- Location within France Location within Hauts-de-France
- Coordinates: 49°30′34″N 3°21′17″E
- Country: France
- Region: Hauts-de-France
- Department: Aisne
- Arrondissement: Laon
- Canton: Vic-sur-Aisne
- Intercommunality: Picardie des Châteaux

Government
  - Mayor (2026–32): Rodrigue Marouzé
- Area^{1}: 6.2 km^{2} (2.4 sq mi)
- Elevation: 68 m (223 ft)
- Highest elevation: 168 m (551 ft)
- Lowest elevation: 51 m (167 ft)
- Population (2023): 120
  - Density: 19/km^{2} (50/sq mi)
- Time zone: UTC+01:00 (CET)
  - Summer (DST): UTC+02:00 (CEST)
- INSEE/Postal code: 02395 /02380
- ^{1} French Land Register data, which excludes lakes, ponds, glaciers > 1 km^{2} (0.386 sq mi or 247 acres) and river estuaries.

Jumencourt (French pronunciation: [ʒymɑ̃kuʁ]) is a commune in the Aisne department in Hauts-de-France in northern France.

== Geography ==
The river Ailette forms all of the commune's southern border.

== Population ==
Historical population
Year	Pop.	±% p.a.
1968	109	—
1975	98	−1.51%
1982	94	−0.59%
1990	111	+2.10%
1999	119	+0.78%
2007	153	+3.19%
2012	154	+0.13%
2017	146	−1.06%
2023	120	−3.22%
Source: INSEE

== See also ==
- Communes of the Aisne department
