= Saint-Paul-aux-Bois =

- Commune
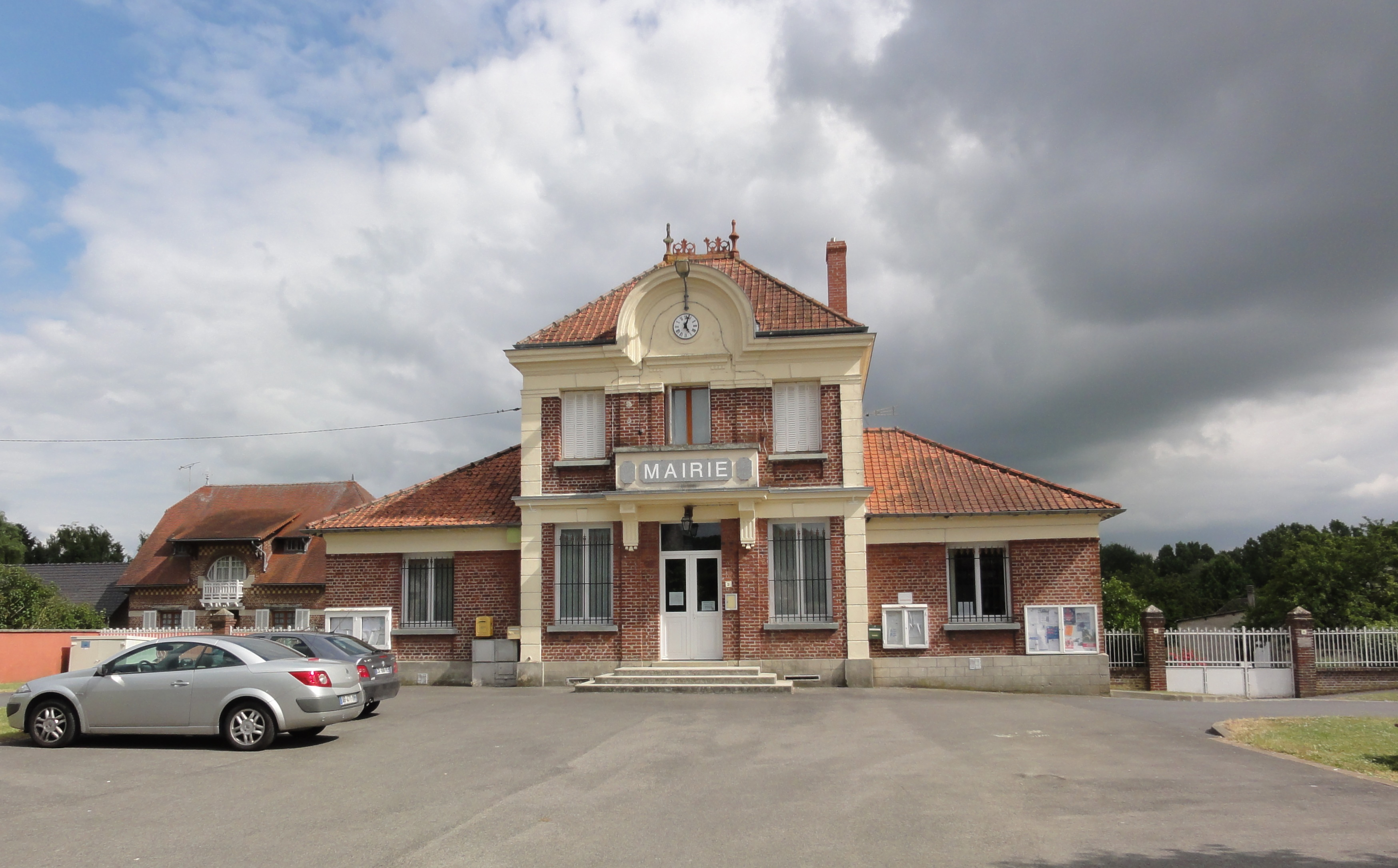
- The town hall of Saint-Paul-aux-Bois
- Location of Saint-Paul-aux-Bois
- Location within France Location within Hauts-de-France
- Coordinates: 49°31′57″N 3°12′15″E
- Country: France
- Region: Hauts-de-France
- Department: Aisne
- Arrondissement: Laon
- Canton: Vic-sur-Aisne

Government
  - Mayor (2026–32): Pascal Picard
- Area^{1}: 11.13 km^{2} (4.30 sq mi)
- Elevation: 57 m (187 ft)
- Highest elevation: 76 m (249 ft)
- Lowest elevation: 40 m (130 ft)
- Population (2023): 370
  - Density: 33/km^{2} (86/sq mi)
- Time zone: UTC+01:00 (CET)
  - Summer (DST): UTC+02:00 (CEST)
- INSEE/Postal code: 02686 /02300
- ^{1} French Land Register data, which excludes lakes, ponds, glaciers > 1 km^{2} (0.386 sq mi or 247 acres) and river estuaries.

Saint-Paul-aux-Bois (French pronunciation: [sɛ̃ pɔl o bwa]) is a commune in the Aisne department in Hauts-de-France in northern France.

== Geography ==
The river Ailette forms most of the commune's northern border.

== Population ==
Historical population
Year	Pop.	±% p.a.
1968	347	—
1975	323	−1.02%
1982	323	+0.00%
1990	385	+2.22%
1999	364	−0.62%
2007	392	+0.93%
2012	395	+0.15%
2017	389	−0.31%
2023	370	−0.83%
Source: INSEE

== See also ==
- Communes of the Aisne department
