= Besmé =

- Commune
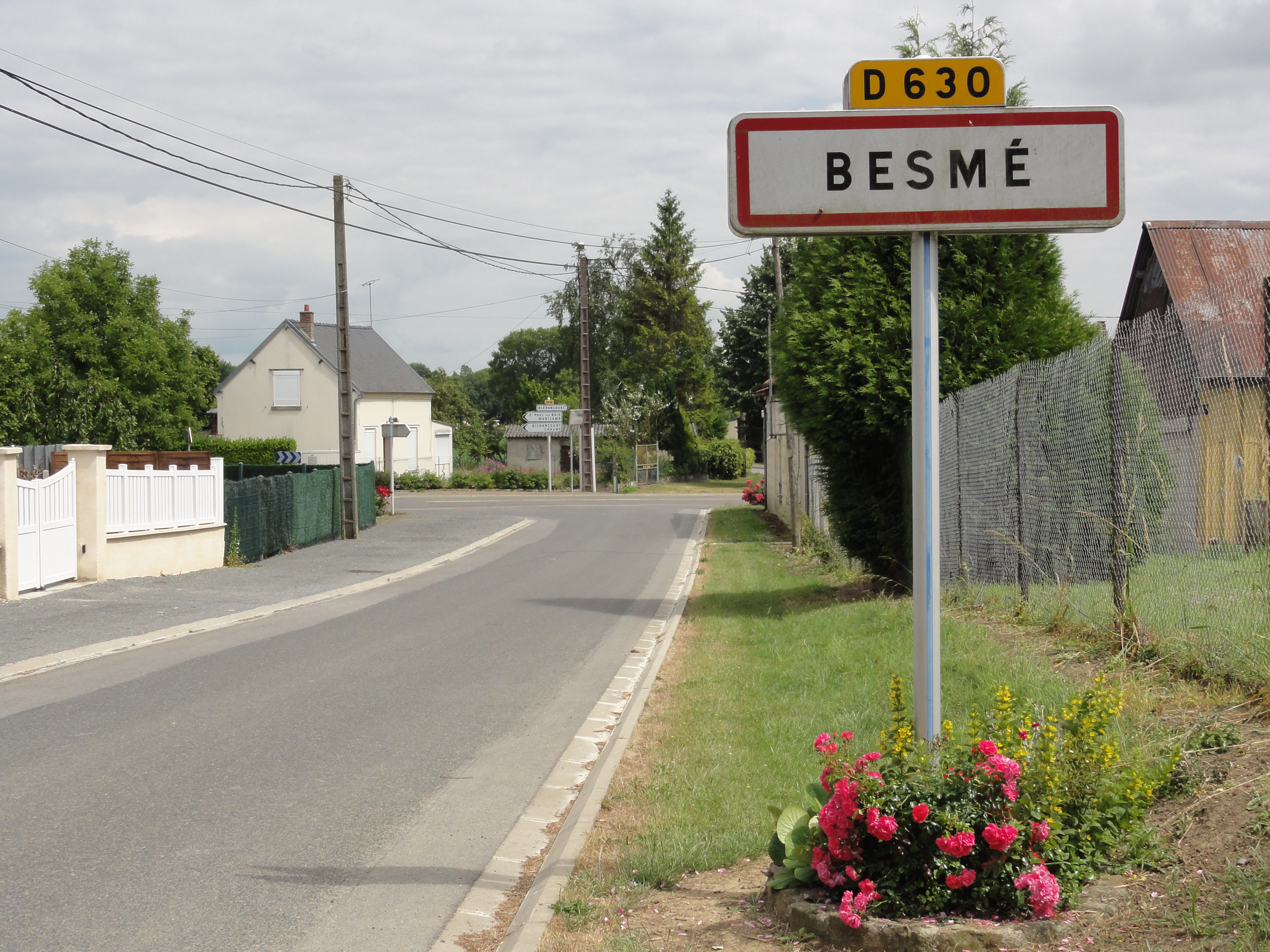
- Location of Besmé
- Location within France Location within Hauts-de-France
- Coordinates: 49°32′21″N 3°09′52″E
- Country: France
- Region: Hauts-de-France
- Department: Aisne
- Arrondissement: Laon
- Canton: Vic-sur-Aisne

Government
  - Mayor (2026–32): Georges Kress
- Area^{1}: 2.66 km^{2} (1.03 sq mi)
- Elevation: 57 m (187 ft)
- Highest elevation: 76 m (249 ft)
- Lowest elevation: 54 m (177 ft)
- Population (2023): 166
  - Density: 62.4/km^{2} (162/sq mi)
- Time zone: UTC+01:00 (CET)
  - Summer (DST): UTC+02:00 (CEST)
- INSEE/Postal code: 02078 /02300
- ^{1} French Land Register data, which excludes lakes, ponds, glaciers > 1 km^{2} (0.386 sq mi or 247 acres) and river estuaries.

Besmé (French pronunciation: [bɛme]) is a commune in the department of Aisne in Hauts-de-France in northern France.

== Population ==
Historical population
Year	Pop.	±% p.a.
1968	132	—
1975	122	−1.12%
1982	131	+1.02%
1990	136	+0.47%
1999	133	−0.25%
2007	156	+2.01%
2012	156	+0.00%
2017	160	+0.51%
2023	166	+0.62%
Source: INSEE

== See also ==
- Communes of the Aisne department
