= Quincy-Basse =

- Commune
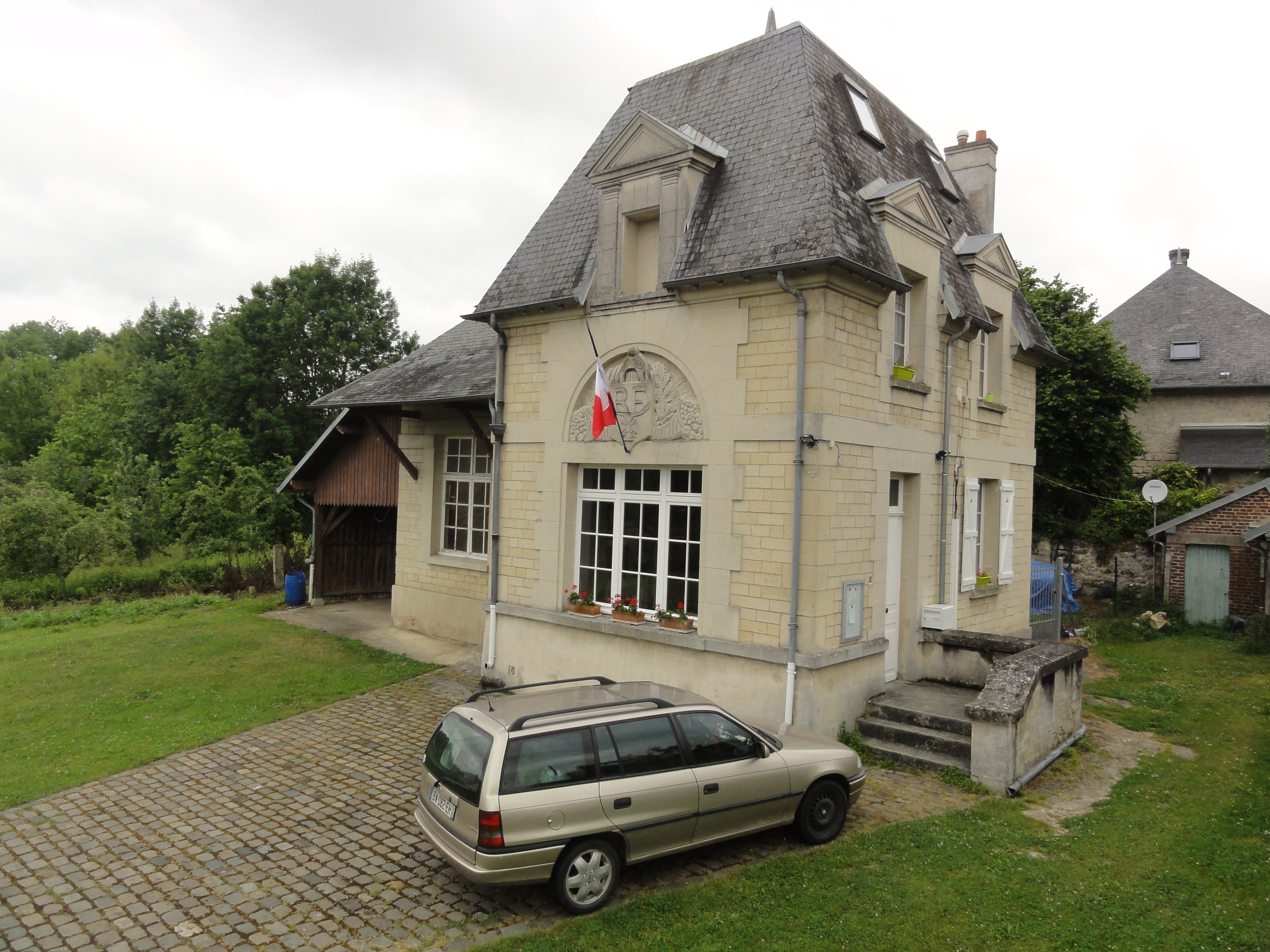
- The town hall of Quincy-Basse
- Location of Quincy-Basse
- Location within France Location within Hauts-de-France
- Coordinates: 49°30′58″N 3°22′42″E
- Country: France
- Region: Hauts-de-France
- Department: Aisne
- Arrondissement: Laon
- Canton: Vic-sur-Aisne

Government
  - Mayor (2026–32): Philippe Moussour
- Area^{1}: 3.87 km^{2} (1.49 sq mi)
- Elevation: 67 m (220 ft)
- Highest elevation: 153 m (502 ft)
- Lowest elevation: 58 m (190 ft)
- Population (2023): 53
  - Density: 14/km^{2} (35/sq mi)
- Time zone: UTC+01:00 (CET)
  - Summer (DST): UTC+02:00 (CEST)
- INSEE/Postal code: 02632 /02380
- ^{1} French Land Register data, which excludes lakes, ponds, glaciers > 1 km^{2} (0.386 sq mi or 247 acres) and river estuaries.

Quincy-Basse (French pronunciation: [kɛ̃si bas]) is a commune in the Aisne department in Hauts-de-France in northern France.

== Population ==
Historical population
Year	Pop.	±% p.a.
1968	54	—
1975	53	−0.27%
1982	59	+1.54%
1990	60	+0.21%
1999	68	+1.40%
2007	50	−3.77%
2012	60	+3.71%
2017	60	+0.00%
2023	53	−2.05%
Source: INSEE

== See also ==
- Communes of the Aisne department
