= Landricourt, Aisne =

Landricourt
- Commune
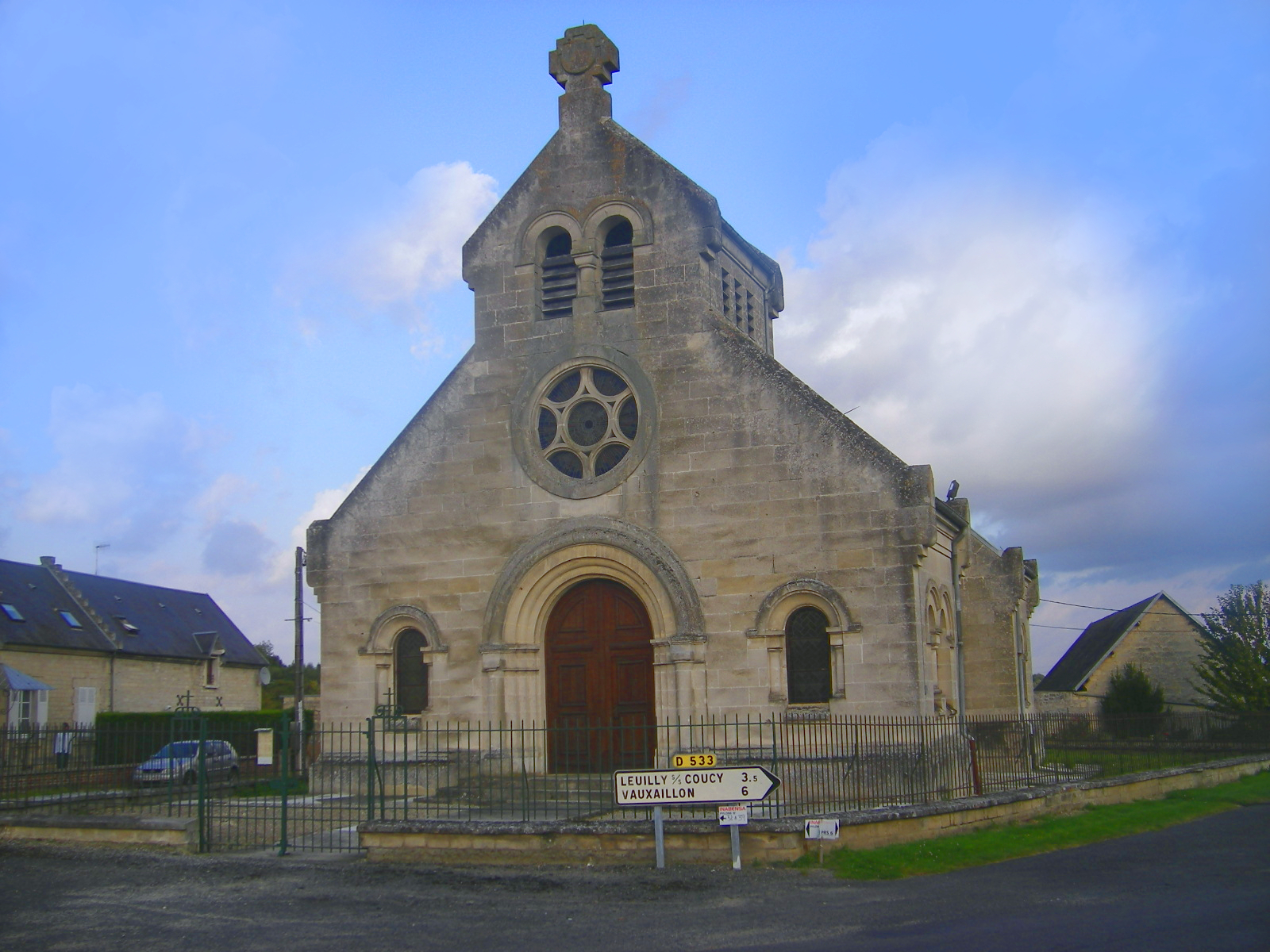
- The church of Landricourt
- Location of Landricourt
- Location within France Location within Hauts-de-France
- Coordinates: 49°30′33″N 3°22′03″E
- Country: France
- Region: Hauts-de-France
- Department: Aisne
- Arrondissement: Laon
- Canton: Vic-sur-Aisne

Government
  - Mayor (2026–32): Eddy Warnier
- Area^{1}: 5.83 km^{2} (2.25 sq mi)
- Elevation: 180 m (590 ft)
- Highest elevation: 169 m (554 ft)
- Lowest elevation: 51 m (167 ft)
- Population (2023): 126
  - Density: 21.6/km^{2} (56.0/sq mi)
- Time zone: UTC+01:00 (CET)
  - Summer (DST): UTC+02:00 (CEST)
- INSEE/Postal code: 02406 /02380
- ^{1} French Land Register data, which excludes lakes, ponds, glaciers > 1 km^{2} (0.386 sq mi or 247 acres) and river estuaries.

Landricourt (French pronunciation: [lɑ̃dʁikuʁ]) is a commune in the Aisne department in Hauts-de-France in northern France.

== Geography ==
The river Ailette forms all of the commune's southern border.

== Population ==
Historical population
Year	Pop.	±% p.a.
1968	137	—
1975	139	+0.21%
1982	108	−3.54%
1990	92	−1.98%
1999	128	+3.74%
2007	122	−0.60%
2012	131	+1.43%
2017	137	+0.90%
2023	126	−1.39%
Source: INSEE

== See also ==
- Communes of the Aisne department
