= Septvaux =

- Commune
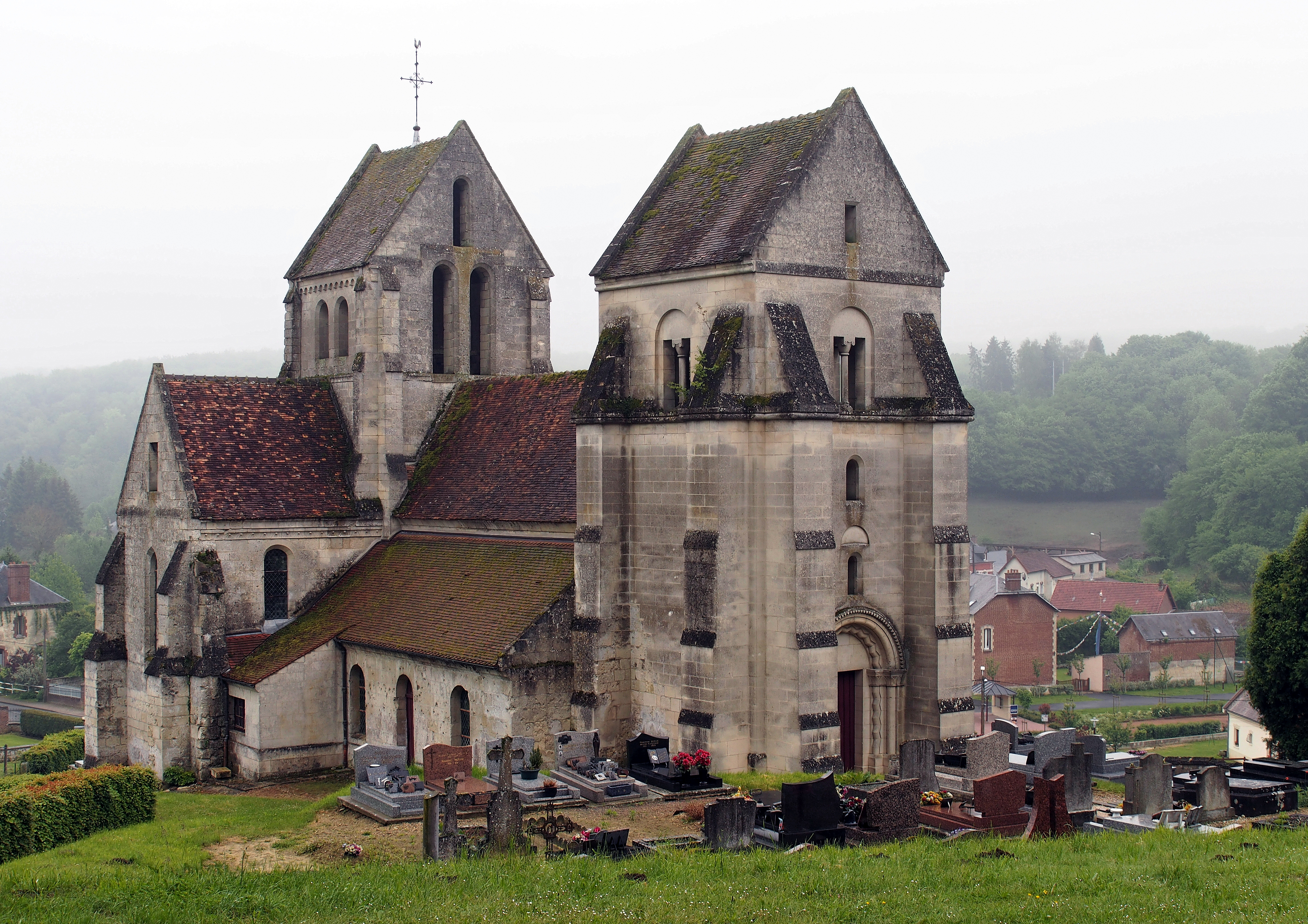
- The church of Septvaux

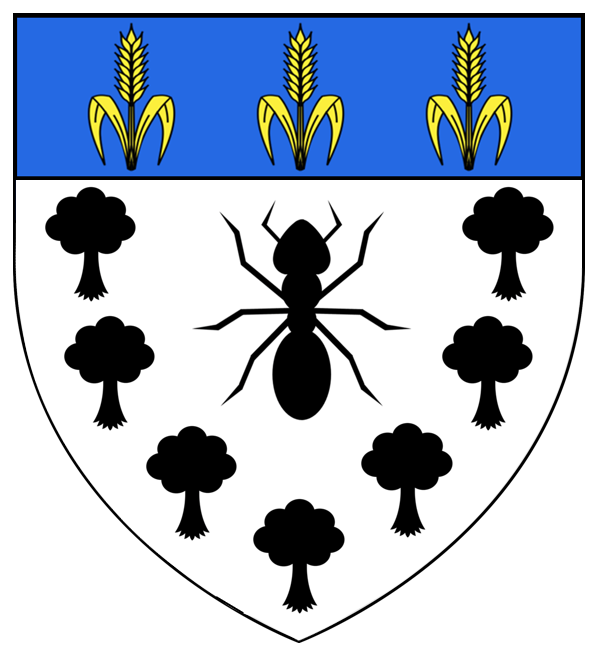
- Coat of arms
- Location of Septvaux
- Location within France Location within Hauts-de-France
- Coordinates: 49°34′16″N 3°22′46″E
- Country: France
- Region: Hauts-de-France
- Department: Aisne
- Arrondissement: Laon
- Canton: Vic-sur-Aisne

Government
  - Mayor (2026–32): Christophe Lautout
- Area^{1}: 8.56 km^{2} (3.31 sq mi)
- Elevation: 110 m (360 ft)
- Highest elevation: 212 m (696 ft)
- Lowest elevation: 93 m (305 ft)
- Population (2023): 179
  - Density: 20.9/km^{2} (54.2/sq mi)
- Time zone: UTC+01:00 (CET)
  - Summer (DST): UTC+02:00 (CEST)
- INSEE/Postal code: 02707 /02410
- ^{1} French Land Register data, which excludes lakes, ponds, glaciers > 1 km^{2} (0.386 sq mi or 247 acres) and river estuaries.

Septvaux is a commune in the Aisne department in Hauts-de-France in northern France.

== Population ==
Historical population
Year	Pop.	±% p.a.
1968	200	—
1975	213	+0.90%
1982	161	−3.92%
1990	183	+1.61%
1999	202	+1.10%
2007	204	+0.12%
2012	164	−4.27%
2017	179	+1.77%
2023	179	+0.00%
Source: INSEE

== See also ==
- Communes of the Aisne department
