= Saint-Aubin, Aisne =

Saint-Aubin
- Commune
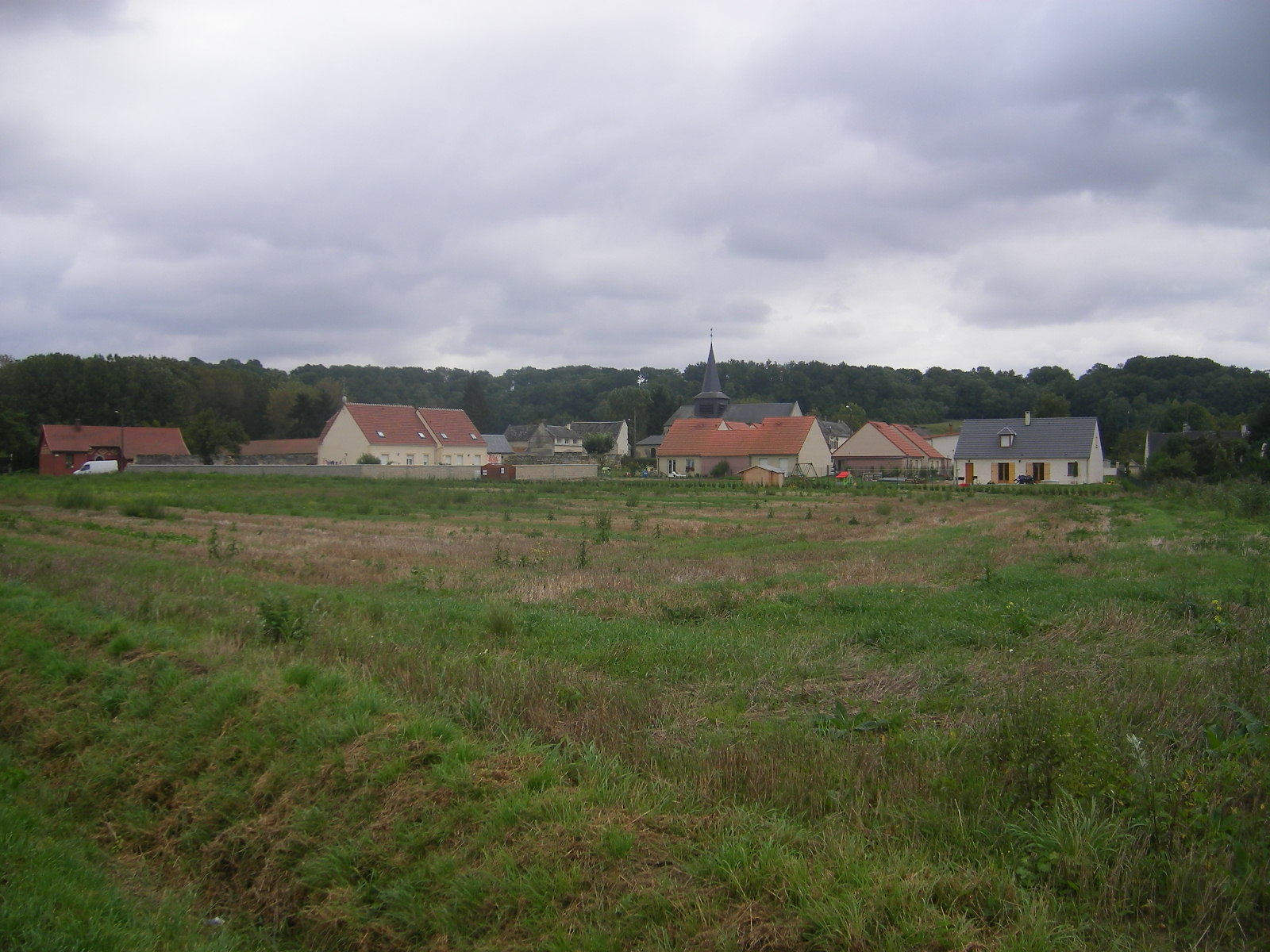
- A general view of Saint-Aubin
- Location of Saint-Aubin
- Location within France Location within Hauts-de-France
- Coordinates: 49°30′31″N 3°11′23″E
- Country: France
- Region: Hauts-de-France
- Department: Aisne
- Arrondissement: Laon
- Canton: Vic-sur-Aisne

Government
  - Mayor (2026–32): Benoît Philipon
- Area^{1}: 8.36 km^{2} (3.23 sq mi)
- Elevation: 60 m (200 ft)
- Highest elevation: 154 m (505 ft)
- Lowest elevation: 49 m (161 ft)
- Population (2023): 276
  - Density: 33.0/km^{2} (85.5/sq mi)
- Time zone: UTC+01:00 (CET)
  - Summer (DST): UTC+02:00 (CEST)
- INSEE/Postal code: 02671 /02300
- ^{1} French Land Register data, which excludes lakes, ponds, glaciers > 1 km^{2} (0.386 sq mi or 247 acres) and river estuaries.

Saint-Aubin (French pronunciation: [sɛ̃.t‿obɛ̃]) is a commune in the Aisne department and Hauts-de-France region of northern France.

== Population ==
Historical population
Year	Pop.	±% p.a.
1968	270	—
1975	248	−1.21%
1982	251	+0.17%
1990	239	−0.61%
1999	273	+1.49%
2007	317	+1.89%
2012	328	+0.68%
2017	291	−2.37%
2023	276	−0.88%
Source: INSEE

== See also ==
- Communes of the Aisne department
