= Camelin =

- Commune
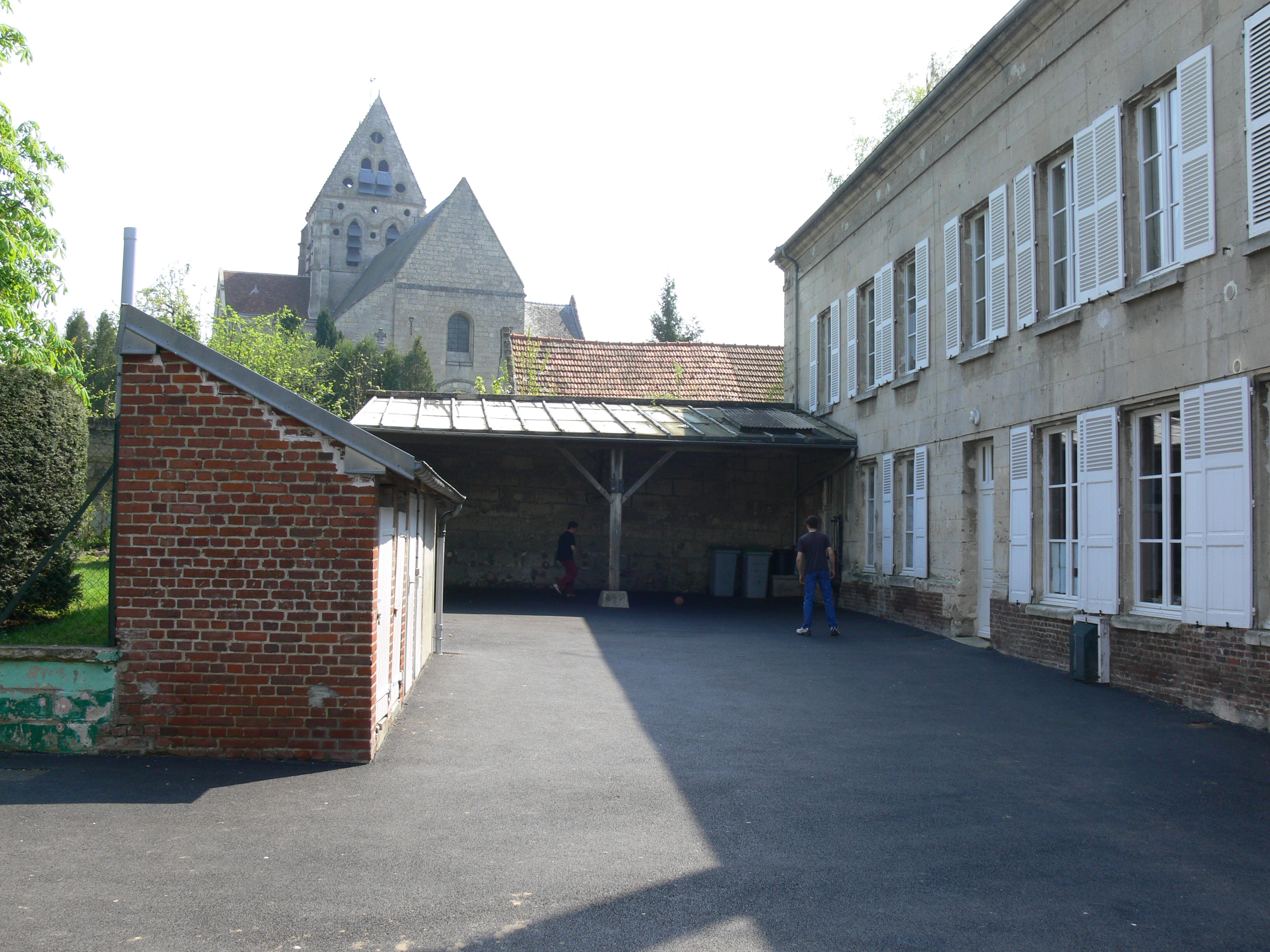
- School, with a view of the church
- Location of Camelin
- Location within France Location within Hauts-de-France
- Coordinates: 49°31′32″N 3°08′06″E
- Country: France
- Region: Hauts-de-France
- Department: Aisne
- Arrondissement: Laon
- Canton: Vic-sur-Aisne

Government
  - Mayor (2026–32): Pascal Trolard
- Area^{1}: 9.15 km^{2} (3.53 sq mi)
- Elevation: 73 m (240 ft)
- Highest elevation: 162 m (531 ft)
- Lowest elevation: 52 m (171 ft)
- Population (2023): 426
  - Density: 46.6/km^{2} (121/sq mi)
- Time zone: UTC+01:00 (CET)
  - Summer (DST): UTC+02:00 (CEST)
- INSEE/Postal code: 02140 /02300
- ^{1} French Land Register data, which excludes lakes, ponds, glaciers > 1 km^{2} (0.386 sq mi or 247 acres) and river estuaries.

Camelin (French pronunciation: [kamlɛ̃]) is a commune in the Aisne department in Hauts-de-France in northern France.

== Population ==
Historical population
Year	Pop.	±% p.a.
1968	334	—
1975	389	+2.20%
1982	402	+0.47%
1990	401	−0.03%
1999	424	+0.62%
2007	439	+0.44%
2012	446	+0.32%
2017	454	+0.36%
2023	426	−1.06%
Source: INSEE

== See also ==
- Communes of the Aisne department
