= Bourguignon-sous-Coucy =

- Commune
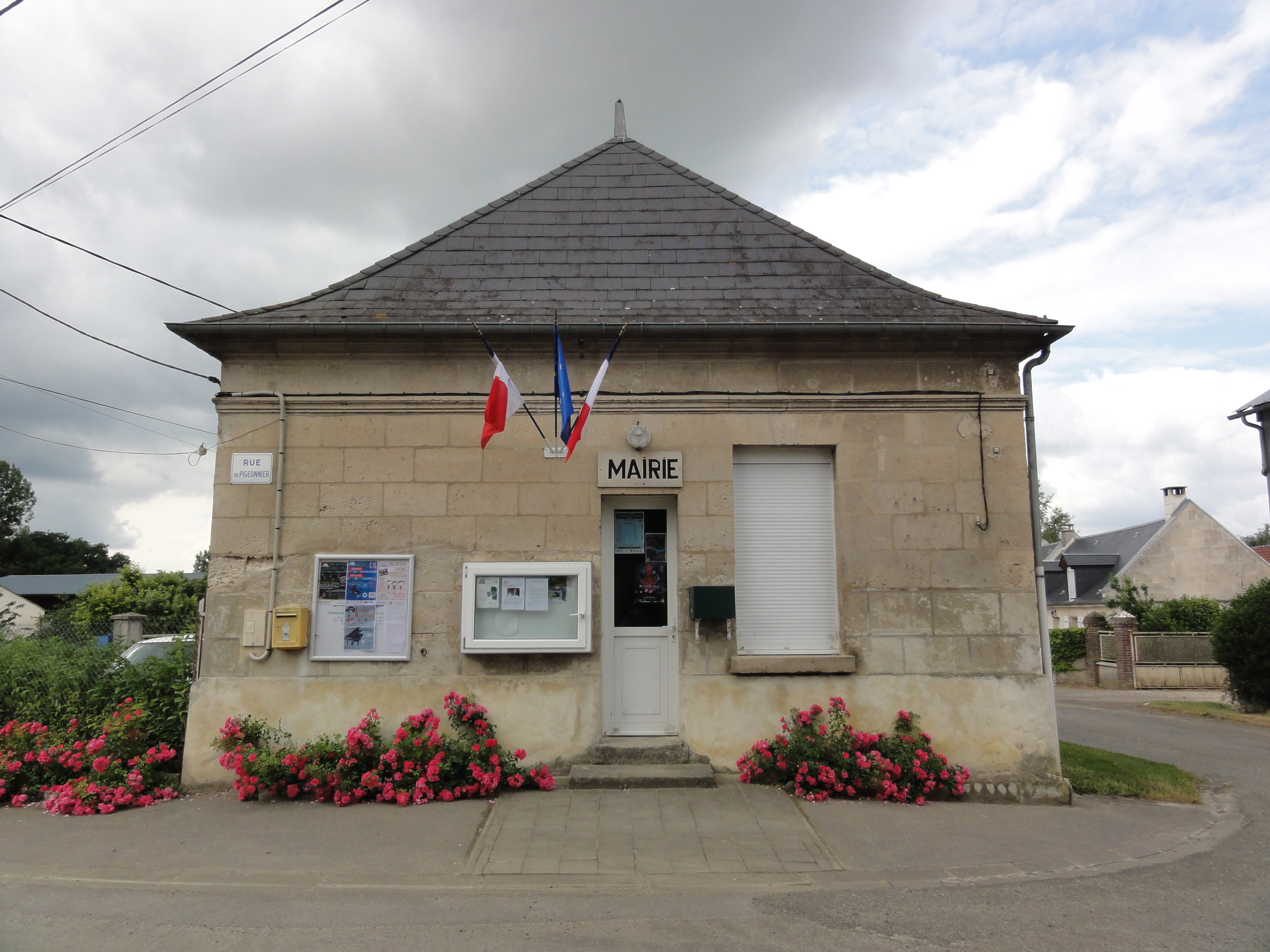
- The town hall of Bourguignon-sous-Coucy
- Location of Bourguignon-sous-Coucy
- Location within France Location within Hauts-de-France
- Coordinates: 49°32′41″N 3°09′34″E
- Country: France
- Region: Hauts-de-France
- Department: Aisne
- Arrondissement: Laon
- Canton: Vic-sur-Aisne

Government
  - Mayor (2026–32): Delphine Marechal
- Area^{1}: 2.8 km^{2} (1.1 sq mi)
- Elevation: 38 m (125 ft)
- Highest elevation: 72 m (236 ft)
- Lowest elevation: 48 m (157 ft)
- Population (2023): 104
  - Density: 37/km^{2} (96/sq mi)
- Time zone: UTC+01:00 (CET)
  - Summer (DST): UTC+02:00 (CEST)
- INSEE/Postal code: 02107 /02300
- ^{1} French Land Register data, which excludes lakes, ponds, glaciers > 1 km^{2} (0.386 sq mi or 247 acres) and river estuaries.

Bourguignon-sous-Coucy (French pronunciation: [buʁɡiɲɔ̃ su kusi]) is a commune in the department of Aisne in Hauts-de-France in northern France.

== Population ==
Historical population
| Year | Pop. | ±% p.a. |
|---|---|---|
| 1968 | 73 | — |
| 1975 | 59 | −3.00% |
| 1982 | 77 | +3.88% |
| 1990 | 99 | +3.19% |
| 1999 | 83 | −1.94% |
| 2007 | 91 | +1.16% |
| 2012 | 96 | +1.08% |
| 2017 | 103 | +1.42% |
| 2023 | 104 | +0.16% |
Source: INSEE

== See also ==
- Communes of the Aisne department
