= Fresnes-sous-Coucy =

- Commune
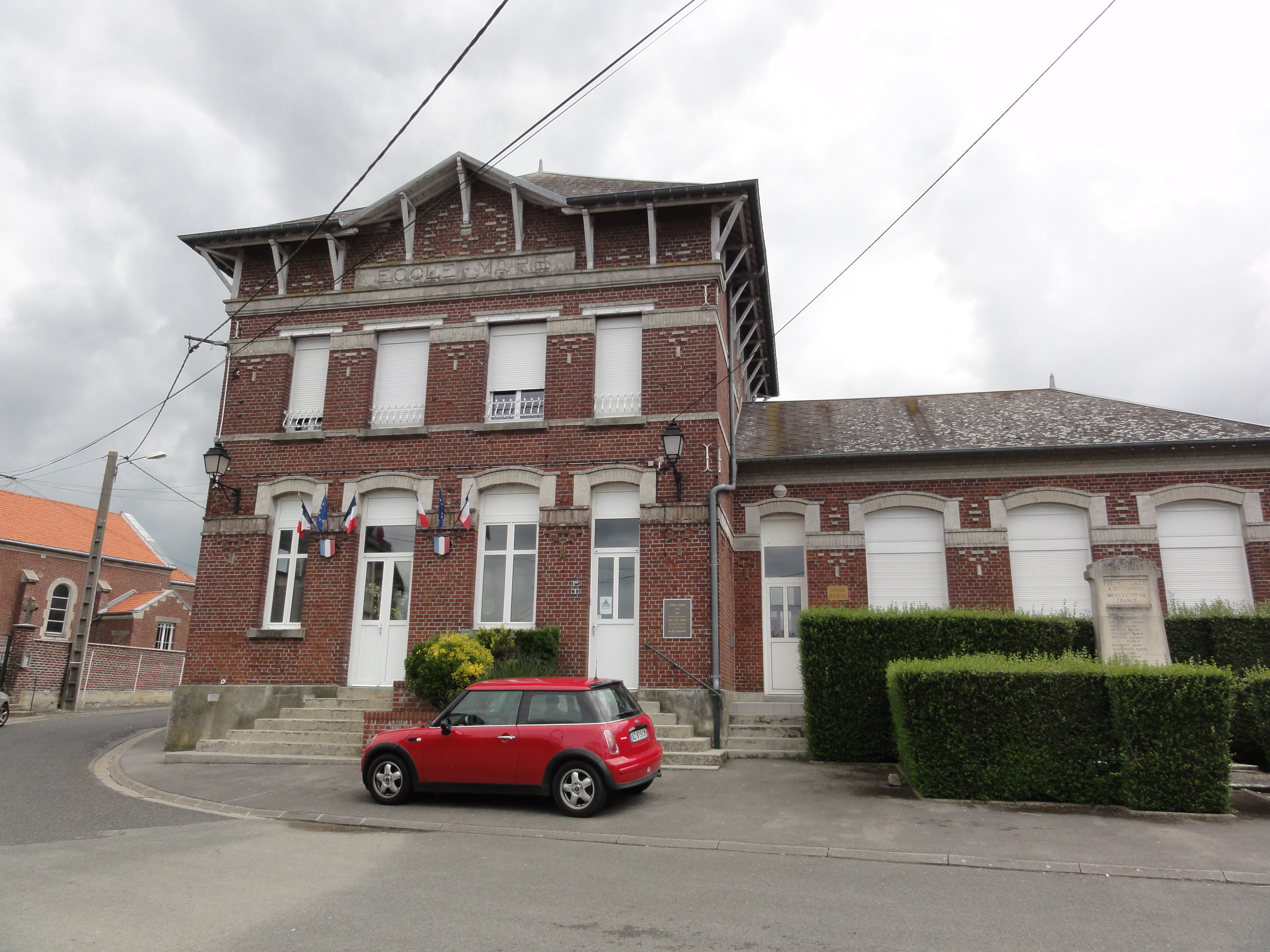
- The town hall of Fresnes
- Location of Fresnes-sous-Coucy
- Location within France Location within Hauts-de-France
- Coordinates: 49°33′16″N 3°22′14″E
- Country: France
- Region: Hauts-de-France
- Department: Aisne
- Arrondissement: Laon
- Canton: Vic-sur-Aisne

Government
  - Mayor (2026–32): Quentin Guilmont
- Area^{1}: 7.3 km^{2} (2.8 sq mi)
- Elevation: 186 m (610 ft)
- Highest elevation: 205 m (673 ft)
- Lowest elevation: 87 m (285 ft)
- Population (2023): 160
  - Density: 22/km^{2} (57/sq mi)
- Time zone: UTC+01:00 (CET)
  - Summer (DST): UTC+02:00 (CEST)
- INSEE/Postal code: 02333 /02380
- ^{1} French Land Register data, which excludes lakes, ponds, glaciers > 1 km^{2} (0.386 sq mi or 247 acres) and river estuaries.

Fresnes-sous-Coucy (French pronunciation: [fʁɛn su kusi]), formerly called Fresnes until 22 December 2017, is a commune in the Aisne department in Hauts-de-France in northern France.

== Population ==
Historical population
Year	Pop.	±% p.a.
1968	170	—
1975	174	+0.33%
1982	145	−2.57%
1990	146	+0.09%
1999	151	+0.37%
2007	147	−0.34%
2012	157	+1.32%
2017	161	+0.50%
2023	160	−0.10%
Source: INSEE

== See also ==
- Communes of the Aisne department
