= Selens =

- Commune
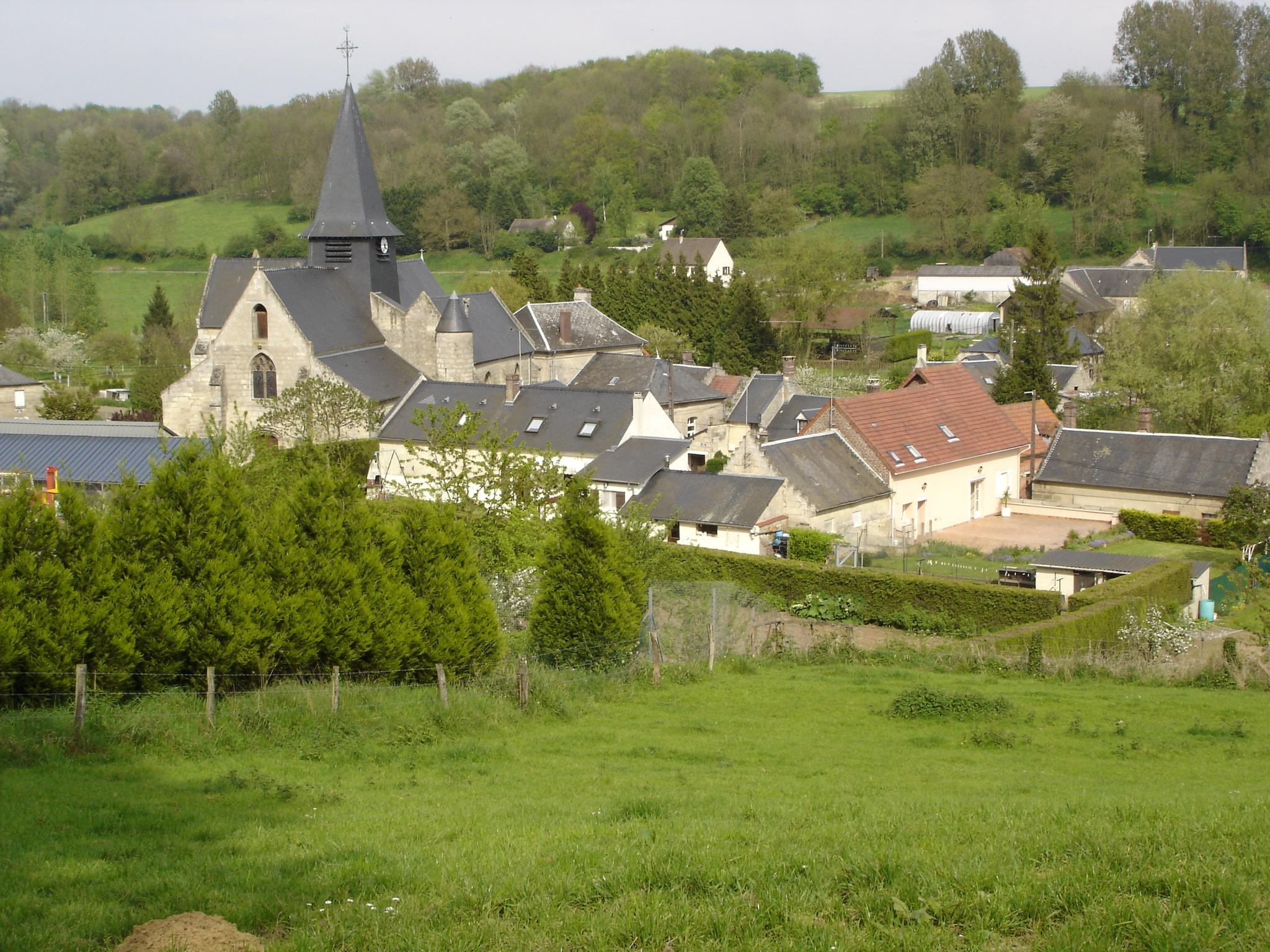
- A general view of Selens

- Coat of arms
- Location of Selens
- Location within France Location within Hauts-de-France
- Coordinates: 49°30′08″N 3°12′38″E
- Country: France
- Region: Hauts-de-France
- Department: Aisne
- Arrondissement: Laon
- Canton: Vic-sur-Aisne

Government
  - Mayor (2026–32): Julian Angot
- Area^{1}: 7.65 km^{2} (2.95 sq mi)
- Elevation: 75 m (246 ft)
- Highest elevation: 154 m (505 ft)
- Lowest elevation: 57 m (187 ft)
- Population (2023): 202
  - Density: 26.4/km^{2} (68.4/sq mi)
- Time zone: UTC+01:00 (CET)
  - Summer (DST): UTC+02:00 (CEST)
- INSEE/Postal code: 02704 /02300
- ^{1} French Land Register data, which excludes lakes, ponds, glaciers > 1 km^{2} (0.386 sq mi or 247 acres) and river estuaries.

Selens (French pronunciation: [səlɑ̃]) is a commune in the Aisne department in Hauts-de-France in northern France.

== Population ==
Historical population
Year	Pop.	±% p.a.
1968	224	—
1975	198	−1.75%
1982	222	+1.65%
1990	214	−0.46%
1999	209	−0.26%
2007	240	+1.74%
2012	237	−0.25%
2017	250	+1.07%
2023	202	−3.49%
Source: INSEE

== See also ==
- Communes of the Aisne department
