= Crécy-au-Mont =

- Commune
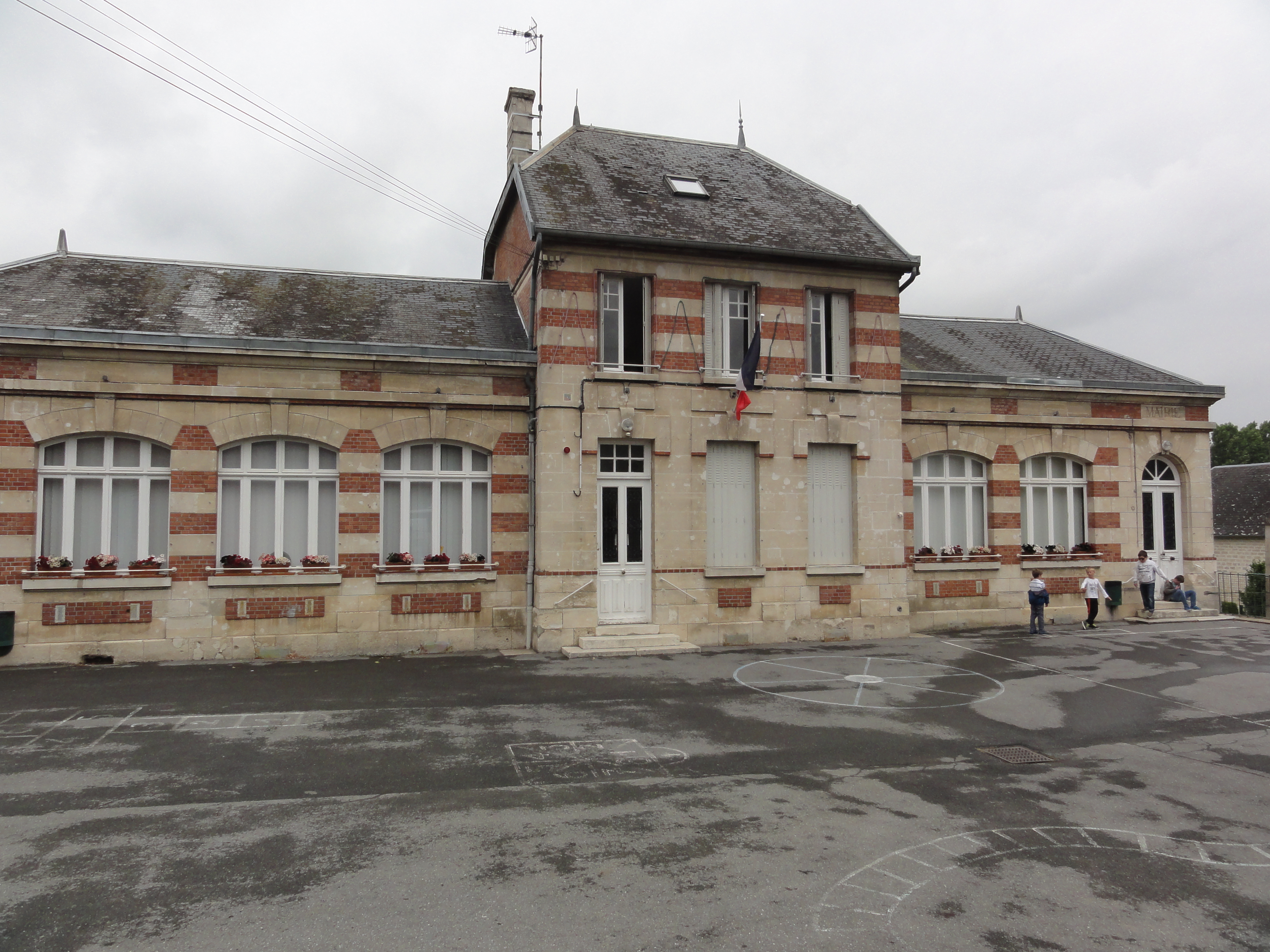
- The town hall and school of Crécy-au-Mont

- Coat of arms
- Location of Crécy-au-Mont
- Location within France Location within Hauts-de-France
- Coordinates: 49°29′19″N 3°19′32″E
- Country: France
- Region: Hauts-de-France
- Department: Aisne
- Arrondissement: Laon
- Canton: Vic-sur-Aisne

Government
  - Mayor (2026–32): Vincent Morlet
- Area^{1}: 11.83 km^{2} (4.57 sq mi)
- Elevation: 136 m (446 ft)
- Highest elevation: 160 m (520 ft)
- Lowest elevation: 48 m (157 ft)
- Population (2023): 335
  - Density: 28.3/km^{2} (73.3/sq mi)
- Time zone: UTC+01:00 (CET)
  - Summer (DST): UTC+02:00 (CEST)
- INSEE/Postal code: 02236 /02380
- ^{1} French Land Register data, which excludes lakes, ponds, glaciers > 1 km^{2} (0.386 sq mi or 247 acres) and river estuaries.

Crécy-au-Mont (French pronunciation: [kʁesi o mɔ̃]) is a commune in the Aisne department in Hauts-de-France in northern France.

== Geography ==
The river Ailette forms most of the commune's northern border.

== Population ==
Historical population
Year	Pop.	±% p.a.
1968	295	—
1975	251	−2.28%
1982	296	+2.38%
1990	294	−0.08%
1999	290	−0.15%
2007	316	+1.08%
2012	304	−0.77%
2017	346	+2.62%
2023	335	−0.54%
Source: INSEE

== See also ==
- Communes of the Aisne department
