= Champs, Aisne =

Champs
- Commune
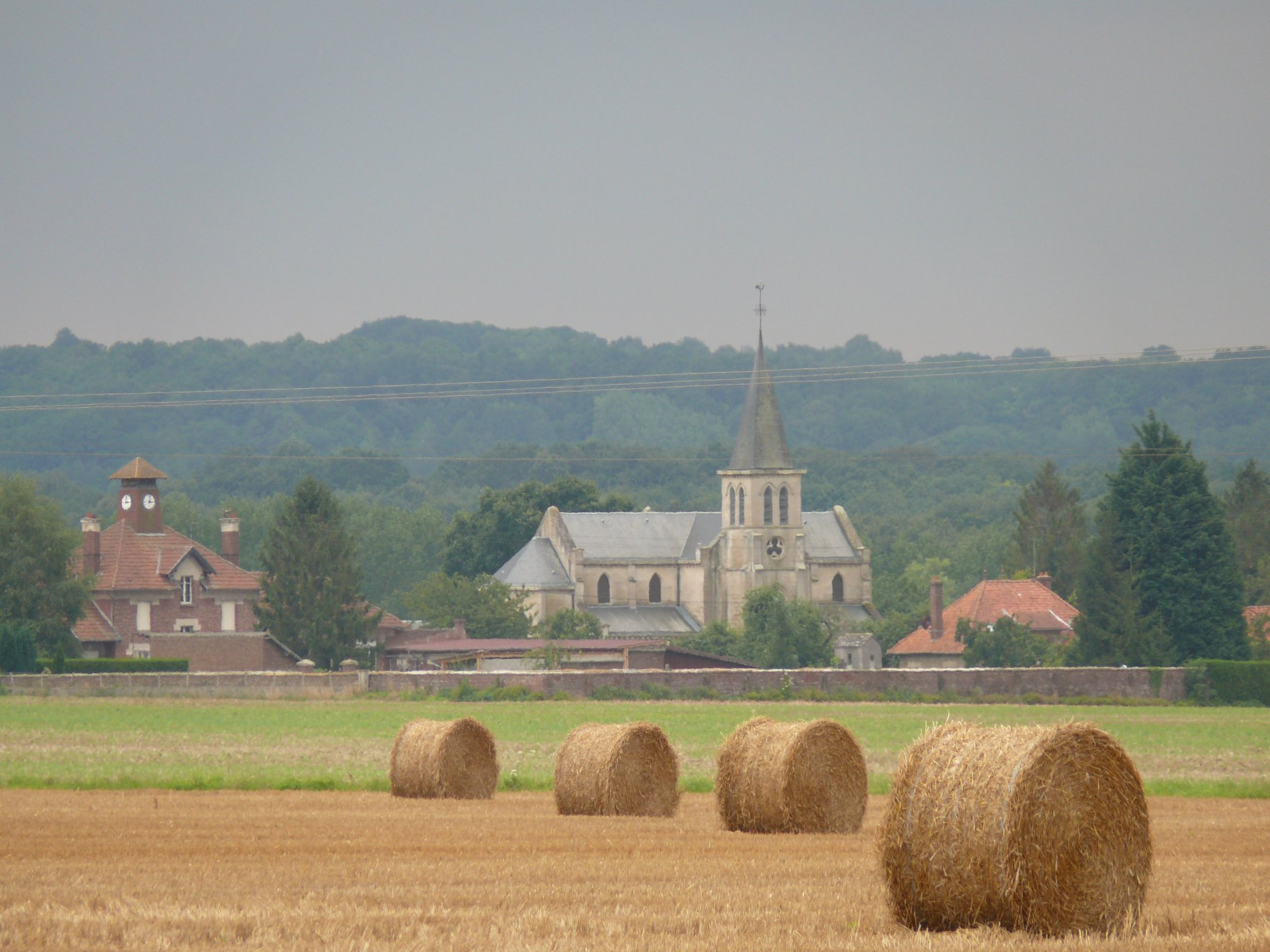
- The church of Champs
- Location of Champs
- Location within France Location within Hauts-de-France
- Coordinates: 49°32′28″N 3°15′15″E
- Country: France
- Region: Hauts-de-France
- Department: Aisne
- Arrondissement: Laon
- Canton: Vic-sur-Aisne

Government
  - Mayor (2026–32): Marie-Angéline Tenaillon
- Area^{1}: 9.16 km^{2} (3.54 sq mi)
- Elevation: 50 m (160 ft)
- Highest elevation: 76 m (249 ft)
- Lowest elevation: 42 m (138 ft)
- Population (2023): 313
  - Density: 34.2/km^{2} (88.5/sq mi)
- Time zone: UTC+01:00 (CET)
  - Summer (DST): UTC+02:00 (CEST)
- INSEE/Postal code: 02159 /02670
- ^{1} French Land Register data, which excludes lakes, ponds, glaciers > 1 km^{2} (0.386 sq mi or 247 acres) and river estuaries.

Champs (French pronunciation: [ʃɑ̃]) is a commune in the Aisne department in Hauts-de-France in northern France.

== Geography ==
The river Ailette forms all of the commune's southwestern border.

== Population ==
Historical population
Year	Pop.	±% p.a.
1968	367	—
1975	334	−1.34%
1982	300	−1.52%
1990	291	−0.38%
1999	275	−0.63%
2007	286	+0.49%
2012	288	+0.14%
2017	280	−0.56%
2023	313	+1.87%
Source: INSEE

== See also ==
- Communes of the Aisne department
