= Bichancourt =

- Commune
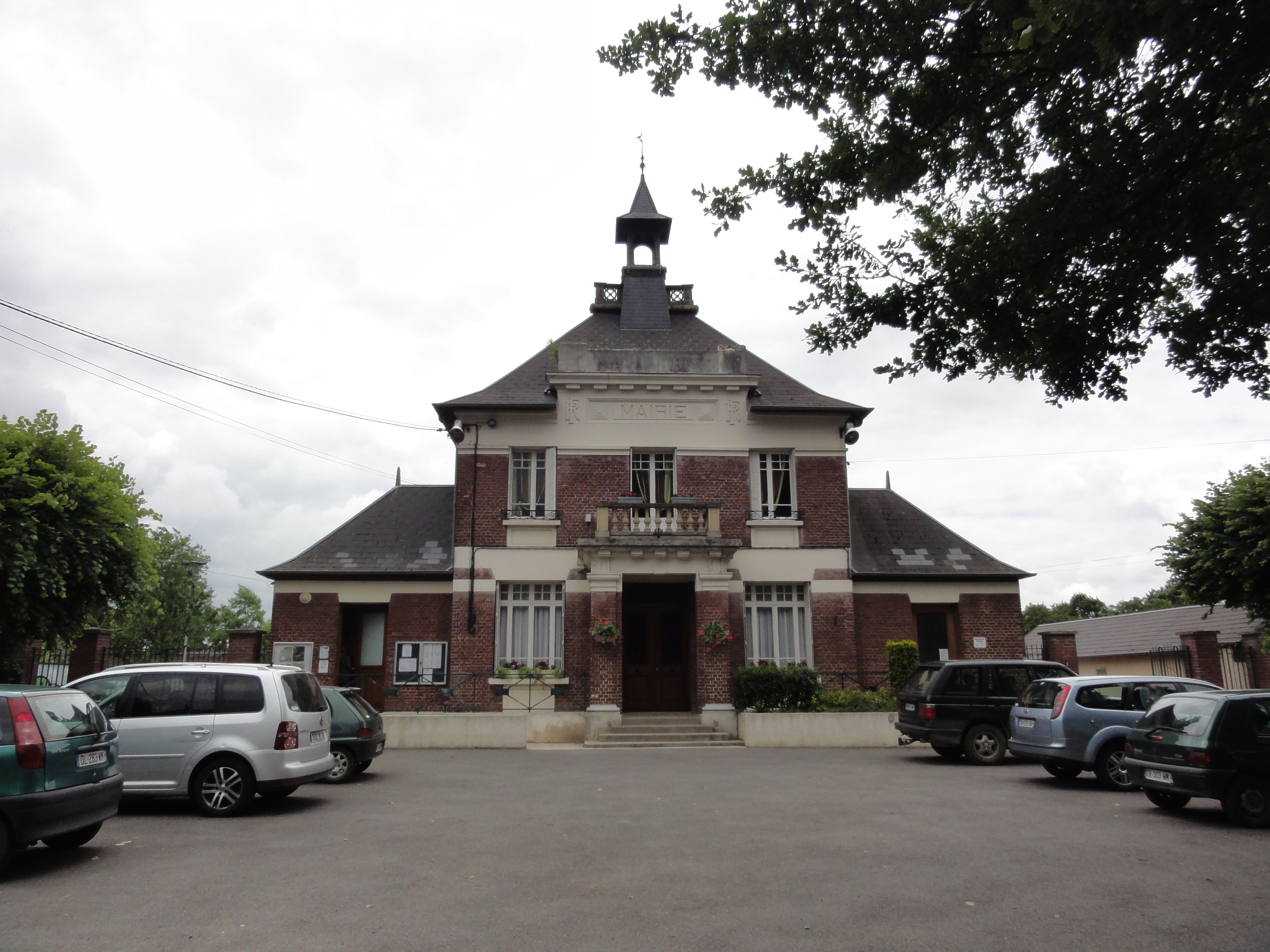
- The town hall of Bichancourt
- Location of Bichancourt
- Location within France Location within Hauts-de-France
- Coordinates: 49°34′49″N 3°12′55″E
- Country: France
- Region: Hauts-de-France
- Department: Aisne
- Arrondissement: Laon
- Canton: Vic-sur-Aisne
- Intercommunality: CA Chauny Tergnier La Fère

Government
  - Mayor (2026–32): Fabrice Marlin
- Area^{1}: 7.73 km^{2} (2.98 sq mi)
- Elevation: 61 m (200 ft)
- Highest elevation: 67 m (220 ft)
- Lowest elevation: 41 m (135 ft)
- Population (2023): 979
  - Density: 127/km^{2} (328/sq mi)
- Time zone: UTC+01:00 (CET)
  - Summer (DST): UTC+02:00 (CEST)
- INSEE/Postal code: 02086 /02300
- ^{1} French Land Register data, which excludes lakes, ponds, glaciers > 1 km^{2} (0.386 sq mi or 247 acres) and river estuaries.

Bichancourt (French pronunciation: [biʃɑ̃kuʁ]) is a commune in the department of Aisne in Hauts-de-France in northern France.

== Geography ==
The river Oise forms part of the commune's northern border; one of its tributaries, the Ailette, forms all of the commune's southwestern border.

== Population ==
Historical population
Year	Pop.	±% p.a.
1968	768	—
1975	756	−0.22%
1982	924	+2.91%
1990	902	−0.30%
1999	941	+0.47%
2007	966	+0.33%
2012	1,061	+1.89%
2017	1,048	−0.25%
2023	979	−1.13%
Source: INSEE

== See also ==
- Communes of the Aisne department
