= Trosly-Loire =

- Commune
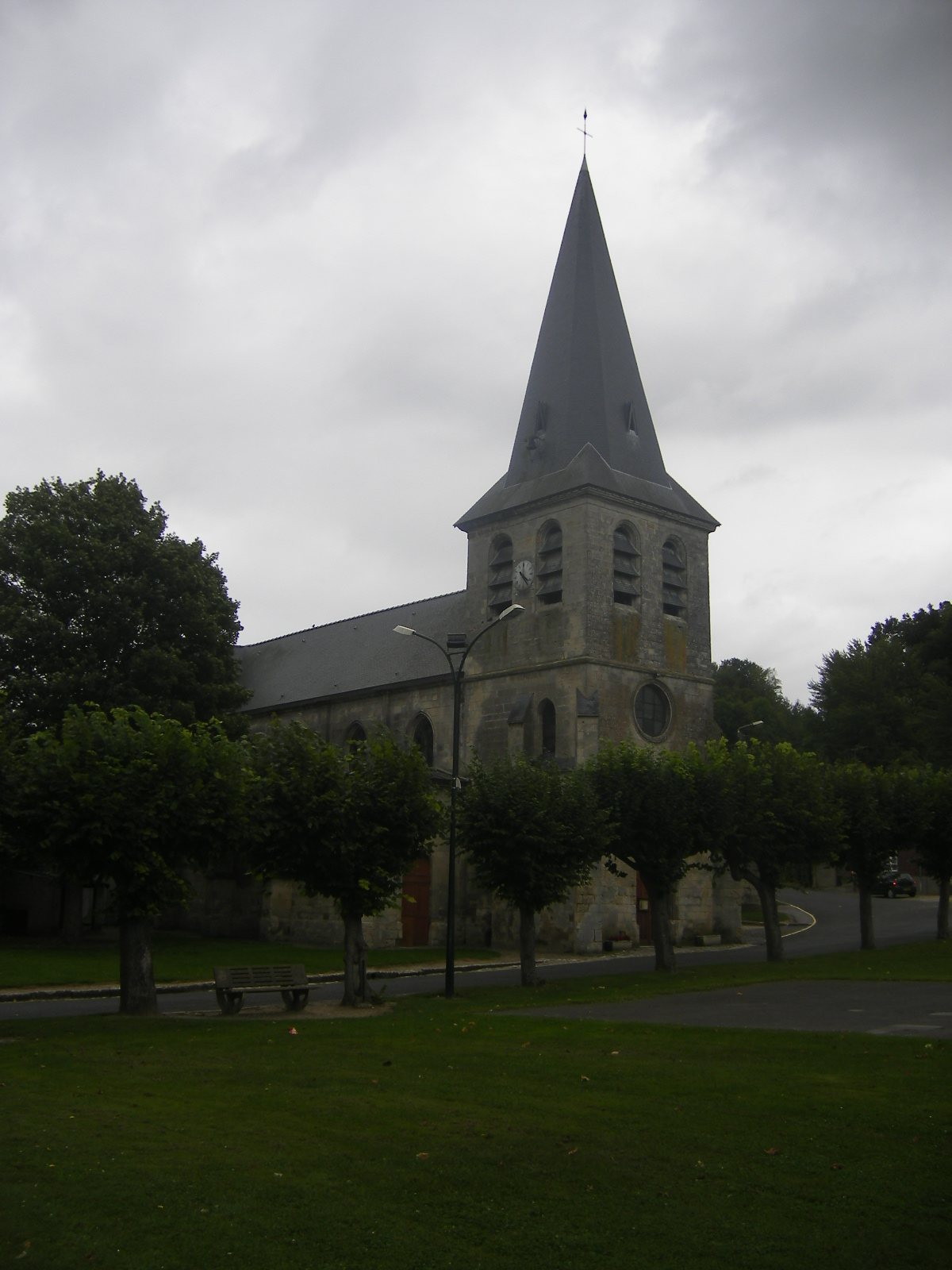
- The church of Trosly-Loire
- Location of Trosly-Loire
- Location within France Location within Hauts-de-France
- Coordinates: 49°31′10″N 3°13′39″E
- Country: France
- Region: Hauts-de-France
- Department: Aisne
- Arrondissement: Laon
- Canton: Vic-sur-Aisne

Government
  - Mayor (2026–32): Thierry Lemoine
- Area^{1}: 15.21 km^{2} (5.87 sq mi)
- Elevation: 110 m (360 ft)
- Highest elevation: 157 m (515 ft)
- Lowest elevation: 43 m (141 ft)
- Population (2023): 541
  - Density: 35.6/km^{2} (92.1/sq mi)
- Time zone: UTC+01:00 (CET)
  - Summer (DST): UTC+02:00 (CEST)
- INSEE/Postal code: 02750 /02300
- ^{1} French Land Register data, which excludes lakes, ponds, glaciers > 1 km^{2} (0.386 sq mi or 247 acres) and river estuaries.

Trosly-Loire (French pronunciation: [tʁoli lwaʁ]) is a commune in the Aisne department in Hauts-de-France in northern France.

== Geography ==
The river Ailette forms all of the commune's northeastern border.

== Population ==
Historical population
Year	Pop.	±% p.a.
1968	560	—
1975	587	+0.67%
1982	609	+0.53%
1990	623	+0.28%
1999	621	−0.04%
2007	578	−0.89%
2012	604	+0.88%
2017	613	+0.30%
2023	541	−2.06%
Source: INSEE

== See also ==
- Communes of the Aisne department
