= Leuilly-sous-Coucy =

- Commune
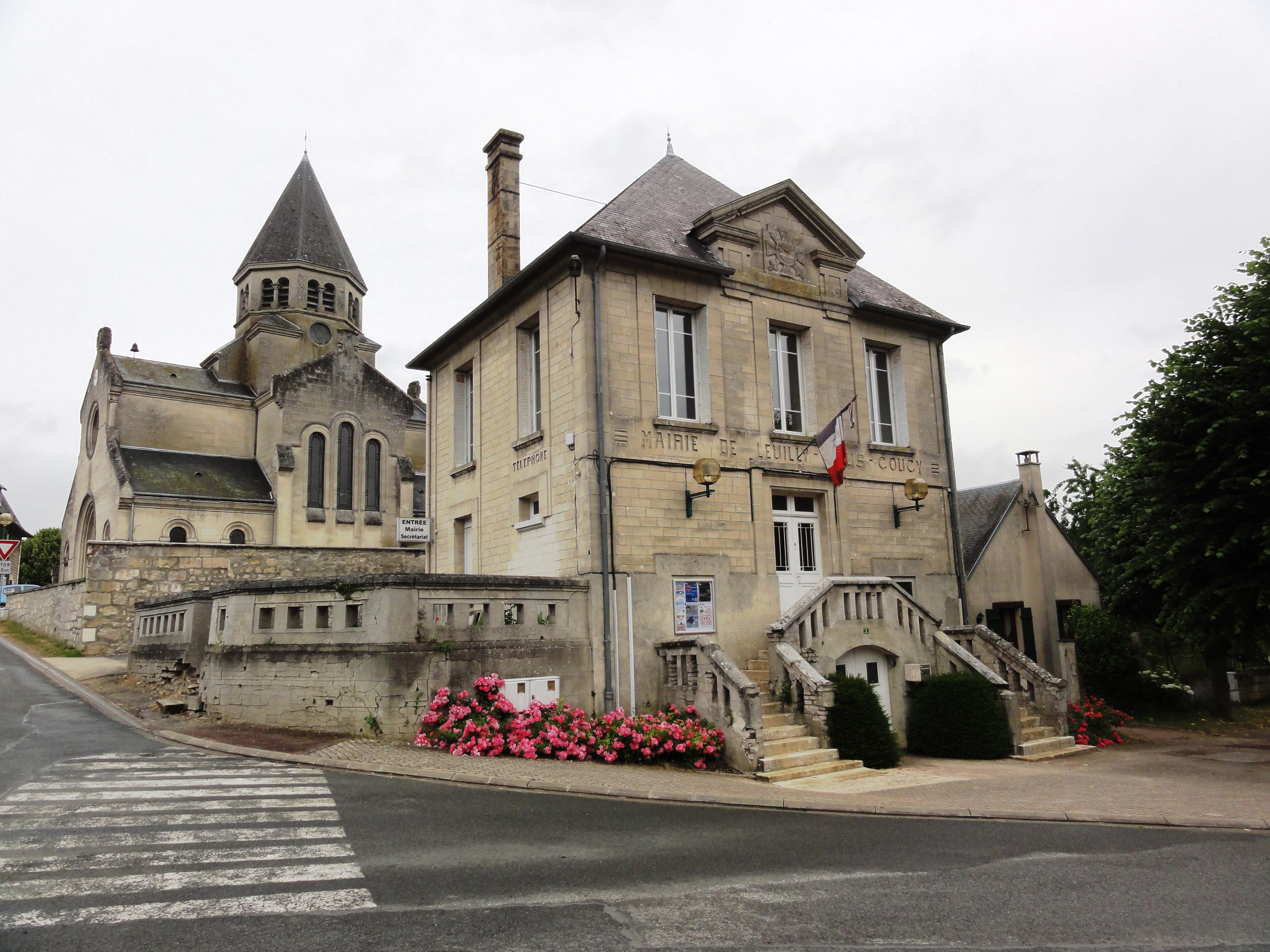
- The town hall and church of Leuilly-sous-Coucy
- Location of Leuilly-sous-Coucy
- Location within France Location within Hauts-de-France
- Coordinates: 49°28′47″N 3°21′33″E
- Country: France
- Region: Hauts-de-France
- Department: Aisne
- Arrondissement: Laon
- Canton: Vic-sur-Aisne

Government
  - Mayor (2026–32): Valérie Blangeois
- Area^{1}: 12.69 km^{2} (4.90 sq mi)
- Elevation: 120 m (390 ft)
- Highest elevation: 162 m (531 ft)
- Lowest elevation: 51 m (167 ft)
- Population (2023): 455
  - Density: 35.9/km^{2} (92.9/sq mi)
- Time zone: UTC+01:00 (CET)
  - Summer (DST): UTC+02:00 (CEST)
- INSEE/Postal code: 02423 /02380
- ^{1} French Land Register data, which excludes lakes, ponds, glaciers > 1 km^{2} (0.386 sq mi or 247 acres) and river estuaries.

Leuilly-sous-Coucy (French pronunciation: [lœji su kusi]) is a commune in the Aisne department in Hauts-de-France in northern France.

== Geography ==
The river Ailette forms all of the commune's northern border.

== Population ==
Historical population
Year	Pop.	±% p.a.
1968	414	—
1975	395	−0.67%
1982	405	+0.36%
1990	415	+0.31%
1999	418	+0.08%
2007	420	+0.06%
2012	395	−1.22%
2017	420	+1.23%
2023	455	+1.34%
Source: INSEE

== See also ==
- Communes of the Aisne department
