= Verneuil-sous-Coucy =

- Commune
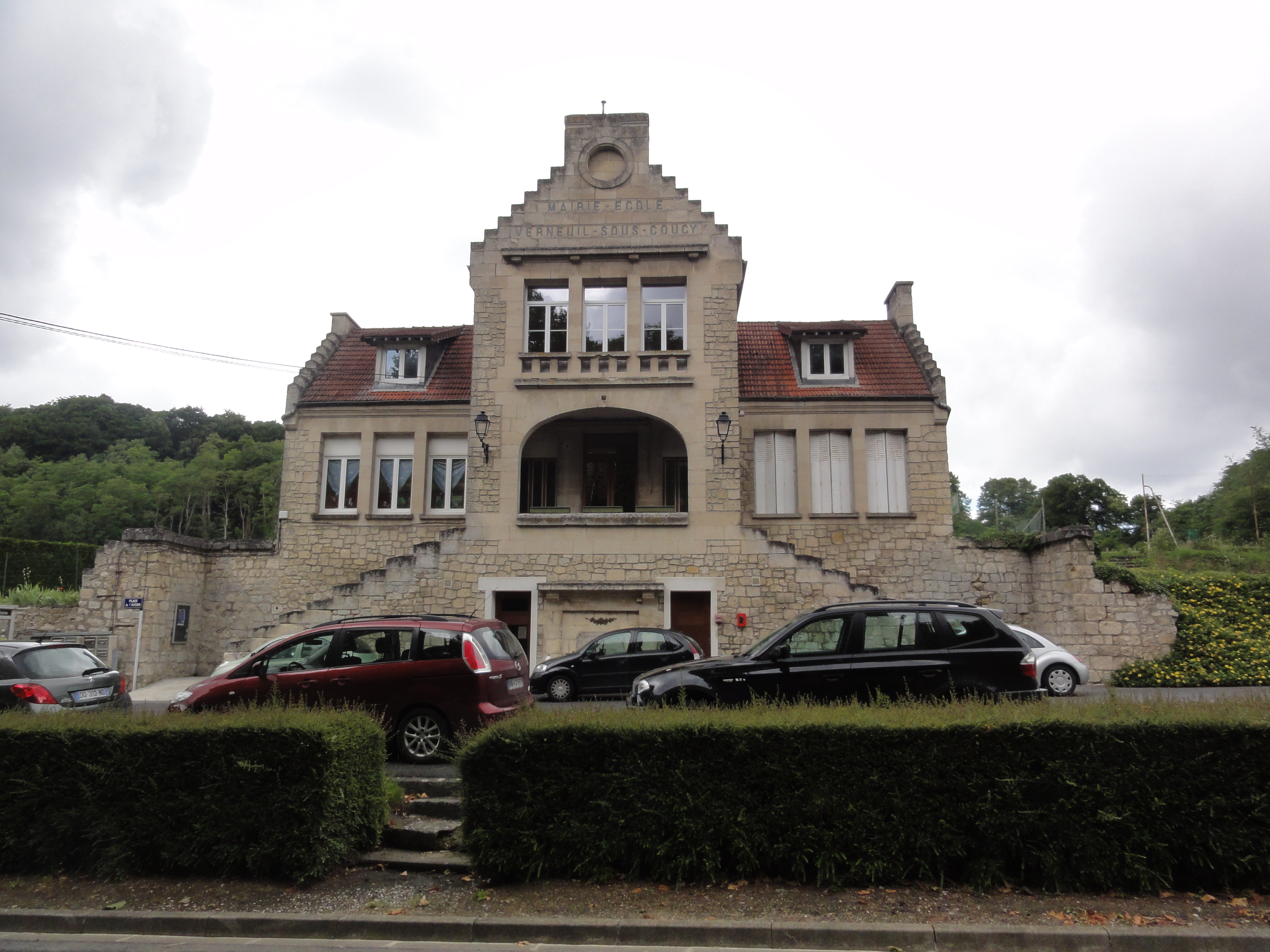
- The town hall of Verneuil-sous-Coucy
- Location of Verneuil-sous-Coucy
- Location within France Location within Hauts-de-France
- Coordinates: 49°32′32″N 3°18′52″E
- Country: France
- Region: Hauts-de-France
- Department: Aisne
- Arrondissement: Laon
- Canton: Vic-sur-Aisne
- Intercommunality: Picardie des Châteaux

Government
  - Mayor (2026–32): Gladys Cronier
- Area^{1}: 4.58 km^{2} (1.77 sq mi)
- Highest elevation: 167 m (548 ft)
- Lowest elevation: 64 m (210 ft)
- Population (2023): 139
  - Density: 30.3/km^{2} (78.6/sq mi)
- Time zone: UTC+01:00 (CET)
  - Summer (DST): UTC+02:00 (CEST)
- INSEE/Postal code: 02786 /02380
- ^{1} French Land Register data, which excludes lakes, ponds, glaciers > 1 km^{2} (0.386 sq mi or 247 acres) and river estuaries.

Verneuil-sous-Coucy (French pronunciation: [vɛʁnœj su kusi]) is a commune in the Aisne department in Hauts-de-France in northern France.

== Population ==
Historical population
Year	Pop.	±% p.a.
1968	114	—
1975	139	+2.87%
1982	127	−1.28%
1990	171	+3.79%
1999	135	−2.59%
2007	127	−0.76%
2012	130	+0.47%
2017	129	−0.15%
2023	139	+1.25%
Source: INSEE

== See also ==
- Communes of the Aisne department
