= Armorial of the Communes of Oise (I–P) =

This page lists the armoury (emblazons=graphics and blazons=heraldic descriptions; or coats of arms) of the communes from I-P in Oise (department 60)

Other pages:

- Armorial of the Communes of Oise (A–C)
- Armorial of the Communes of Oise (D–H)
- Armorial of the Communes of Oise (I–P)
- Armorial of the Communes of Oise (Q–Z)

== J ==
| Image | Name of Commune | French original blazon | English blazon |
|---|---|---|---|
| | Jaulzy | | |

== L ==
| Image | Name of Commune | French original blazon | English blazon |
|---|---|---|---|
| | Labosse | fuselé d'argent et de gueules. | Fusilly argent and gules. (the Principality of Monaco and the communes of Labosse, Leigné-sur-Usseau and Saint-Amand use the same arms.) |
| | Lachapelle-aux-Pots | d'or à la barre de gueules, au pot de sable, avec bec à dextre et anse à senestre, brochant sur le tout. | Or, a bend sinister gules, overall a pot sable, spout to dexter, handle to sinister. |
| | Lamorlaye | Orangé à la filière d’or, au chevron d’azur bordé aussi d’or brochant, chargé de trois besants d’argent et accompagné de trois merlettes aussi d’or. | Tenné fimbriated Or, on a chevron azure fimbriated between 3 martlets Or, 3 plates [argent]. |
| | Larbroye | tiercé en fasce: au premier d'azur à l'ours au naturel, au second d'argent à l'arbre de sinople, au troisieme parti au premièr de sable à la broye d'argent et au second de gueules à la fasce d'argent. | Tierced per fess: 1: Azure, a bear proper; 2: Argent, a tree vert; 3: Per pale I: sable a broye argent and II: gules, a fess argent. (the broye is also called a horse-bray in English, but I kept the original term for canting purposes.) |
| | Lattainville | d'or au sautoir de gueules, à l'écusson d'azur à la crosse d'or acosté des lettres G et F capitales du même brochant en coeur sur le tout. | Or, a saltire gules, overall on an inescutcheon azure, a crozer between the capital letters G and F Or. |
| | Lévignen | écartelé d'or et de gueules, à 3 besants d'argent 2 en chef et 1 en pointe brochant sur la partition. | Quarterly Or and gules, 3 plates [argent]. |
| | Liancourt | Ecartelé au 1) d’argent à la croix engrêlée de gueules chargée de cinq coquilles d’or, au 2) burelé d’argent et d’azur aux trois chevrons de gueules, le premier écimé, brochant sur le tout, au 3) de gueules aux monogramme des Arts et Métiers d’or, brochant sur une roue dentée du même au 4) d’azur au soc de charrue d’argent et au marteau du même passés en sautoir; le tout d’argent à la fasce de sable. | Quarterly 1: Argent, on a cross engrailed gules, 5 escallops Or; 2: Barry argent and azure, 3 chevrons gules, the top one écimé; 3: Gules, a toothed wheel, overall the monogram of the «Arts et Métiers» Or; 4: Azure, a ploughshare and a hammer in saltire argent; overall, on an inescutcheon argent, a fess sable. (écimé is a French heraldic term meaning chopped off at the top) |
| | Liancourt-Saint-Pierre | parti : au premier de gueules à tête d'homme d'argent de profil au poil levé d'or surmontée d'un outil préhistorique aussi d'argent, au second d'or au casque gaulois taré à demi-profil accompagné, en chef, d'une couronne de laurier et, en pointe, de deux clefs passées en sautoir, le tout de sinople. | Gules, a flint 'axe' and a man's head affronty argent, with raised hair Or impaled with Or, a gaulish helmet in demi-profile between, in pale, a laurel crown and 2 keys in saltire vert. |
| | Litz | Parti : au 1er mi-parti de gueules à la croix d'or chargée de trois fleurs de lis de gueules rangées en fasce, cantonnée au chef dextre d'une croix de Malte d'argent chargée d'un besant du même en cœur et en pointe dextre d'une clef d'or, au 2e d'azur à la bande d'argent. | Gules, on a cross Or between 2 Maltese crosses argent each charged with a plate and 2 keys Or. dimidiated with Azure, a chevron throughout argent. (actually the sinister side is supposed to be 'Azure, a bend argent', but English blazon doesn't have a way for the dexter side to be treated as dimidiated and the sinister side as impaled.) |
| | Loconville | d’azur au chevron accompagné en chef de deux coquilles et en pointe d’un cor de chasse, tous d'argent. | Azure, a chevron between 2 escallops and a hunting horn argent. |
| | Longueil-Annel | parti au premier d’argent à la croix de gueules chargé de cinq besants d’or, au second d’azur à la barre à roue d’or soutenue d’une rivière ondée d’argent posée en barre. | Argent, on a cross gules, 5 bezants [Or]. impaled with Azure, wheel Or above a bend sinister wavy argent [river]. |
| | Longueil-Sainte-Marie | Parti : au 1er d'argent à la hallebarde d'or, le fût d'azur, au 2e coupé au I de gueules à deux haches d'armes d'argent passées en sautoir, au II d'azur au mur de ville d'argent ouvert du champ avec une tour à dextre crénelée et couverte d'argent. | Argent a halberd Or, handled azure. impaled with Per fess gules and azure, 2 battle-axes in saltire and the city wall crenellated with tower conjoined to dexter argent. |
| | Lormaison | d’azur au chevron d’or chargé des trois arbres arrachés de sable, accompagné en chef de deux chateaux d’argent et en pointe d’un loup du même, au chef cousu de gueules chargé de trois coquilles aussi d’argent. | Azure, on a chevron Or between 2 castles and a wolf argent, 3 trees eradicated sable, and on a chief gules, 3 escallops argent. |

== M ==
| Image | Name of Commune | French original blazon | English blazon |
|---|---|---|---|
| | Maignelay-Montigny | accolés 1) de gueules à la bande d'or 2) d'argent au trois lionceaux de sable lampassé de gueules et couronné d'or. | 2 shields accolés: Gules, a bend Or. and Argent, 3 lions sable armed and langued gules, crowned Or. |
| | Maimbeville | Taillé d'argent à trois bandes d'azur et aussi d'argent semé de fleur de lys aussi d'azur, à la barre du même brochant sur le tout. | Per bend sinister, 1: Argent, 3 bends azure; and 2: argent semy de lys azure; a bend sinister on the line of partition. |
| | Marest-sur-Matz | Coupé au premier d’argent à trois écussons de gueules posé en fasce, au second d’azur à la bande ondée d’or. | Per fess, 1: argent, in fess 3 inescutcheons gules; 2: Azure, a bend wavy Or. |
| | Margny-lès-Compiègne | Parti au premier d’azur au lion d'argent, au second d’orangé à la fleur de lys aussi d’argent, au chef d’azur chargé d’un m stylisé en onde orangé. | Per pale azure and tenné, a lion and a fleur-de-lys argent, and on a chief azure a stylized wavy letter 'm' tenné. |
| | Margny-sur-Matz | parti d’or et d’azur à l’ours en pied de l’un en l’autre à la champagne aussi d’azur brochant sur la partitions, chargé de trois fleurs de lys aussi d’or rangées en fasce et sommée d’une devise ondée d’argent. | Per pale Or and azure, a bear rampant counterchanged, and overall on a base wavy azure 3 fleurs-de-lys Or, a barrulet fesswise wavy on the line of division argent. |
| | Marquéglise | de gueules à une fleur de lys d'or. | Gules, a fleur-de-lys Or. (Bourg-de-Visa and Marquéglise use the same arms.) |
| | Mello | d'or à deux fasces de gueules à neuf merlettes du même posées en orle. | Or, 2 fesses, and 9 martlets in orle gules. |
| | Méru | De gueules à la barre d’or chargée de 5 tourteaux de sable, accompagnée, en chef d’un éventail de quinze plis au naturel, en pointe d'une Marque à jouer tournée d'argent, et senestrée de deux dominos aussi d'argent pointés de sable, posés et rangés en pal, le "trois/zéro" sur le "quatre/deux". | |
| | Le Mesnil-en-Thelle | d'azur aux trois abeilles d'or disposées 2 et 1; l'écu surmonté d'une couronne muralle. | Azure, 3 bees Or. The achievement consists of the shield topped with a mural crown. |
| | Le Mesnil-Saint-Firmin | écartelé en 1) taillé : au premier d’or aux trois bandes d’azur, au second aussi d’azur semé de fleurs de lys d’or; à la barre d’argent brochant sur la partition, en 2) d'or aux trois forces de sable posées 2 et 1, en 3) d'argent au trois lionceaux de gueules et en 4) d'azur aux trois fleurs de lys d'or posées 2 et 1. | Quarterly 1: per bend sinister, Or 3 bends azure, and azure semy de lys Or, a bend sinister on the line of division argent; 2: Or, 3 blade shears sable; 3: Argent, 3 lions gules; and 4: Azure, 3 fleurs-de-lys Or. |
| | Le Mesnil-Théribus | d’argent à la bande ondée d’azur accompagnée, en chef d’un bouton de sable cerclé d’azur percé de quatre trous du champ et d’une épée d’académicien versée de sinople, celle-ci entrelacée de deux serpents affrontées du même et en pointe d’une palette de peintre de gueules contenant trois pinceaux du même emmanchés aussi de sable. | Argent, a bend wavy azure between in chief a button sable rimmed azure pierced with 4 holes of the field and an academician's sword entwined with 2 serpents respectant vert, and in base a painter's palette holding 3 brushes gules, handled sable. |
| | Le Meux | écartelé: au premier d'azur à deux poissons adossés d'argent accompagnés de quatre billettes d'or 1,2,1; au second de gueules à la fasce d'argent; au troisieme d'or au lion contourné d'azur, au quatrième mi coupé mi parti d'hermine à la bordure d'azur chargée de 10 fers à cheval d'or. | Quarterly 1: Azure, 2 fish addorsed argent between 4 billets arranged 1,2,1 Or; 2: Gules, a fess argent; 3: Or, a lion contourny azure; 4: the sinister base portion of arms that in full would have been Ermine, on a bordure azure, 10 horseshoes Or. (I don't believe English heraldry has any way to appropriately blazon that 4th quarter.) |
| | Mogneville | écartelé d'azur à trois fleur de lys d'or et d'or a trois lionceaux de gueules. | Quarterly Azure, 3 fleurs-de-lys Or and Or, 3 lions gules. |
| | Moliens | d'argent aux trois coeurs couronnés de gueules. | Argent, 3 hearts crowned gules. |
| | Monceaux | écartele au un: d'azur à la fleurs de lys d'or; au deux: d'argent au lion de gueules; au trois: aussi d'argent à un M majuscule aussi de gueules; au quatre: d'azur plain. | Quarterly 1: Azure, a fleur-de-lys Or; 2: Argent, a lion gules; 3: Argent, a capital letter M gules; and 4: Azure simple. |
| | Monchy-Saint-Éloi | D’argent au tube à canon posé en fasce accompagne de trois cloche le tout de sinople. | Argent, a cannon fesswise between 3 bells vert. |
| | Montagny-en-Vexin | D’azur à la bande d’argent chargée de trois coquilles de gueules. | Azure, on a bend argent 3 escallops gules. |
| | Montagny-Sainte-Félicité | D’azur à la croix ancrée d'argent. | Azure, a cross moline argent. |
| | Montataire | D’azur au rocher d’or, sommé d’une tour du même ouverte, ajourée et maçonnée de sable, accostée de deux étoiles de six rais aussi d’or, au pont en poutre métallique de sable, supporté par deux piles d’or brochant sur le pied du rocher, le tout posé sur une champagne cousue de gueules, supporté à dextre par un lion contournée, la patte senestre sur la tour et la dextre sur la pile dextre du pont, empiétant une enclume en bande et à senestre, par un chien, la patte dextre sur la tour et la senestre sur la pile senestre du pont, empiétant un marteau en bande, les deux animaux brochant sur la champagne, accostant, en pointe, une lettre M capitale calligraphiée surmontée d’une étoile de six rais, le tout aussi d’or. | |
| | Montjavoult | D’or aux deux doloires de gueules en demi-cercle enforme de mont, surmontées d’un sautoir ancré d’azur chargé d’une fleur de lys du champ. | |
| | Mortefontaine | de gueules à la divise abaissée, accompagnée, en chef, de trois hérissons ordonnés 2 et 1 et, en pointe, de deux sangliers rangés en fasce, le tout de sinople. | Gules, a fess/barrulet abassed, in chief 3 urchins (2&1) and in base 2 boars vert. |
| | Mortemer | Parti : au 1er d'azur à trois fleurs de lis d'or, au 2e de gueules à trois chevaux d'or rangés en pal. | Azure, 3 fleurs-de-lys Or impaled with Gules, in pale 3 horses passant Or. |
| | Mouy | d'or à un sautoir de gueules, cantonné de 4 merlettes du même. | Or, a saltire between 4 martlets gules. |
| | Muirancourt | écartele au un et quatre d'or au lion de gueules couronné d'azur; au deux et trois de gueules à un arbre d'argent et au chef échiqueté d'argent et d'azur; à l'écu d'argent bandé de gueules brochant sur le tout. | Quarterly 1&4: Or, a lion gules crowned azure; 2&3 Gules, a tree argent, and a chief chequy argent and azure. |

== N ==
| Image | Name of Commune | French original blazon | English blazon |
|---|---|---|---|
| | Nanteuil-le-Haudouin | écartelé : au premier de gueules aux six fleurs de lys d'or ordonnées 3, 2 et 1, au deuxième d'or à la bande de gueules accompagnée de six merlettes du même ordonnées en orle, au troisième d'argent au lion coupé de gueules et de sinople, au quatrième d'azur aux trois fleurs de lys d'or accompagnées, en abîme, d'un bâton péri de gueules en bande. | Quarterly 1: Gules, 6 fleurs-de-lys Or; 2: Or, a bend between 6 martlets in orle gules; 3: Argent, a lion per fess gules and vert; 4: Azure, 3 fleurs-de-lys Or, and in center point a bendlet couped gules. |
| | Néry | D’azur semé de fleurs de lys d’argent, au chef du même chargé d’un lambel de cinq pendants du champ. | Azure semy de lys, on a chief argent, a label of 5 points of the first. |
| | Neuville-Bosc | Parti au I d’azur au chevron d’or chargé d’un chevron de gueules, accompagné de trois gerbes de blé aussi d’or, au II de gueules aux trois lions léopardés d’argent l’un sur l’autre, le second contourné. | Azure, a chevron gules fimbriated between 3 garbs [of wheat] Or. impaled with Gules, in pale 3 lions passant argent, the second contourny. |
| | La Neuville-en-Hez | Parti : au 1) d’or au coq hardi de sable, au 2) coupé au I de gueules au château d’argent ouvert et ajouré du champ et au II de gueules à la gerbe d’or liée d’argent; le tout sommé d’un chef d’azur chargé de trois fleurs de lys d’or. | Per fess 1: Or, a cock sable; and 2: per fess I: gules, a castle argent open and pierced of the field and II: gules, a garb Or tied argent; and on a chief azure, 3 fleurs-de-lys Or. |
| | La Neuville-Garnier | de gueules au chevron d'argent accompagné de trois heaumes du même tarés de profil. | Gules, a chevron between 3 helms in profile argent. |
| | La Neuville-Roy | Ecartelé au 1er de tanné aux huit fleurs de lys d’or ordonnées 3.2.3, au deuxième de gueules aux trois maillets d’or, au troisième de gueules au lion d’argent, au quatrième d’argent fretté de gueules de douze pièces; sur le tout d’azur aux trois écrevisses d’or, celle du milieu renversée. | Quarterly, 1: tenné, 8 fleurs-de-lys Or (3,2,3); 2: Gules, 3 mallets Or; 3: Gules, a lion argent; 4: Argent fretty gules; overall, on an inescutcheon in fess 3 crayfish palewise Or, the middle one inverted. |
| | Noailles | de gueules à la bande d'or. | Gules, a bend Or. (the family Duke of Noailles and the communes of Noailles, Cuvillers, Tonnerre, Villespy, Crémarest and Vernoil-le-Fourrier use the same arms.) |
| | Nogent-sur-Oise | d'azur à la barre d'argent accompagnée, en chef, d'une fleur de chardon tigée et feuillée de deux pièces d'or et, en pointe, d'une fleur de lys du même. | Azure, a bend sinister argent between a thistle slipped and leaved and a fleur-de-lys Or. |
| | Noyers-Saint-Martin | Parti : au 1) burelé ondé d’argent et d’azur de 16 pièces, mantelé d’argent au noyer arraché au naturel posé sur la pointe du mantel, au 2) coupé au I d’argent aux trois lionceaux de gueules et au II d’azur aux trois fleurs de lys d’or. | Barry wavy argent and azure, manteled argent, a walnut tree eradicated proper ?on the base of the mantling? impaled with Per fess, argent and azure, 3 lions gules and 3 fleurs-de-lys Or. |
| | Noyon | d'argent à la fasce de gueules. | Argent, a fess gules. (the Béthune family and the communes of Cuts, Rosny-sur-Seine, Warneton and Noyon use the same arms.) |

== O ==
| Image | Name of Commune | French original blazon | English blazon |
|---|---|---|---|
| | Ons-en-Bray | D’argent au chevron d’azur accompagné de trois têtes de lions de sable. | Argent, a chevron azure between 3 lion heads sable. |
| | Orry-la-Ville | d'azur au chevron d'argent, accompagné en chef de deux étoiles d'or, au chef aussi d'argent. | Azure, a chevron argent, between in chief 2 mullets [of 5 points] Or, and a chief argent. |
| | Ormoy-Villers | accolés d’or au lion de gueules et d’azur aux trois bandes d’or. | 2 shields accolé Or, a lion gules. and Azure, 3 bends Or. |

== P ==
| Image | Name of Commune | French original blazon | English blazon |
|---|---|---|---|
| | Pierrefitte-en-Beauvaisis | accolés au premier: d’azur à trois étoiles d’argent, au chef cousu de sable; au second: aussi d'azur aux trois bandes d’argent. | 2 shields accolé: Azure, 3 mullets [of 5] argent, a chief sable. and Azure, 3 bends argent. |
| | Pierrefonds | de gueules au château du lieu d'argent, accompagné de quatre fleurs de lys d'or, ordonnées deux en chef et deux aux flancs. | Gules, the local castle argent, between 4 fleurs-de-lys, arranged 2 in chief and 2 to the sides Or. |
| | Pimprez | Parti au premier d’or au lion de sable lampassé de gueules, au second de gueules à deux houlettes d’azur enrubannées d’argent passées en sautoir, surmontés d’une étoile d’or. | Or, a lion sable, langued gules. impaled with Gules, 2 shepherd's crooks in saltire azure, ribboned argent, and in chief a mullet [of 5] gules. |
| | Pisseleu | D’argent aux trois lionceaux de gueules. | Argent, 3 lions gules. (Pisseleu, Les Trois-Moutiers, Creully use the same arms.) |
| | Plailly | D'argent à la bande d'azur chargée en coeur d'une fleur de lis d'or, en chef et en pointe de deux merlettes d'argent, le tout posé à plomb, la bande accompagnée de deux fusées d'azur. | Argent, on a bend between 2 lozenges azure, a fleur-de-lys Or between 2 martlets of the field. |
| | Le Plessier-sur-Saint-Just | d’argent au cheval cabré de sable, à la fasce de gueules chargée d’une étoile d’or brochant sur le tous, au franc canton d’azur chargé d’une épée aussi d’or. | Argent, a horse saliant sable, overall on a fess gules, a mullet [of 5] Or, and on a canton azure, a sword Or. |
| | Le Plessis-Brion | Coupé au premier de gueules au lion passant d’or surmonté de LE PLESSIS-BRION en lettres capitales de sable; au second d’or plain. | Per fess gules and Or, a lion passant Or and in chief the name "LE PLESSIS-BRION" in capital letters sable. |
| | Plessis-de-Roye | D'azur à trois fleurs de lis d'or, au bâton de gueules péri en bande. | Azure, 3 fleurs-de-lys Or, a bendlet couped gules. (Bourbon) |
| | Ponchon | de gueules au pont en dos d’ane de deux arches échiqueté d’or et d’azur, surmonté d’une colombe d’argent. | Gules, a two-arched humpbacked bridge chequy Or and azure, perched on which a dove argent. |
| | Pontpoint | mi parti : au premier de gueules aux deux léopards d’or passant l’un sur l’autre, au second d’azur aux quatre gerbes de blé d’or ordonnées 1.2.1 | Gules, 2 leopards Or. dimidiated with Azure, 4 garbs [of wheat] Or 1,2,1 |
| | Pont-Sainte-Maxence | d'or au pont de trois arches de sable sommé d'une tour du même, au chef d'azur chargé d'une salamandre d'argent sur sa patience de gueules (Croix de guerre 1914–1918) | Or, a 3-arched bridge topped with a tower sable, and on a chief azure, a salamander argent in flames gules. |
| | Précy-sur-Oise | losangé d'argent et de gueules, au chef d'or. | Lozengy argent and gules, a chief Or. |
