= Mogneville =

Mogneville refers to two places in France:

- Mogneville, Oise
- Mognéville, Meuse department
