= Beaumont-les-Nonains =

- Commune
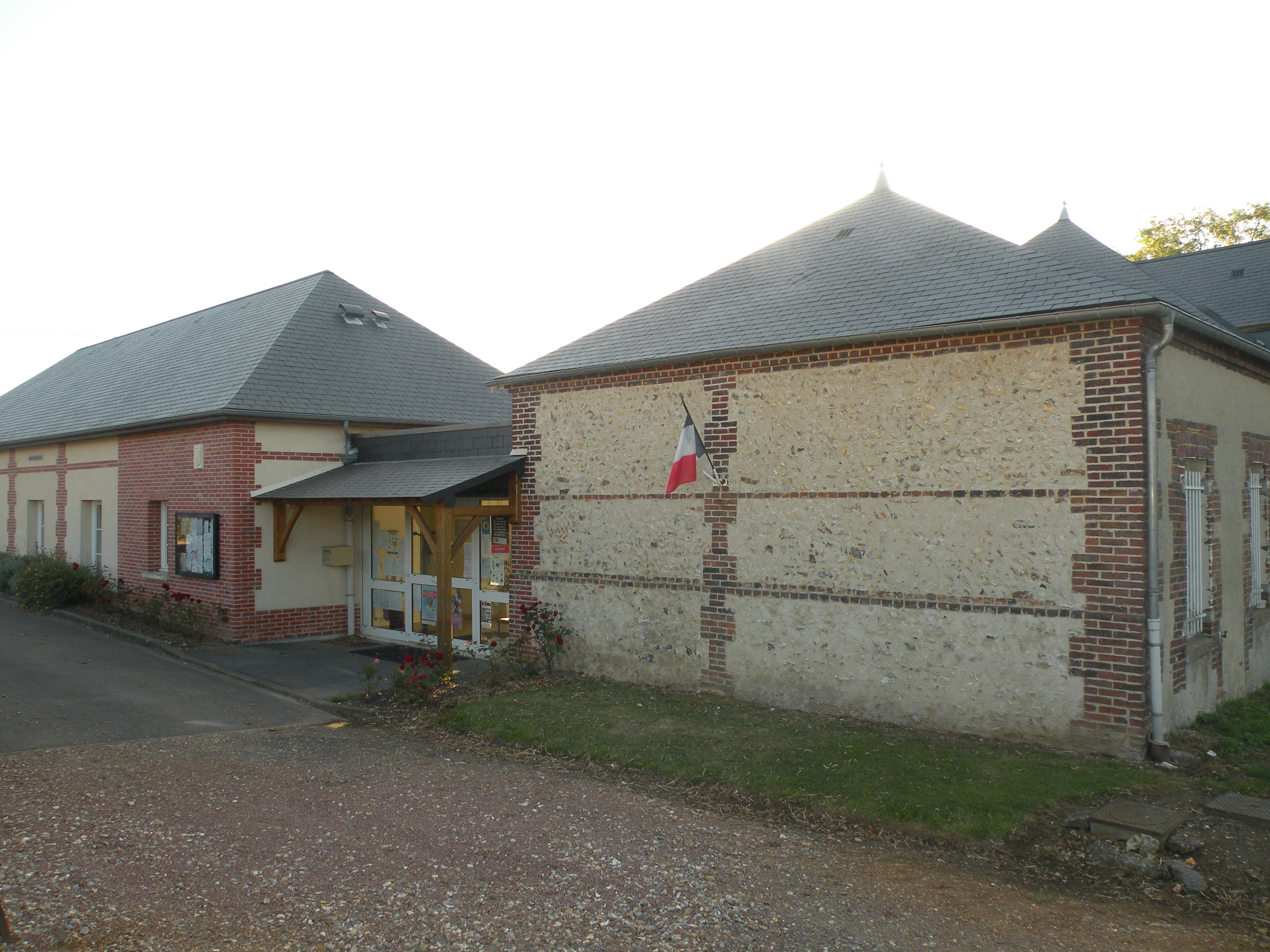
- The town hall in Beaumont-les-Nonains
- Location of Beaumont-les-Nonains
- Location within France Location within Hauts-de-France
- Coordinates: 49°19′42″N 2°00′32″E
- Country: France
- Region: Hauts-de-France
- Department: Oise
- Arrondissement: Beauvais
- Canton: Chaumont-en-Vexin

Government
  - Mayor (2024–2026): Valéry Beauvisage
- Area^{1}: 9.53 km^{2} (3.68 sq mi)
- Elevation: 183 m (600 ft)
- Highest elevation: 231 m (758 ft)
- Lowest elevation: 145 m (476 ft)
- Population (2023): 339
  - Density: 35.6/km^{2} (92.1/sq mi)
- Time zone: UTC+01:00 (CET)
  - Summer (DST): UTC+02:00 (CEST)
- INSEE/Postal code: 60054 /60390
- ^{1} French Land Register data, which excludes lakes, ponds, glaciers > 1 km^{2} (0.386 sq mi or 247 acres) and river estuaries.

Beaumont-les-Nonains (French pronunciation: [bomɔ̃ le nɔnɛ̃]) is a commune in the Oise department in northern France. On 1 January 2019, it was merged into the new commune Les Hauts-Talican. On 1 January 2024, Beaumont-les-Nonains left Les Hauts-Talican and was re-established as a commune.

== Population ==
Historical population

Year	Pop.	±% p.a.
1793	455	—
1821	514	+0.44%
1846	472	−0.34%
1872	429	−0.37%
1901	288	−1.36%
1926	251	−0.55%
1946	174	−1.82%
1962	164	−0.37%
1968	178	+1.37%

Year	Pop.	±% p.a.
1975	128	−4.60%
1982	200	+6.58%
1990	300	+5.20%
1999	322	+0.79%
2007	347	+0.94%
2012	356	+0.51%
2017	343	−0.74%
2023	339	−0.20%

Source: EHESS and INSEE (1968-2023)

== See also ==
- Communes of the Oise department
