= Adrien Vachette =

French goldsmith (1753–1839)

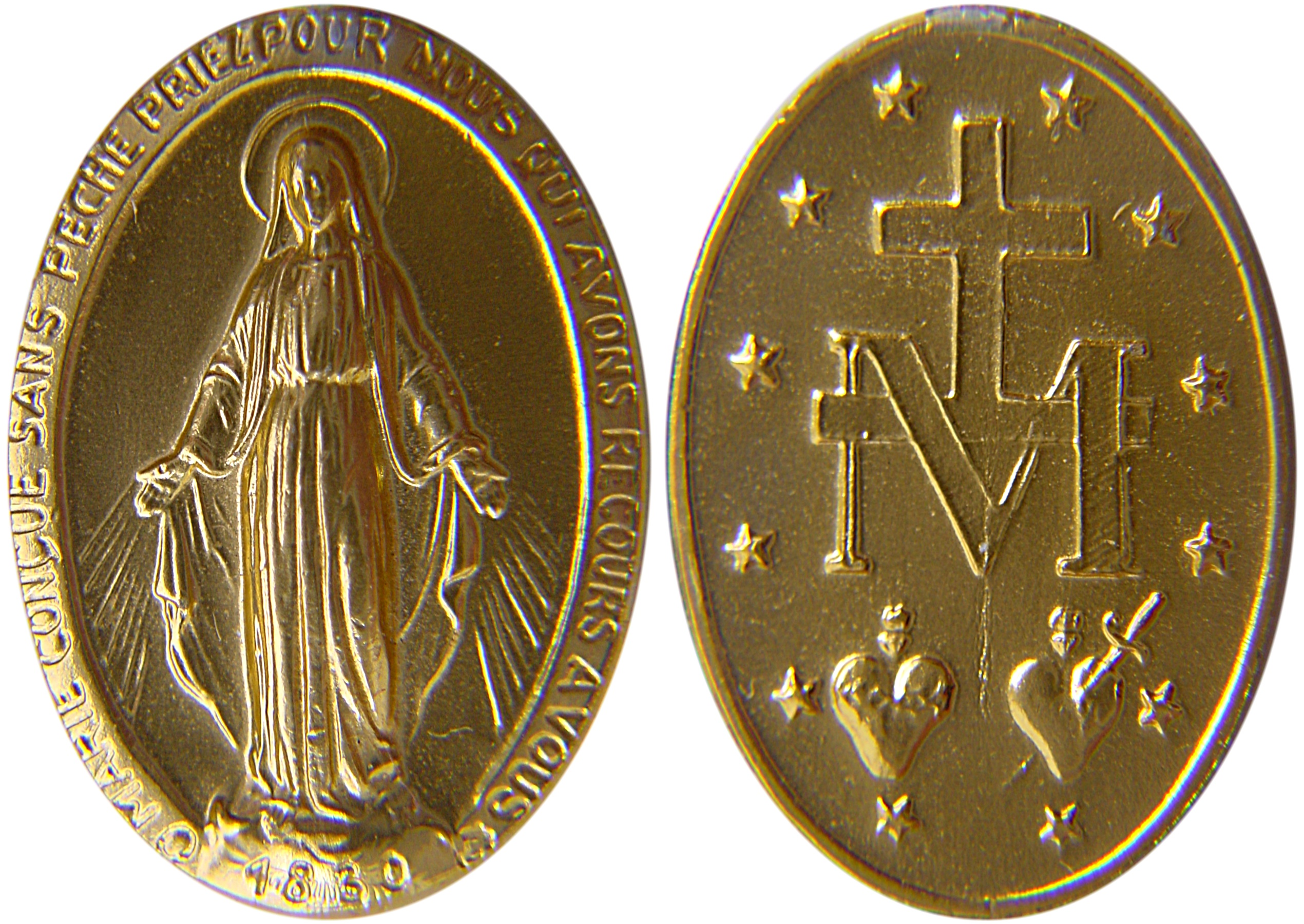
The Miraculous Medal design was executed by Adrien Vachette.

Adrien-Jean-Maximilien Vachette (born 9 January 1753 in Cauffry – deceased 23 September 1839 in Paris) was a French goldsmith best known for the production of ornate gold boxes and the use of unusual and natural materials like tortoiseshell.

== Biography ==
Adrien Vachette was born in Cauffry and possibly apprenticed with Pierre-François Drais, who sponsored him for a master's certificate 21 July 1779. He had a shop at Place Dauphine in Paris, and worked for a time with Marie-Etienne Nitot during the First Empire, and with the firm of Ouizille and Lemoine after the restoration of the monarchy: In 1816, Charles Ouizille and Adrien Vachette became the official jewellers of Louis XVIII's court.

Notable students include Jean-Valentin Morel, who apprenticed with Vachette before opening his own shop in Paris.

== Work ==
Adrien Vachette was a designer and a noted master craftsman of his generation. The use of unusual and natural materials like tortoise shell was characteristic of Vachette's work.

Vachette created the design for the Miraculous Medal, or the Medal of the Immaculate Conception, after Saint Catherine Labouré's vision of the Blessed Virgin Mary. He produced and sold over two million of the medals between 1832 and 1836.

== Collections ==
- The Louvre in Paris: 31 boxes signed by Vachette (16 from Ancien Régime, 15 from post-revolution).
- Victoria and Albert Museum in London: 1 box painted by Jacques-Joseph de Gault
- Waddesdon Manor of the Rothschild Foundation: 4 boxes
- Metropolitan Museum of Art: Cameo of the Virgin and Child and Snuffboxes
- Khalili Collection of Enamels of the World: 1 boîte à mouches

== Gallery ==
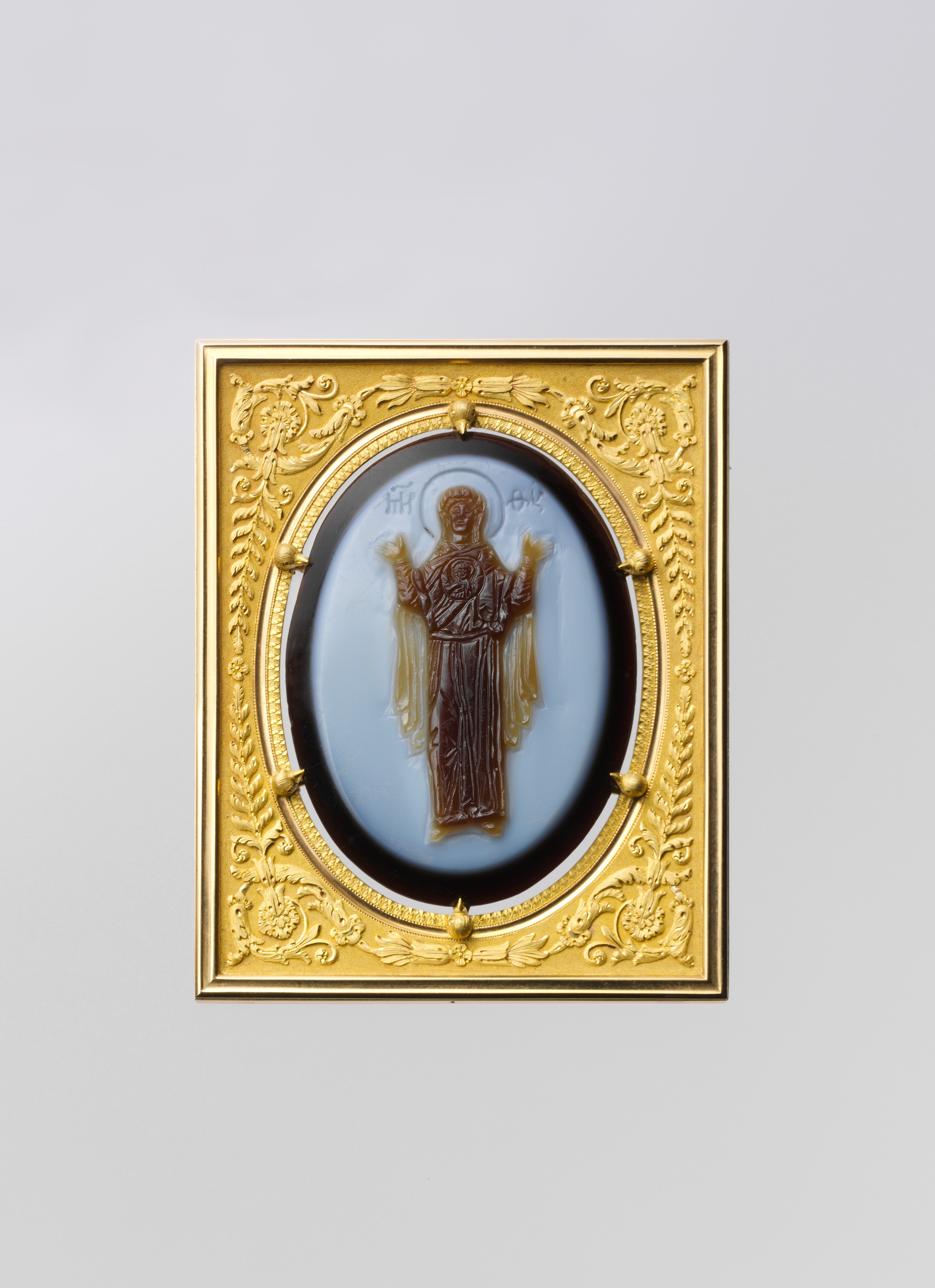
Cameo of the Virgin and Child.

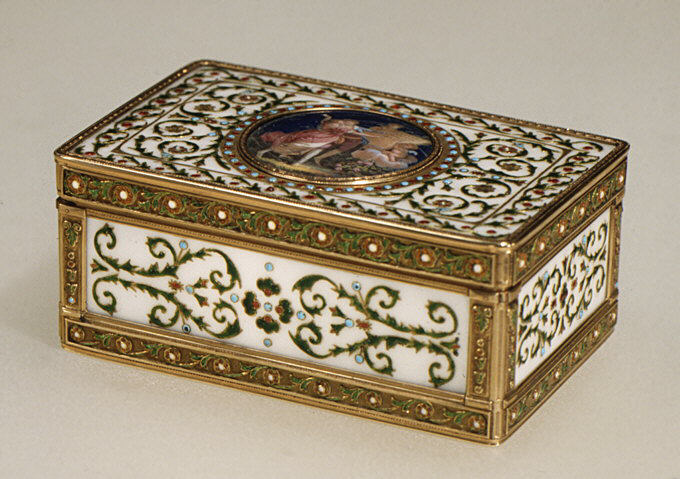
French, Paris; Snuffbox, painting; Metalwork-Gold and Platinum.

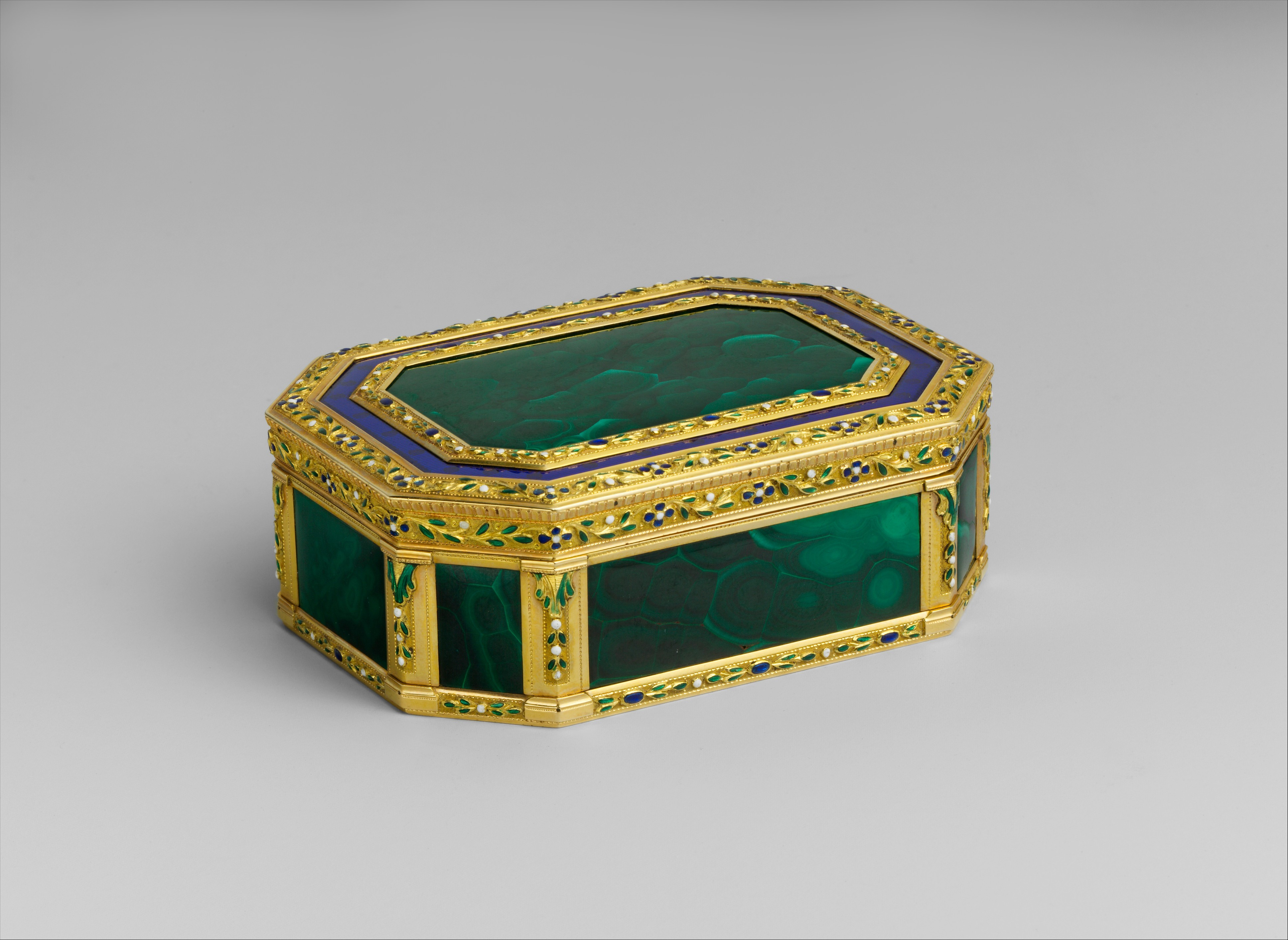
French, Paris; Snuffbox; Metalwork-Gold and Platinum.

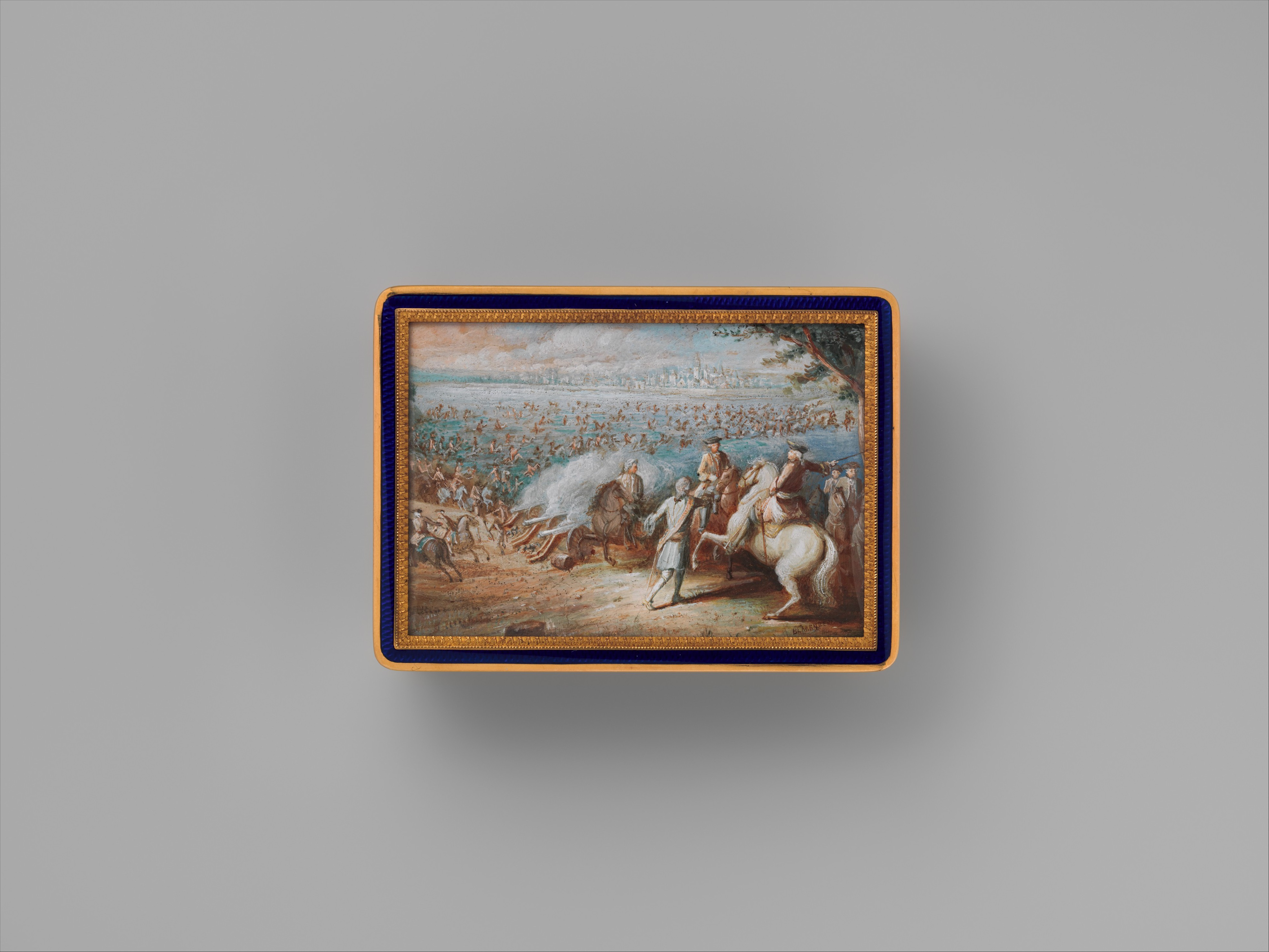
Snuffbox with four maritime scenes; Louis XIV crossing the Rhine in 1672.

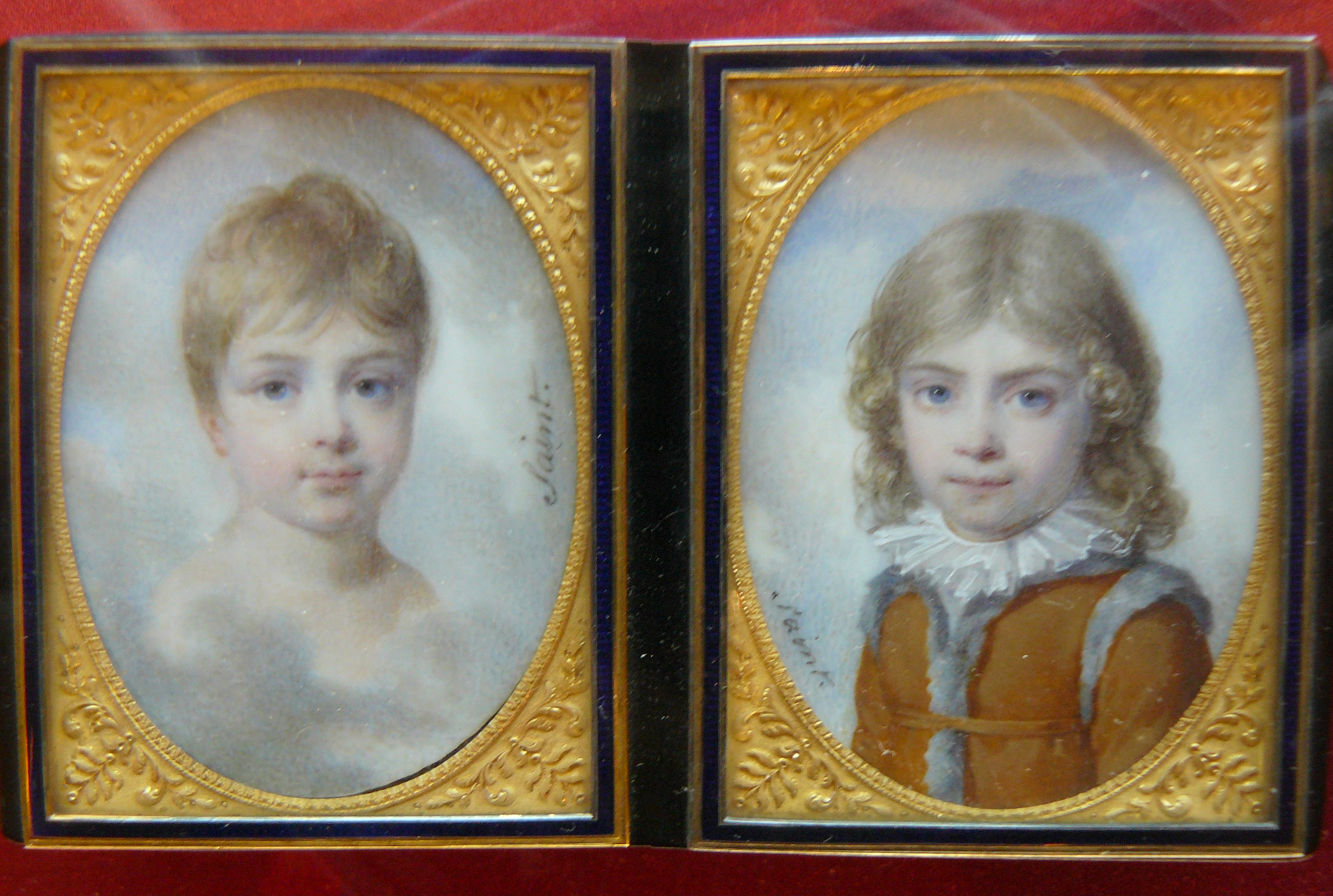
Les enfants de Lucien Bonaparte, orfèvre Adrien Vachette - Musée du Louvre.

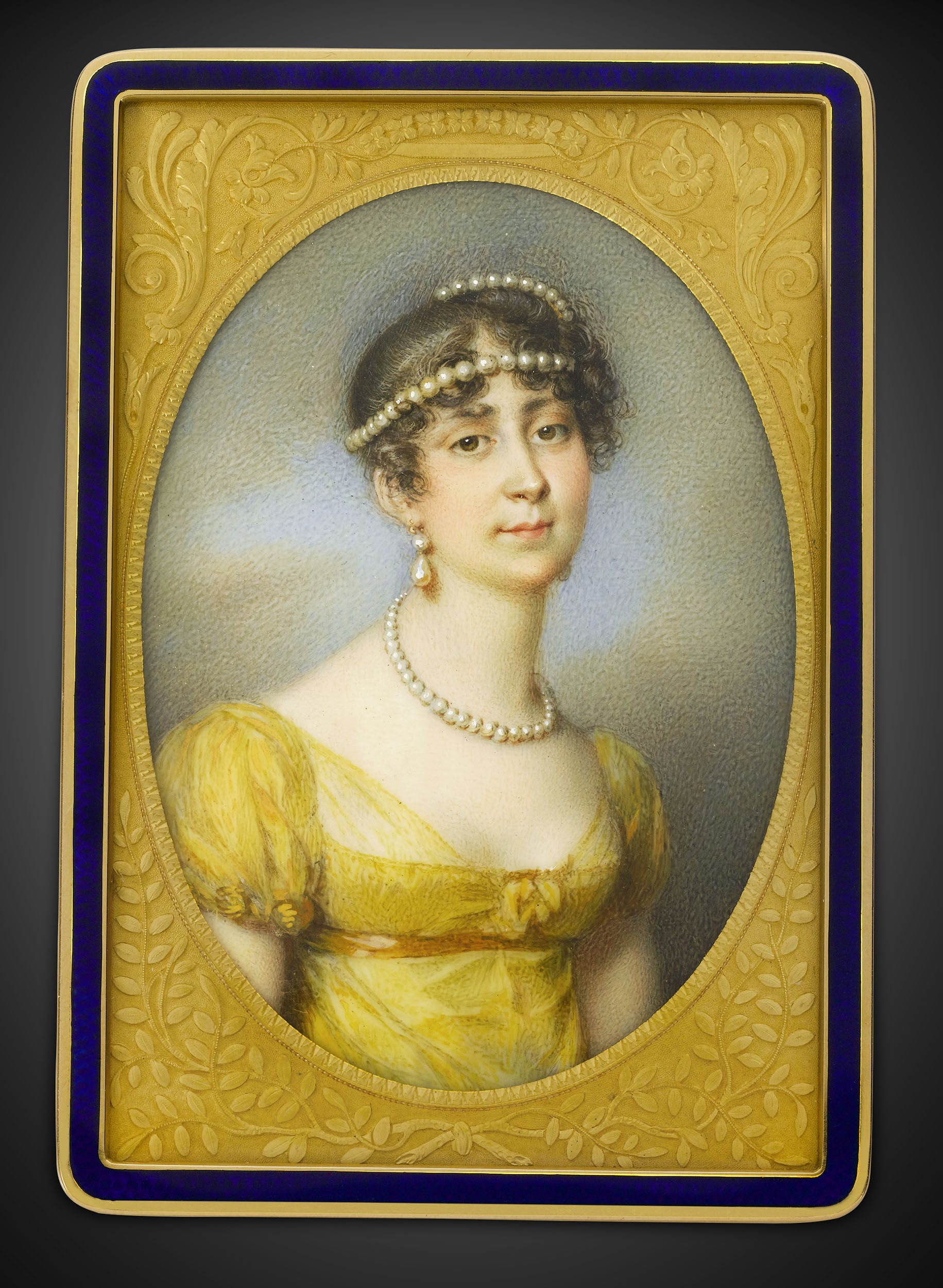
Miniature portrait of the Empress Josephine on an 18k gold snuff box, with Jean Baptiste Isabey. Circa 1810.

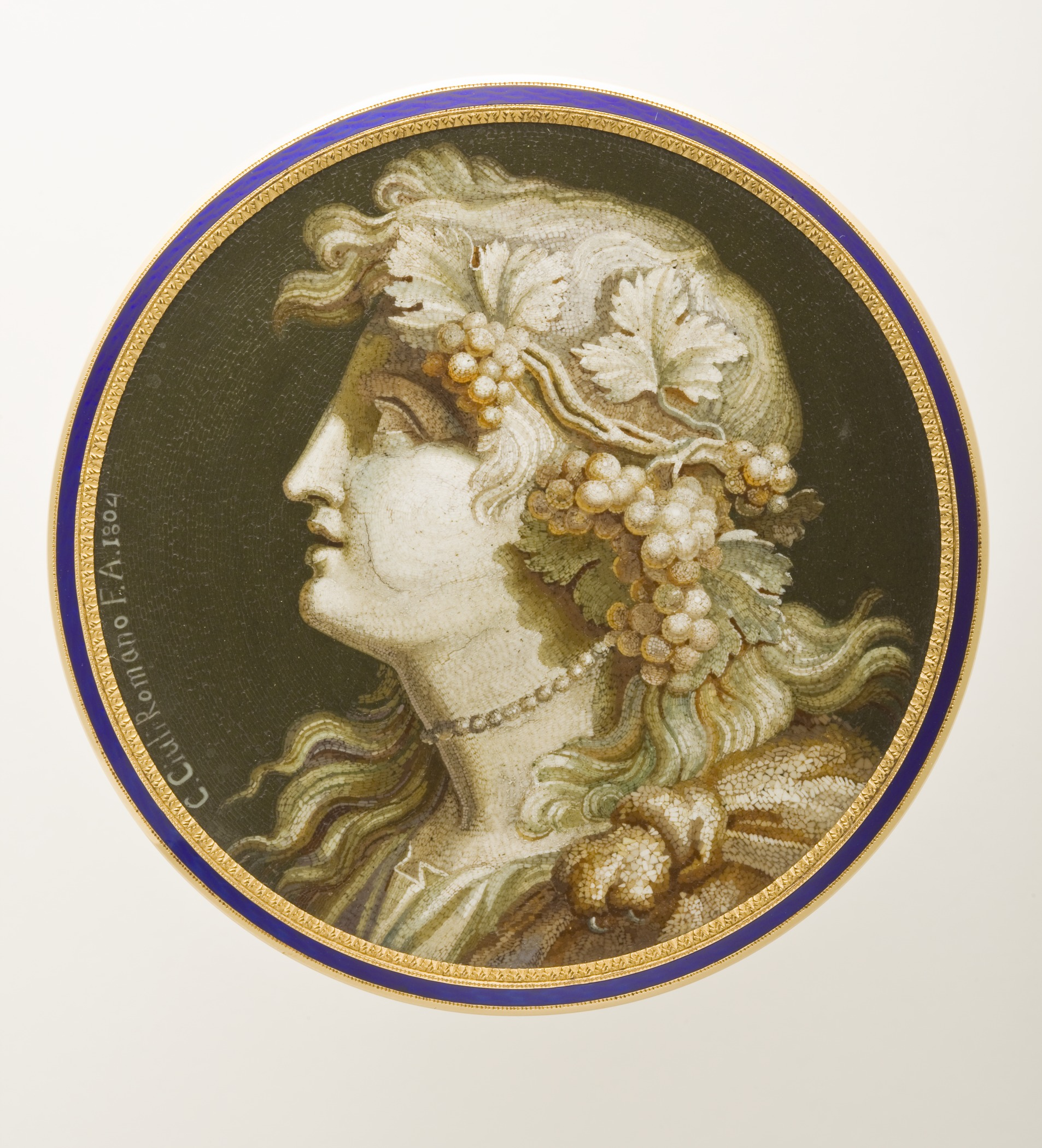
Micromosaic made in Rome, gold box made in Paris, Micromosaic 1804, box 1809–1819, with Clemente Ciuli.
