= Cauffry =

- Commune
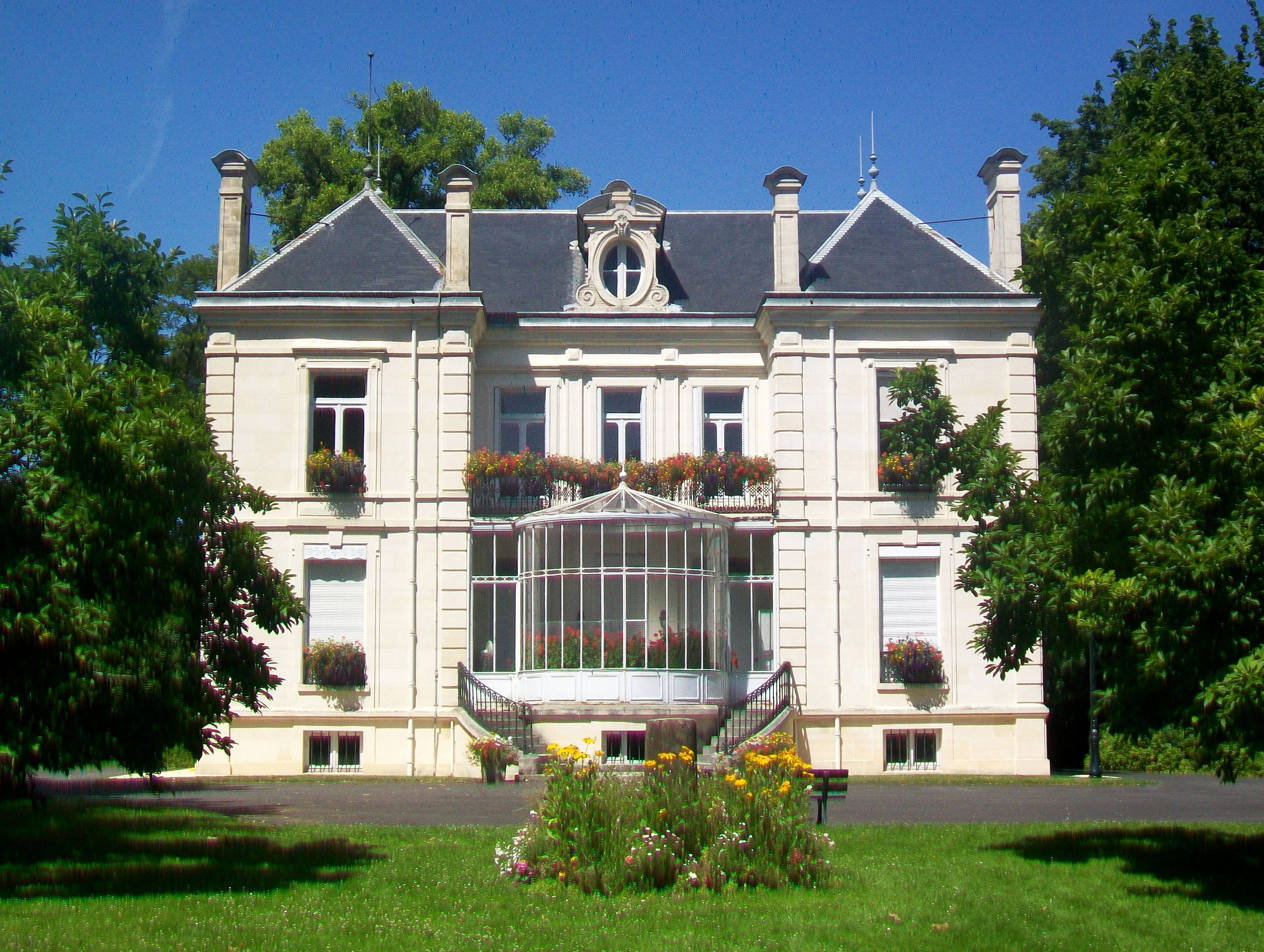
- The town hall in Cauffry
- Location of Cauffry
- Location within France Location within Hauts-de-France
- Coordinates: 49°19′03″N 2°26′57″E
- Country: France
- Region: Hauts-de-France
- Department: Oise
- Arrondissement: Clermont
- Canton: Nogent-sur-Oise
- Intercommunality: Liancourtois

Government
  - Mayor (2020–2026): Virginie Garnier
- Area^{1}: 4.74 km^{2} (1.83 sq mi)
- Elevation: 44 m (144 ft)
- Highest elevation: 114 m (374 ft)
- Lowest elevation: 36 m (118 ft)
- Population (2023): 2,649
  - Density: 559/km^{2} (1,450/sq mi)
- Time zone: UTC+01:00 (CET)
  - Summer (DST): UTC+02:00 (CEST)
- INSEE/Postal code: 60134 /60290
- ^{1} French Land Register data, which excludes lakes, ponds, glaciers > 1 km^{2} (0.386 sq mi or 247 acres) and river estuaries.

Cauffry (French pronunciation: [kofʁi]) is a commune in the Oise department in northern France.

== Population ==
Historical population
Year	Pop.	±% p.a.
1968	1,239	—
1975	1,332	+1.04%
1982	1,689	+3.45%
1990	2,137	+2.98%
1999	2,300	+0.82%
2007	2,309	+0.05%
2012	2,455	+1.23%
2017	2,540	+0.68%
2023	2,649	+0.70%
Source: INSEE

== Personalities ==
- Adrien Vachette, 19th-century goldsmith

== See also ==
- Communes of the Oise department
