= Les Hauts-Talican =

- Commune
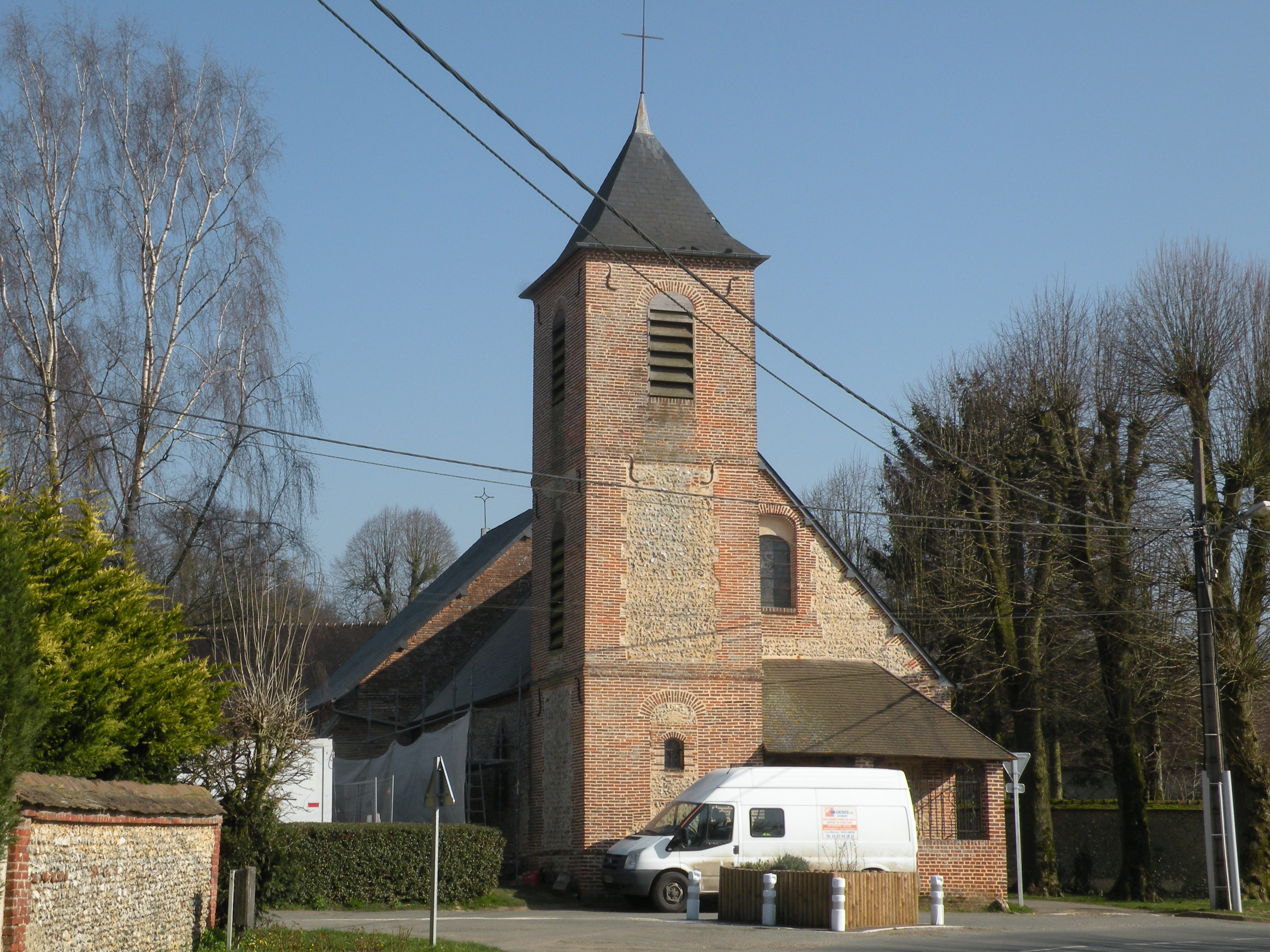
- The church in Villotran
- Location of Les Hauts-Talican
- Location within France Location within Hauts-de-France
- Coordinates: 49°19′42″N 2°00′32″E
- Country: France
- Region: Hauts-de-France
- Department: Oise
- Arrondissement: Beauvais
- Canton: Chaumont-en-Vexin
- Intercommunality: Sablons

Government
  - Mayor (2024–2026): Philippe Logeay
- Area^{1}: 13.88 km^{2} (5.36 sq mi)
- Highest elevation: 232 m (761 ft)
- Lowest elevation: 145 m (476 ft)
- Population (2023): 542
  - Density: 39.0/km^{2} (101/sq mi)
- Time zone: UTC+01:00 (CET)
  - Summer (DST): UTC+02:00 (CEST)
- INSEE/Postal code: 60694 /60390
- ^{1} French Land Register data, which excludes lakes, ponds, glaciers > 1 km^{2} (0.386 sq mi or 247 acres) and river estuaries.

Les Hauts-Talican (French pronunciation: [le o talikɑ̃]) is a commune in the Oise department in northern France. It was established on 1 January 2019 by merger of the former communes of Beaumont-les-Nonains, La Neuville-Garnier and Villotran. On 1 January 2024, Beaumont-les-Nonains left Les Hauts-Talican and was re-established as a commune.

== See also ==
- Communes of the Oise department
