= Laigneville =

- Commune
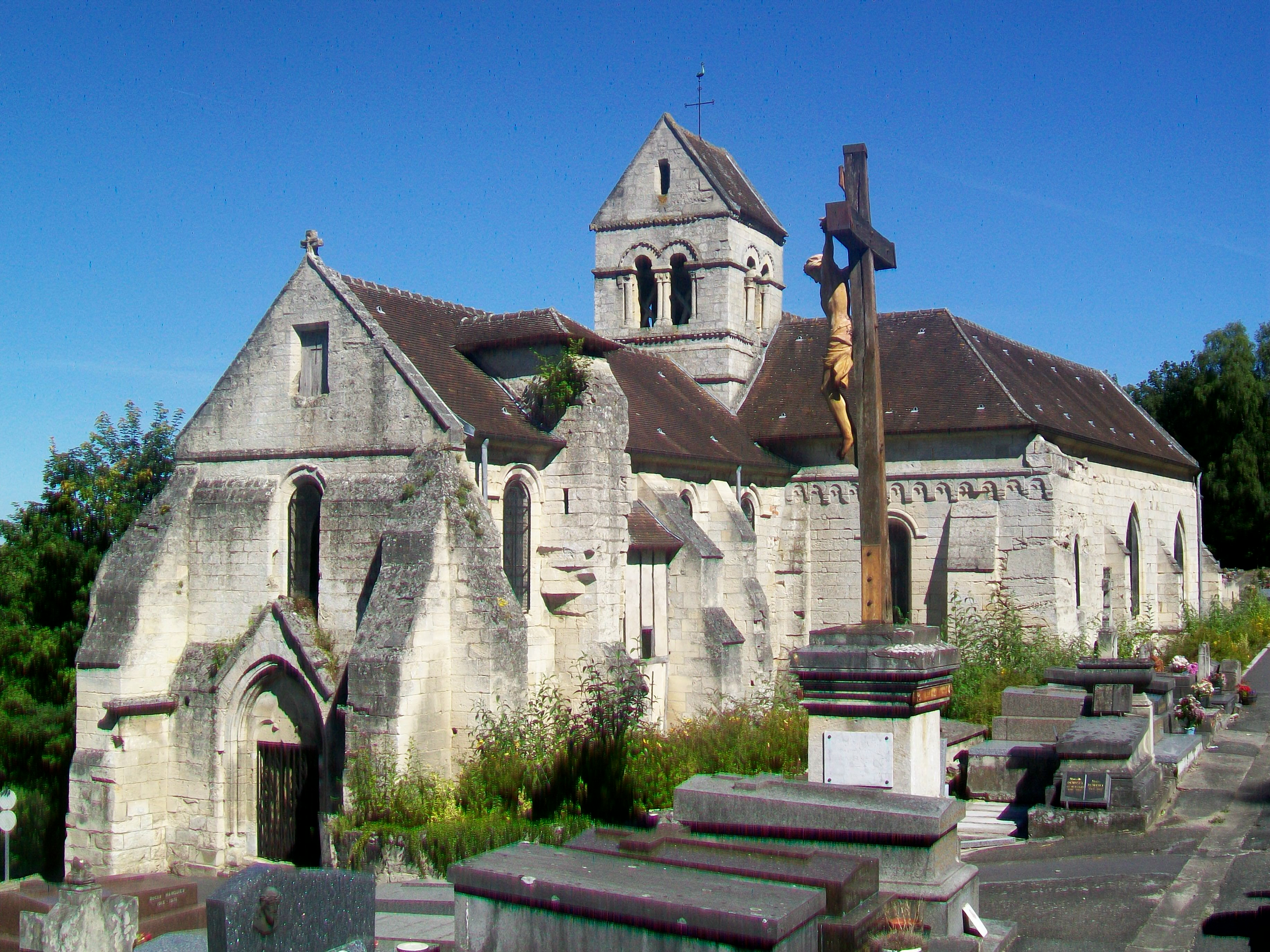
- The church in Laigneville
- Location of Laigneville
- Location within France Location within Hauts-de-France
- Coordinates: 49°17′49″N 2°26′47″E
- Country: France
- Region: Hauts-de-France
- Department: Oise
- Arrondissement: Clermont
- Canton: Nogent-sur-Oise
- Intercommunality: Liancourtois

Government
  - Mayor (2020–2026): Christophe Dietrich
- Area^{1}: 8.53 km^{2} (3.29 sq mi)
- Highest elevation: 112 m (367 ft)
- Lowest elevation: 32 m (105 ft)
- Population (2023): 4,926
  - Density: 577/km^{2} (1,500/sq mi)
- Time zone: UTC+01:00 (CET)
  - Summer (DST): UTC+02:00 (CEST)
- INSEE/Postal code: 60342 /60290
- ^{1} French Land Register data, which excludes lakes, ponds, glaciers > 1 km^{2} (0.386 sq mi or 247 acres) and river estuaries.

Laigneville (French pronunciation: [lɛɲvil]), also Laigneville-sur-Brêche, is a commune in the Oise department in northern France.

== Population ==
Historical population
Year	Pop.	±% p.a.
1968	2,367	—
1975	2,806	+2.46%
1982	2,983	+0.88%
1990	3,604	+2.39%
1999	3,789	+0.56%
2007	3,828	+0.13%
2012	4,247	+2.10%
2017	4,719	+2.13%
2023	4,926	+0.72%
Source: INSEE

== See also ==
- Communes of the Oise department
