= Villers-Saint-Paul =

- Commune
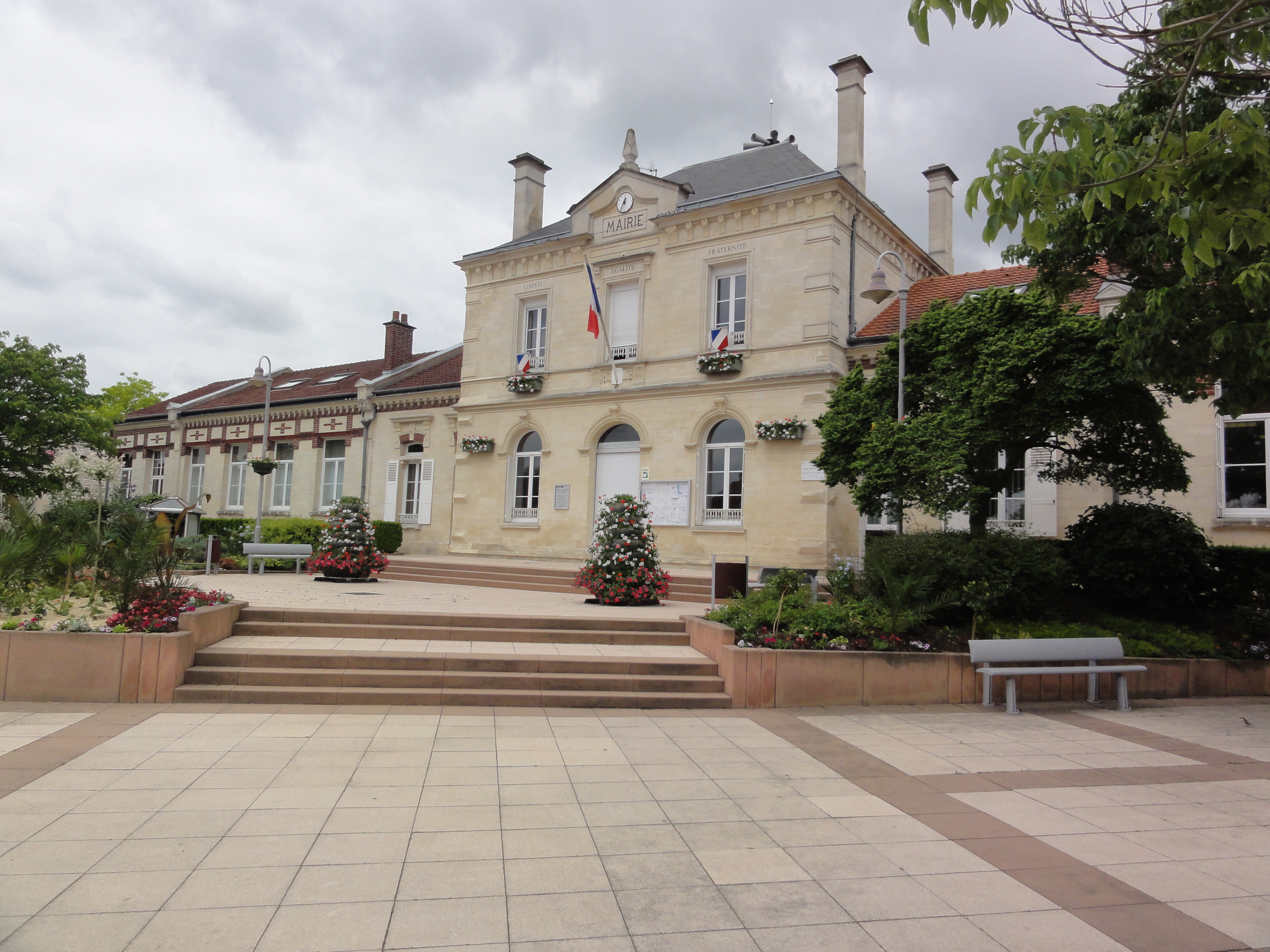
- The town hall in Villers-Saint-Paul

- Coat of arms
- Location of Villers-Saint-Paul
- Location within France Location within Hauts-de-France
- Coordinates: 49°17′23″N 2°29′17″E
- Country: France
- Region: Hauts-de-France
- Department: Oise
- Arrondissement: Senlis
- Canton: Nogent-sur-Oise
- Intercommunality: CA Creil Sud Oise

Government
  - Mayor (2020–2026): Gérard Weyn
- Area^{1}: 4.93 km^{2} (1.90 sq mi)
- Highest elevation: 117 m (384 ft)
- Lowest elevation: 26 m (85 ft)
- Population (2023): 6,480
  - Density: 1,310/km^{2} (3,400/sq mi)
- Time zone: UTC+01:00 (CET)
  - Summer (DST): UTC+02:00 (CEST)
- INSEE/Postal code: 60684 /60870
- ^{1} French Land Register data, which excludes lakes, ponds, glaciers > 1 km^{2} (0.386 sq mi or 247 acres) and river estuaries.

Villers-Saint-Paul (French pronunciation: [vilɛʁ sɛ̃ pɔl]) is a commune in the Oise department in northern France.

== Population ==
Historical population
Year	Pop.	±% p.a.
1968	3,935	—
1975	5,072	+3.69%
1982	5,545	+1.28%
1990	5,384	−0.37%
1999	5,944	+1.11%
2007	5,864	−0.17%
2012	6,378	+1.69%
2017	6,422	+0.14%
2023	6,480	+0.15%
Source: INSEE

== See also ==
- Communes of the Oise department
