= Villotran =

- Part of Les Hauts Talican
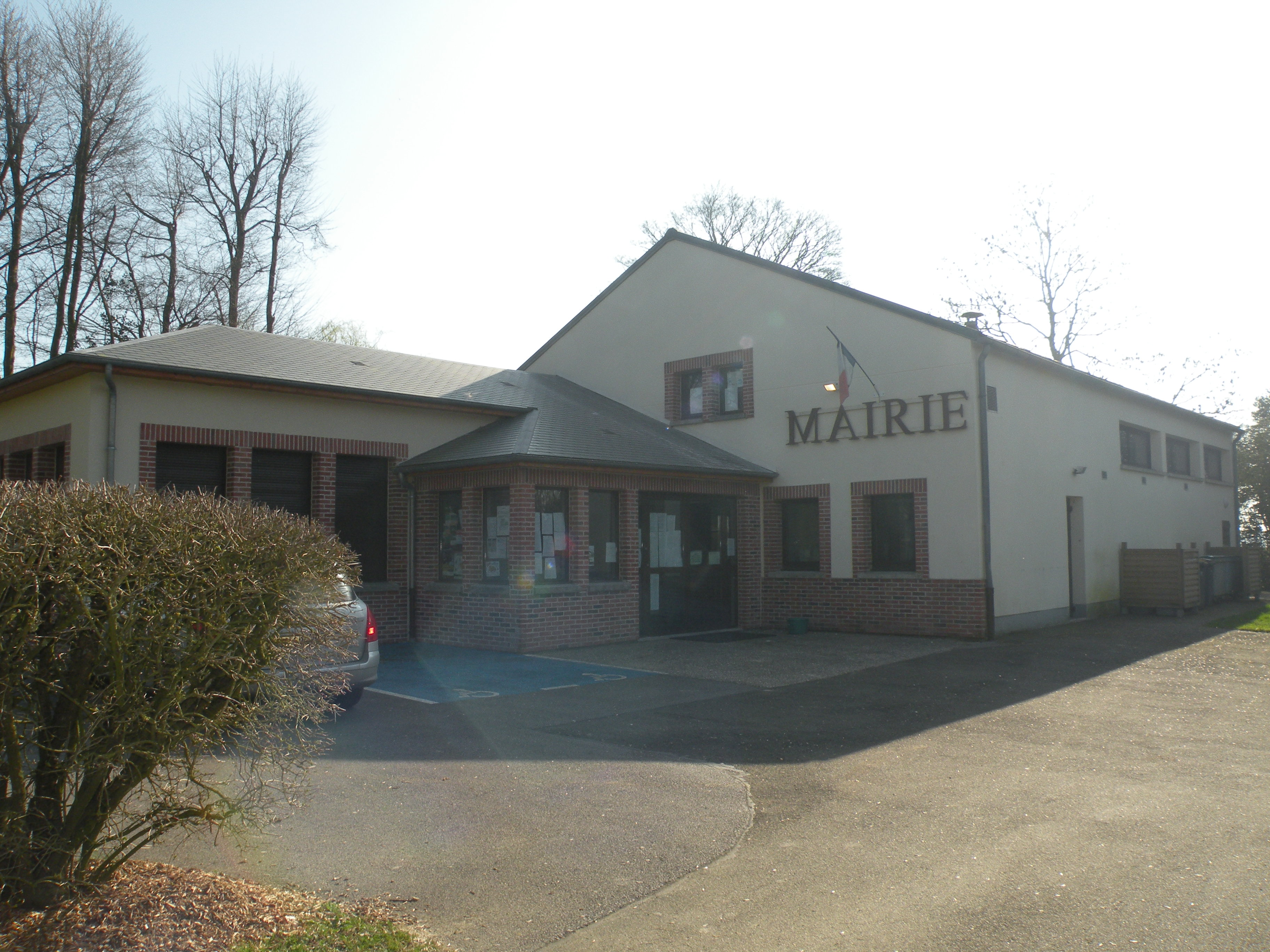
- Town hall
- Location of Villotran
- Location within France Location within Hauts-de-France
- Coordinates: 49°20′47″N 2°01′01″E
- Country: France
- Region: Hauts-de-France
- Department: Oise
- Arrondissement: Beauvais
- Canton: Chaumont-en-Vexin
- Commune: Les Hauts Talican
- Area^{1}: 5.18 km^{2} (2.00 sq mi)
- Elevation: 231 m (758 ft)
- Highest elevation: 232 m (761 ft)
- Lowest elevation: 150 m (490 ft)
- Population (2022): 291
  - Density: 56.2/km^{2} (145/sq mi)
- Time zone: UTC+01:00 (CET)
  - Summer (DST): UTC+02:00 (CEST)
- Postal code: 60390
- ^{1} French Land Register data, which excludes lakes, ponds, glaciers > 1 km^{2} (0.386 sq mi or 247 acres) and river estuaries.

Villotran (French pronunciation: [vilɔtʁɑ̃]) is a former commune in the Oise department in northern France. On 1 January 2019, it was merged into the new commune Les Hauts Talican.

== See also ==
- Communes of the Oise department
