= Hôtel de Ville, Nogent-sur-Oise =

Town hall in Nogent-sur-Oise, France

Hôtel de Ville
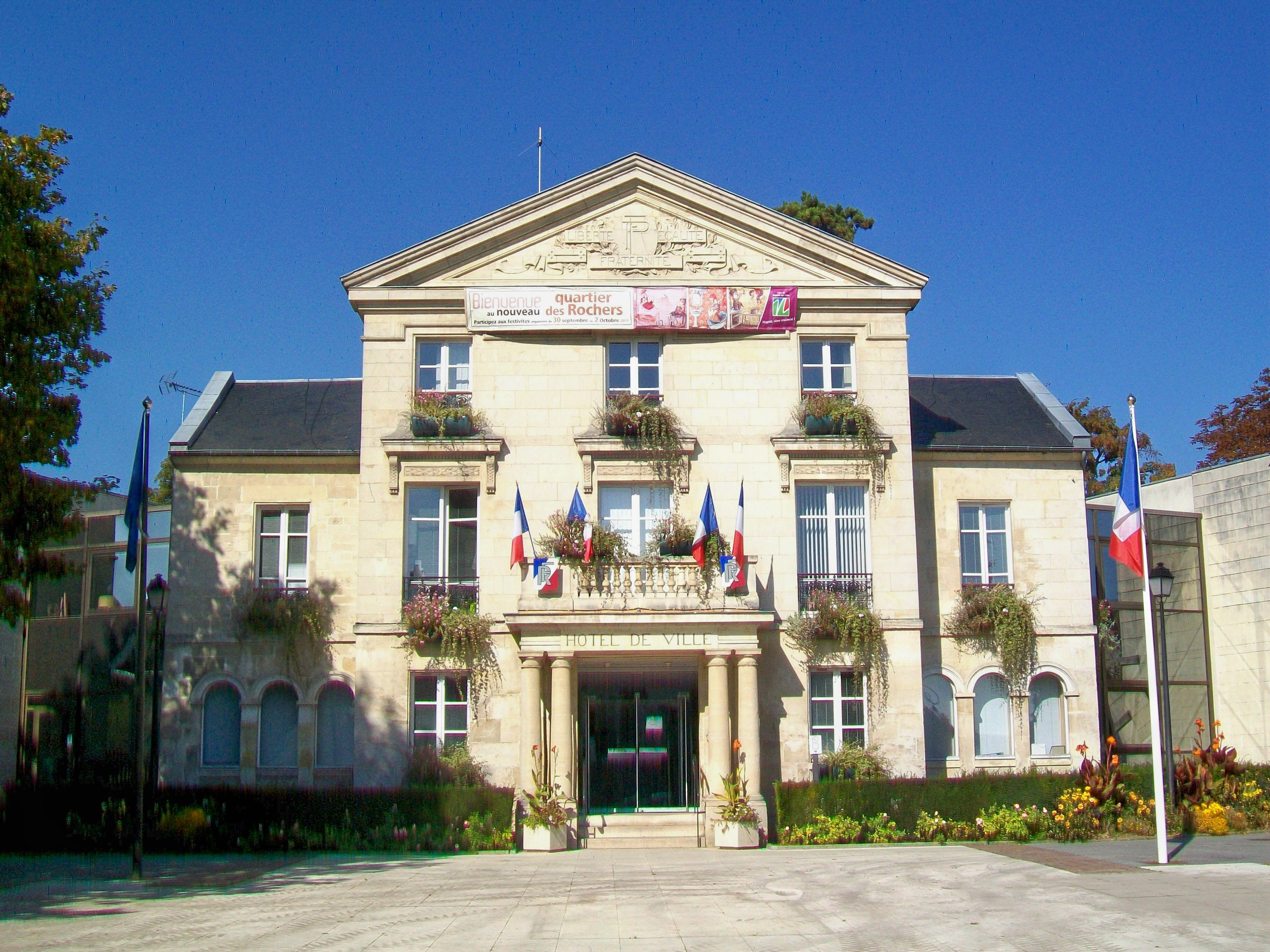
- The main frontage of the Hôtel de Ville in September 2011
- Interactive map of the Hôtel de Ville area

General information
- Type: City hall
- Architectural style: Neoclassical style
- Location: Nogent-sur-Oise, France
- Coordinates: 49.2747°N 2.4674°E
- Completed: 1822

The Hôtel de Ville (French pronunciation: [otɛl də vil], City Hall) is a municipal building in Nogent-sur-Oise, Oise, in northern France, standing on Rue du Général de Gaulle.

== History ==
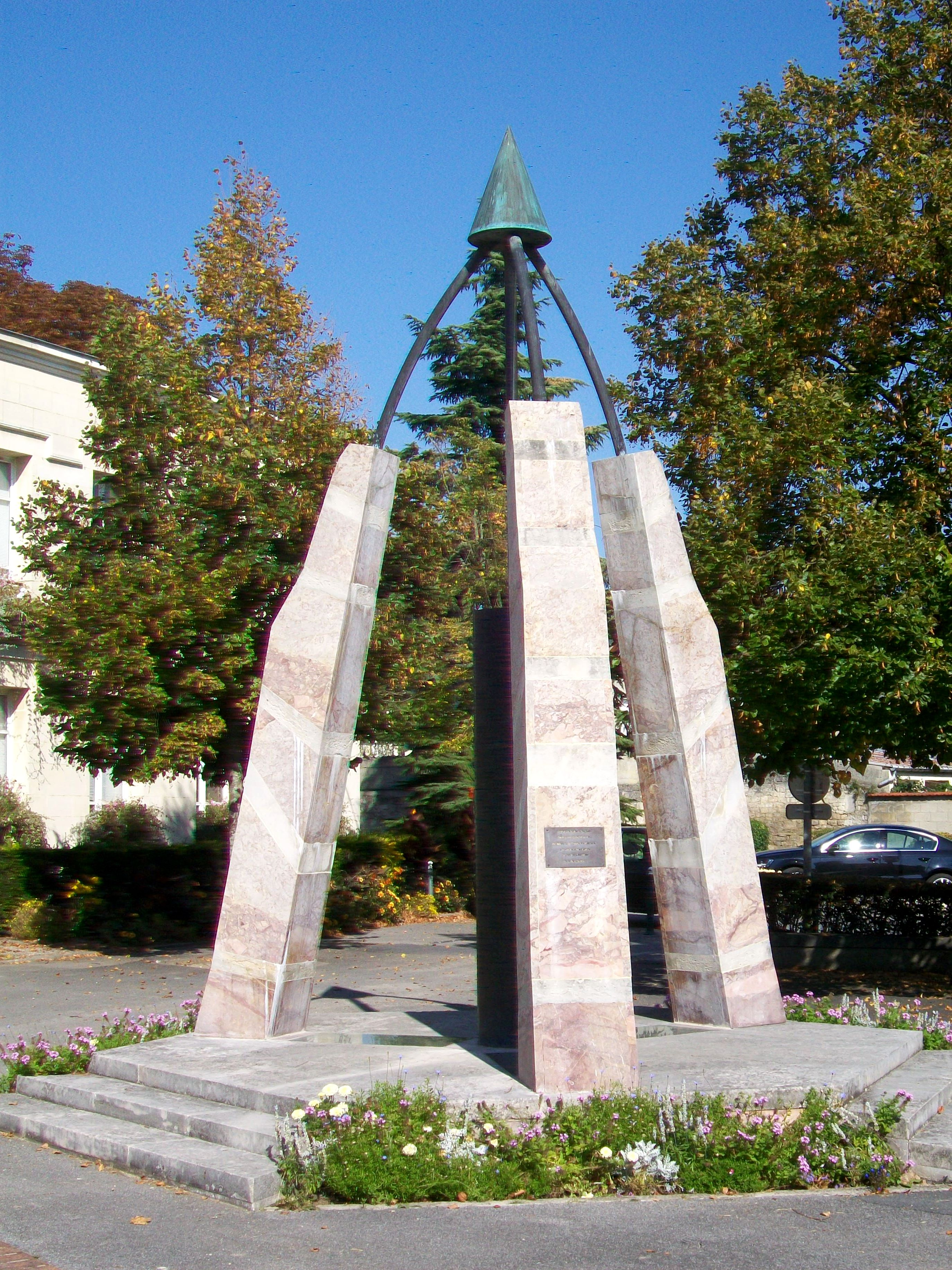
The Millennium Monument

Following the French Revolution, the new town council initially met in the house of the mayor at the time. This arrangement continued until 1867, when the council acquired a property close to the Church of Saint Maure and Saint Brigide from the owner, Sieur Bouchinet. In the early 20th century, following significant population growth, the council led by the mayor, Jules Onésime Pierrot, decided to acquire a more substantial municipal building. The property they selected was the Maison Saint-Just on the northwest side of what is now Rue du Général de Gaulle. It had been commissioned by Armand-Gustave Houbigant, who later served as mayor of the town and was the son of the perfumer Jean-François Houbigant. The house had been designed in the neoclassical style, built in ashlar stone and was completed in 1822.

The design involved a symmetrical main frontage of five bays facing onto what is now Rue du Général de Gaulle. The building was laid out as a three-storey main block, which was slightly projected forward, and a pair of two-storey wings. The central bay featured a porch formed by two pairs of Doric order columns supporting an entablature; there was a French door with a balustrade and a cornice on the first floor, and a casement window with a hood mould on the second floor. The outer bays of the main block were fenestrated by casement windows on the ground floor, by casement windows with cornices on the first floor and by casement windows with hood moulds on the second floor. The main block was surmounted by a pediment with carvings in the tympanum, and the wings were fenestrated by tri-partite round headed windows on the ground floor and by casement windows on the first floor.

The property was acquired by the council from Sieur Saint-Just in 1910. After the building had been converted for municipal use, it was officially re-opened as the town hall on 21 April 1912. It was considerably remodelled and extended between 1982 and 1986. The principal room created was the Salle du Conseil (council chamber).

A monument, created by the sculptor, Xavier Questiaux, and formed by a bronze cylinder with a cone supported by three stone columns, was created to commemorate the millennium and unveiled in front of the town hall by the mayor, Claude Brunet, on 30 December 2000. The cylinder was decorated with some 300 small plaques, each one bearing the name and the date of birth of a baby born in the town in the millennium year.
