= Canton of Nogent-sur-Oise =

Canton of France

Coordinates: 49.28°N 2.47°E

- Canton
- Situation of the canton of Nogent-sur-Oise in the department of Oise
- Country: France
- Region: Hauts-de-France
- Department: Oise
- No. of communes: {{{nbcomm}}}
- Population (2023): 39,604
- INSEE code: 6016

The canton of Nogent-sur-Oise is an administrative division of the Oise department, northern France. It was created at the French canton reorganisation which came into effect in March 2015. Its seat is in Nogent-sur-Oise.

It consists of the following communes:

1. Cauffry
2. Laigneville
3. Mogneville
4. Monchy-Saint-Éloi
5. Nogent-sur-Oise
6. Villers-Saint-Paul
