= Monchy-Saint-Éloi =

- Commune
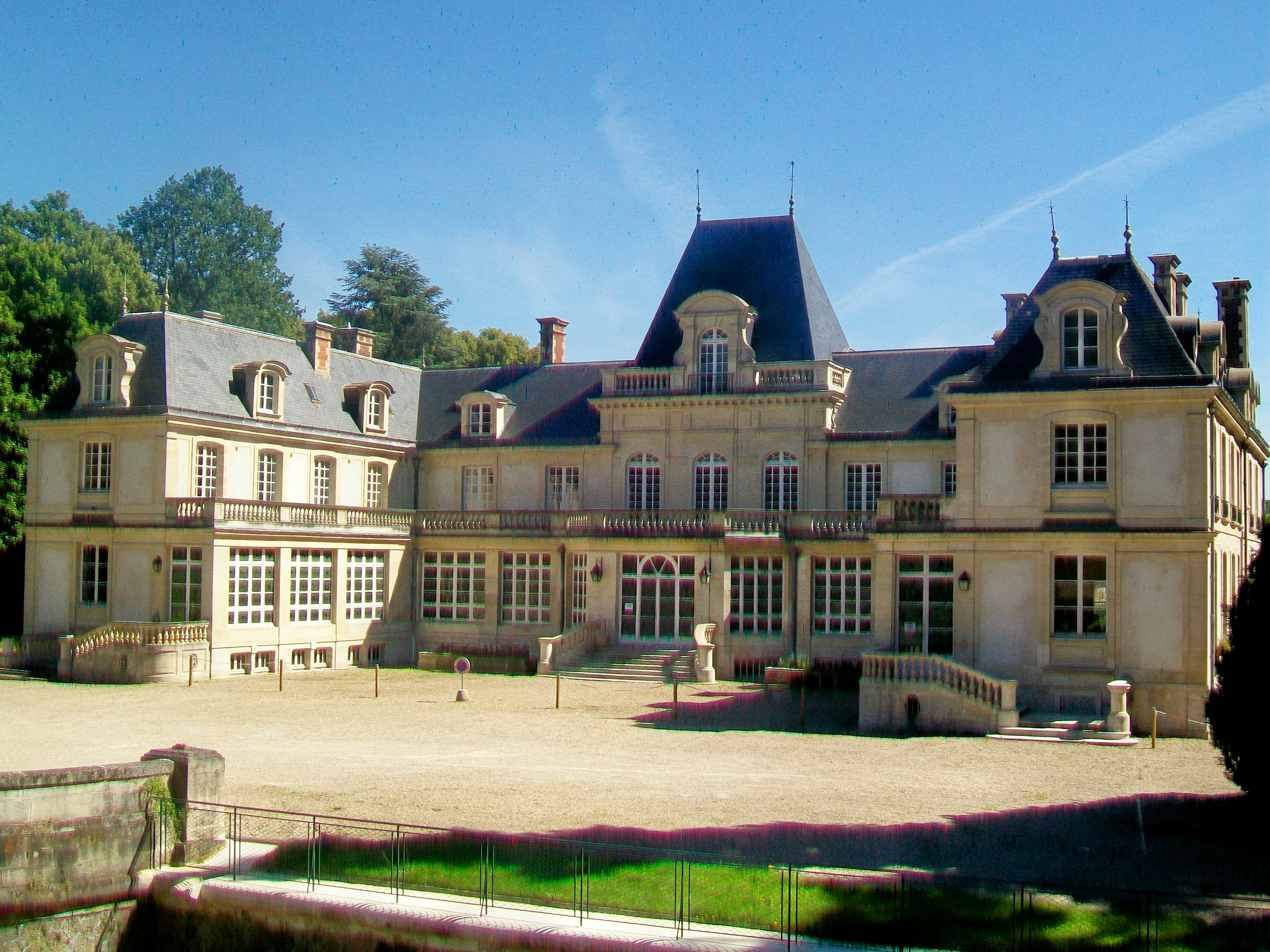
- The chateau in Monchy-Saint-Éloy
- Location of Monchy-Saint-Éloi
- Location within France Location within Hauts-de-France
- Coordinates: 49°17′27″N 2°28′05″E
- Country: France
- Region: Hauts-de-France
- Department: Oise
- Arrondissement: Clermont
- Canton: Nogent-sur-Oise
- Intercommunality: Liancourtois

Government
  - Mayor (2020–2026): Alain Boucher
- Area^{1}: 3.88 km^{2} (1.50 sq mi)
- Elevation: 37 m (121 ft)
- Highest elevation: 116 m (381 ft)
- Lowest elevation: 29 m (95 ft)
- Population (2023): 2,155
  - Density: 555/km^{2} (1,440/sq mi)
- Time zone: UTC+01:00 (CET)
  - Summer (DST): UTC+02:00 (CEST)
- INSEE/Postal code: 60409 /60290
- ^{1} French Land Register data, which excludes lakes, ponds, glaciers > 1 km^{2} (0.386 sq mi or 247 acres) and river estuaries.

Monchy-Saint-Éloi (French pronunciation: [mɔ̃ʃi sɛ̃.t‿elwa]) is a commune in the Oise department in northern France.

== Population ==
Historical population
Year	Pop.	±% p.a.
1968	928	—
1975	1,198	+3.72%
1982	1,189	−0.11%
1990	1,748	+4.93%
1999	1,889	+0.87%
2007	2,005	+0.75%
2012	2,110	+1.03%
2017	2,214	+0.97%
2023	2,155	−0.45%
Source: INSEE

== Personalities ==
It is the resting place of artist Leon Bonnat.

== See also ==
- Communes of the Oise department
