= Nogent-sur-Oise =

- Commune
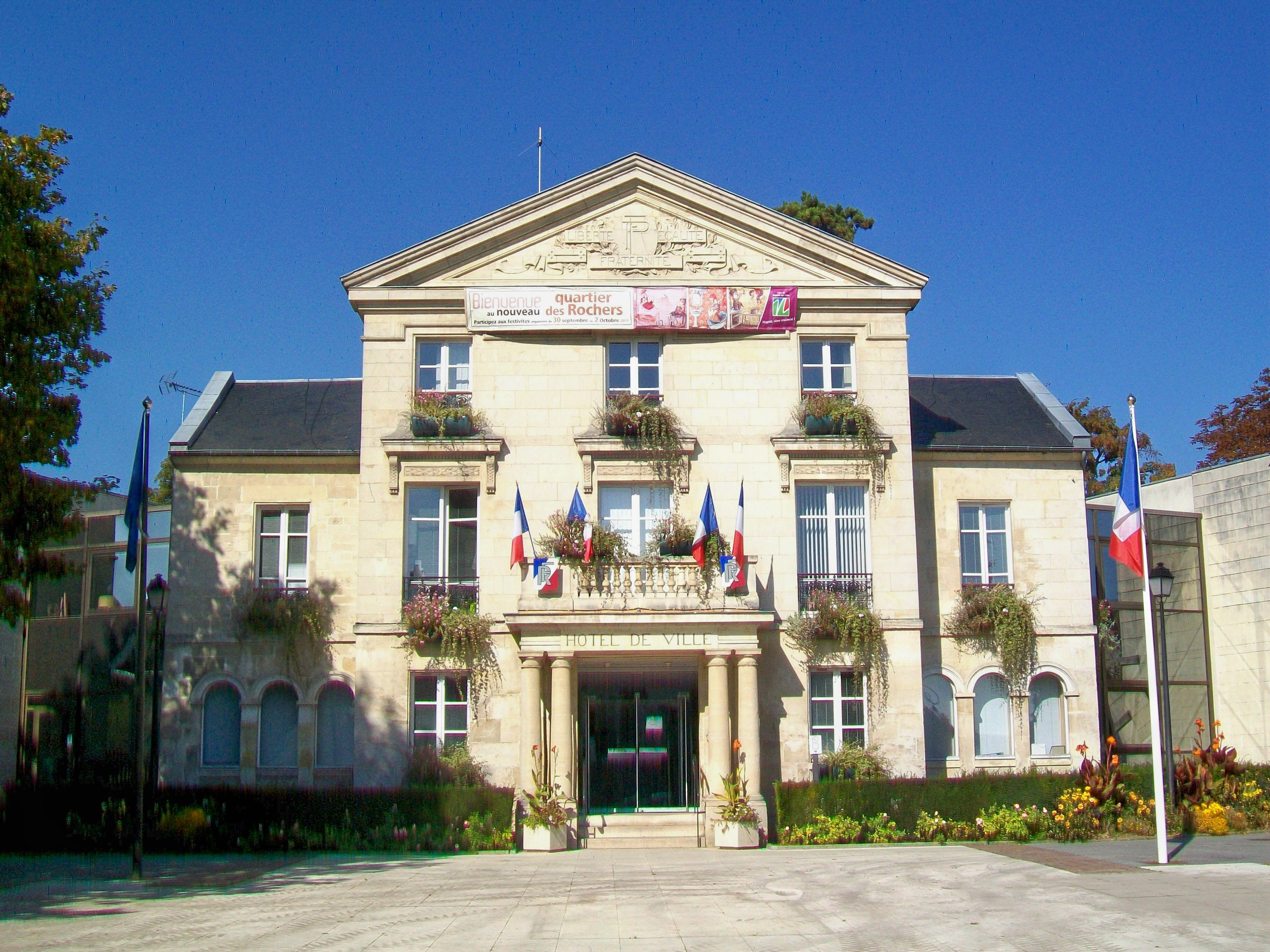
- The Hôtel de Ville

- Coat of arms
- Location of Nogent-sur-Oise
- Location within France Location within Hauts-de-France
- Coordinates: 49°16′32″N 2°28′06″E
- Country: France
- Region: Hauts-de-France
- Department: Oise
- Arrondissement: Senlis
- Canton: Nogent-sur-Oise
- Intercommunality: CA Creil Sud Oise

Government
  - Mayor (2020–2026): Jean-François Dardenne
- Area^{1}: 7.46 km^{2} (2.88 sq mi)
- Elevation: 88 m (289 ft)
- Highest elevation: 100 m (330 ft)
- Lowest elevation: 27 m (89 ft)
- Population (2023): 21,907
  - Density: 2,940/km^{2} (7,610/sq mi)
- Time zone: UTC+01:00 (CET)
  - Summer (DST): UTC+02:00 (CEST)
- INSEE/Postal code: 60463 /60180
- ^{1} French Land Register data, which excludes lakes, ponds, glaciers > 1 km^{2} (0.386 sq mi or 247 acres) and river estuaries.

Nogent-sur-Oise (French pronunciation: [nɔʒɑ̃ syʁ waz], literally Nogent on Oise; Picard: Nogint-su-Oése) is a commune in the French department of Oise, administrative region of Hauts-de-France (Picardy as former region). It lies adjacent to the north of the larger town Creil.

== History ==
The Hôtel de Ville was completed in 1822.

On 29 January 1893, the Ortiz gang committed a burglary in the town.

== Population ==
Historical population

Year	Pop.	±% p.a.
1793	435	—
1800	503	+2.10%
1806	612	+3.32%
1821	631	+0.20%
1831	728	+1.44%
1836	737	+0.25%
1841	714	−0.63%
1846	830	+3.06%
1851	892	+1.45%
1856	1,003	+2.37%
1861	1,068	+1.26%
1866	1,286	+3.78%
1872	1,407	+1.51%
1876	1,571	+2.79%
1881	1,850	+3.32%
1886	2,169	+3.23%
1891	2,627	+3.91%
1896	3,076	+3.21%
1901	3,545	+2.88%

Year	Pop.	±% p.a.
1906	4,178	+3.34%
1911	4,841	+2.99%
1921	5,556	+1.39%
1926	5,851	+1.04%
1931	6,417	+1.86%
1936	6,416	−0.00%
1946	6,458	+0.07%
1954	7,718	+2.25%
1962	8,808	+1.67%
1968	11,506	+4.55%
1975	15,680	+4.52%
1982	16,980	+1.14%
1990	19,537	+1.77%
1999	19,151	−0.22%
2007	19,674	+0.34%
2012	18,713	−1.00%
2017	20,033	+1.37%
2023	21,907	+1.50%

Source: EHESS and INSEE (1968-2023)

== International relationships ==
Nogent-sur-Oise is twinned with:

- Gersthofen, Bavaria, Germany since 1969
- Beverley, United Kingdom since 1998
- Aida Camp, Palestine since 2009
- Fucecchio, Tuscany, Italy since 2014

In Kraśnik as a reaction to the passing of an anti-LGBT resolution by the Kraśnik local authorities. In April 2021, the controversial resolution was repealed by the town council.

== In popular culture ==
Nogent-sur-Oise is the town where the character Jacob once lived with his family in the Newbery Honor-winning book The Inquisitor's Tale. Half the village was burned down by Christian boys on a dare.

== See also ==
- Communes of the Oise department
