= Margny-sur-Matz =

- Commune
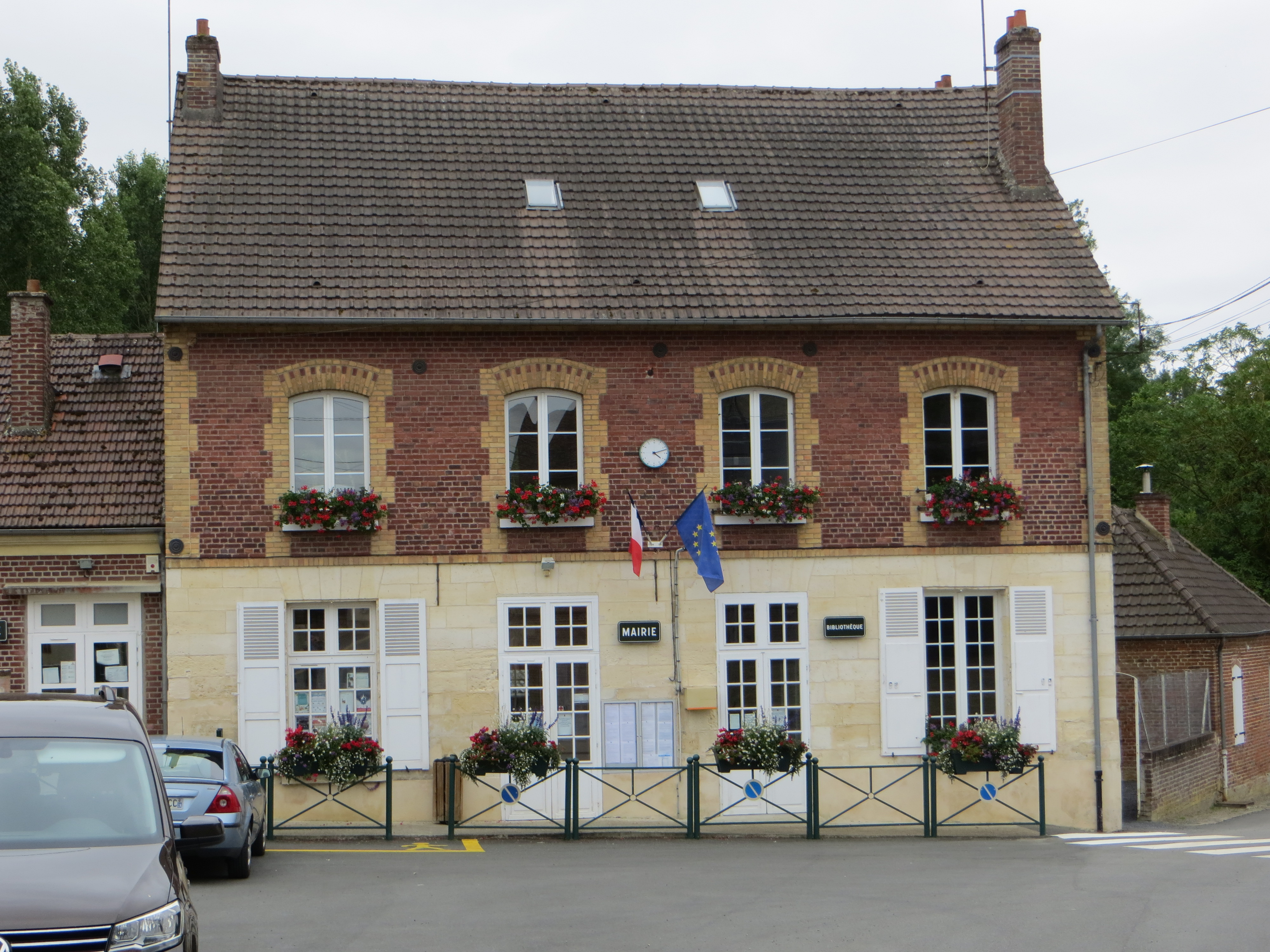
- Margny-sur-Matz Town hall

- Coat of arms
- Location of Margny-sur-Matz
- Location within France Location within Hauts-de-France
- Coordinates: 49°31′23″N 2°46′47″E
- Country: France
- Region: Hauts-de-France
- Department: Oise
- Arrondissement: Compiègne
- Canton: Estrées-Saint-Denis
- Intercommunality: Pays des Sources

Government
  - Mayor (2020–2026): Baptiste de Fresse de Monval
- Area^{1}: 7.24 km^{2} (2.80 sq mi)
- Elevation: 67 m (220 ft)
- Highest elevation: 186 m (610 ft)
- Lowest elevation: 42 m (138 ft)
- Population (2023): 531
  - Density: 73.3/km^{2} (190/sq mi)
- Time zone: UTC+01:00 (CET)
  - Summer (DST): UTC+02:00 (CEST)
- INSEE/Postal code: 60383 /60490
- ^{1} French Land Register data, which excludes lakes, ponds, glaciers > 1 km^{2} (0.386 sq mi or 247 acres) and river estuaries.

Margny-sur-Matz (French pronunciation: [maʁɲi syʁ ma]) is a commune in the Oise department in northern France.

== See also ==
- Communes of the Oise department
