= La Neuville-Garnier =

- Part of Les Hauts Talican
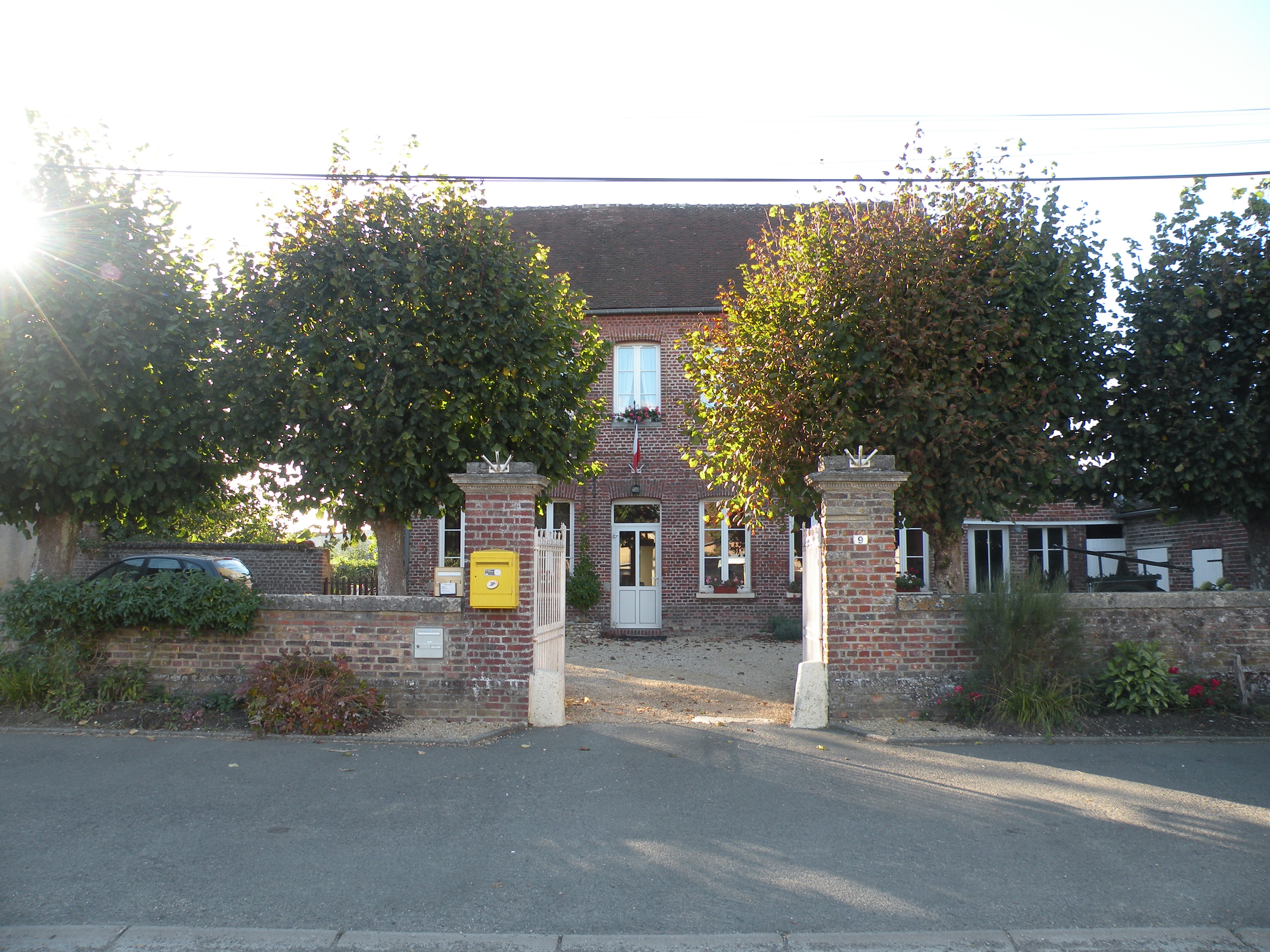
- Town hall

- Coat of arms
- Location of La Neuville-Garnier
- Location within France Location within Hauts-de-France
- Coordinates: 49°20′00″N 2°02′27″E
- Country: France
- Region: Hauts-de-France
- Department: Oise
- Arrondissement: Beauvais
- Canton: Chaumont-en-Vexin
- Commune: Les Hauts Talican
- Area^{1}: 7.85 km^{2} (3.03 sq mi)
- Highest elevation: 232 m (761 ft)
- Lowest elevation: 145 m (476 ft)
- Population (2022): 256
  - Density: 32.6/km^{2} (84.5/sq mi)
- Time zone: UTC+01:00 (CET)
  - Summer (DST): UTC+02:00 (CEST)
- Postal code: 60390
- ^{1} French Land Register data, which excludes lakes, ponds, glaciers > 1 km^{2} (0.386 sq mi or 247 acres) and river estuaries.

La Neuville-Garnier (French pronunciation: [la nøvil ɡaʁnje]) is a former commune in the Oise department in northern France. On 1 January 2019, it was merged into the new commune Les Hauts Talican.

== See also ==
- Communes of the Oise department
