= Pisseleu =

- Commune
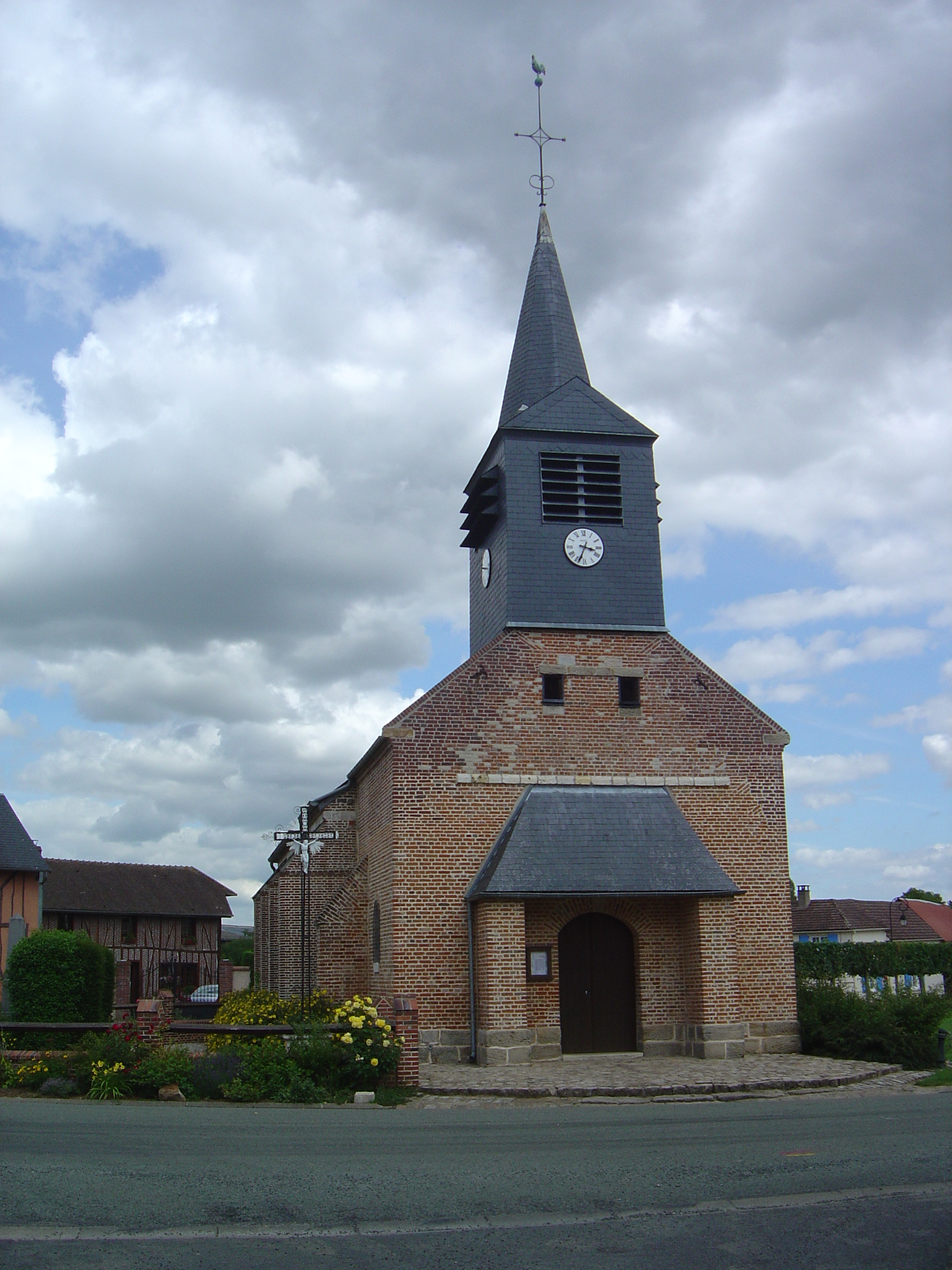
- The church in Pisseleu

- Coat of arms
- Location of Pisseleu
- Location within France Location within Hauts-de-France
- Coordinates: 49°32′22″N 2°03′39″E
- Country: France
- Region: Hauts-de-France
- Department: Oise
- Arrondissement: Beauvais
- Canton: Grandvilliers
- Intercommunality: Picardie Verte

Government
  - Mayor (2020–2026): Philippe Smessaert
- Area^{1}: 2.88 km^{2} (1.11 sq mi)
- Elevation: 172 m (564 ft)
- Highest elevation: 173 m (568 ft)
- Lowest elevation: 142 m (466 ft)
- Population (2023): 519
  - Density: 180/km^{2} (467/sq mi)
- Time zone: UTC+01:00 (CET)
  - Summer (DST): UTC+02:00 (CEST)
- INSEE/Postal code: 60493 /60860
- ^{1} French Land Register data, which excludes lakes, ponds, glaciers > 1 km^{2} (0.386 sq mi or 247 acres) and river estuaries.

Pisseleu (French pronunciation: [pislø]) is a commune in the Oise department in northern France.

== See also ==
- Communes of the Oise department
