= Le Mesnil-Théribus =

- Commune
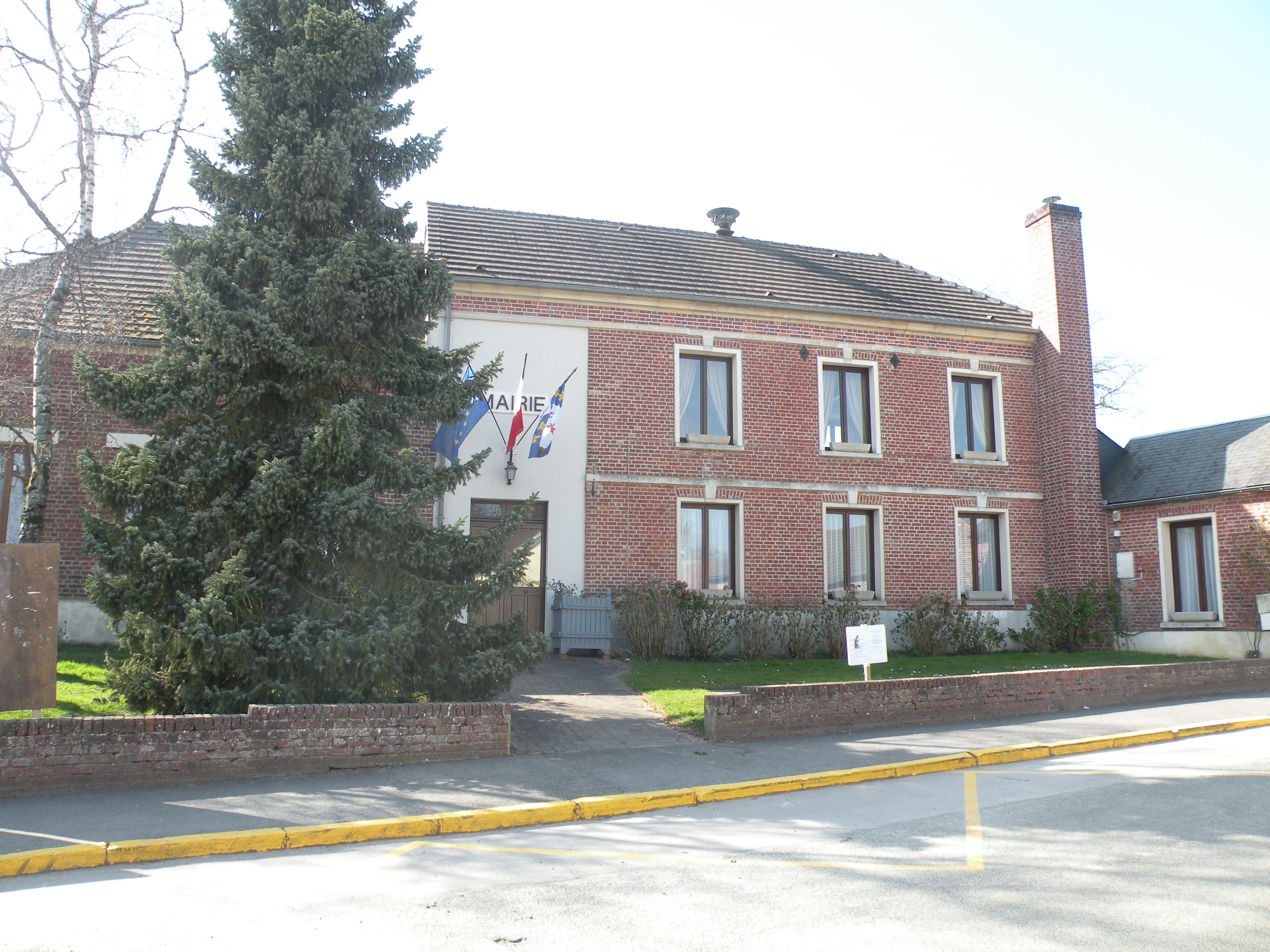
- The town hall in Le Mesnil-Théribus

- Coat of arms
- Location of Le Mesnil-Théribus
- Location within France Location within Hauts-de-France
- Coordinates: 49°18′06″N 1°59′16″E
- Country: France
- Region: Hauts-de-France
- Department: Oise
- Arrondissement: Beauvais
- Canton: Chaumont-en-Vexin

Government
  - Mayor (2020–2026): Carole Delande
- Area^{1}: 6.61 km^{2} (2.55 sq mi)
- Elevation: 180 m (590 ft)
- Highest elevation: 198 m (650 ft)
- Lowest elevation: 119 m (390 ft)
- Population (2023): 770
  - Density: 120/km^{2} (300/sq mi)
- Time zone: UTC+01:00 (CET)
  - Summer (DST): UTC+02:00 (CEST)
- INSEE/Postal code: 60401 /60240
- ^{1} French Land Register data, which excludes lakes, ponds, glaciers > 1 km^{2} (0.386 sq mi or 247 acres) and river estuaries.

Le Mesnil-Théribus (French pronunciation: [lə menil teʁiby]) is a commune in the Oise department in northern France.

== Notable Locations ==
Le Mesnil-Théribus is home to the Eglise Saint-Léger church.

== See also ==
- Communes of the Oise department
- Picardy
