= Marquéglise =

- Commune
- Coat of arms
- Location of Marquéglise
- Location within France Location within Hauts-de-France
- Coordinates: 49°31′02″N 2°45′51″E
- Country: France
- Region: Hauts-de-France
- Department: Oise
- Arrondissement: Compiègne
- Canton: Estrées-Saint-Denis
- Intercommunality: Pays des Sources

Government
  - Mayor (2020–2026): Guillaume Pinel
- Area^{1}: 6.76 km^{2} (2.61 sq mi)
- Elevation: 73 m (240 ft)
- Highest elevation: 114 m (374 ft)
- Lowest elevation: 47 m (154 ft)
- Population (2023): 484
  - Density: 71.6/km^{2} (185/sq mi)
- Time zone: UTC+01:00 (CET)
  - Summer (DST): UTC+02:00 (CEST)
- INSEE/Postal code: 60386 /60490
- ^{1} French Land Register data, which excludes lakes, ponds, glaciers > 1 km^{2} (0.386 sq mi or 247 acres) and river estuaries.

Marquéglise (French pronunciation: [maʁkeɡliz]) is a commune in the Oise department in northern France.

== See also ==
- Communes of the Oise department
