= Montagny-en-Vexin =

- Commune
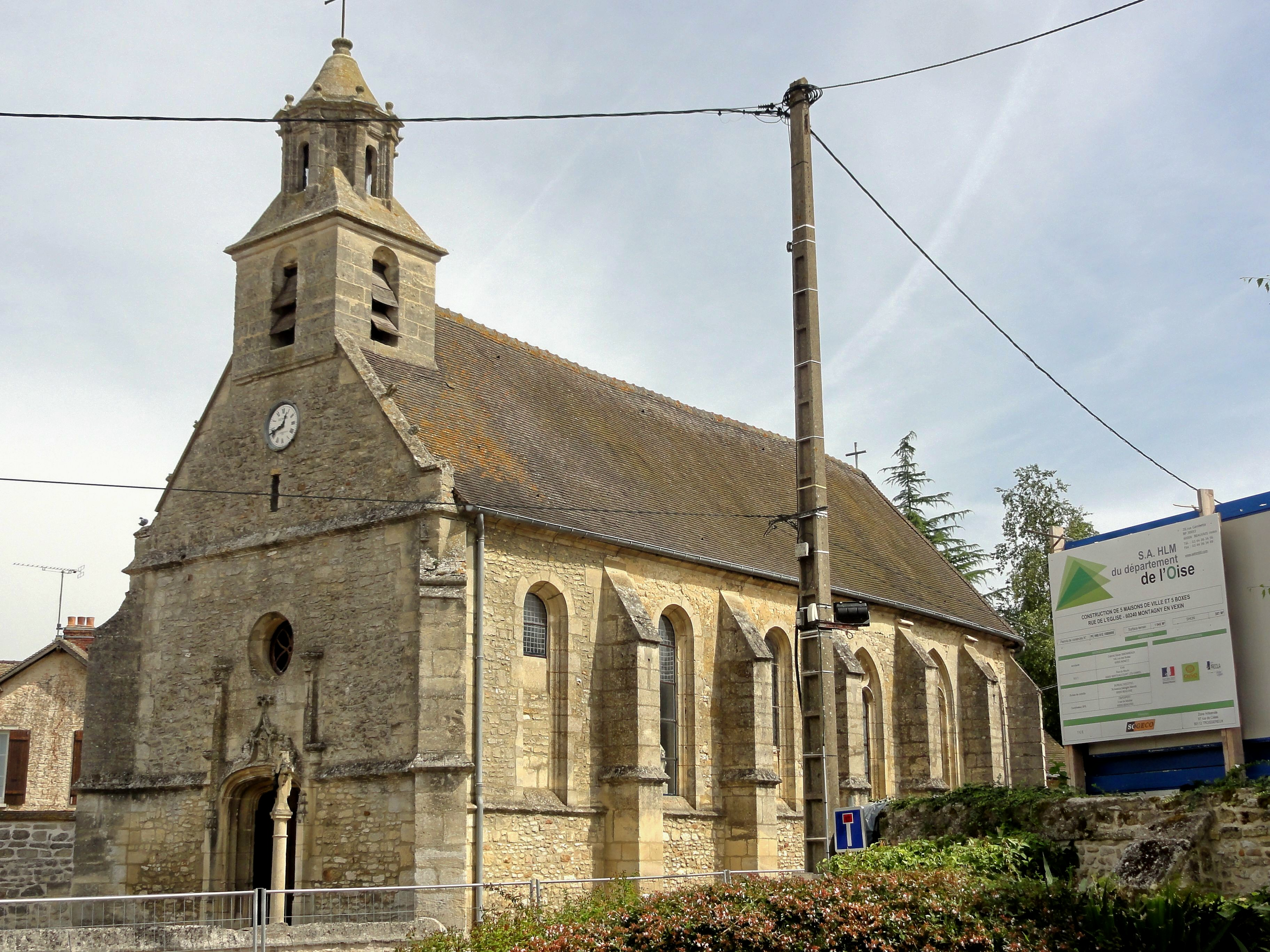
- The church in Montagny-en-Vexin

- Coat of arms
- Location of Montagny-en-Vexin
- Location within France Location within Hauts-de-France
- Coordinates: 49°11′46″N 1°48′04″E
- Country: France
- Region: Hauts-de-France
- Department: Oise
- Arrondissement: Beauvais
- Canton: Chaumont-en-Vexin
- Intercommunality: Vexin Thelle

Government
  - Mayor (2020–2026): Loïc Taillebrest
- Area^{1}: 4.18 km^{2} (1.61 sq mi)
- Highest elevation: 203 m (666 ft)
- Lowest elevation: 87 m (285 ft)
- Population (2023): 672
  - Density: 161/km^{2} (416/sq mi)
- Time zone: UTC+01:00 (CET)
  - Summer (DST): UTC+02:00 (CEST)
- INSEE/Postal code: 60412 /60240
- ^{1} French Land Register data, which excludes lakes, ponds, glaciers > 1 km^{2} (0.386 sq mi or 247 acres) and river estuaries.

Montagny-en-Vexin (French pronunciation: [mɔ̃taɲi ɑ̃ vɛksɛ̃], literally Montagny in Vexin) is a commune in the Oise department in northern France.

It takes its name from Vexin, a former province between Île-de-France and Normandy.

== See also ==
- Communes of the Oise department
