= Montjavoult =

- Commune
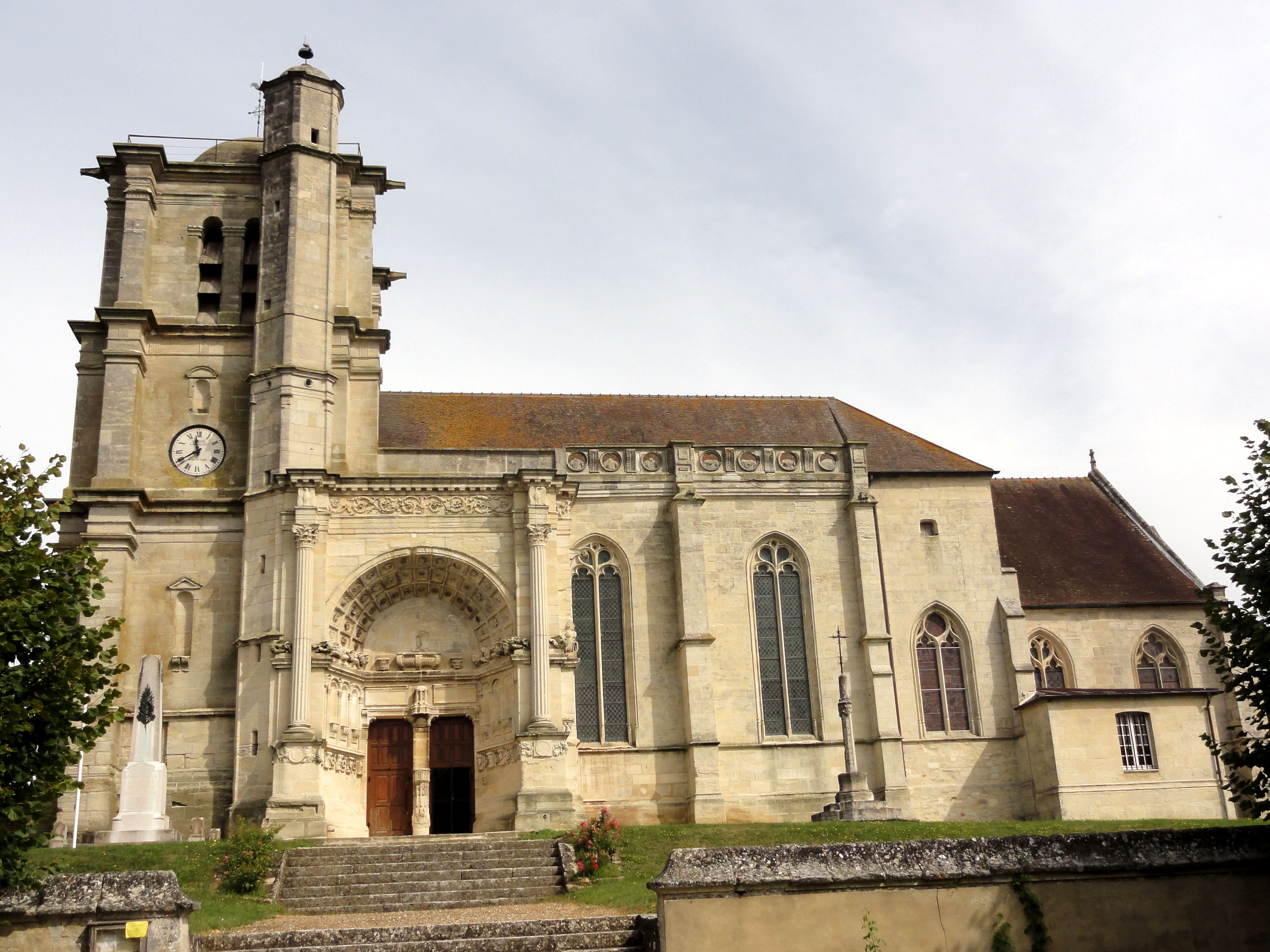
- The church in Montjavoult
- Location of Montjavoult
- Location within France Location within Hauts-de-France
- Coordinates: 49°12′54″N 1°47′01″E
- Country: France
- Region: Hauts-de-France
- Department: Oise
- Arrondissement: Beauvais
- Canton: Chaumont-en-Vexin
- Intercommunality: Vexin Thelle

Government
  - Mayor (2020–2026): Laura Catry
- Area^{1}: 16.73 km^{2} (6.46 sq mi)
- Elevation: 207 m (679 ft)
- Highest elevation: 207 m (679 ft)
- Lowest elevation: 71 m (233 ft)
- Population (2023): 530
  - Density: 32/km^{2} (82/sq mi)
- Time zone: UTC+01:00 (CET)
  - Summer (DST): UTC+02:00 (CEST)
- INSEE/Postal code: 60420 /60240
- ^{1} French Land Register data, which excludes lakes, ponds, glaciers > 1 km^{2} (0.386 sq mi or 247 acres) and river estuaries.

Montjavoult (French pronunciation: [mɔ̃ʒavu]) is a commune in the Oise department in northern France.

== See also ==
- Communes of the Oise department
