= Mogneville, Oise =

Mogneville
- Commune
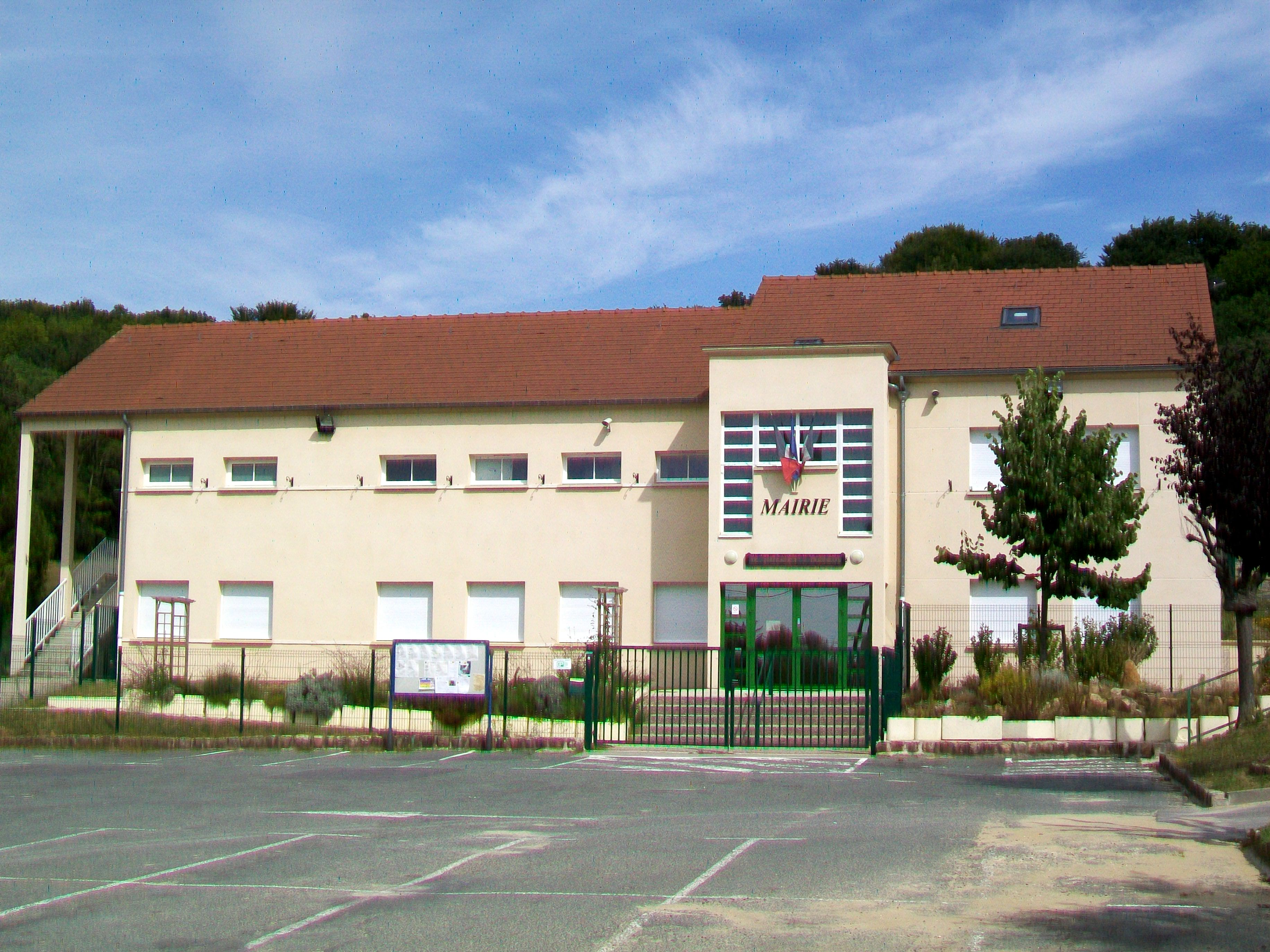
- The town hall in Mogneville

- Coat of arms
- Location of Mogneville
- Location within France Location within Hauts-de-France
- Coordinates: 49°18′54″N 2°28′20″E
- Country: France
- Region: Hauts-de-France
- Department: Oise
- Arrondissement: Clermont
- Canton: Nogent-sur-Oise
- Intercommunality: Liancourtois

Government
  - Mayor (2020–2026): Michel Delahoche
- Area^{1}: 3.91 km^{2} (1.51 sq mi)
- Elevation: 51 m (167 ft)
- Highest elevation: 113 m (371 ft)
- Lowest elevation: 36 m (118 ft)
- Population (2023): 1,487
  - Density: 380/km^{2} (985/sq mi)
- Time zone: UTC+01:00 (CET)
  - Summer (DST): UTC+02:00 (CEST)
- INSEE/Postal code: 60404 /60140
- ^{1} French Land Register data, which excludes lakes, ponds, glaciers > 1 km^{2} (0.386 sq mi or 247 acres) and river estuaries.

Mogneville (French pronunciation: [mɔɲvil]) is a commune in the Oise department in northern France.

== History ==
Though inhabited from the Stone Age, the existence of the village first dates from the Romans. One of the merchants who followed Caesar and his camp to Catenoy, placed himself on the site of the modern village. The name of the village derives from the Latin Monnachivilla, "settlement of the monks", which is Moineville in French. Monks inhabited this territory in the 10th and 11th centuries. The Abbey of Chaalis, the Abbey of Lannoy and the Priory of Wariville possessed benefices here.

== Population ==
Historical population
| Year | Pop. | ±% p.a. |
|---|---|---|
| 1968 | 629 | — |
| 1975 | 721 | +1.97% |
| 1982 | 803 | +1.55% |
| 1990 | 1,203 | +5.18% |
| 1999 | 1,373 | +1.48% |
| 2007 | 1,476 | +0.91% |
| 2012 | 1,487 | +0.15% |
| 2017 | 1,515 | +0.37% |
| 2023 | 1,487 | −0.31% |
Source: INSEE

== Sights ==
The Church of Saint-Denis is the oldest monument in the village of Mogneville. It was proclaimed a historic building by a decree of July 1937. The current building is a reconstruction of the XII structure. First it was reconstructed into a Roman church, later on – into Gothic.

== See also ==
- Communes of the Oise department
