= The Sweet Landscape =

Painting by Pierre Puvis de Chavannes

- Doux Pays (French)
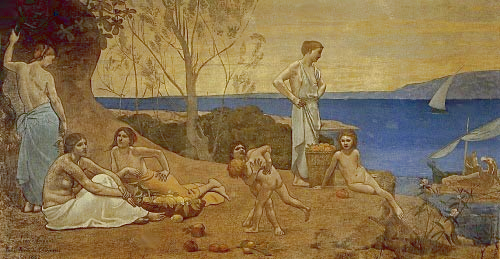
- Artist: Pierre Puvis de Chavannes
- Year: 1882
- Medium: Oil on canvas
- Dimensions: 230 cm × 430 cm (91 in × 170 in)
- Location: Musée Bonnat, Bayonne

The Sweet Landscape (French: Doux Pays) is an oil on canvas painting by the French painter Pierre Puvis de Chavannes, created in 1882. It is held at the Musée Bonnat, in Bayonne.

== History and description ==
This work is an idyll which represents four young women and three children, more or less naked, enjoying their time on a promontory overlooking the sea, where are visible several sailboats. Presented at the Salon of 1882, the painter exchanged this work for a Portrait of Puvis de Chavannes. also exhibited there, executed by his friend painter Léon Bonnat. Since then it then adorned the staircase of his colleague's private mansion on rue de Bassano, in Paris.

It is a fundamental pictorial work when studying symbolism since it is a capital work in the production of Pierre Puvis de Chavannes. It depicts a series of characters recreating themselves on the shores of a lake. The fact that there is hardly any sensation of depth stands out. The palette that the painter uses here gives the work greater mysticism, something sought after among the French symbolists.

It is a painting where the search for an ideal beauty is evident as well as a desire for formal simplification. It is also characterized by academic gravity and formality loaded with a certain timeless universality, that indicates a strong rejection of the transitory. In this and all of Puvis de Chavannes paintings there is what has been called an “impulsive order”, undoubtedly due to his scientific training intermingled with his personality as a symbolist painter.

This work can be related to another important work by Puvis de Chavannes, The Poor Fisherman (1881). The transcendence of misery in the figure of the fisherman, represents for the artist another immortal theme, which can be found in his symbolist works.

Several drawings and a painted sketch, now at the Yale University Art Gallery, are known of this painting.
