= Antonin Personnaz =

French photographer

Antonin Personnaz (1854 – 31 December 1936) was a French art collector and early colour photographer.

== Early life ==
Antonin Personnaz was born in 1854 (1855, according to James) in Bayonne into a wealthy family of fabric exporters of Sephardic origin, from the commune of Bessans. He attended primary school there and died in the same town on 31 December 1936.

== Art collector ==
Personnaz was a lover of art and a friend and patron of painters. In 1878, at age 23, Personnaz moved with his family to 4 rue Sainte-Cécile, Paris, where he was employed in his father's business 'Personnaz and Gardin', later becoming a partner, an occupation he regarded as secondary to, and supporting, his interest in art. He had started collecting antique works, including those of Jaime Huguet and the Master of Palanquinos in 1875, and from 1879 concentrated on paintings and drawings. In 1880 his first Modern acquisition was an Ironers pastel which he purchased direct from its artist Edgar Degas, followed by paintings by Albert Lebourg and Jean-François Raffaelli. He befriended Camille Pissarro whom he met through Paul Gachet, who together introduced him to other Impressionists.

During 1892-1893 he visited the collectors Georges Murat, Eugène Murer, Paul Durand-Ruel, Paul Gallimard, Eugène Blot and Jean-Baptiste Faure, who were all buying Impressionist art, despite the prevailing taste for the 'style pompier' of the École des Beaux-Arts. Like them he began to purchase works from his most innovative contemporaries, along with old masters like Franz Hals. In 1906 he acquired Le Pont d'Argenteuil by Claude Monet from Durand-Ruel for only 20 francs at time when the dealer was finding few buyers for impressionist works.

Personnaz' father supported Léon Joseph Florentin Bonnat, in starting his painting career with training in Rome, where he and Personnaz stayed together, and who introduced him into artistic circles, Personnaz was from c.1902 behind the creation of the Musée Bonnat in Bayonne which he later directed and to which he added much of his own contemporary collection; paintings collected by Personnaz form the third floor of the Musee Bonnat collection Though they had different tastes in art, their friendship continued throughout Personnaz's life; Bonnat was a traditional and fashionable portraitist, and a fellow Prix de Rome student with Degas.

== Photographer ==
In 1896, on return from a business trip to Florence, Personnaz encountered the work of French photographer Constant Puyo, whom he acclaimed as the 'Botticelli of photography', and whose work inspired his interest in the emerging Pictorialist style. That year he became a member of the Société française de photographie, where he held the post of assistant secretary and then secretary general from 1911 to 1919 and in 1900 he joined the Société d’excursion des amateurs de photographie, an excursion group for amateur photographers, and exhibited in the French photography section of the Exposition Universelle (1900). In 1903 he won First Prize for his picture A-B-C in a contest held by the Revue de Photographie, and a medal at Le Havre for his stereoscopic views. The same year he photographed Pissarro in his studio which he exhibited at the Salon du Photo-Club de Paris held annually at the Georges Petit gallery and at the Durand-Ruel gallery, in which he exhibited for a number of years, and began writing articles of criticism and on art processes in photography. His successes continued, with First Prize in the Third Concourse of the Revue de Photographie in 1904.

=== 'Impressionist' photography ===
From 1906, Personnaz practiced the colour Autochrome process invented by Auguste and Louis Lumière (used by photographers from 1893 but only patented in 1904) and was amongst those, including Jules Gervais-Courtellemont, Léon Gimpel and Jacques-Henri Lartigue, who would raise their autochromes to the status of artistic works. He first exhibited such pictures, made in Madrid, by projection at the S.F.P. that year (the process produced transparencies, not prints). Personnaz believed that the colour image, when projected and enlarged on a screen to a scale similar to that of a painting, its atmospheric depth is enhanced. Overall he produced more than a thousand plates in that medium, the grainy rendering of which lends it an Impressionist quality, and which also related to Pointillism, Georges Seurat's theory of optical mixture of pigments, adopted by Pissarro in the 1880s.

Such aesthetic qualities Personnaz ardently defended as “autochromie artistique", and emphasised in making pictures at sites and of subjects depicted by the painters; rural landscapes of the Val-de-Seine and Auvers sur Oise on the outskirts of Paris, where Personnaz moved in 1885 to be nearer the artistic community. He photographed peasant scenes, haystacks, river views, women with umbrellas, flowering apple trees, fields strewn with poppies and the painters themselves at work. The majority of his images were taken there, and later in the Basque Country, Creuse and the Mediterranean Coast. He urged other photographers to;

“not limit [the autochrome plate] to producing dazzling tones, let us also turn our eyes to the master landscapists: the Cazins, the Monets, the divine Corot […] Let us be inspired by their examples by seeking to translate the softest and most delicate colours in nature, and in this way we too will make a work of art."

In this regard, the similarity between Penonnaz's autochrome Field of Poppies and Monet's 1873) Coquelicots, La promenade, known in English as 'Field of Poppies,' is noted. He also proposed that;

"the Autochrome plate sees...with the precursor eye [of the] valiant Impressionists."

=== Technique ===
To overcome the limited exposure latitude of the medium, he achieved saturated colour in both subjects and background sky (which normally overexposed) by shooting with the sun directly on his subject, angled obliquely as it is in early morning or late afternoon. To render clouds, during the long exposures required by the Autochrome plate, he waved black card in front of the lens to cut back the brightness of the sky. Preferring to work in shades of grey or in rainy weather, in one instance he records himself photographing haystacks in the snow and fog, and his subtle imagery sometimes tends towards almost monochrome.

=== Writings on photography ===
Personnaz wrote several articles on the Autochrome process. Several showings of his photographs were held at the SPF and he published several articles in the society's review, and his maritime picture was the frontispiece of the Annuaire General et International de la Photographie 1907 accompanied by his romantic story The Vocation of Chanikoff, based on it. His writings discuss the relationship between painting and photography and he gave lectures on the same theme in France and abroad, and presented the conference Concerning Art Processes in Photography in 1907. In 1910 he wrote on the impressionistic effects of Autochrome.

== Later life and legacy ==
Personnaz retired in 1919 to 22 rue Lormand in Bayonne, overlooking the Adour river beyond the classical symmetry of the Jardin Leon Bonnat, with its fountain and bronze bust of the artist, and 500 metres from the Musée Bonnat. There he continued his association with learned societies and devoted himself to the development of the museum, and on the death of Léon Bonnat, wrote tributes to him and literature on his art. In 1931 he loaned Le Pont d'Argenteuil to the Claude Monet retrospective at the Orangerie des Tuileries. He continued to make numerous artistic and documentary autochromes of the Basque country, then a remote corner of France.

On his death after an illness on 31 December 1936, his widow, Clémentine (née Clémentine Pauline Simon, his mistress, whom he married in 1915), delivered a legacy of 142 works to the national museums, including first-rate, mainly Impressionist works by Pissarro, Armand Guillaumin, Degas, Renoir, Vignon, Toulouse-Lautrec and Degas, which are held at the Musée d’Orsay and at the Musée Bonnat-Helleu. She donated a large collection of photographs and cameras to the Société française de photographie. In 1947 she made a further donation of 44 paintings to the Bonnat museum, under the control of the national museums. Since 1986 the Personnaz collection has been administered by the Musée d’Orsay. Of note is that his Claude Monet, Le Pont d'Argenteuil was damaged in an act of vandalism in 2007.

The Musée des Beaux-Arts de Rouen dedicated an exhibition to him as part of the Normandy Impressionist Festival 2020.

A portrait bust of Personnaz by Paul Paulin is held in the Musée d'Orsay.

== Publications ==
- Personnaz, Antonin, Paris, H. Laurens, 1925
- Personnaz, Antonin (1903) article in Revue de Photographie
- Personnaz, Antonin (1904) article in Bulletin de S.F.P.
- Personnaz, Antonin, (1905) article in Revue de Photographie
- Personnaz, Antonin, (1906) article in Bulletin de S.F.P.
- Personnaz, A., & Musée Bonnat. (1930). Catalogue sommaire: Antiquités égyptiennes, grecques et romaines, sculptures, tableaux et objets d'art du Moyen Age, de la Renaissance et des temps modernes.

== Exhibitions ==
- 1903: Salon Photo-Club, Paris
- 1904: Salon Photo-Club, Paris
- 1905: Salon Photo-Club, Paris
- 1906: Salon Photo-Club, Paris
- 1907: Salon Photo-Club, Paris
- 1908: Salon Photo-Club, Paris
- 1996/7: Work included in La couleur sensible: photographies autochromes, 1907-1935, Centre de la Vieille Charité, 19 December–16 February
- 2020: Antonin Personnaz (1854-1936), Impressionist Photographer, Musée des Beaux-Arts de Rouen, 11 July - 15 November Impressionist Photographer11 July - 15 November
