= Nils Forsberg =

Swedish painter (1842–1934)

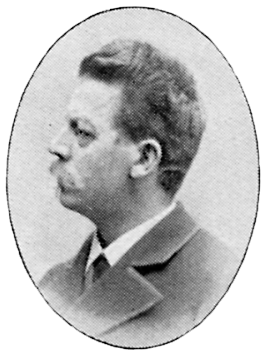
- Born: Nils Forsberg; 17 December 1842; Riseberga
- Died: 8 November 1934 (aged 91); Helsingborg
- Known for: Painter

Nils Forsberg (17 December 1842 – 8 November 1934) was a Swedish painter who lived and worked in Paris for much of his career.

== Life ==
Forsberg was born to a destitute family in a small village called Riseberga, in the province of Scania. The son of a peasant, he spent his early years in farming, then was apprenticed to a house-painter in Gothenburg. He made a statue of Minerva which procured for him a government stipend which enabled him to go to Paris in 1867. In Paris he was a student in the atelier of Léon Bonnat. Art historian Richard Muther would later write that Forsberg "became the Swedish Bonnat". The siege of Paris, during which he enlisted in the Ambulance Department, afforded him opportunities for studying and sketching the scenes that he observed. In 1877 he exhibited Family of Acrobats before the Circus Director, now in the Gothenburg Museum of Art. This work, which typifies Forsberg's commitment to social reform, shows the influence of the French Realists in its depiction of child labor.

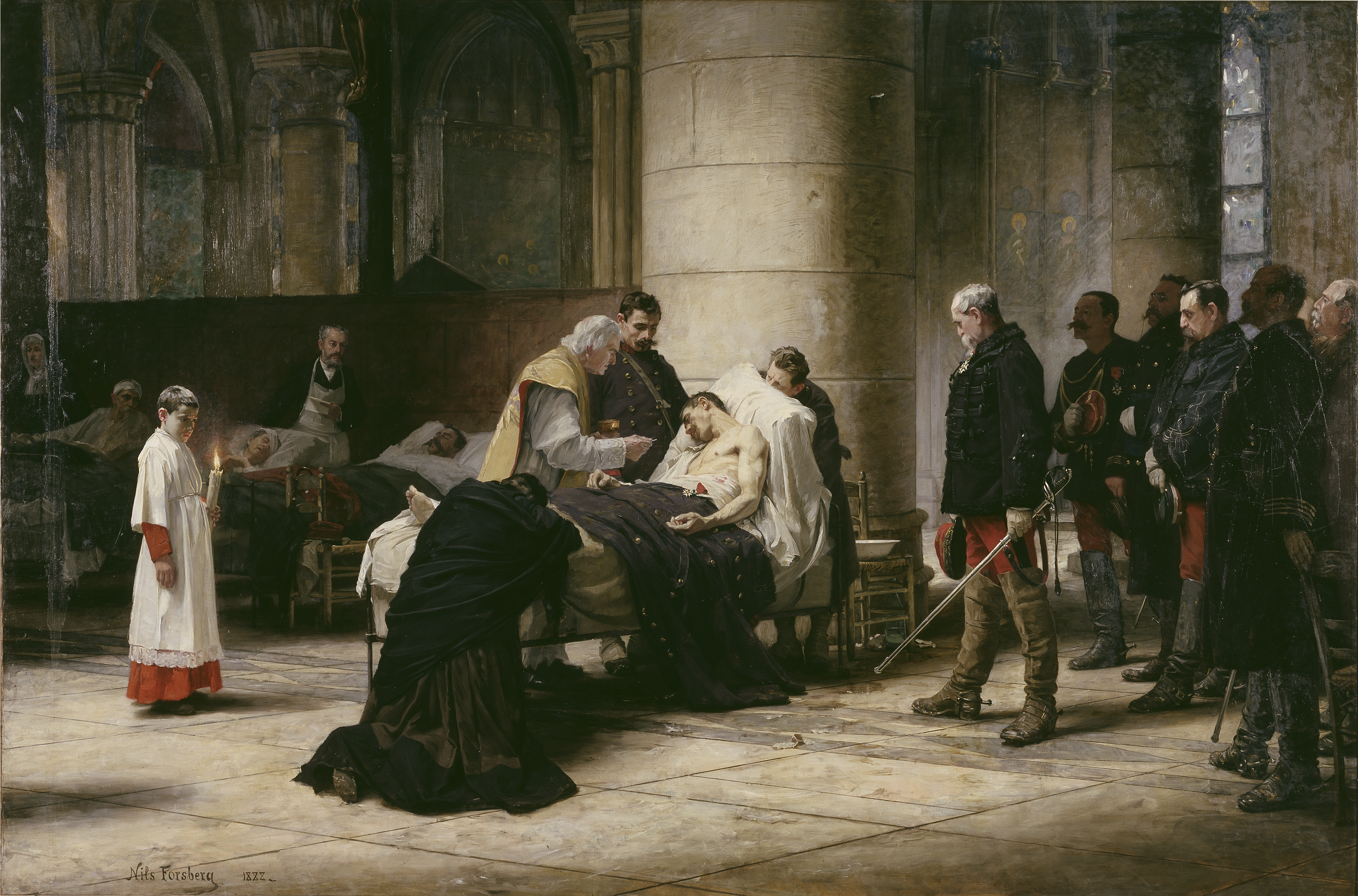
Nils Forsberg Death of a Hero (1888)

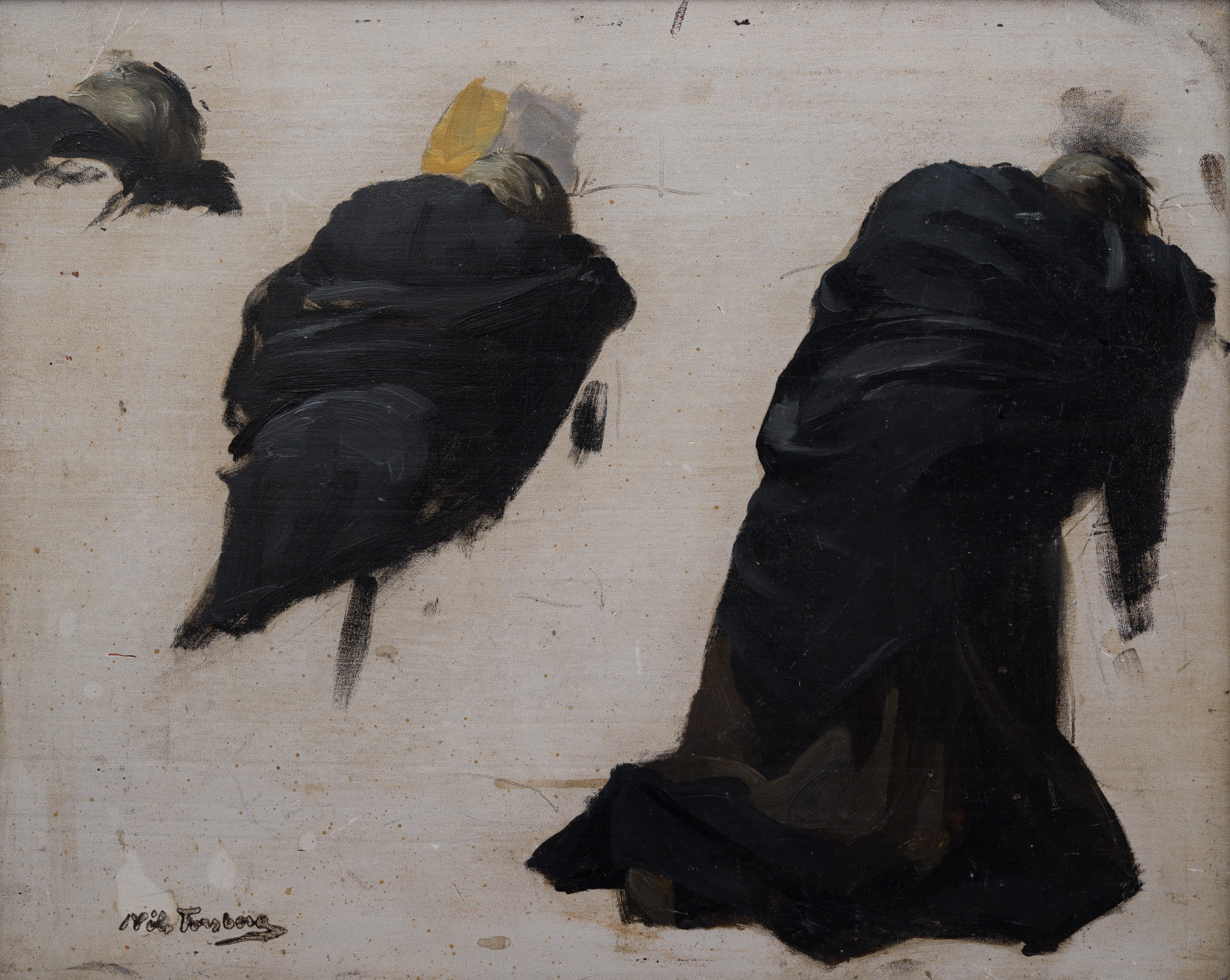
Oil sketch for "Death of a Hero"

In 1888 he received the gold medal at the Salon for his painting The Death of a Hero, now in the Nationalmuseum of Stockholm. The culmination of his ambition to renew traditional history painting with a vigorous contemporary realism, it took him several years to complete, and was inspired by his experiences during the Franco-Prussian War. Afterwards he devoted himself more especially to historical subjects. In 1904 he returned to Sweden, where he lived in Helsingborg. He died in Helsingborg on 8 November 1934.

He had a son, Nils Forsberg the younger (b 1870), who was also a painter.

== Permanent collections ==
In total, 25 of Forsberg's works are held by the Nationalmuseum. Several of his works, including the 1900 painting Gustaf II Adolf before Battle of Lützen, are held by the Gothenburg Museum of Art.

== Gallery ==
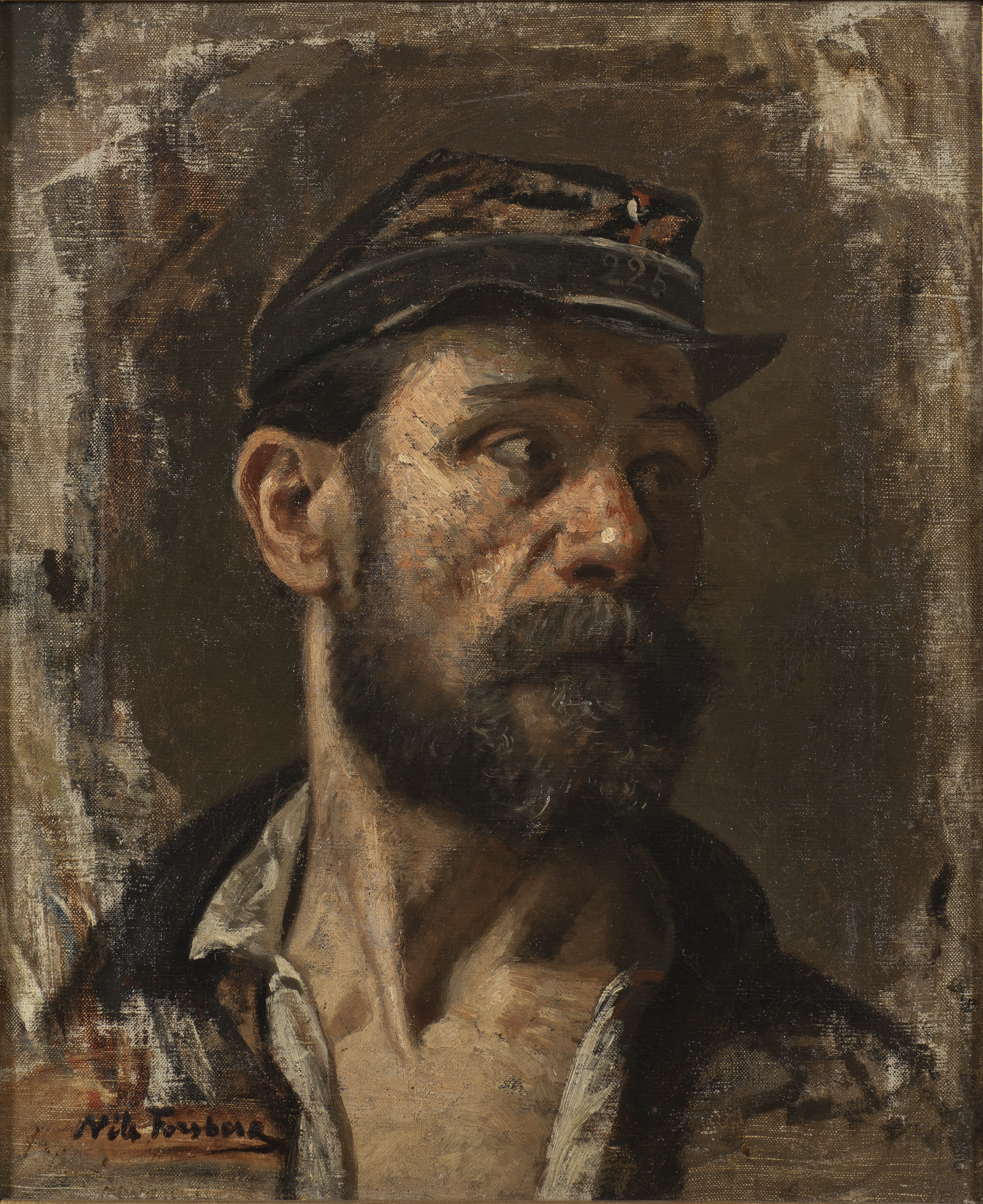
A Communard (1871) Nationalmuseum

Family of Acrobats before the Circus Director (1877)

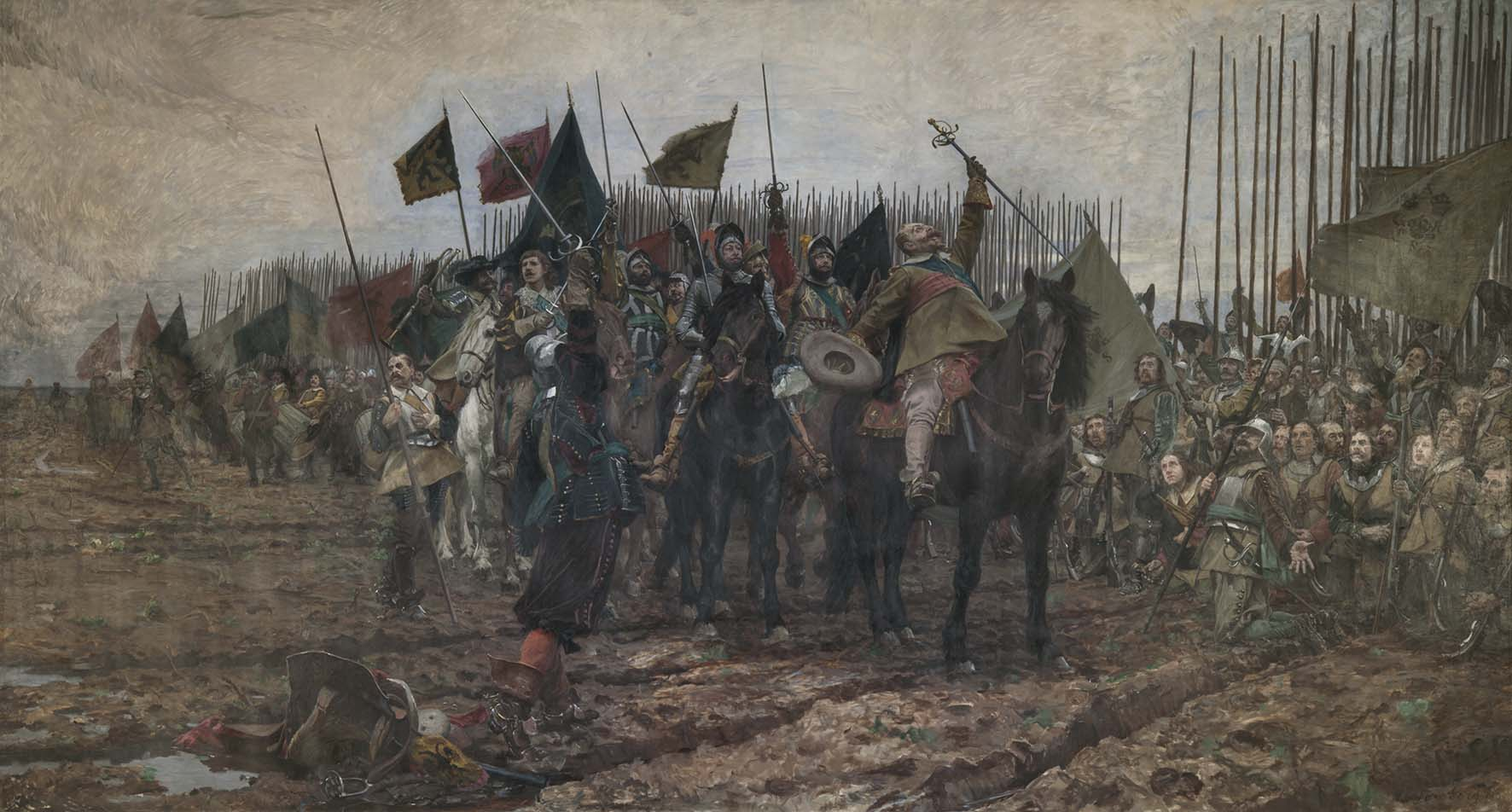
Gustav II Adolf before the Battle of Lutzen of 1632, in which the king died. Gothenburg Museum of Art, 1900

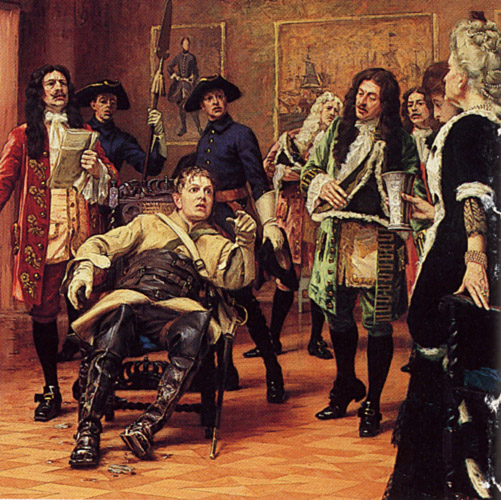
Stenbock's Courier (1911)

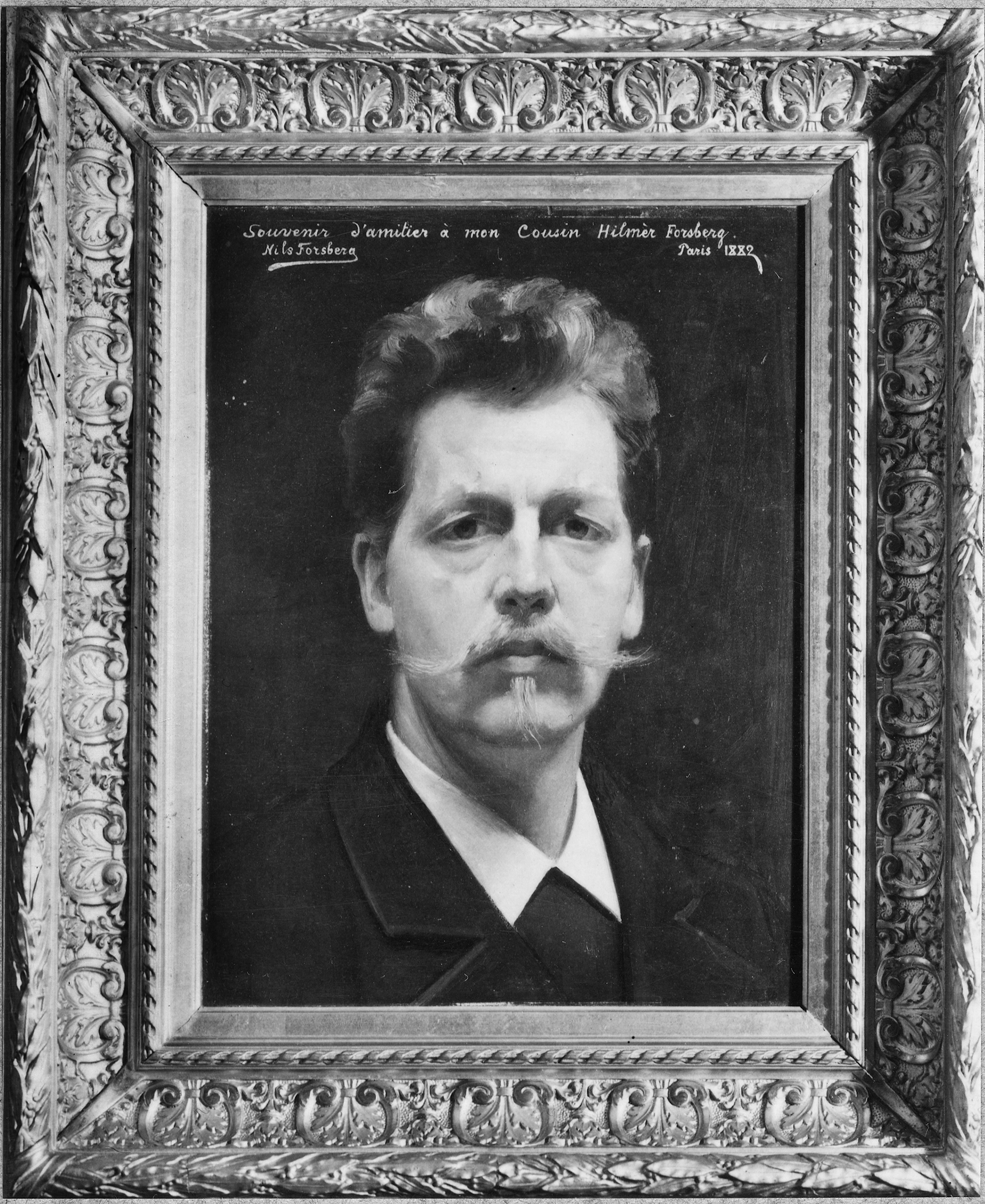
Self-portrait (1882)
