= Henri Adrien Tanoux =

French painter

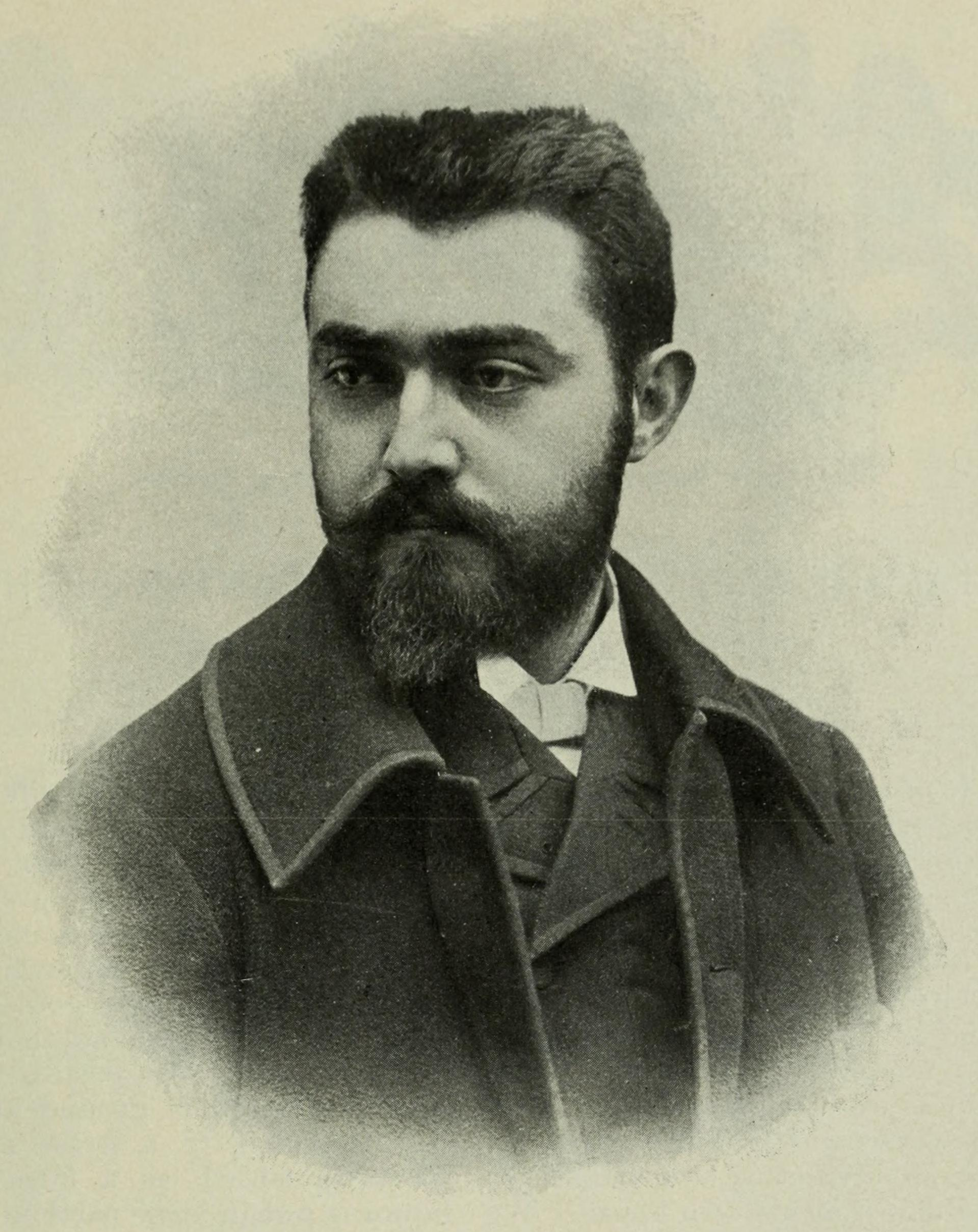
Henri Adrien Tanoux (1887)

Antoine Auguste Adrien Henri Tanoux (18 October 1865 in Marseille – 29 July 1923 in Paris) was a French painter.

== Biography ==
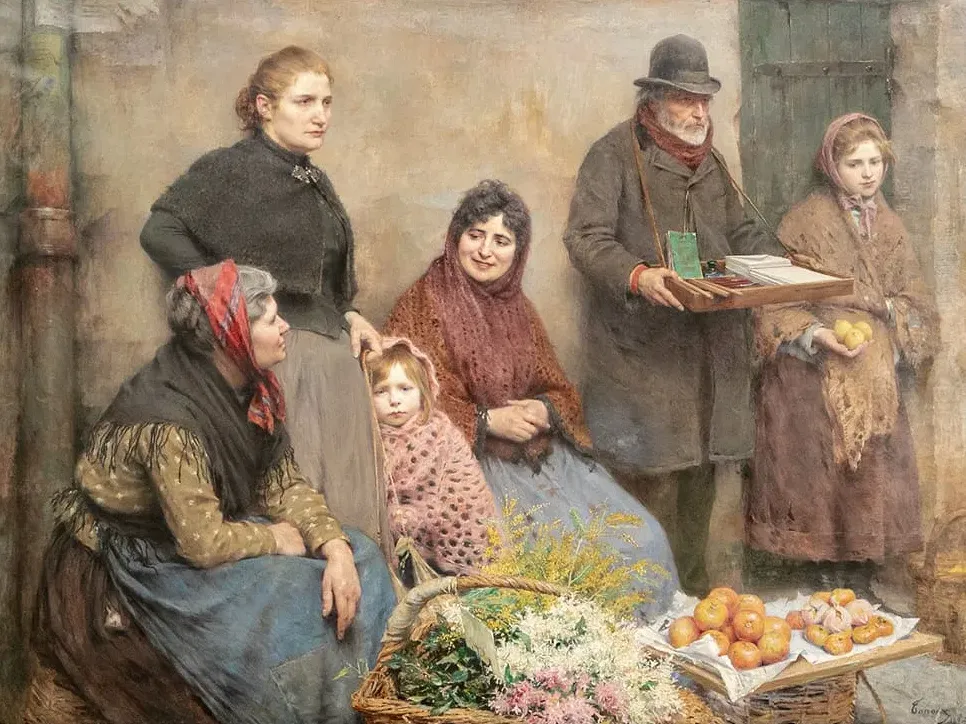
Street vendors, 1895

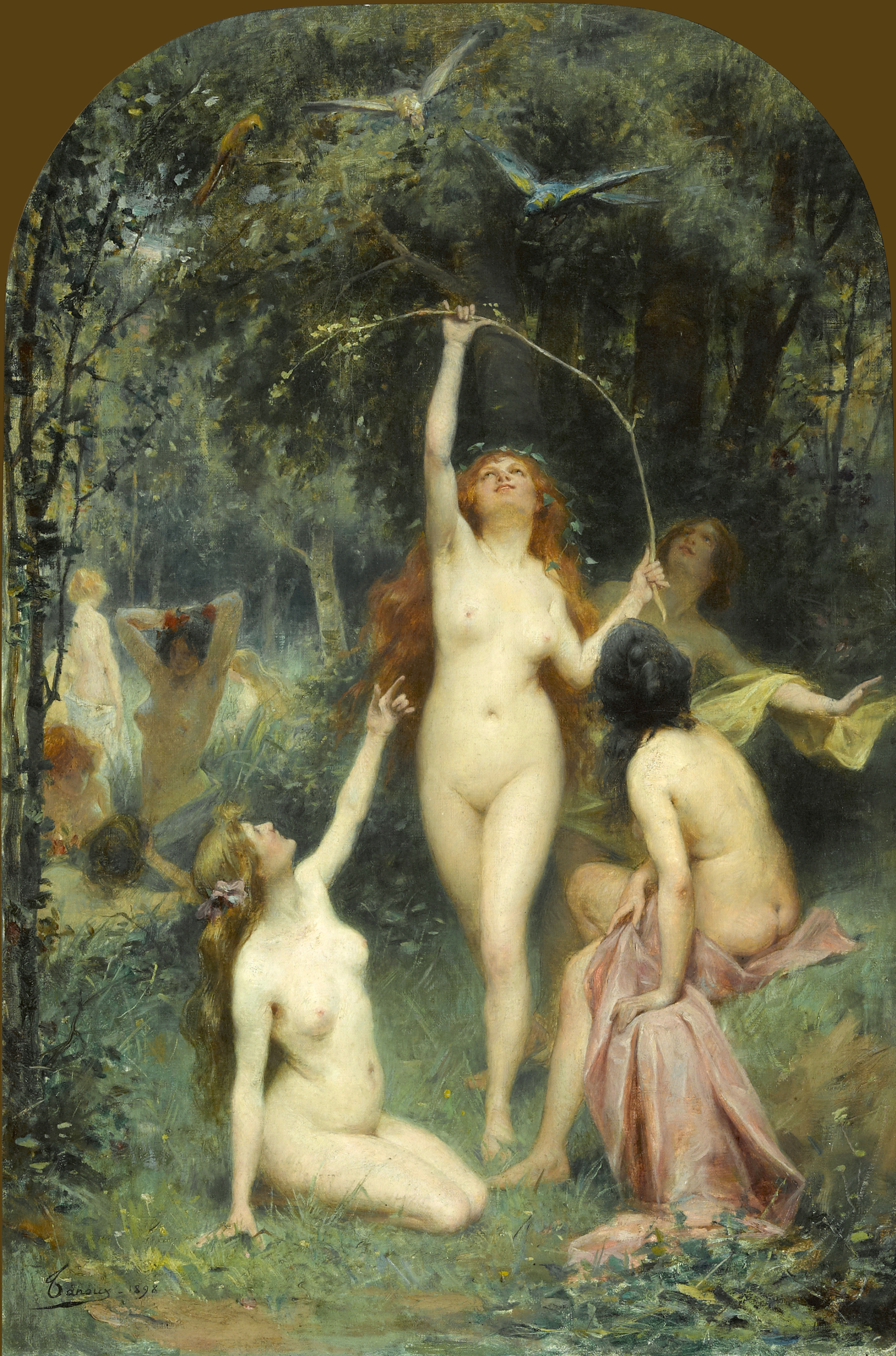
Nymphs In A Forest

He began his studies in 1878 at the École supérieure d'art et de design Marseille-Méditerranée. After graduating there, in 1886, he enrolled at the École nationale supérieure des beaux-arts in Paris, where he became a student of Léon Bonnat.

During this time, he presented some works at the Salon. He would exhibit there regularly throughout his life. In 1889, he received an honorable mention at the Exposition Universelle.

He was initially attracted to painting scenes in the outlying suburbs but, after receiving a travel grant from the Conseil supérieur des Beaux-Arts in 1895, he turned to genre scenes, portraits and Orientalist works, becoming especially well known for his nudes.

In 1905, he was elected a member of the Société des artistes français. A retrospective of his work was held in 1924.

His works may be seen at the Musée des Beaux-Arts de Chambéry, Musée de Grenoble, Musée des Beaux-Arts de Marseille, Musée Cantini, Musée de la Faïence et des Beaux-Arts, Musée des Beaux-Arts de Nice and the Musée des Beaux-Arts de Rouen, among others.

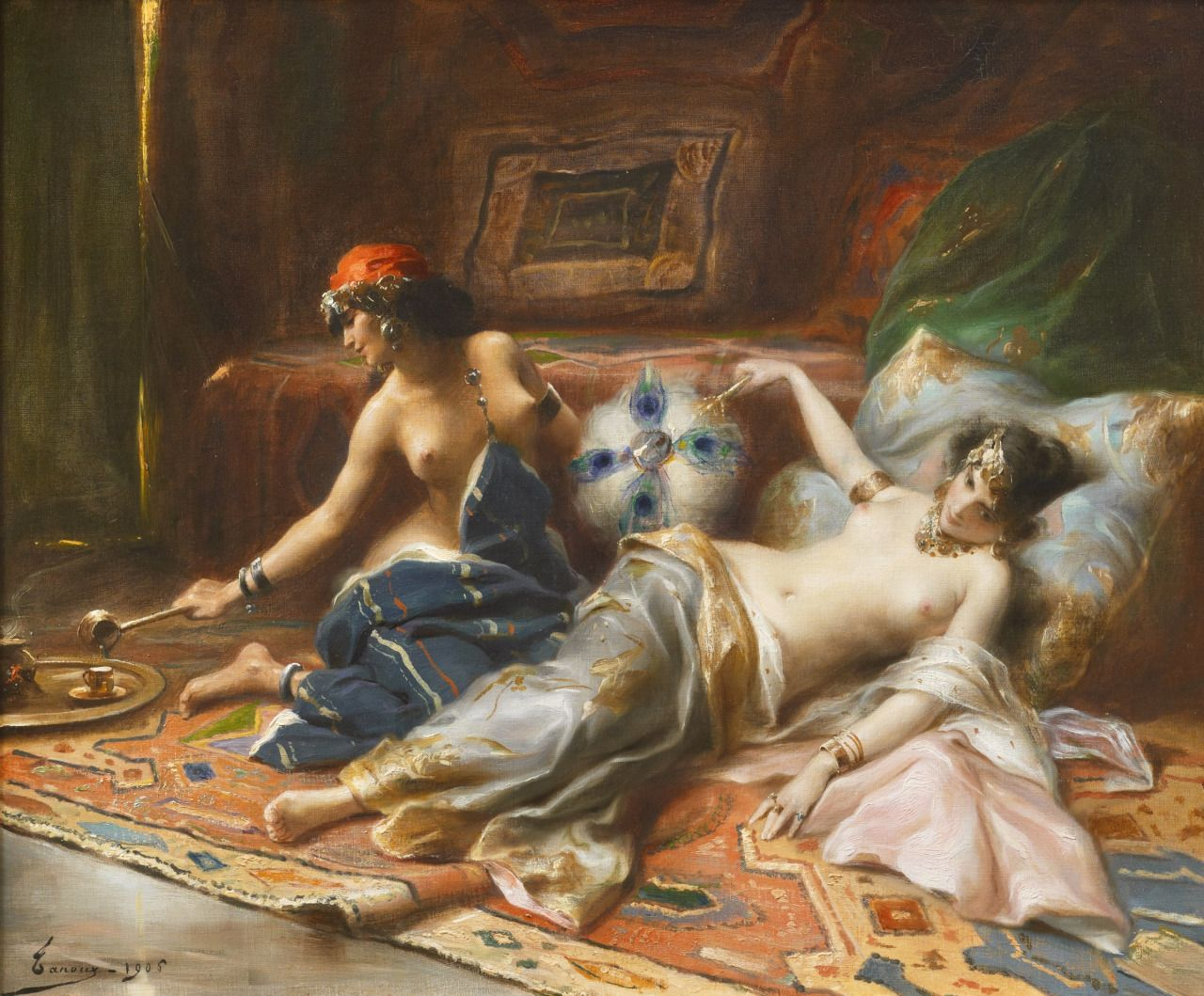
(1905)

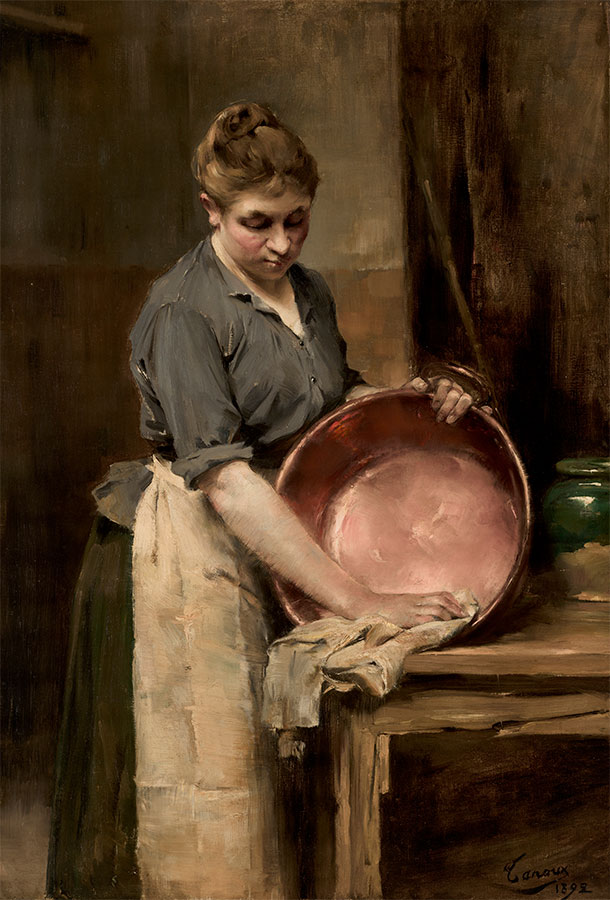
The maid, 1892

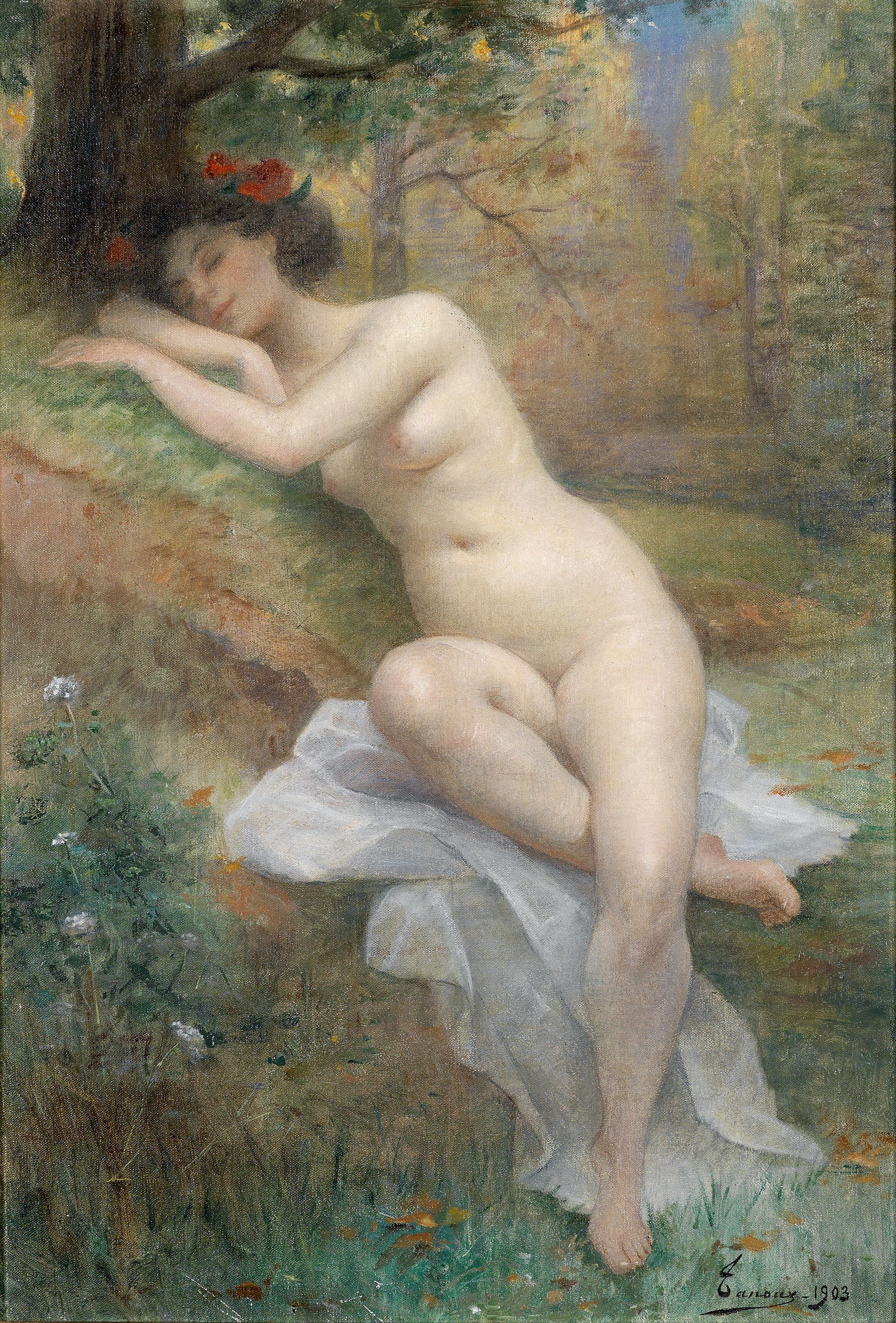
Weiblicher Akt in Waldlandschaft, 1903

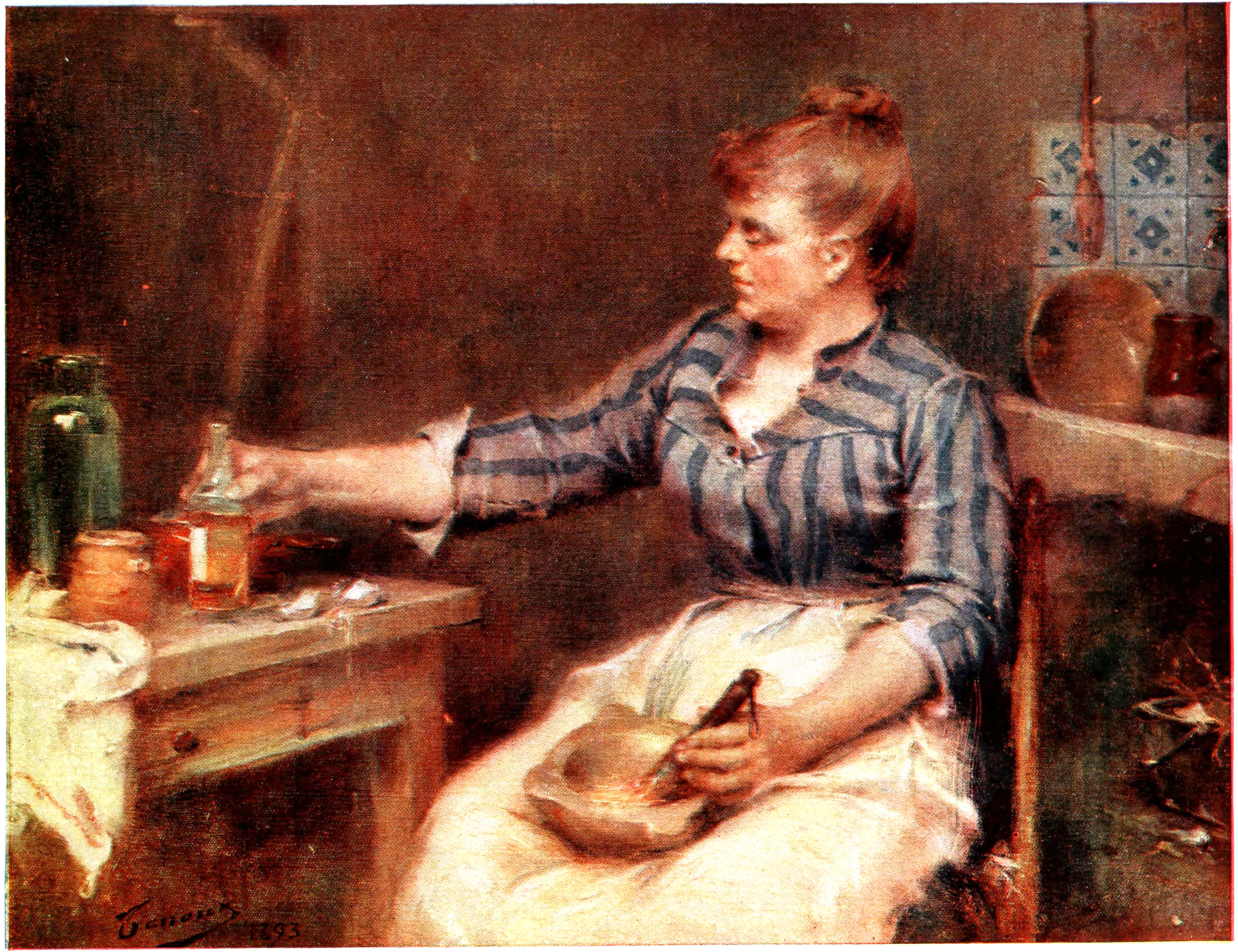
1905

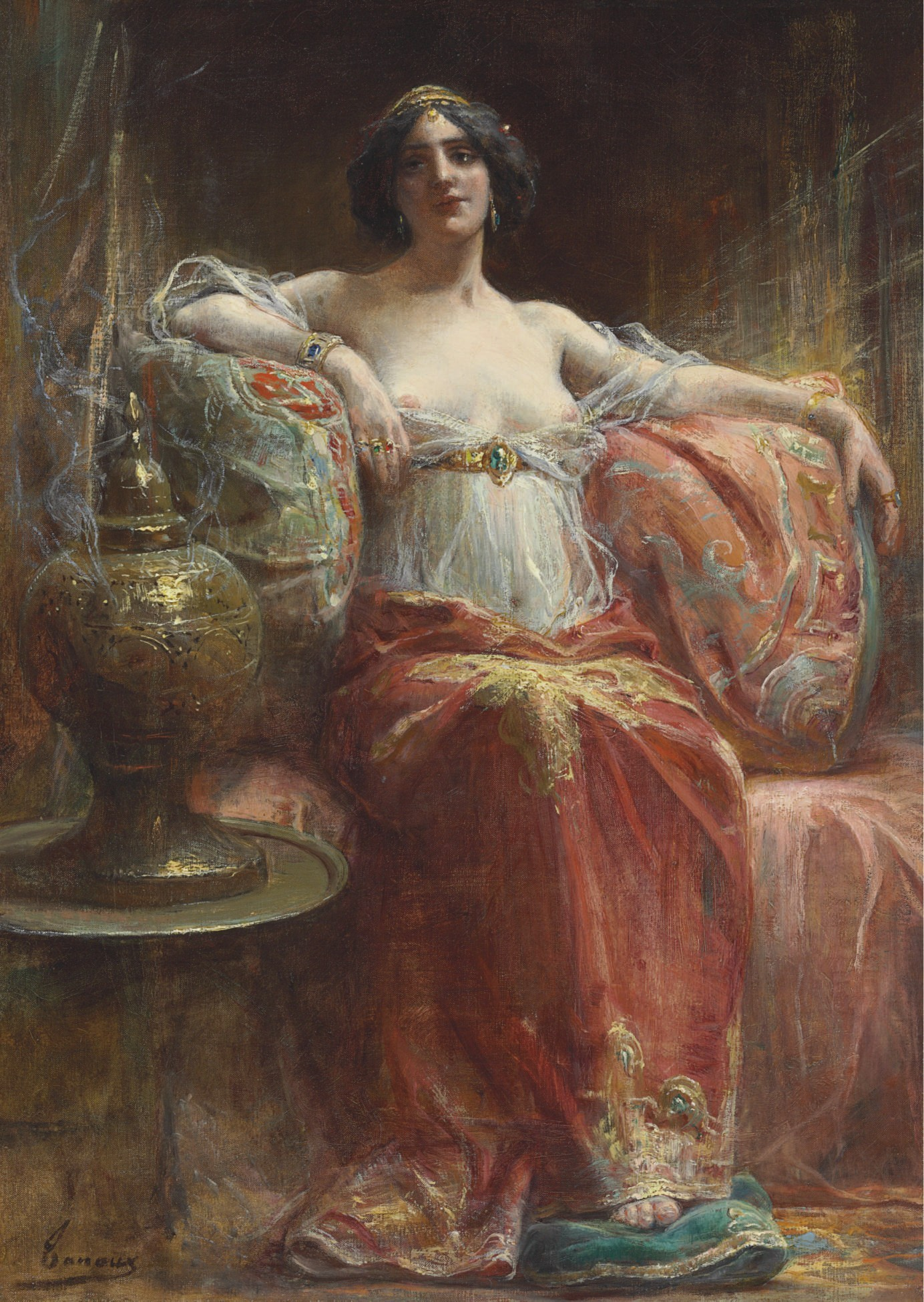
The sultan's favourite

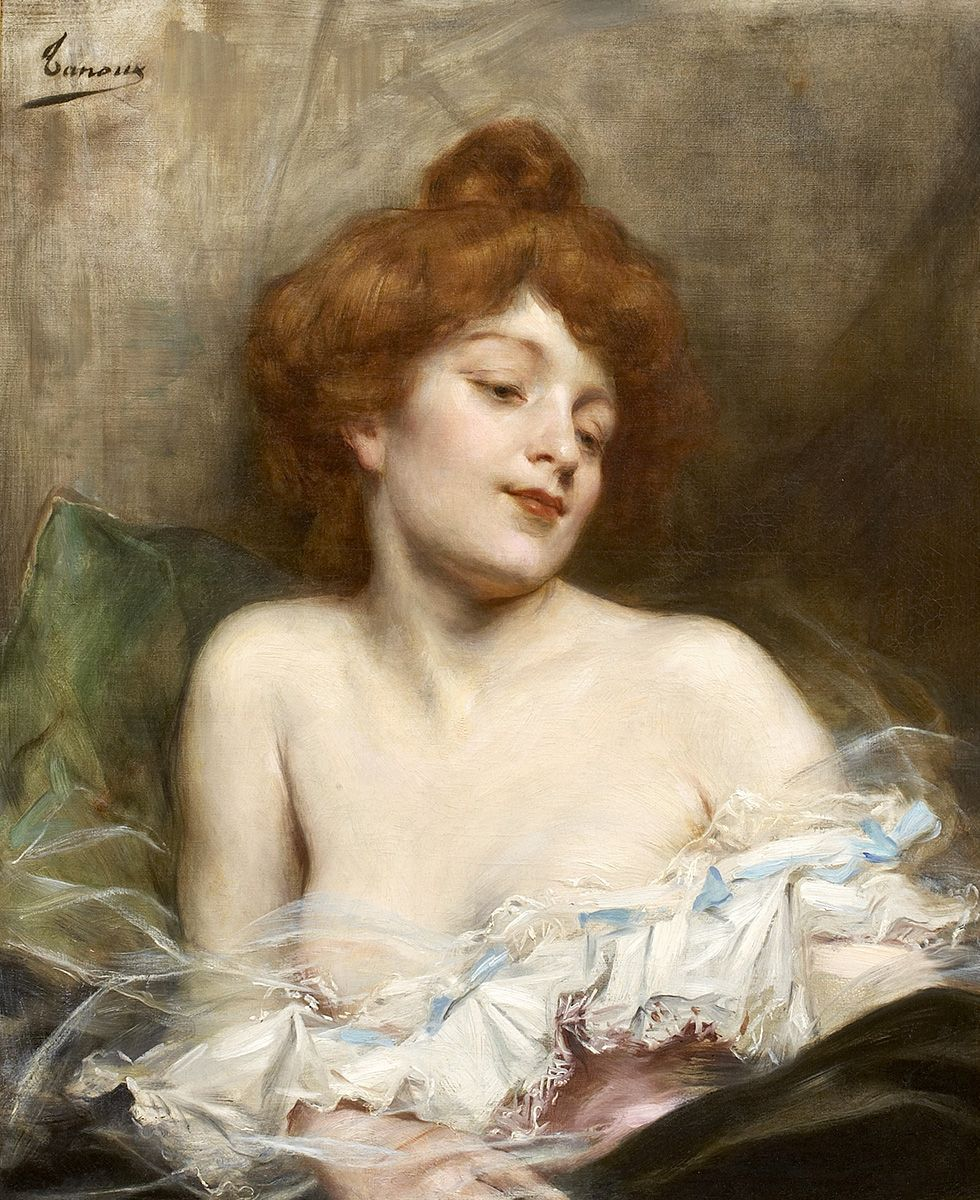
Rêverie

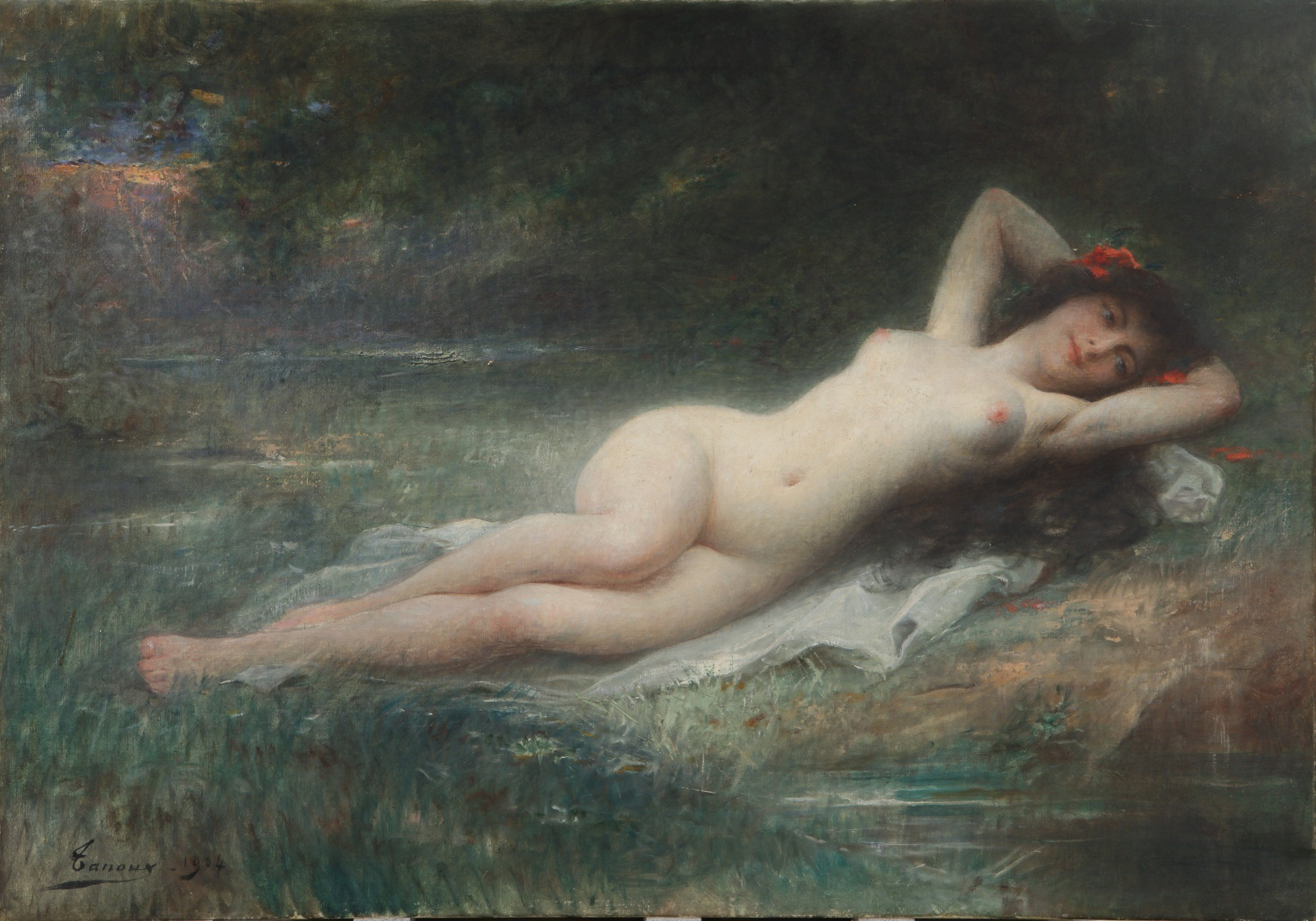
(Museo Nacional de Bellas Artes)

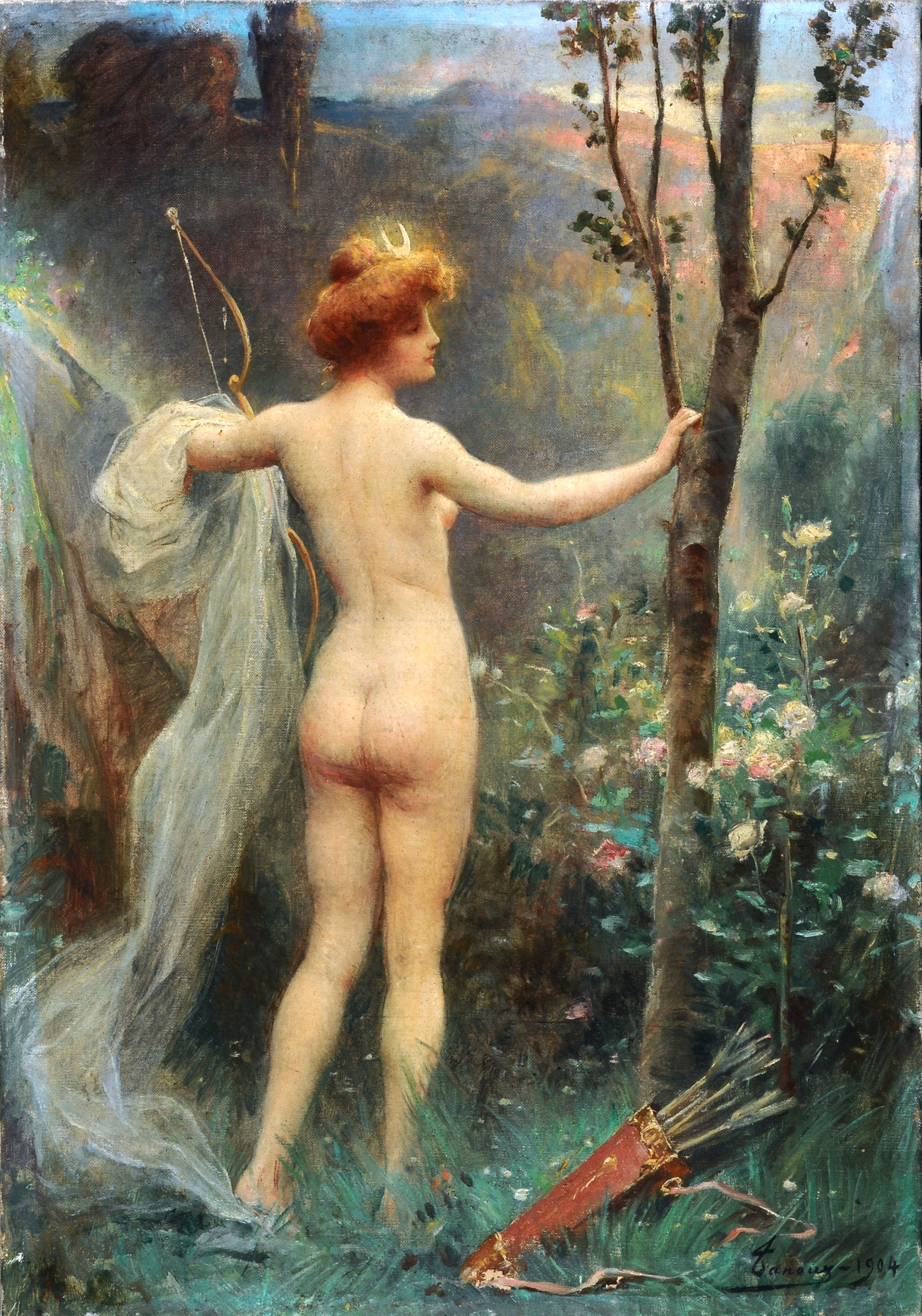
Diana
