= Léon Bonnat =

French painter and educator (1833–1922)

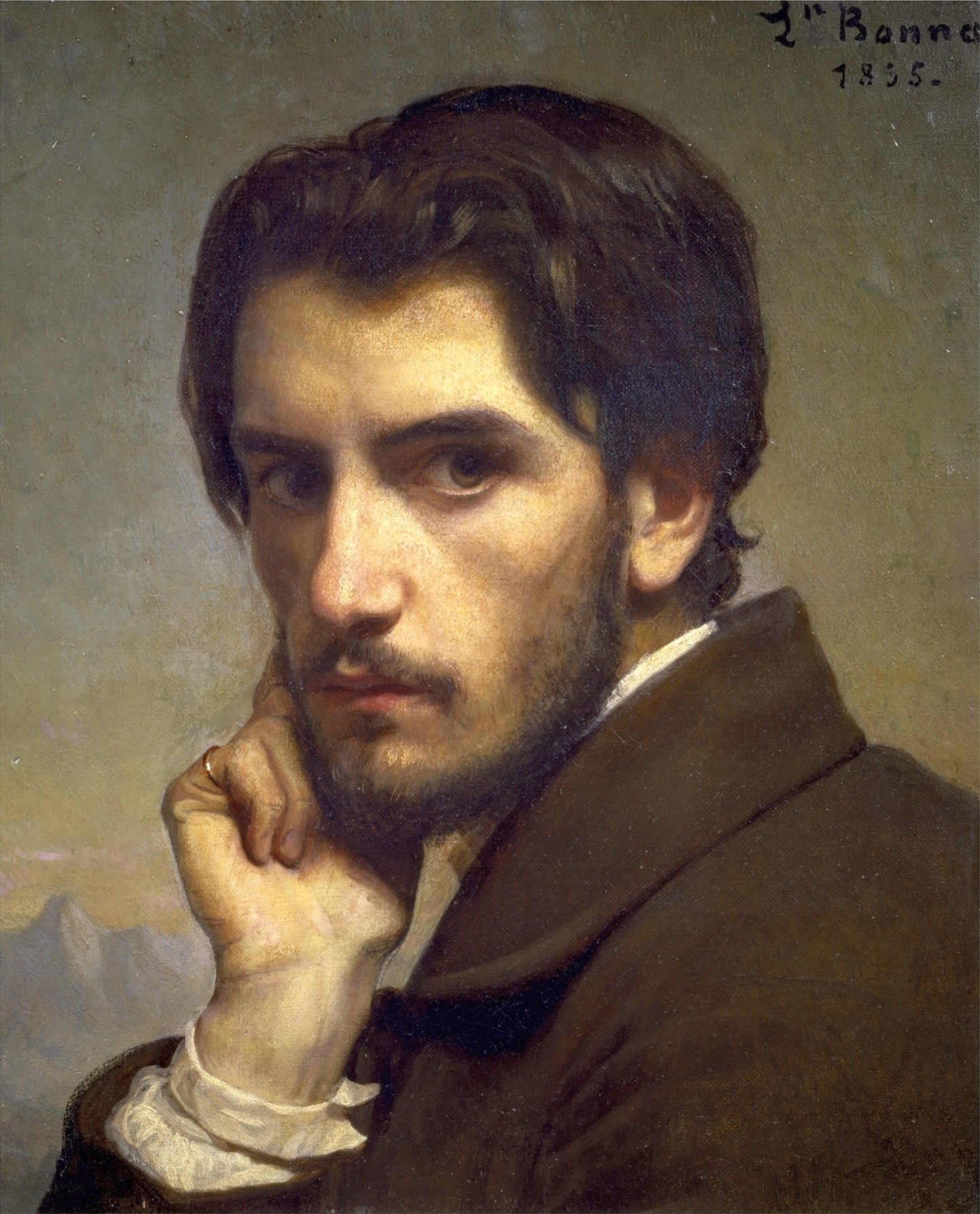
- Self-portrait (c. 1855)
- Born: Léon Joseph Florentin Bonnat; 20 June 1833; Bayonne, France
- Died: 8 September 1922 (aged 89); Monchy-Saint-Éloi, France
- Known for: Painter

Léon Joseph Florentin Bonnat (French pronunciation: [leɔ̃ ʒozɛf flɔʁɑ̃tɛ̃ bɔna]; 20 June 1833 – 8 September 1922) was a French painter, Grand Officer of the Légion d'honneur, art collector and professor at the Ecole des Beaux Arts.

== Early life ==
Bonnat was born in Bayonne, but from 1846 to 1853 he lived in Madrid, where his father owned a bookshop. While tending his father's shop, he copied engravings of works by the Old Masters, developing a passion for drawing. In Madrid, he received his artistic training under Madrazo. He later worked in Paris, where he became known as a leading portraitist, never without a commission. His many portraits show the influence of Velázquez, Jusepe de Ribera and other Spanish masters, as well as Titian and Van Dyke, whose works he studied in the Prado, which placed him at the forefront of painting in France in the 1850s, opposing neoclassicism and academicism. Following the period in Spain, Bonnat worked in the studios of the history painters Paul Delaroche and Leon Cogniet (1854) in Paris. Despite repeated attempts, he failed to win the prix de Rome, finally receiving only a second prize. However, a scholarship from his native Bayonne and support from the Personnaz family allowed him to spend three years in Rome (1858–60) independently, where he and Antonin Personnaz became lifetime friends. During his stay in Rome, he also became friends with Edgar Degas, Gustave Moreau, Jean-Jacques Henner, and the sculptor Henri Chapu.

== Career ==
Bonnat won a medal of honour in Paris in 1869, going on to become one of the leading artists of his day. Bonnat went on to win the Grand Officer of the Légion d'honneur and became a professor at the Ecole des Beaux Arts in 1882. Bonnat was quite popular with American students in Paris. In addition to his native French, he spoke Spanish and Italian and knew English well, to the relief of many monolingual Americans. In May 1905, he succeeded Paul Dubois as director of the Ecole des Beaux-Arts. Julius Kaplan characterised Bonnat as "a liberal teacher who stressed simplicity in art above high academic finish, as well as overall effect rather than detail." Bonnat's emphasis on overall effect on the one hand, and rigorous drawing on the other, put him in a middle position with respect to the Impressionists and academic painters like his friend Jean-Léon Gérôme. In 1917, Bonnat was elected into the National Academy of Design as an Honorary Corresponding member.

== Paintings ==
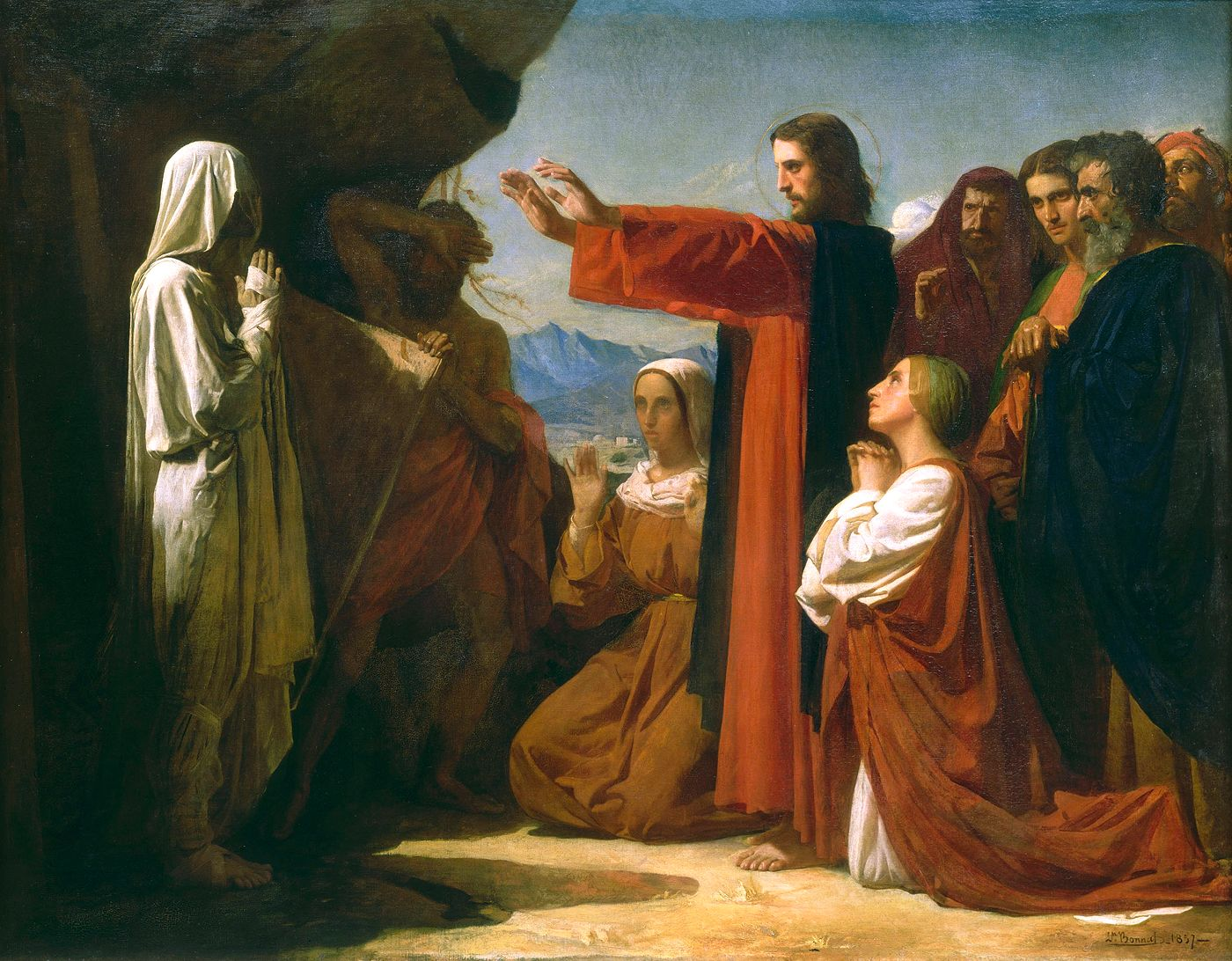
The Resurrection of Lazarus by Bonnat in 1857

Bonnat's vivid portraits of contemporary celebrities are his most characteristic works, but his most important works are arguably his powerful religious paintings, such as his Christ on the Cross (now in the collection of the Musée du Petit Palais in Paris, but not currently on display), Job (in the Musée Bonnat), St Vincent Taking the Place of Two Galley Slaves (at the church of Saint-Nicholas des Champs in Paris), and the large Martyrdom of St Denis for the Pantheon in Paris. However, he received few commissions for religious and historical paintings, and most of his output consists of portraits. He also produced genre paintings of Italian peasants, and a small number of Orientalist scenes.

The writers Émile Zola and Théophile Gautier were among Bonnat's supporters. Gautier hailed him as "the antithesis of Bouguereau," because of the stark naturalism and lack of surface finish that characterize Bonnat's work. Bonnat was an academic painter. He was a member of the Institute, one of the only 14 painters who held administrative power over the Académie des Beaux-Arts and thereby the École des Beaux-Arts. He had friends and connections among the independent artists of his time as well, such as Edgar Degas, whom he met during his stay in Rome and who painted two portraits of Bonnat, and Édouard Manet, who shared his predilection for Spanish painting. He taught with Pierre Puvis de Chavannes in the private atelier he ran before becoming professor at the École. He supported Auguste Rodin's candidacy for the Institut, and defended Gustave Courbet's submissions to the salon.

== Teacher ==
As a teacher, he encouraged freedom of expression and execution. He recommended traveling to Madrid to visit the Prado Museum, and introduced in Paris the tendency to paint in the Spanish way, which influenced the evolution of French painting.

Some of Bonnat's more notable students include: Henri Adrien Tanoux, John Singer Sargent, Stanhope Forbes, Gustave Caillebotte, Prince Eugen, Duke of Närke, Gustaf Cederström, Laurits Tuxen, P. S. Krøyer, Suzor-Coté, Robert Harris, Alfred Philippe Roll, Georges Braque, Thomas Eakins, Raoul Dufy, Jean Béraud, Franklin Brownell, Marius Vasselon, Hubert-Denis Etcheverry, Fred Barnard, Louis Béroud, Paul de la Boulaye, Aloysius O'Kelly, Erik Werenskiold, Graciano Mendilaharzu, Edvard Munch, Alphonse Osbert, Henry Siddons Mowbray, Francis Petrus Paulus, Charles Sprague Pearce, Henri de Toulouse-Lautrec, Manuel Cusí y Ferret, Hyakutake Kaneyuki, Nils Forsberg, Walter Tyndale, Émile-Louis Foubert, Emmanuel Pierre Damoye, Harry Watrous and Louis Van Dievort.

== Later years ==
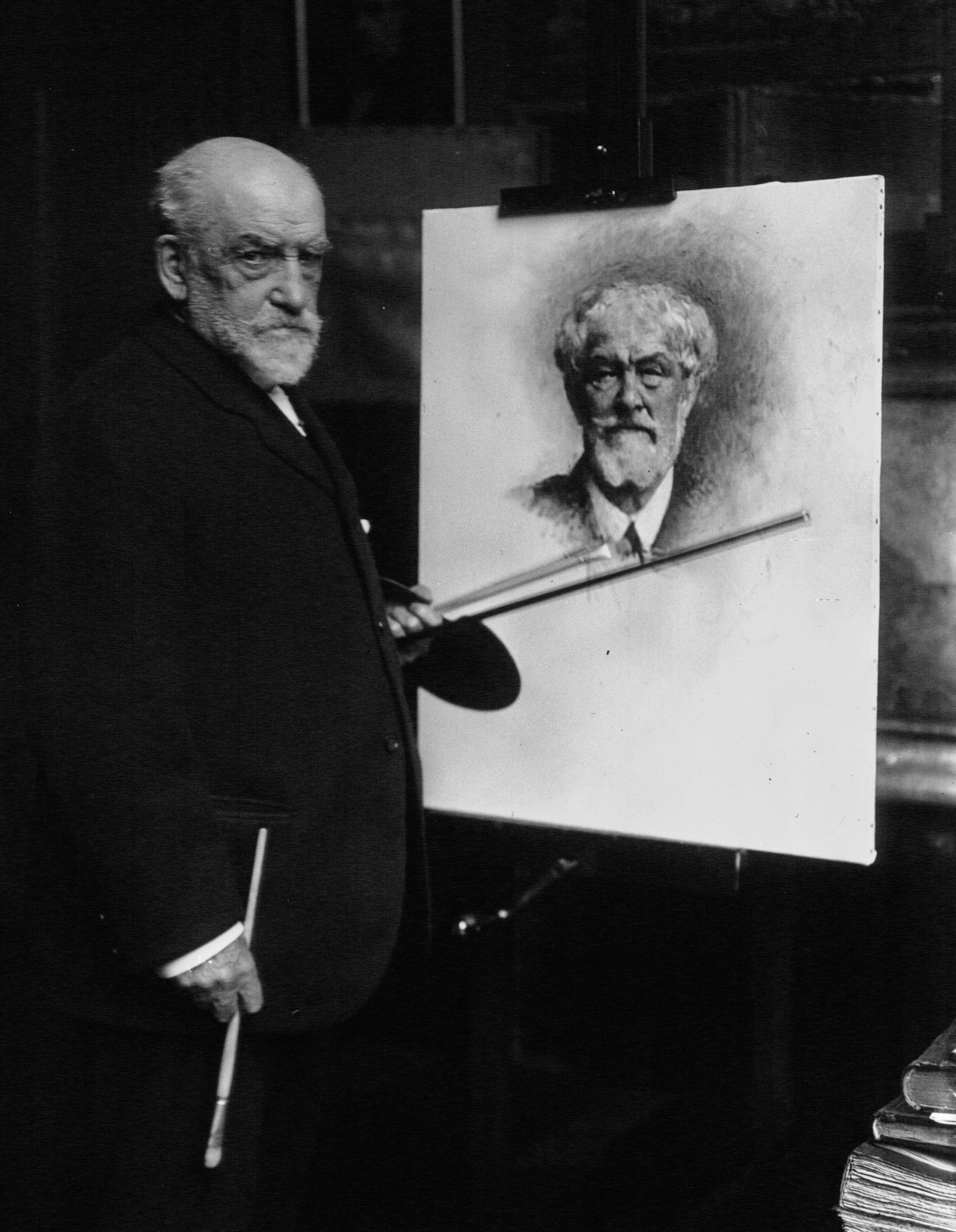
Bonnat painting a portrait of Alfred Roll, 1918

In his last years, his painting evolved, from the influence of seventeenth-century painters and Goya, towards a more modern freedom of execution, scratching the brush and using the spatula, as well as a more colorful color gamut, as can be seen in his Self-portrait at the Prado Museum. In a gesture of gratitude for the help he had been provided in his youth and with the assistance of Antonin Personnaz, Bonnat built a museum in his native city of Bayonne, the Musée Bonnat. Most of the works in the museum are from the personal collections of Bonnat and Personnaz, amassed over a lifetime of travelling around Europe. It includes an exceptionally fine collection of Old Master drawings from Leonardo da Vinci and Michelangelo to Ingres and Géricault. Bonnat died on 8 September 1922 at Monchy-Saint-Éloi, and was buried at the Cimitiére Saint-Etienne, Bayonne.

== Personal life ==
Bonnat never married and lived for much of his life with his mother and sister in the Place Vintimille (renamed Place Adolphe-Max in 1940).

== Honours ==
- 1904: Member of the Royal Academy of Science, Letters and Fine Arts of Belgium.

== Criticisms ==
"We wonder why Velázquez's infant has fake shoulders and why the head doesn't join properly...And how good it looks. While a head by Bonnat joins actual shoulders...And how bad it looks!" – Paul Gauguin (from Ramblings of a Wannabe Painter Publication 2017, David Zwirner Books)

== Gallery ==
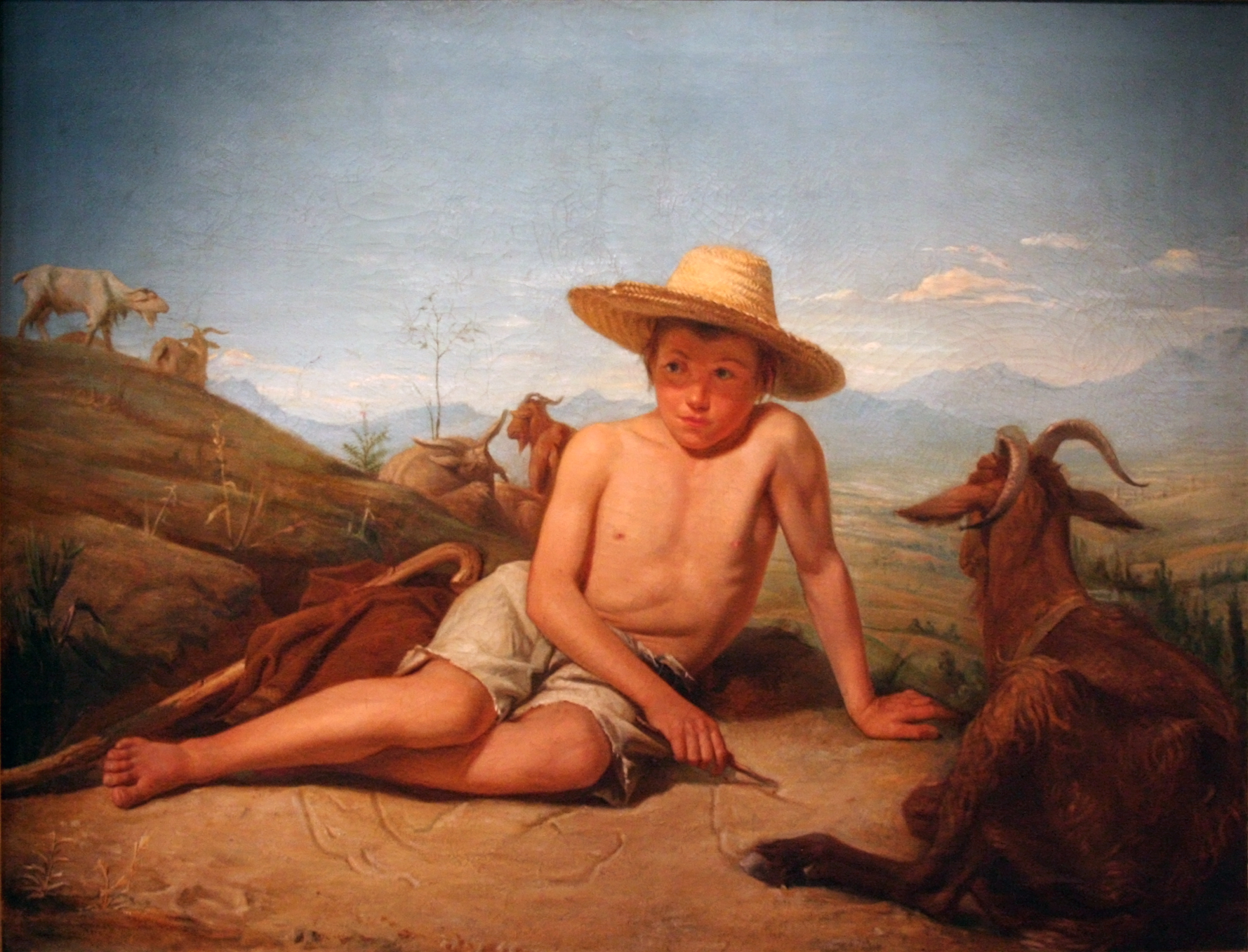
Giotto gardant les chèvres (1850) Musée Bonnat

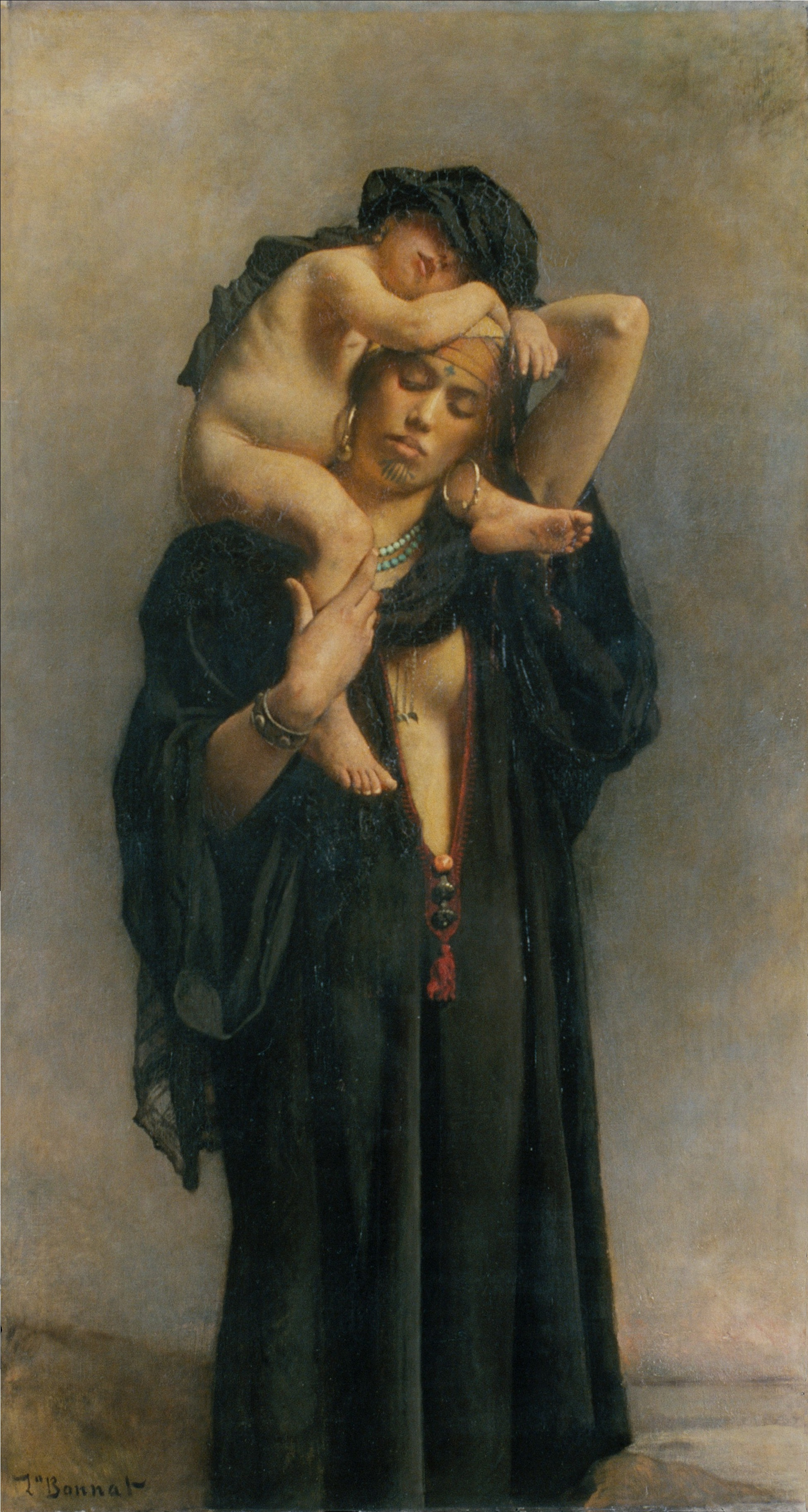
An Egyptian Peasant Woman and Her Child (1869–1870) Metropolitan Museum of Art

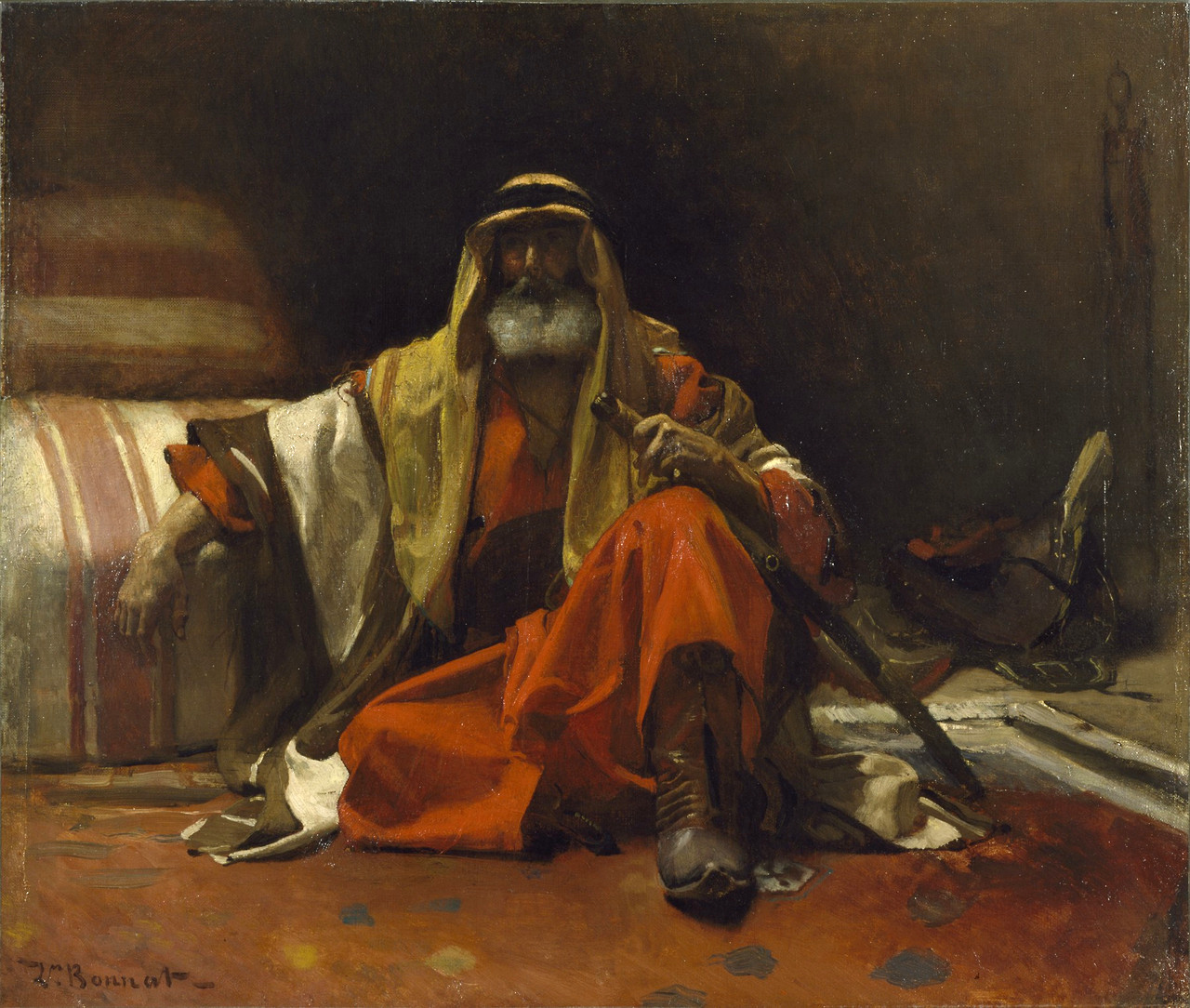
An Arab Sheik (c. 1870) Walters Art Museum

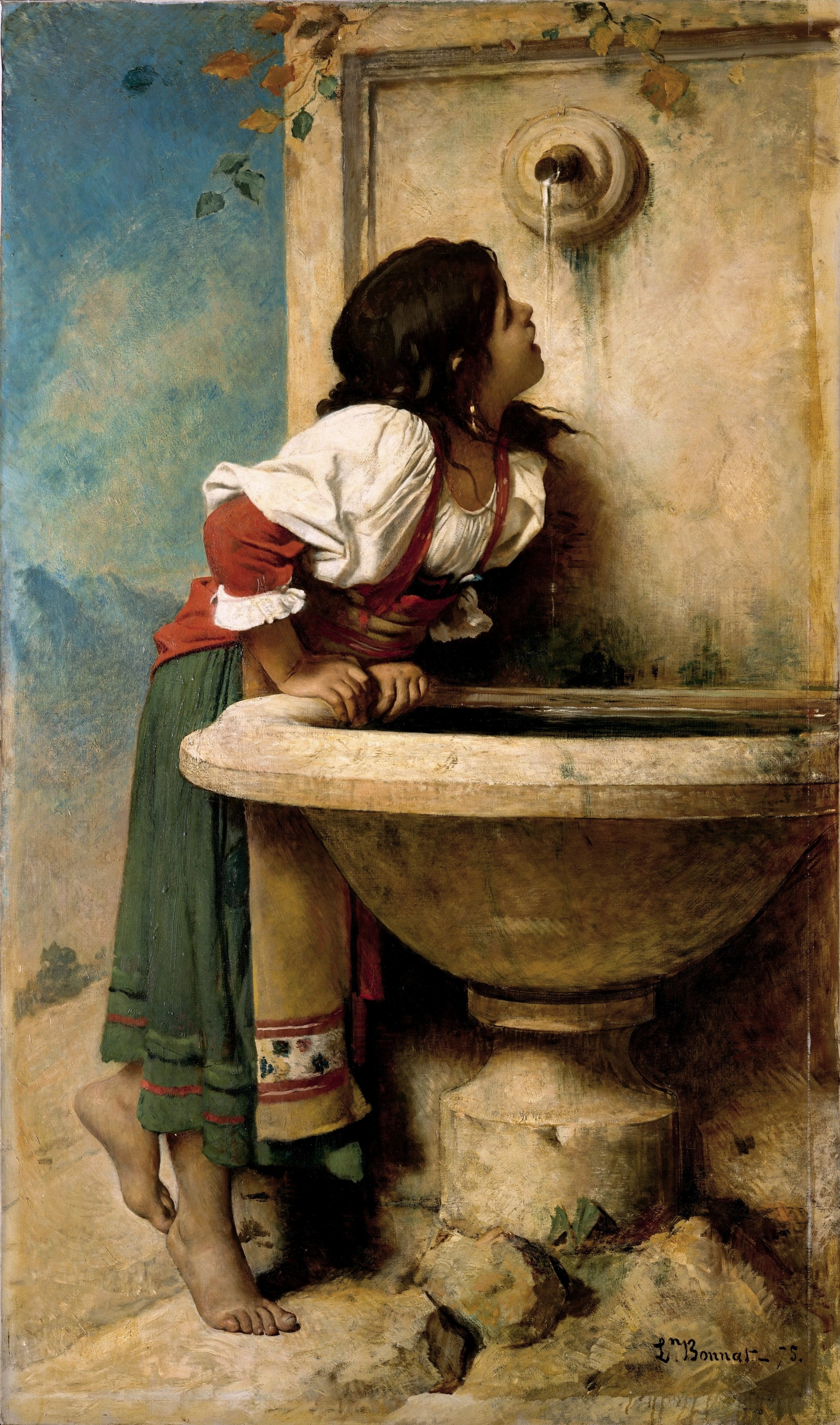
Fille romaine à la fontaine (1875) Metropolitan Museum of Art

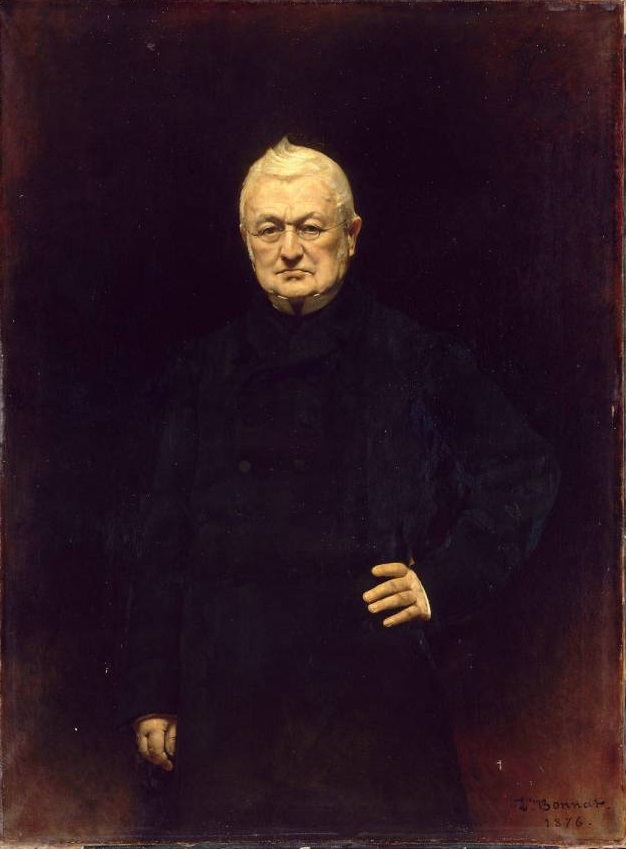
Adolphe Thiers (1876)

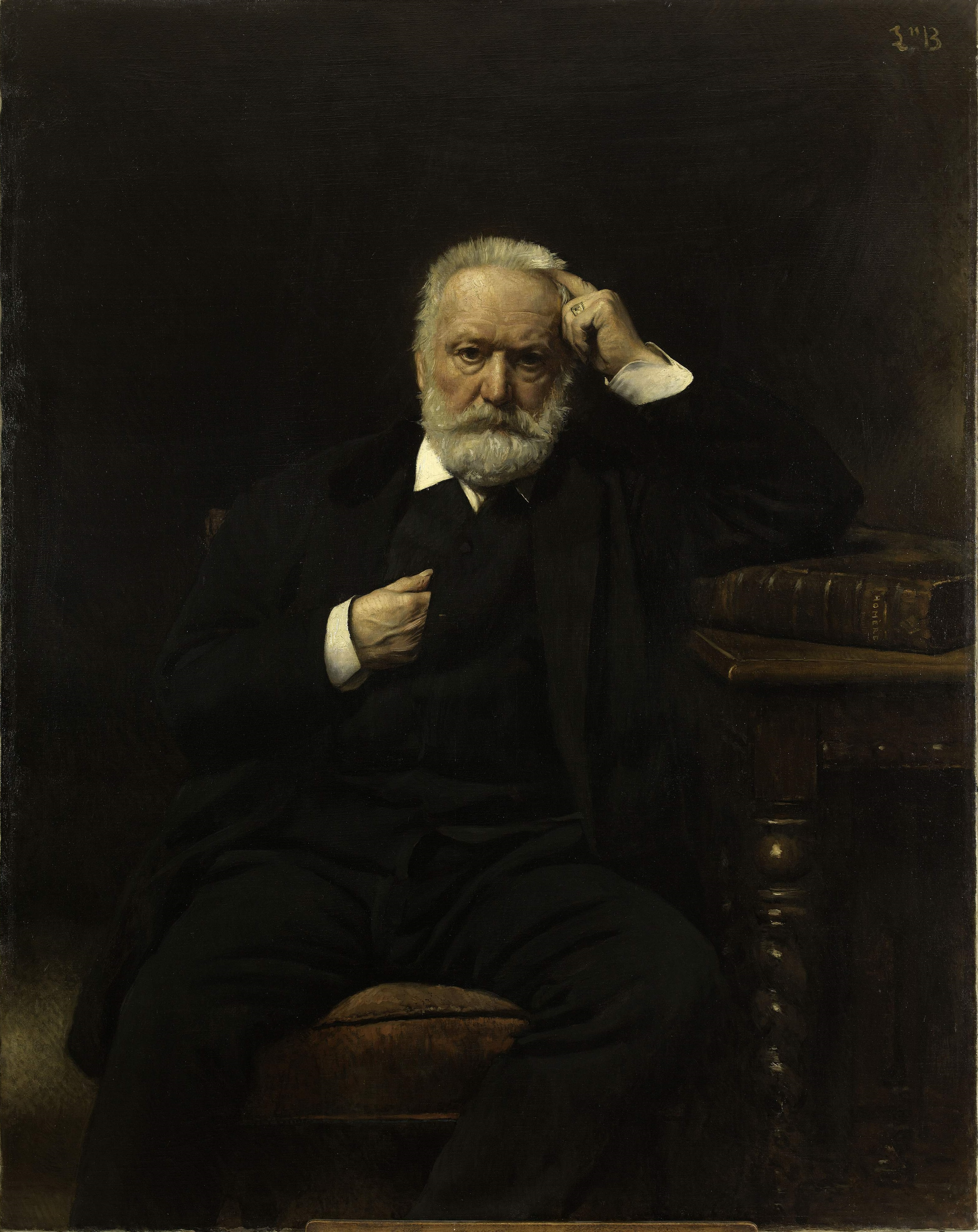
Portrait of Victor Hugo (1879)

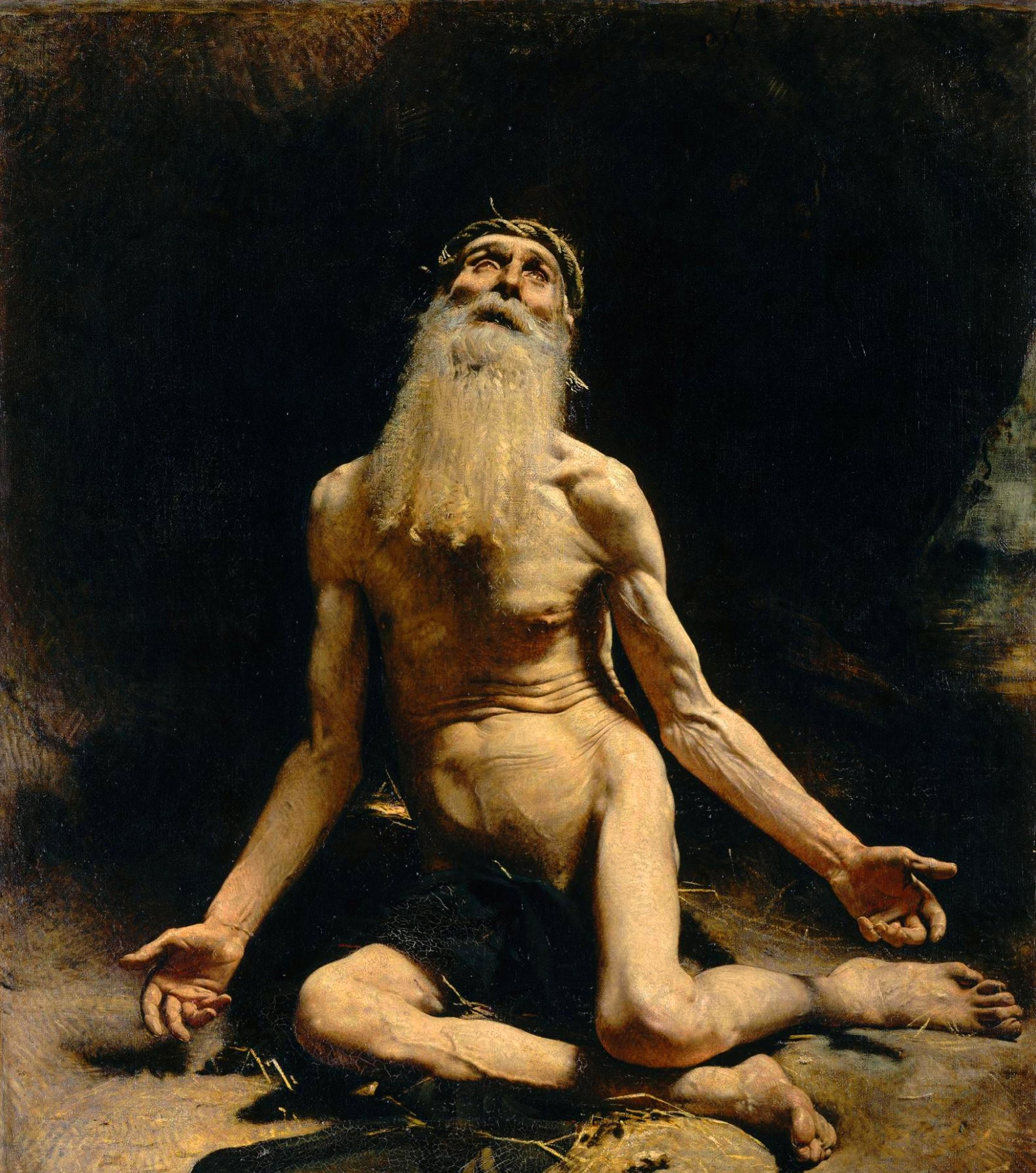
Job (1880)

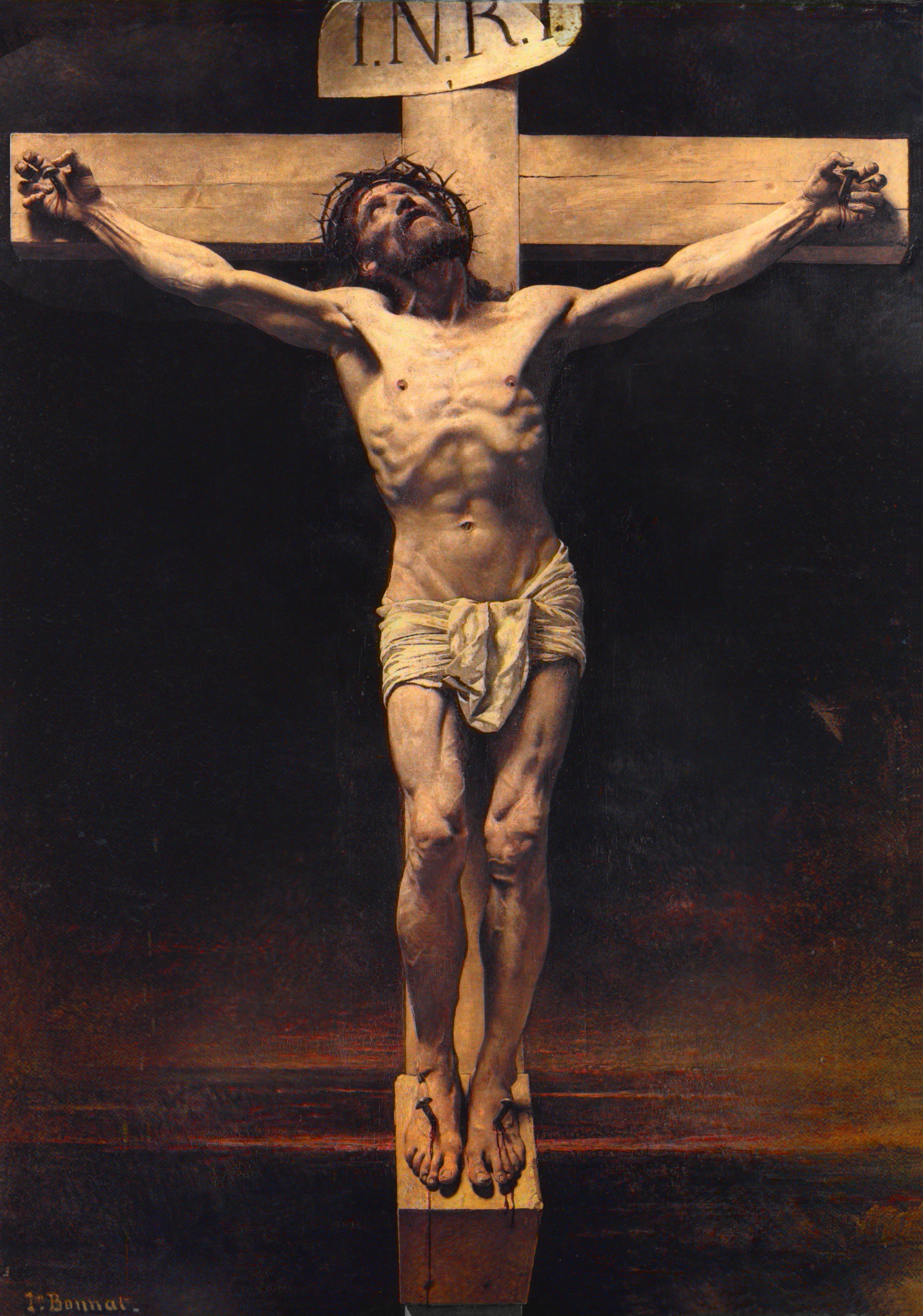
Christ on the Cross (1880)

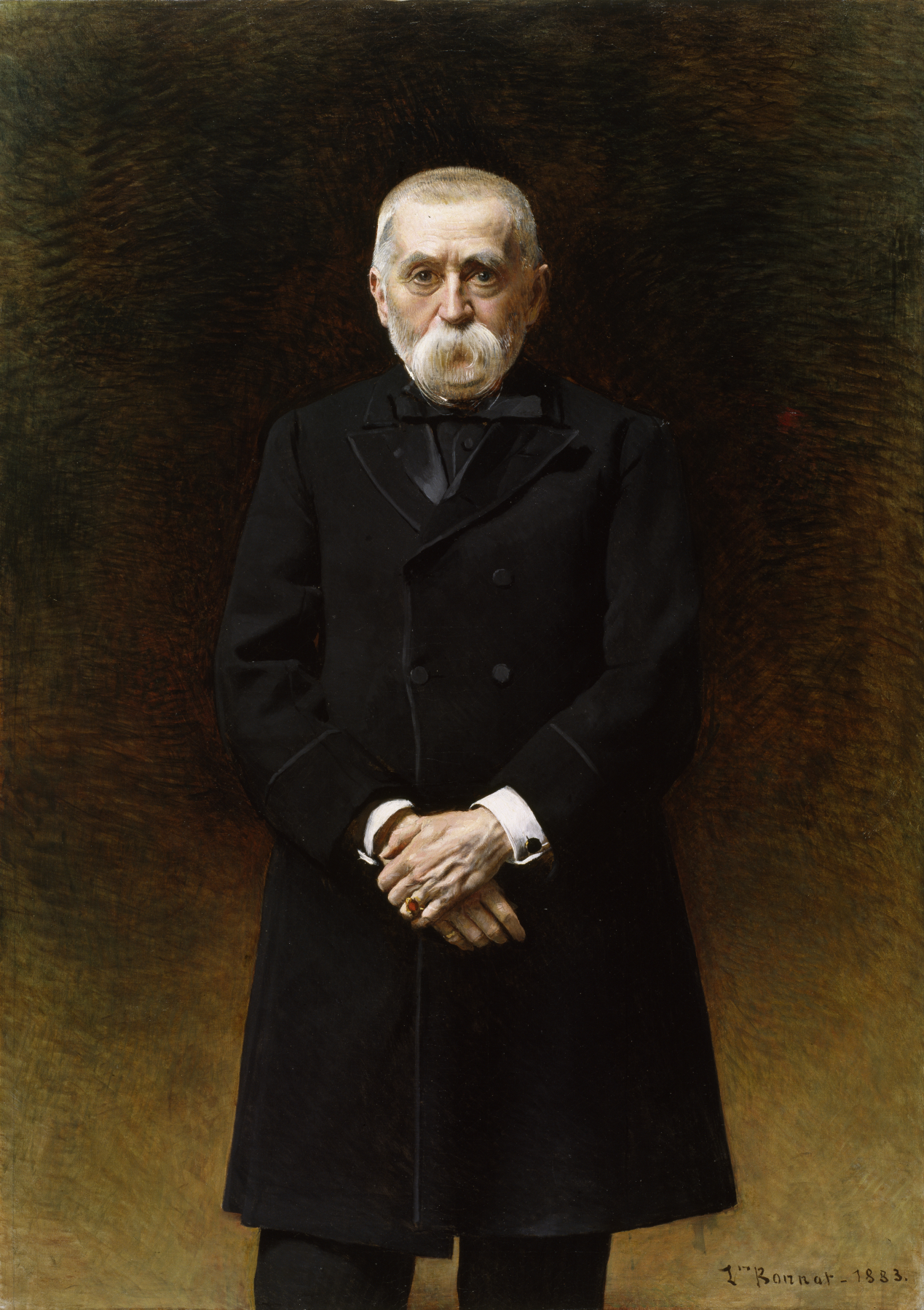
William Thompson Walters (1883) Walters Art Museum

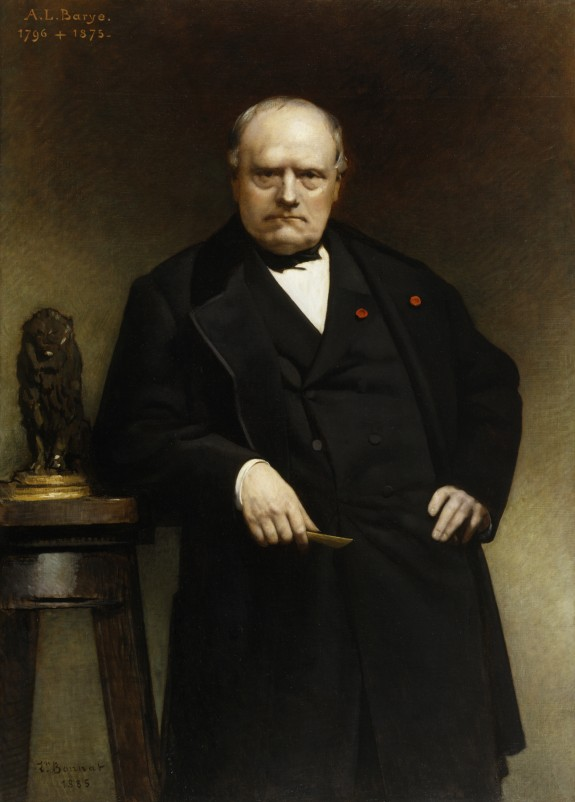
Portrait of Antoine-Louis Barye with a Wax Model of Seated Lion (1868) Walters Art Museum

Self-portrait dedicated to William Walters (1885) Walters Art Museum

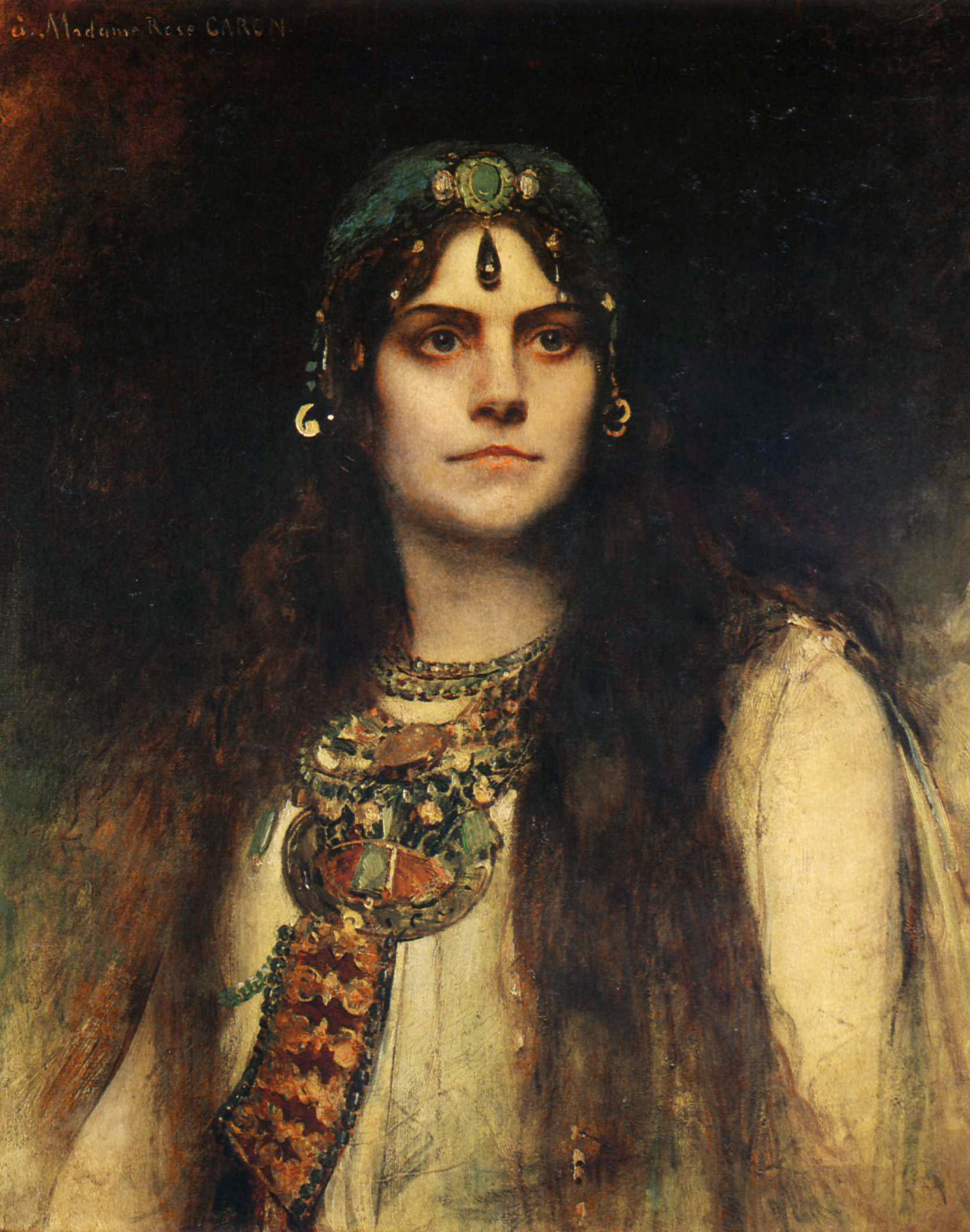
Rose Caron in the role of Salammbo

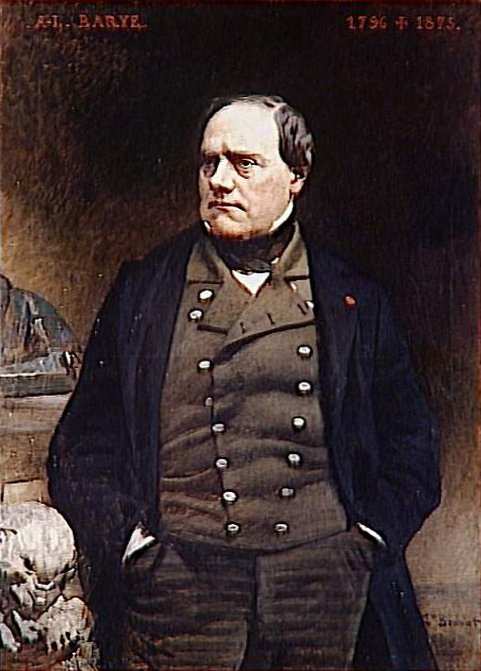
A circa 1865 portrait of sculptor Antoine-Louis Barye

== See also ==
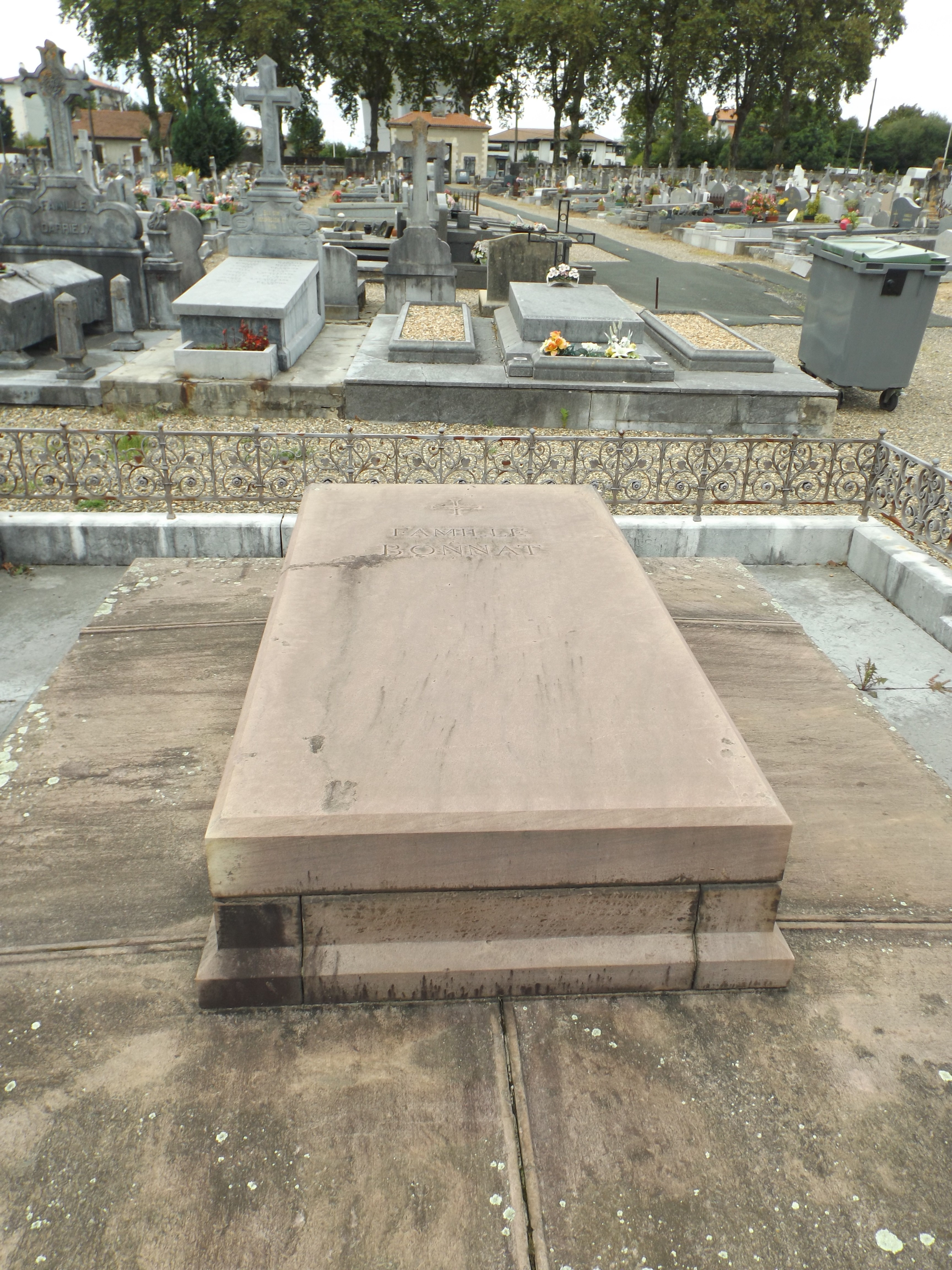
His grave in Bayonne.

- Musée Bonnat
