= Musée Bonnat-Helleu =

Coordinates: 43.4922°N 1.4722°W

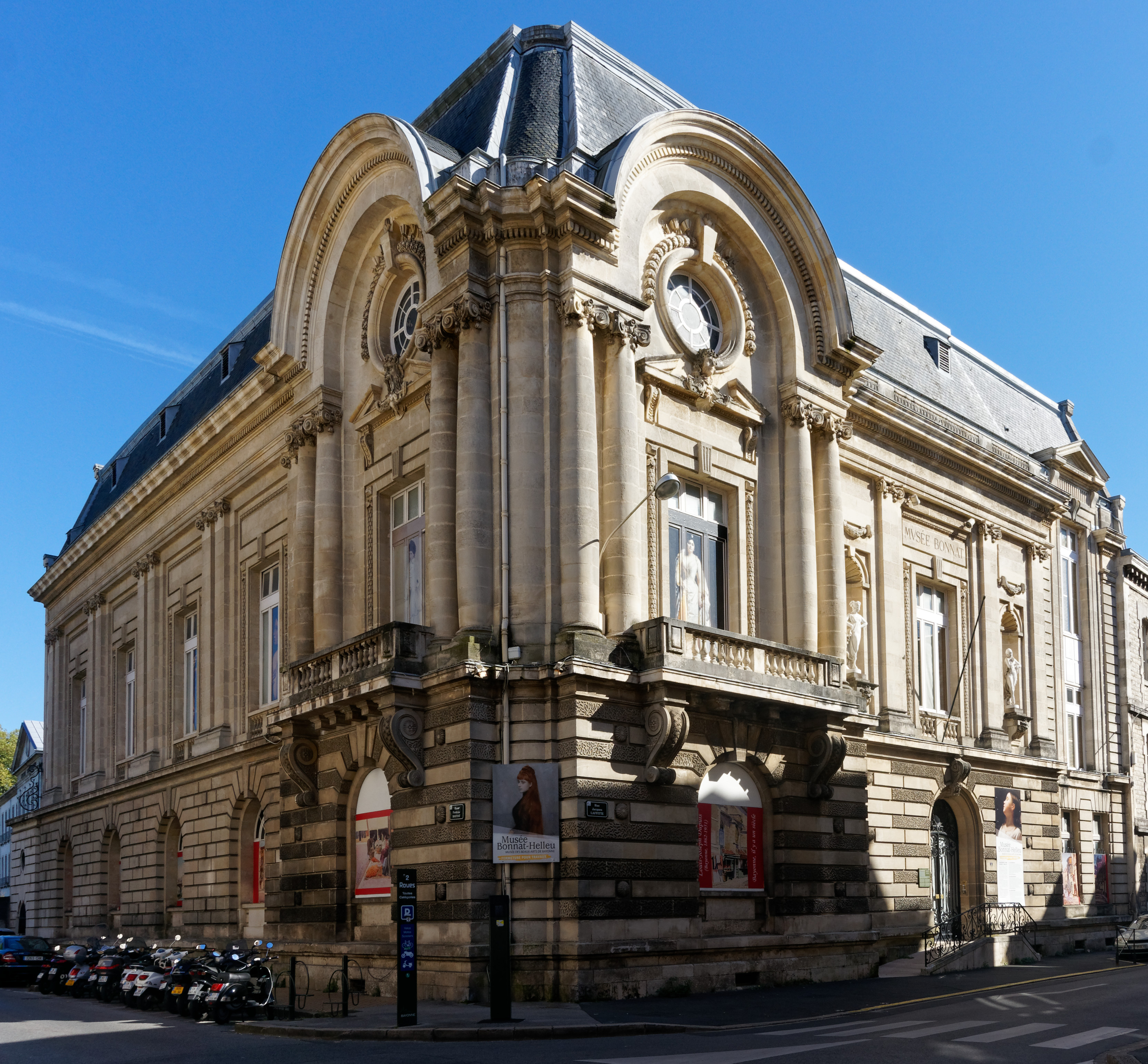
- The Musée Bonnat-Helleu
- Established: 1897-1901
- Location: 5 rue Jacques Laffitte; Bayonne, France
- Type: Art museum
- Director: Barthélemy Etchegoyen Glama
- Curator: Sophie Harent
- Website: https://mbh.bayonne.fr/en/

Atrium of the Musée Bonnat-Helleu, showing Bayonne Triptych by Henri-Achille Zo, and displays from the Mythologies exhibition

The Musée Bonnat-Helleu is an art museum in Bayonne, Nouvelle-Aquitaine, France. The museum was created in 1901 when Bayonne-born painter Léon Bonnat gave his extensive personal collections of art – notably an exceptional drawing collection – as well as many of his paintings to the City of Bayonne. Subsequent donors enriched the collections of the Bonnat Museum with major gifts in 1936, 1989, 1997 and 2010, making its holdings one of the largest collections of art in southern France.

The "Helleu" in its name refers to Paul César Helleu. The museum owns 181 works by Helleu, from a gift in 1989 and then a legacy in 2010 from Paulette Howard-Johnston, daughter of Helleu, and a legacy in 1997 from Ghislaine de Kermaingant.

The Museum was closed to the public for extensive renovation in April 2011. An architectural project to double the size of the museum began in early 2018, and it reopened in November 2025.

== Collections ==
The museum holds more than 6500 works of art including one of the most important collections of Spanish and British painting in France, a collection of 19th-century French painting and one of the finest drawing cabinet in the country after that of the Louvre.

The museum displays paintings by El Greco, Jusepe de Ribera, Bartolomé Esteban Murillo, Francisco de Goya, Van Dyck, Rembrandt, Filippo Lippi, Giambattista Tiepolo, Joshua Reynolds, Thomas Lawrence, John Constable, J. M. W. Turner and numerous studies by Rubens. French masters of the 19th century are represented by Boudin, Corot, Courbet, David, Degas, Delacroix, Géricault, Girodet, Ingres, Puvis de Chavannes and Bonnat himself.

The drawing cabinet is unique in its kind outside Paris with more than 3500 works including drawings by Le Lorrain, Charles Le Brun, Jean-Honoré Fragonard, François Boucher, Antoine Watteau, Hubert Robert, Ingres, Jacques-Louis David, Géricault, Delacroix, Albrecht Dürer, Rembrandt, Perugino, Pisanello, Luca Signorelli, Domenico Ghirlandaio, Leonardo da Vinci, Giovanni Bellini, Sandro Botticelli, Raphael, Michelangelo, Giulio Romano, Titian, Parmigianino, Correggio, Primaticcio, Paolo Veronese, Federico Barocci, Annibale Carracci, Guercino, Pietro da Cortona, Francesco Guardi, Giovanni Battista Piranesi, Francisco de Goya, and others.

There are also collections of decorative arts and antiques.
