= Attichy =

- Commune
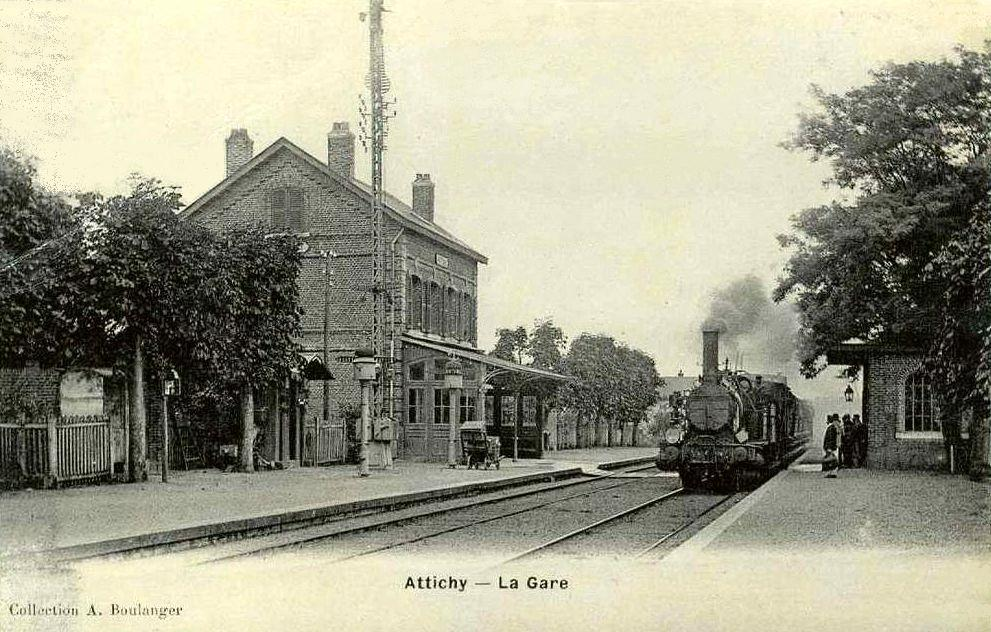
- The railway station in Attichy

- Coat of arms
- Location of Attichy
- Location within France Location within Hauts-de-France
- Coordinates: 49°24′40″N 3°02′53″E
- Country: France
- Region: Hauts-de-France
- Department: Oise
- Arrondissement: Compiègne
- Canton: Compiègne-1
- Intercommunality: CC Lisières Oise

Government
  - Mayor (2020–2026): Bernard Favrole
- Area^{1}: 14.74 km^{2} (5.69 sq mi)
- Elevation: 47 m (154 ft)
- Highest elevation: 140 m (460 ft)
- Lowest elevation: 36 m (118 ft)
- Population (2023): 1,857
  - Density: 126.0/km^{2} (326.3/sq mi)
- Time zone: UTC+01:00 (CET)
  - Summer (DST): UTC+02:00 (CEST)
- INSEE/Postal code: 60025 /60350
- ^{1} French Land Register data, which excludes lakes, ponds, glaciers > 1 km^{2} (0.386 sq mi or 247 acres) and river estuaries.

Attichy (French pronunciation: [atiʃi]) is a commune in the Oise department in northern France. The current village has a bakery, a library with a detailed history during the First and Second World War, a hospital for the elderly, a pizzeria and a town hall with limited tourist information. During the Second World War, the Americans established a Prisoner of War camp at Attichy (Chelles)

Nearby towns: Compiègne, Beauvais, Reims. Closest villages: Couloisy, Jaulzy, Bitry, Berneuil-sur-Aisne, Croutoy, Saint-Pierre-lès-Bitry, Trosly-Breuil.

== Population ==
Historical population
Year	Pop.	±% p.a.
1968	1,391	—
1975	1,545	+1.51%
1982	1,616	+0.64%
1990	1,651	+0.27%
1999	1,852	+1.28%
2007	1,926	+0.49%
2012	1,887	−0.41%
2017	1,880	−0.07%
2023	1,857	−0.20%
Source: INSEE

== See also ==
- Communes of the Oise department
