= Ballay =

- Commune
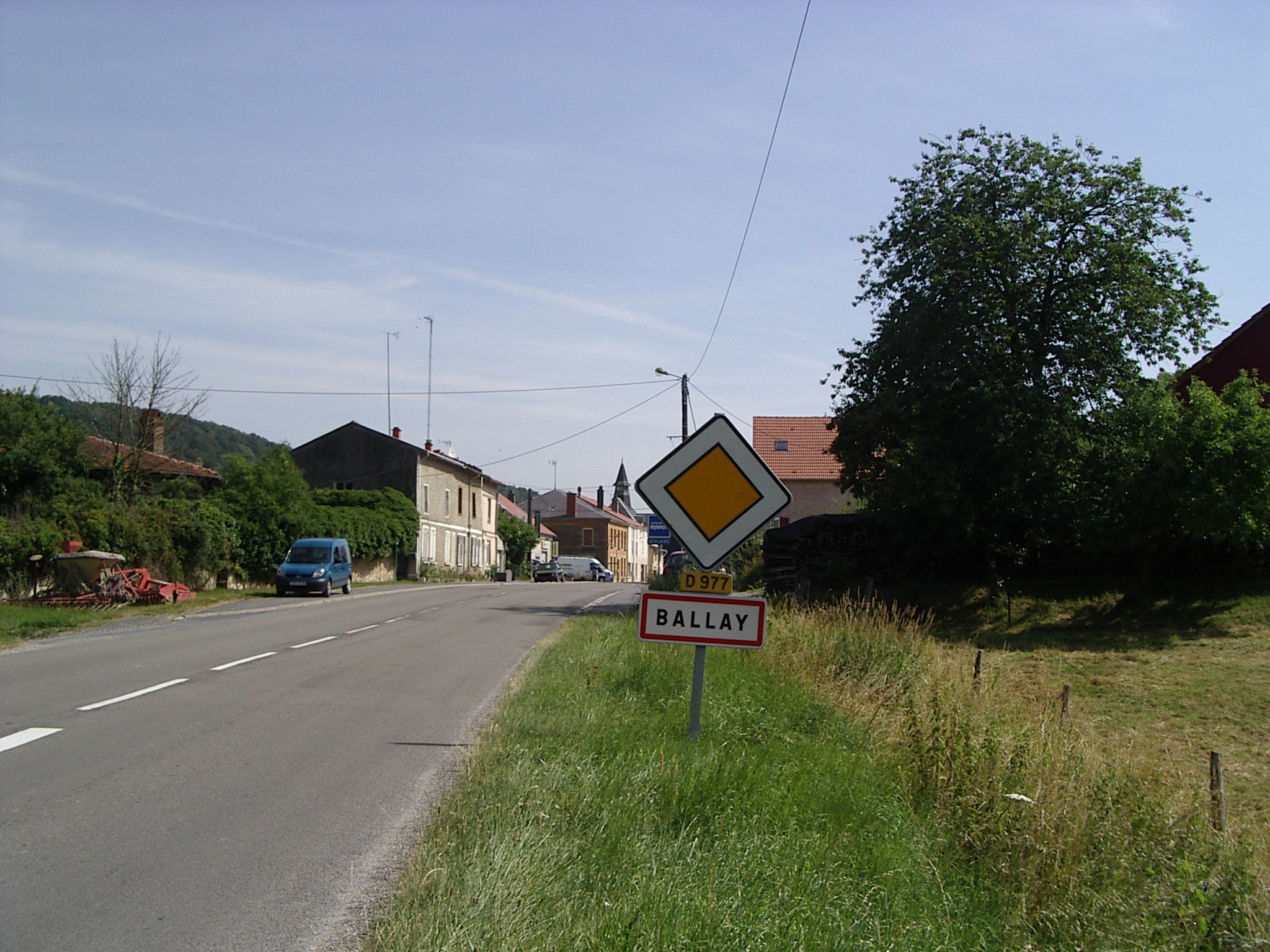
- Entrance to Ballay
- Location of Ballay
- Location within France Location within Grand Est
- Coordinates: 49°25′51″N 4°45′00″E
- Country: France
- Region: Grand Est
- Department: Ardennes
- Arrondissement: Vouziers
- Canton: Vouziers
- Intercommunality: Argonne Ardennaise

Government
  - Mayor (2020–2026): Philippe Thirriard
- Area^{1}: 10.46 km^{2} (4.04 sq mi)
- Elevation: 100 m (330 ft)
- Highest elevation: 221 m (725 ft)
- Lowest elevation: 91 m (299 ft)
- Population (2023): 242
  - Density: 23.1/km^{2} (59.9/sq mi)
- Time zone: UTC+01:00 (CET)
  - Summer (DST): UTC+02:00 (CEST)
- INSEE/Postal code: 08045 /08400
- ^{1} French Land Register data, which excludes lakes, ponds, glaciers > 1 km^{2} (0.386 sq mi or 247 acres) and river estuaries.

Ballay (French pronunciation: [balɛ]) is a commune in the Ardennes department in the Grand Est region of northern France.

== Geography ==
Ballay is located some 35 km east by south-east of Rethel and 3 km north of Vouziers. Access to the commune is by the D977 road from Vouziers which passes through the centre of the commune and the village and continues north to Quatre-Champs. The D19 road from Quatre-Champs to Vandy forms part of the northern border of the commune. Apart from the village there are the hamlets of Claire-Fontaine, Landèves, and La Noue Adam. The commune is mostly forested in the east and west with farmland down the centre.

The Aisne river forms the south-western border of the commune as it flows north to eventually join the Oise at Clairoix. The Fournelles flows through the centre of the commune from the north and joins the Aisne on the south-western border. Several tributaries rise in the commune and feed the Fournelles including the Martignère, the Ruisseau du Moulin des Bois, and the Chalan which forms part of the southern border of the commune.

Clairefontaine and Landèves were municipalities in 1790 and merged into Ballay at the end of 1790.

== History ==
In the 12th century Ballay was a lordship with a castle and a parish with a church dedicated to Notre-Dame which was an annex to Vandy. An Augustinian Priory, Notre-Dame of Landèves, was founded at Landèves in 1219 by two brother lords of Bally who made it religious. Since its foundation the priory served the parish of Ballay. The priory became an abbey in 1623. The abbey and church were destroyed during the French Revolution.

== Administration ==
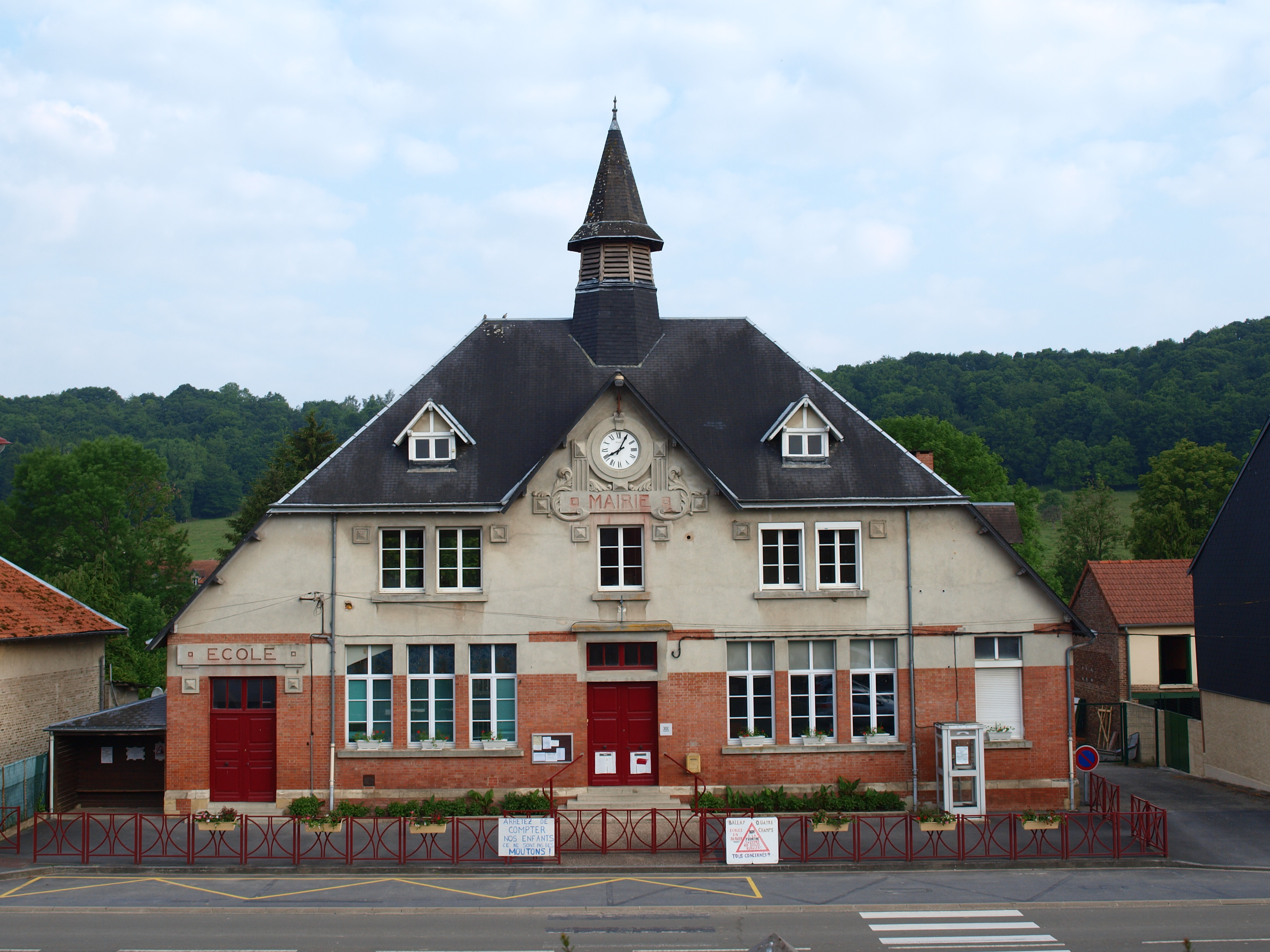
The Town Hall

List of Successive Mayors

From	To	Name
1995	2008	Jean-Luc Payer
2008	2020	Christian Mielcarek
2020	2026	Philippe Thirriard

== Demography ==
The inhabitants of the commune are known as Ballayriots or Ballayriottes in French.

Historical population

Year	Pop.	±% p.a.
1793	434	—
1800	502	+2.10%
1806	490	−0.40%
1821	447	−0.61%
1831	461	+0.31%
1836	473	+0.52%
1841	475	+0.08%
1846	473	−0.08%
1851	471	−0.08%
1866	417	−0.81%
1872	390	−1.11%
1876	375	−0.98%
1881	350	−1.37%
1886	382	+1.77%
1891	374	−0.42%
1896	373	−0.05%
1901	336	−2.07%
1906	332	−0.24%

Year	Pop.	±% p.a.
1911	346	+0.83%
1921	331	−0.44%
1926	303	−1.75%
1931	283	−1.36%
1936	300	+1.17%
1946	307	+0.23%
1954	290	−0.71%
1962	315	+1.04%
1968	267	−2.72%
1975	265	−0.11%
1982	230	−2.00%
1990	254	+1.25%
1999	245	−0.40%
2007	242	−0.15%
2012	247	+0.41%
2017	289	+3.19%
2023	242	−2.91%

Source: EHESS and INSEE

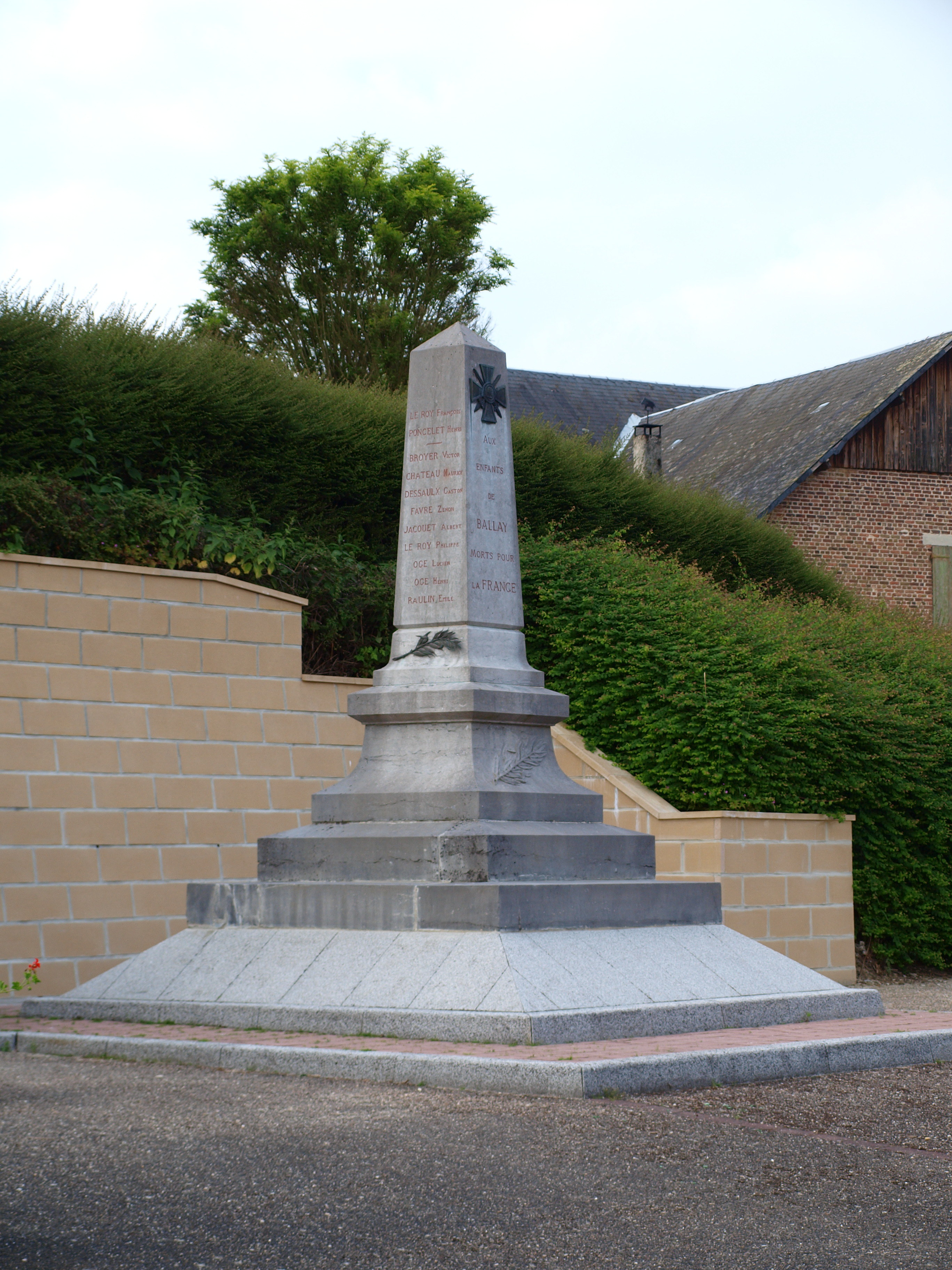
The War Memorial

== Sites and monuments ==
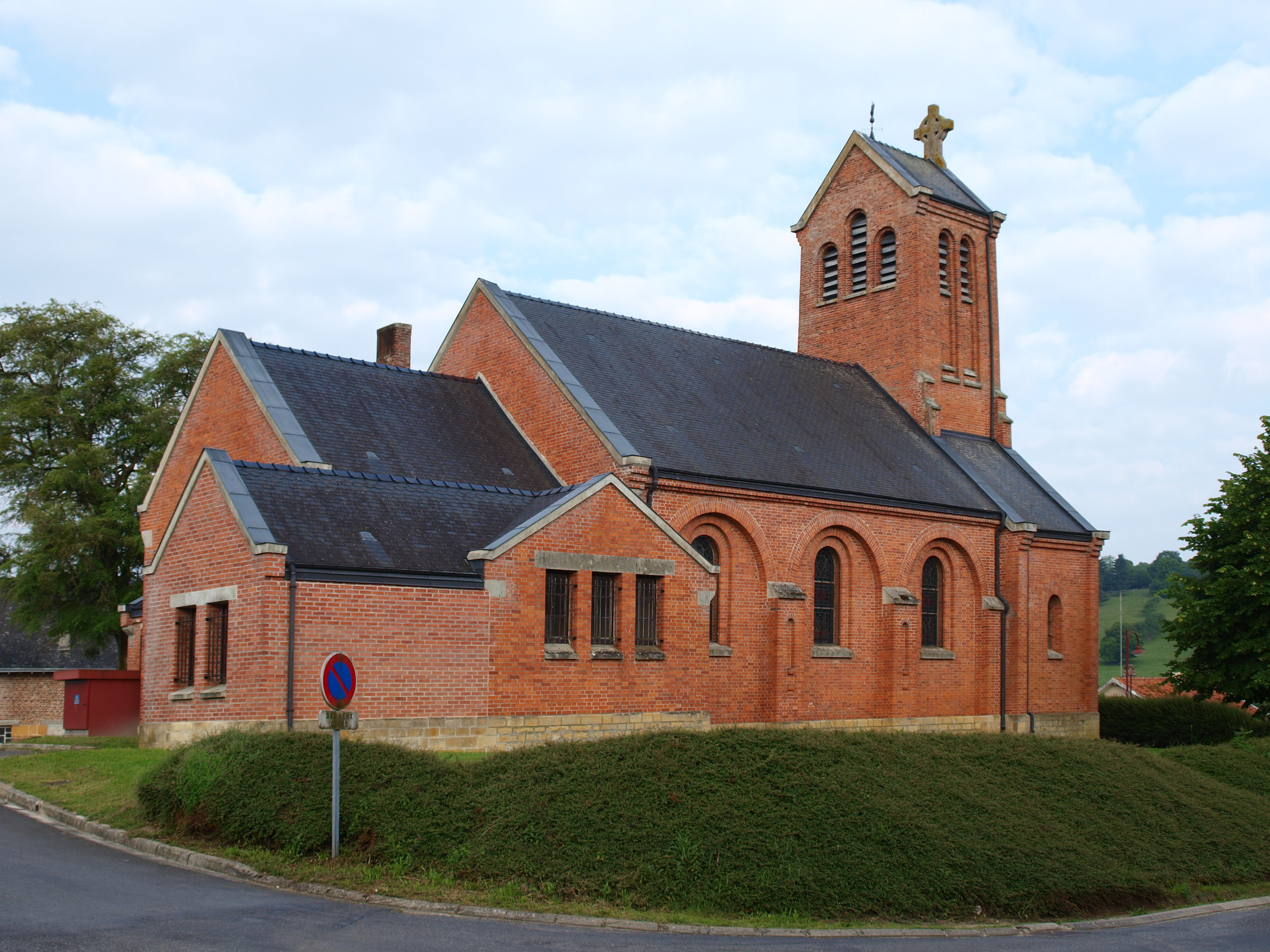
The Church of Notre-Dame

- The Town Hall/School at Rue Notre-Dame (1925)
- The Church of Notre-Dame at Rue Notre-Dame (1925)
- A Flour Mill at Landèves (1921) The Flour Mill contains several items that are registered as historical objects:
  - A Separator Machine (20th century)
  - A Grinding Machine (20th century)
  - A Cleaning Machine (20th century)
  - An Ossberger Hydraulic Turbine (1922)

== See also ==
- Communes of the Ardennes department

=== External links ===
- Ballay on the old National Geographic Institute website (in French)
- Ballay on Géoportail, National Geographic Institute (IGN) website (in French)
- Balay on the 1750 Cassini Map
