= Bitry =

Bitry is the name or part of the name of the following communes in France:

- Bitry, Nièvre, in the Nièvre department
- Bitry, Oise, in the Oise department
- Saint-Pierre-lès-Bitry, in the Oise department
