= Château du Francport =

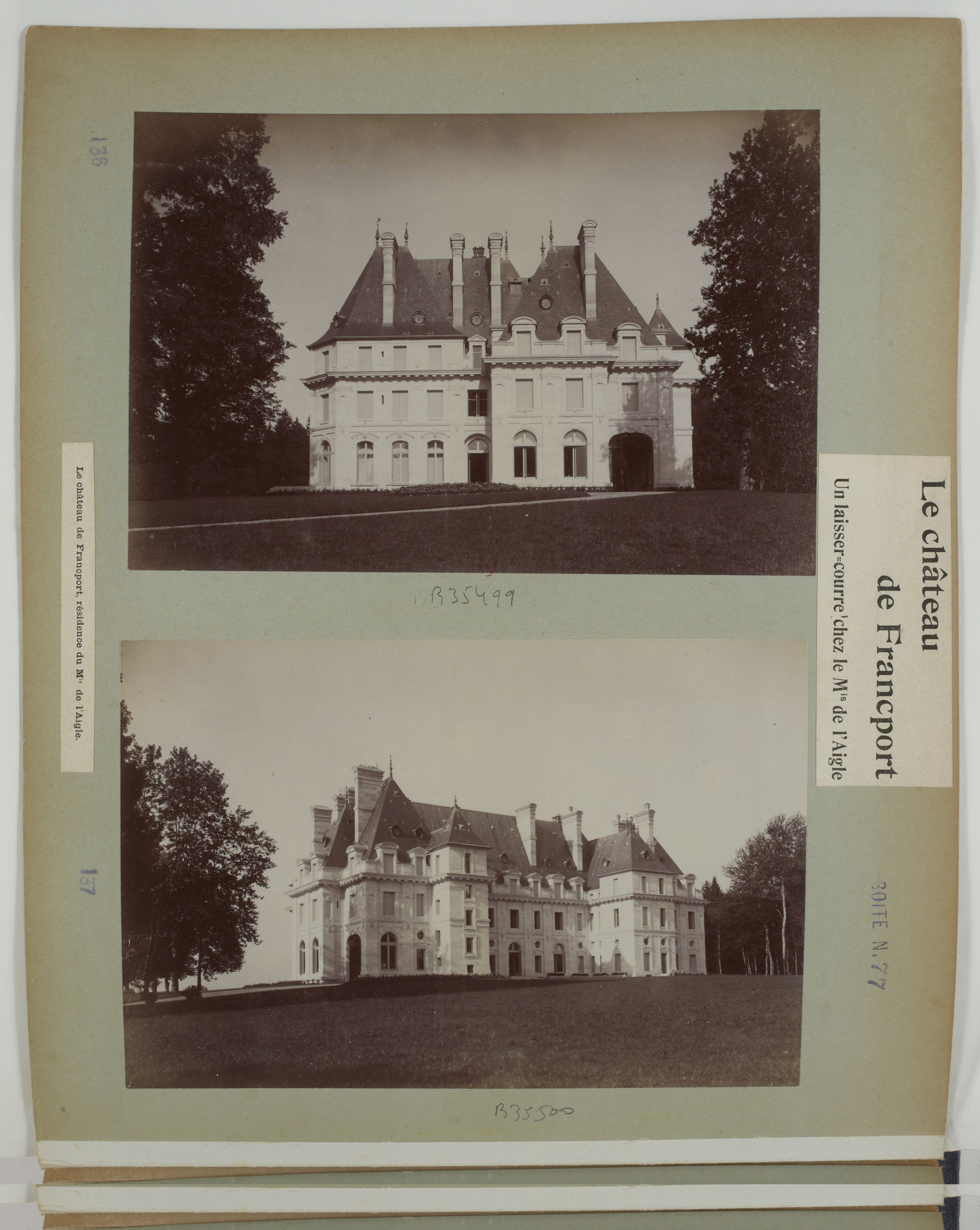
- Two photographs taken in 1899
- Interactive map of the Château du Francport area

General information
- Type: Château
- Location: Choisy-au-Bac, France
- Coordinates: 49.4350°N 2.9218°E
- Completed: 19th century

The Château du Francport is an historic château in Choisy-au-Bac, Oise, Hauts-de-France, France. It was built in the 19th century. A photograph taken by Count Olympe Aguado is in the collection of the J. Paul Getty Museum in Los Angeles, California.

According to photographer Edward O. Haars for the War Department, this building is where German emissaries were housed during the Armistice negotiations in November 1918 at the Forest of Compiègne. See photos attached with NARA source on the images.

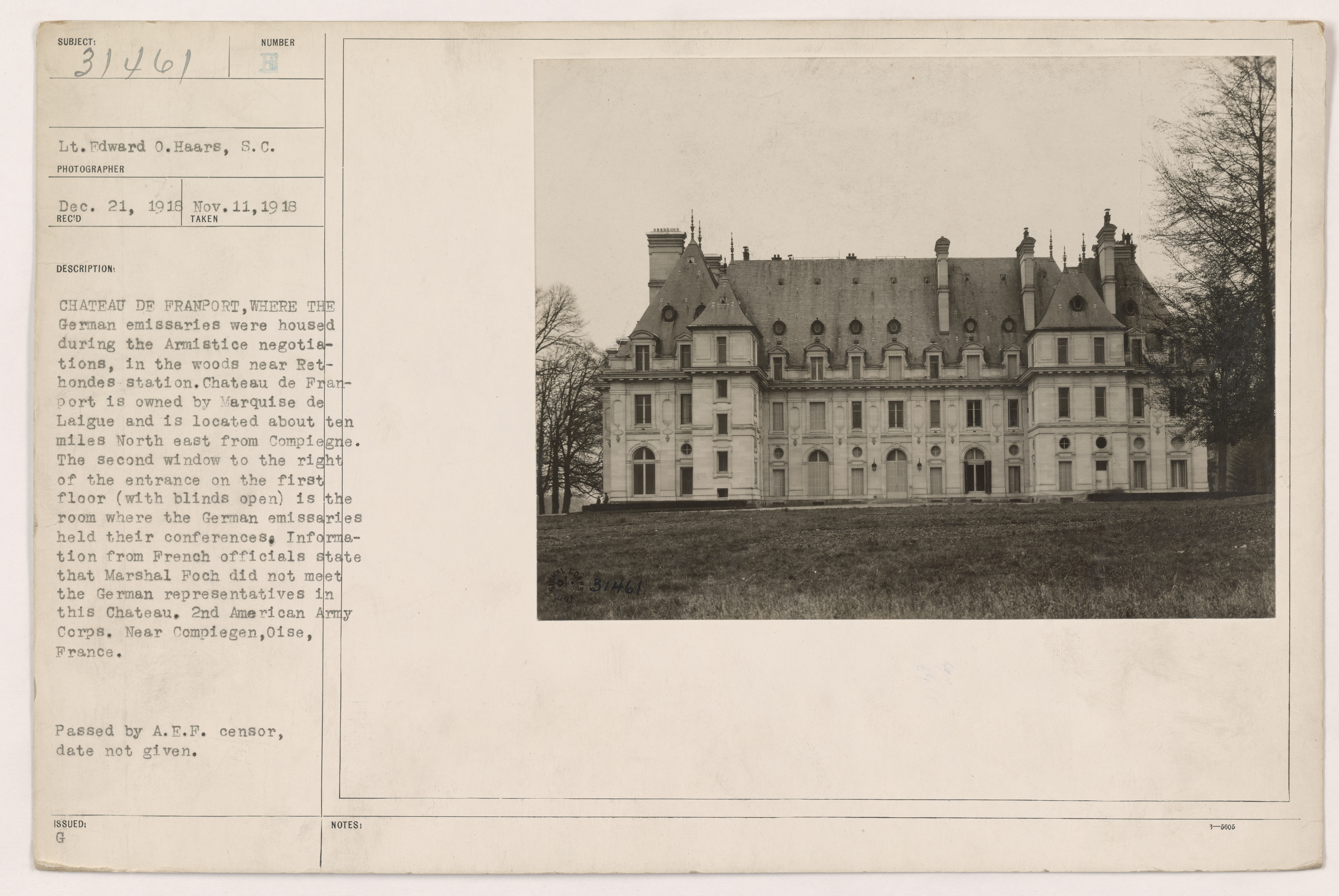

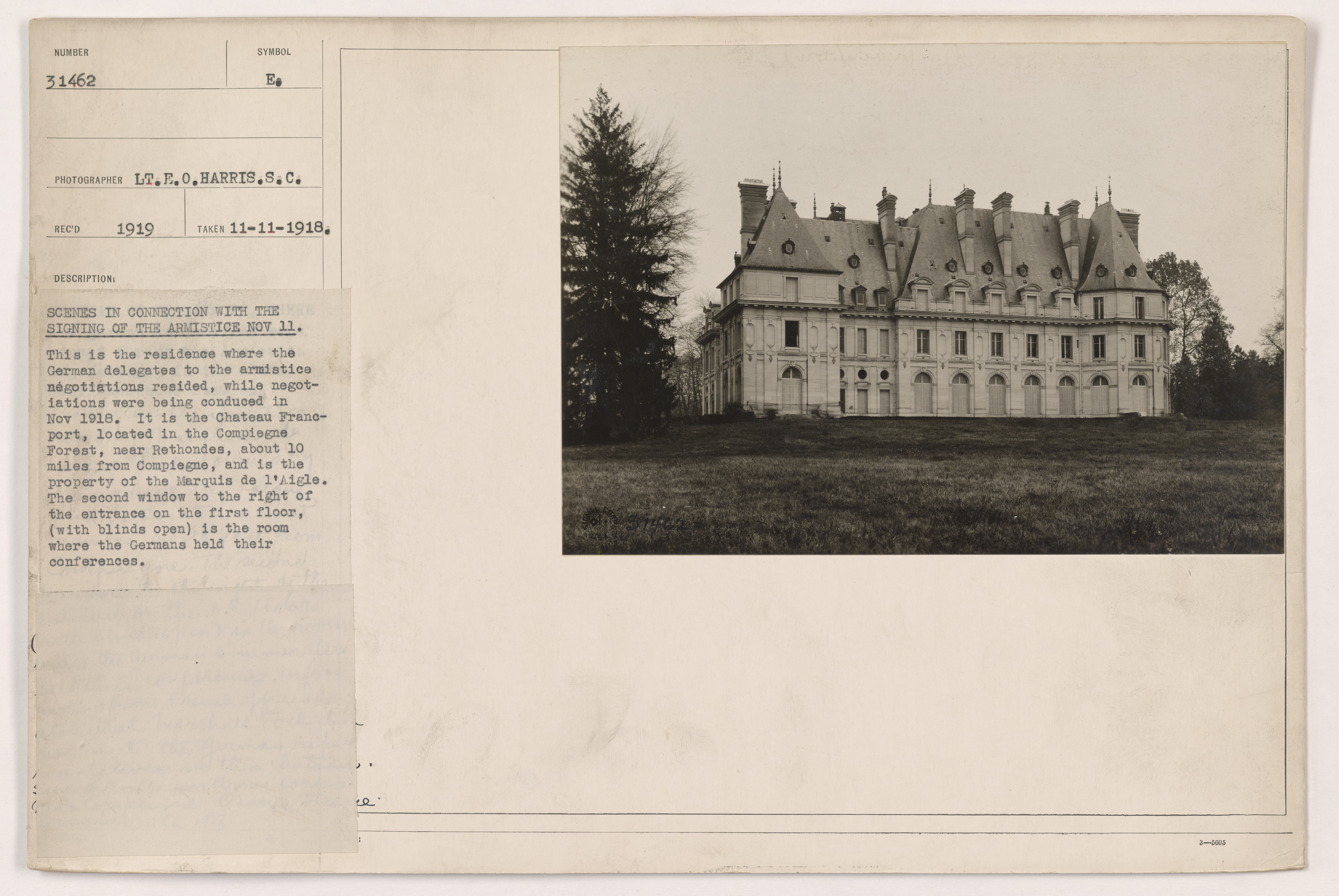

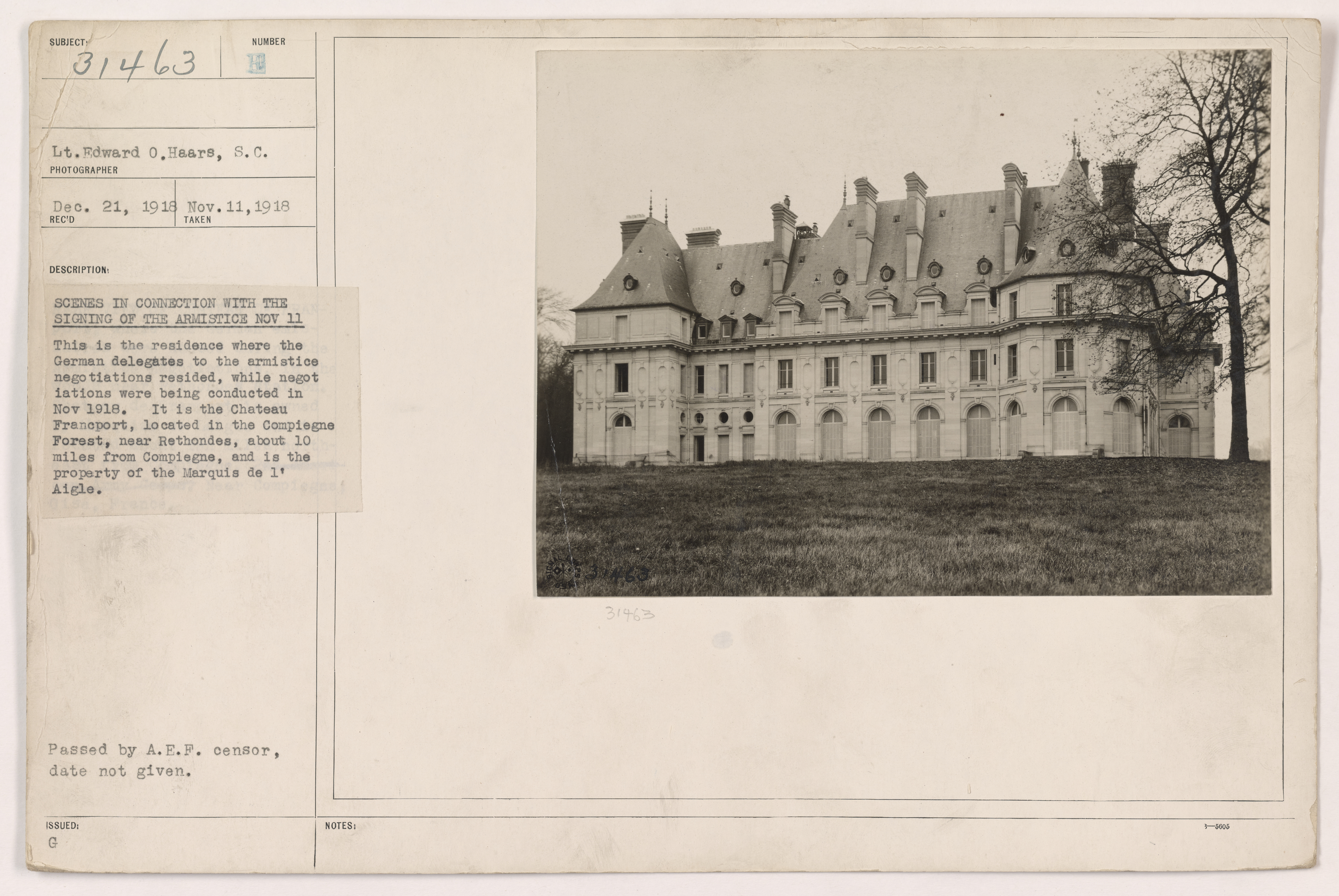

Acquired by the Anglo-French Hotel Management Limited to turn it into a luxury hotel, the project fell through in 2009. However, by 2014 it was owned by Terres de Kéops and run as a restaurant known as the Château des Bonshommes.

== External Sources ==
- SOCIÉTÉ HISTORIQUE DE COMPIÈGNE
