= Vassens =

- Commune
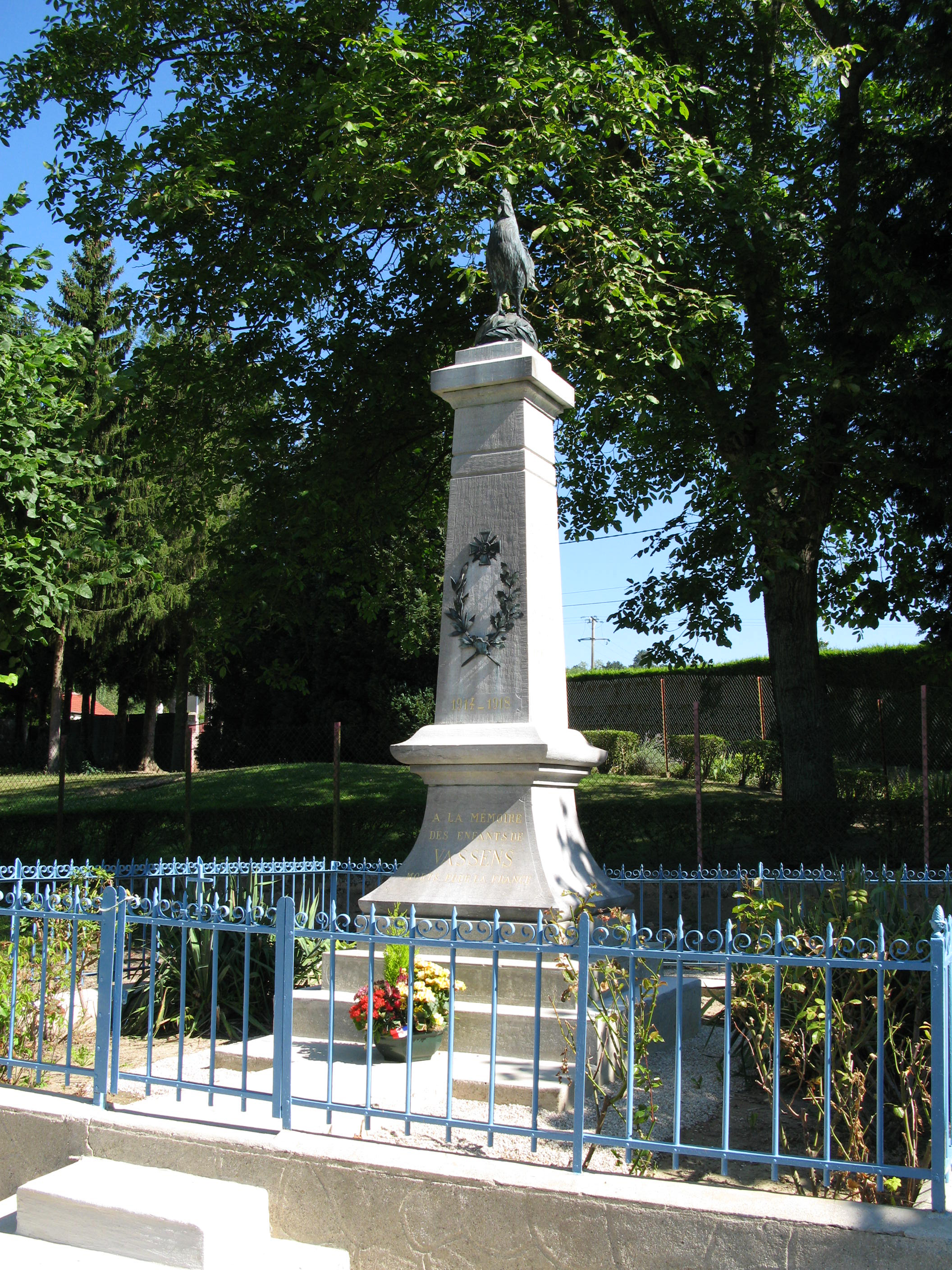
- War memorial
- Location of Vassens
- Location within France Location within Hauts-de-France
- Coordinates: 49°28′07″N 3°09′16″E
- Country: France
- Region: Hauts-de-France
- Department: Aisne
- Arrondissement: Soissons
- Canton: Vic-sur-Aisne

Government
  - Mayor (2026–32): Stéphane Coville
- Area^{1}: 9.87 km^{2} (3.81 sq mi)
- Elevation: 80 m (260 ft)
- Highest elevation: 156 m (512 ft)
- Lowest elevation: 59 m (194 ft)
- Population (2023): 172
  - Density: 17.4/km^{2} (45.1/sq mi)
- Time zone: UTC+01:00 (CET)
  - Summer (DST): UTC+02:00 (CEST)
- INSEE/Postal code: 02762 /02290
- ^{1} French Land Register data, which excludes lakes, ponds, glaciers > 1 km^{2} (0.386 sq mi or 247 acres) and river estuaries.

Vassens (French pronunciation: [vasɑ̃]) is a commune in the Aisne department in Hauts-de-France in northern France near the town of Laon.

== Geography ==
The commune with the districts of Le Mesnil, Vézin and Le Pont is located at the Ru de Vassens stream and on the border with the Département of Oise between Noyon and Soissons. Neighboring communes are Blérancourt and Saint-Aubin in the north, Selens in the north-east, Morsain in the east, Autrêches (which is located in the Département Oise) in the south Audignicourt in the west.

== Places of interest ==
- The church
- The war memorial crowned by a Gallic rooster (Monument aux morts).

== Population ==
Historical population
Year	Pop.	±% p.a.
1968	138	—
1975	110	−3.19%
1982	91	−2.67%
1990	105	+1.80%
1999	126	+2.05%
2007	165	+3.43%
2012	174	+1.07%
2017	151	−2.80%
2023	172	+2.19%
Source: INSEE

== See also ==
- Communes of the Aisne department
