= Audignicourt =

- Commune
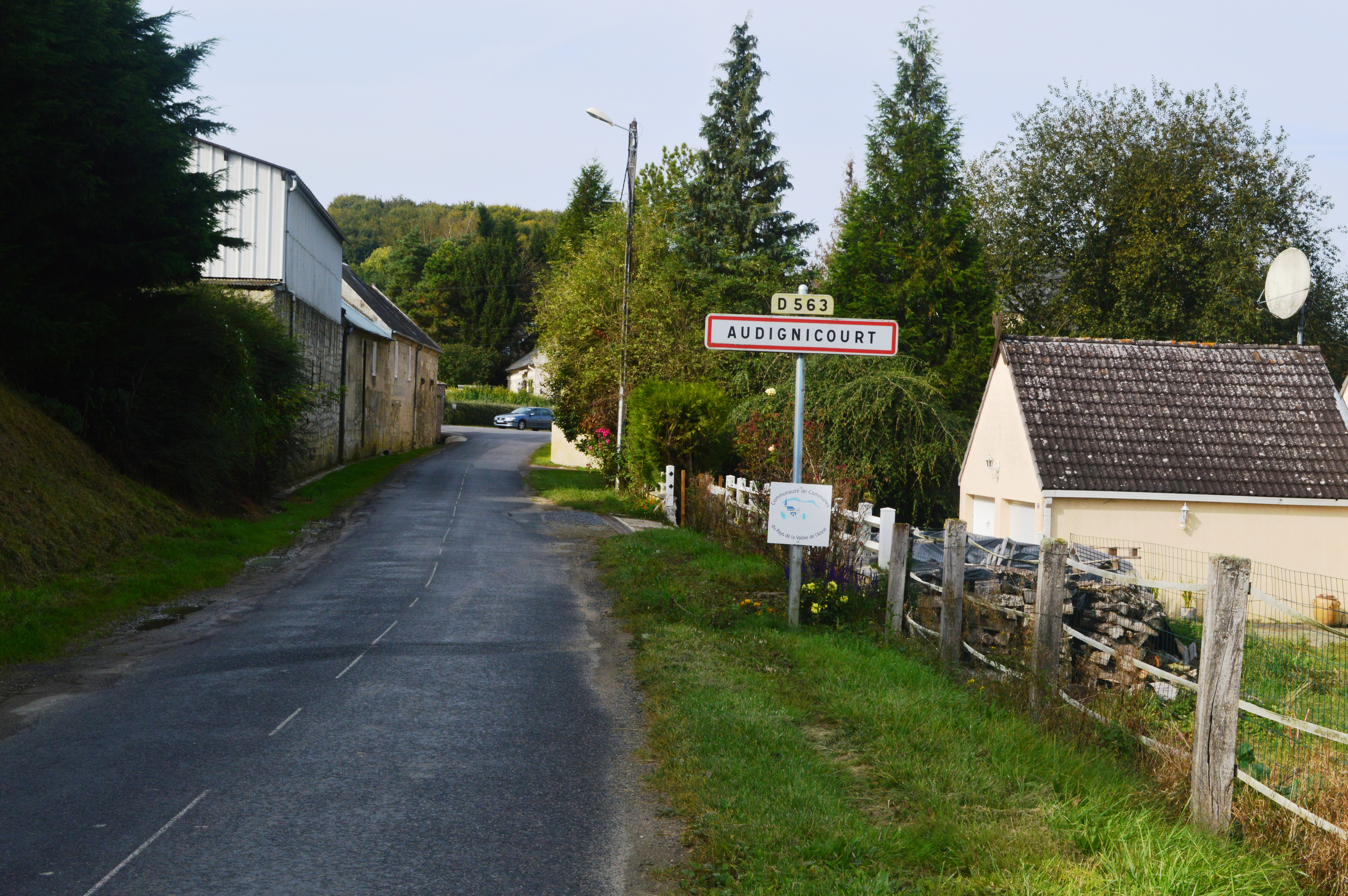

- Coat of arms
- Location of Audignicourt
- Location within France Location within Hauts-de-France
- Coordinates: 49°28′45″N 3°08′02″E
- Country: France
- Region: Hauts-de-France
- Department: Aisne
- Arrondissement: Soissons
- Canton: Vic-sur-Aisne
- Intercommunality: Retz-en-Valois

Government
  - Mayor (2026–32): Christophe Théron
- Area^{1}: 5.66 km^{2} (2.19 sq mi)
- Elevation: 79 m (259 ft)
- Highest elevation: 154 m (505 ft)
- Lowest elevation: 72 m (236 ft)
- Population (2023): 104
  - Density: 18.4/km^{2} (47.6/sq mi)
- Time zone: UTC+01:00 (CET)
  - Summer (DST): UTC+02:00 (CEST)
- INSEE/Postal code: 02034 /02300
- ^{1} French Land Register data, which excludes lakes, ponds, glaciers > 1 km^{2} (0.386 sq mi or 247 acres) and river estuaries.

Audignicourt (French pronunciation: [odiɲikuʁ]) is a commune in the department of Aisne in the Hauts-de-France region of northern France.

== Geography ==
Audignicourt is located some 20 km southeast of Noyon and 20 km northwest of Soissons. It can be accessed on the D563L road from Nampcel in the west and continuing east to Vassens. The D650 road also serves the commune and village branching off the D935 in the north. The southern and western borders of the commune are also the border between the departments of Aisne and Oise.

The commune is traversed by the Ru de Moulins stream from west to east and the commune is quite extensively forested around an extended area surrounding the stream. The rest of the commune is farmland with no other hamlets or villages.

== Administration ==
List of Successive Mayors of Audignicourt

From	To	Name	Party
2001	2008	Jeanne Mouton	DVD
2008	2020	Philippe Moyon	DVD
2020	Current	Christophe Théron	

== Population ==
Historical population
Year	Pop.	±% p.a.
1968	135	—
1975	87	−6.08%
1982	77	−1.73%
1990	94	+2.52%
1999	98	+0.46%
2007	101	+0.38%
2012	104	+0.59%
2017	118	+2.56%
2023	104	−2.08%
Source: INSEE

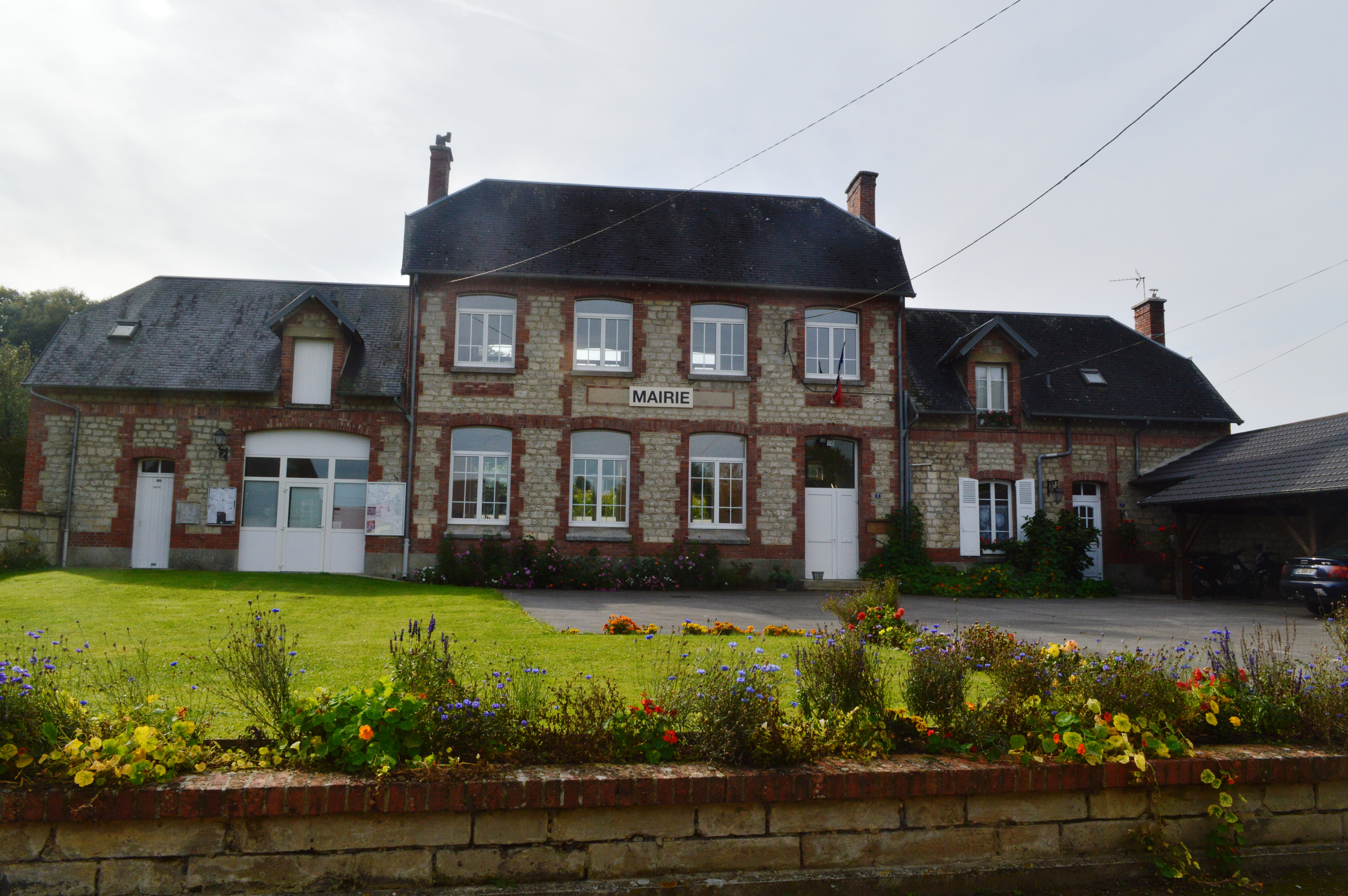
The Town Hall

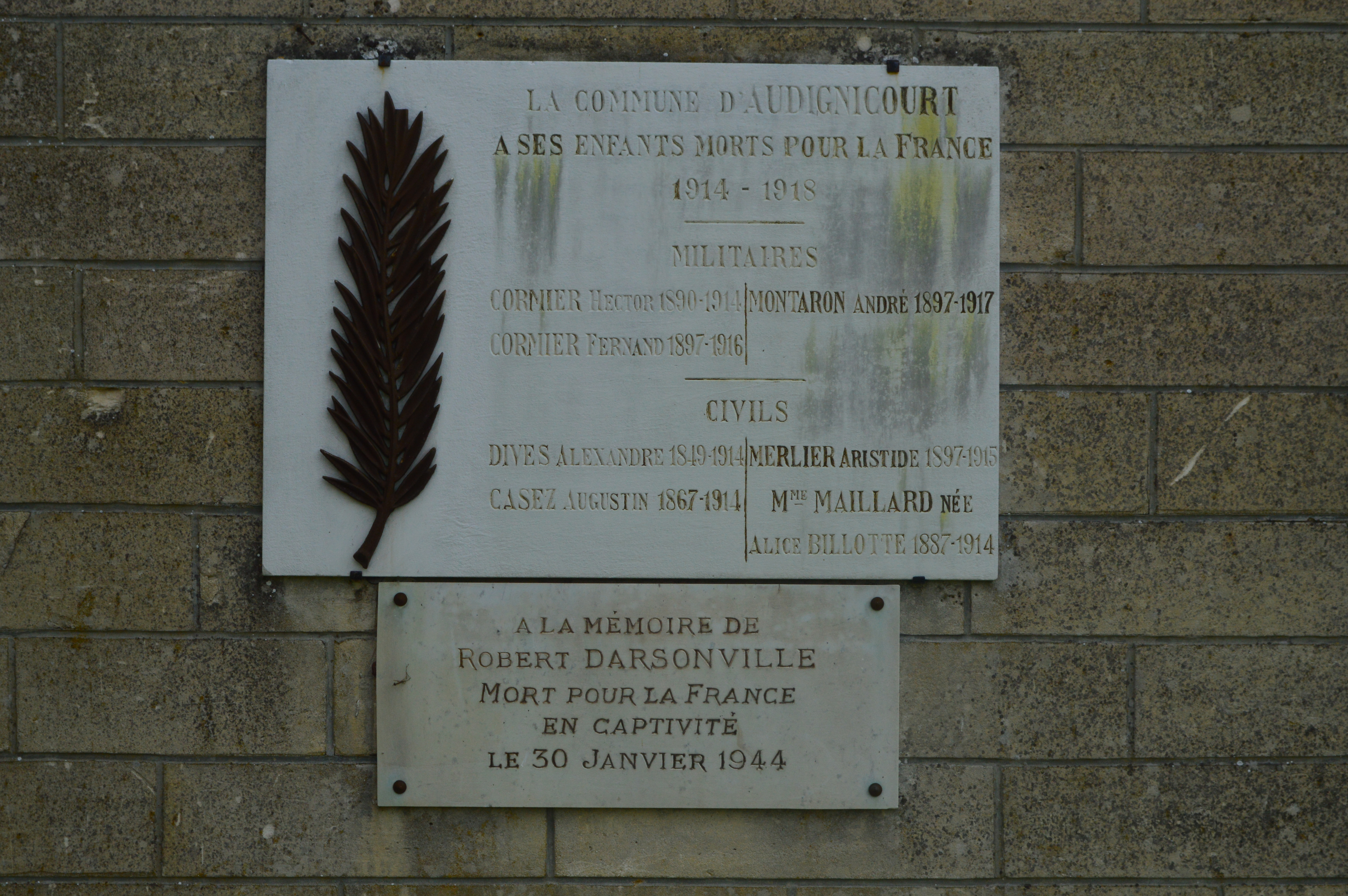
Audignicourt War Memorial

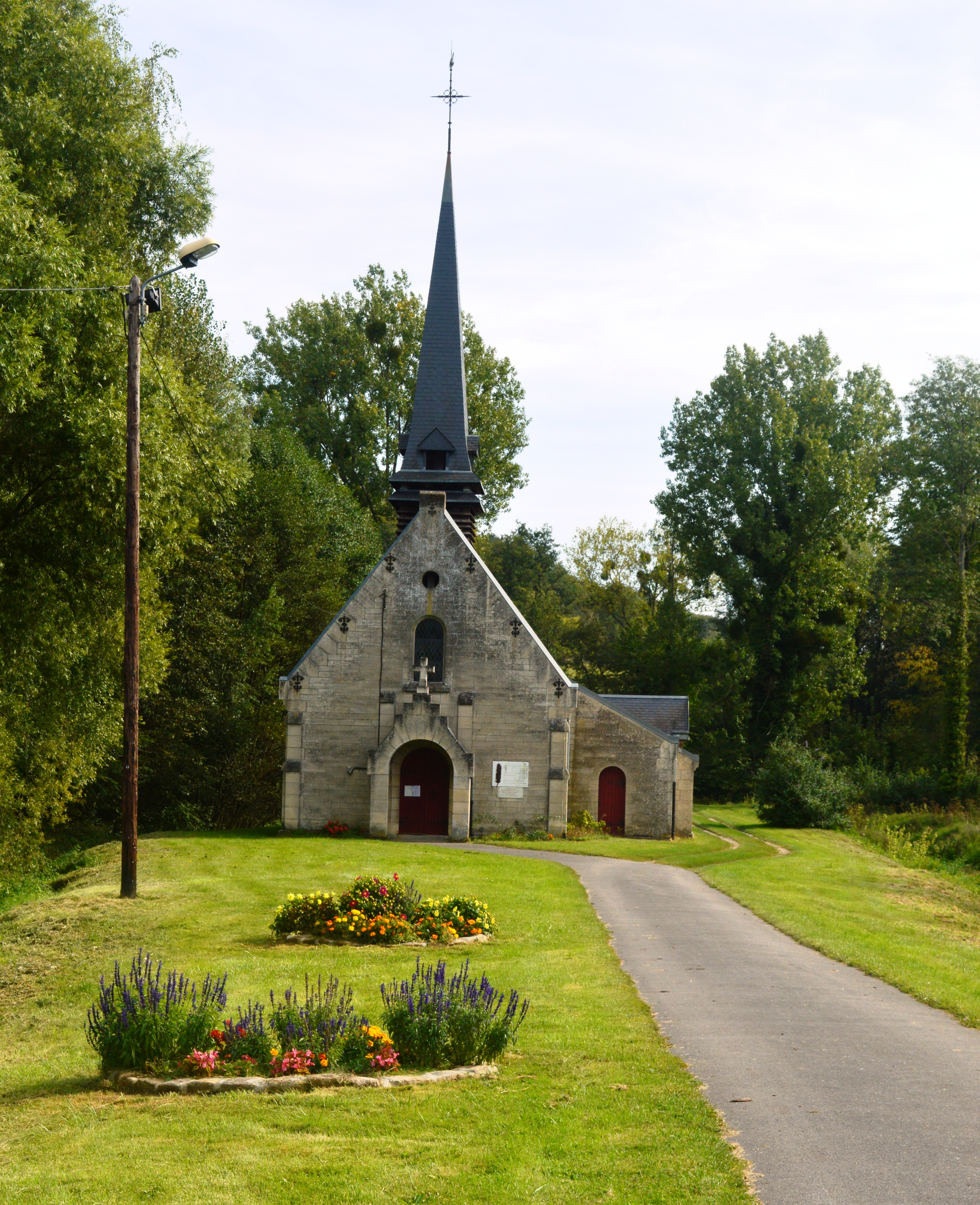
Audignicourt Church

== See also ==
- Communes of the Aisne department
