= Tracy-le-Mont =

Tracy le Mont
- Commune
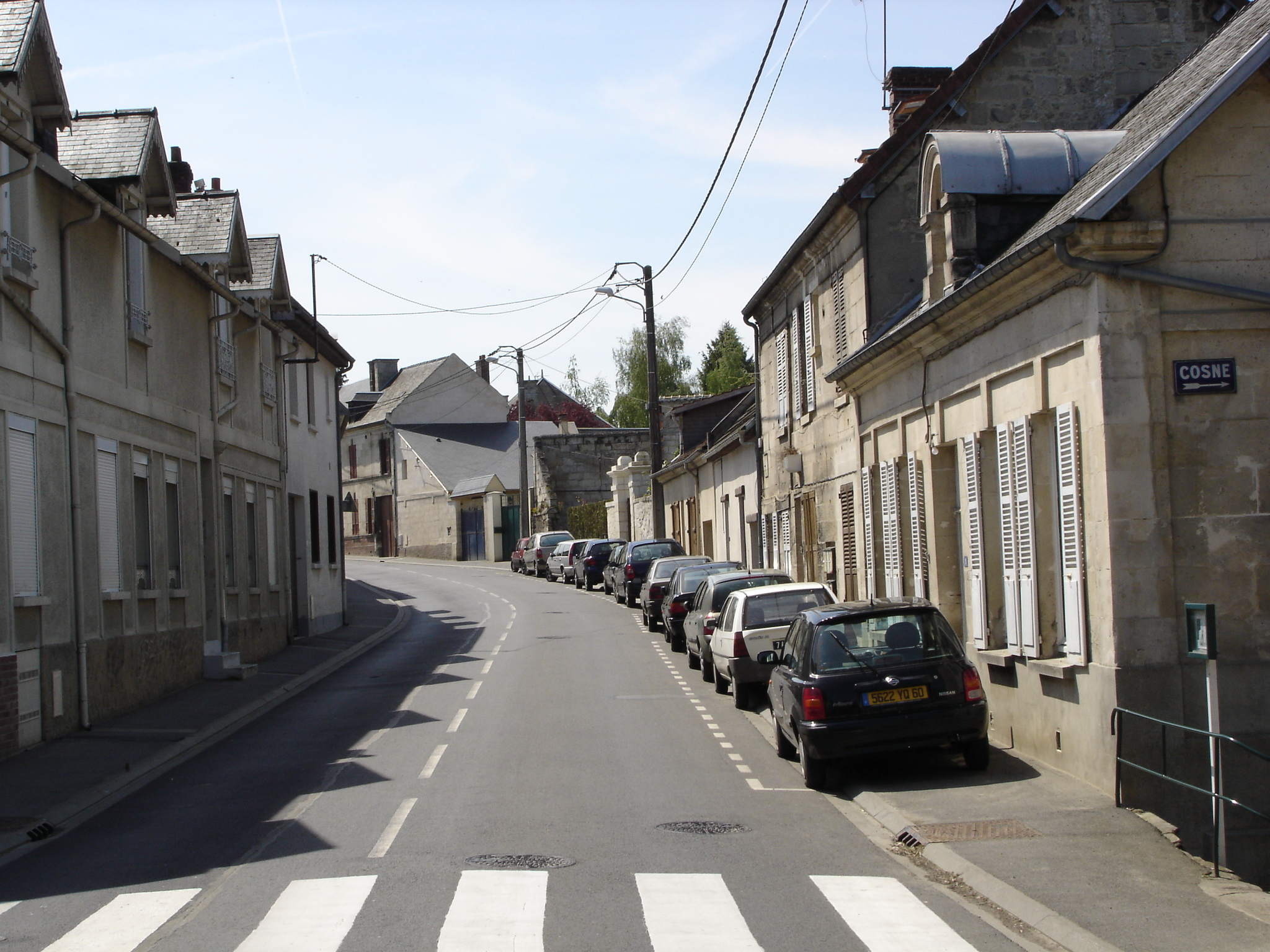
- A view within Tracy-le-Mont
- Location of Tracy le Mont
- Location within France Location within Hauts-de-France
- Coordinates: 49°28′17″N 3°00′34″E
- Country: France
- Region: Hauts-de-France
- Department: Oise
- Arrondissement: Compiègne
- Canton: Compiègne-1

Government
  - Mayor (2023–2026): Jean Gourdon
- Area^{1}: 18.57 km^{2} (7.17 sq mi)
- Elevation: 120 m (390 ft)
- Highest elevation: 149 m (489 ft)
- Lowest elevation: 39 m (128 ft)
- Population (2023): 1,686
  - Density: 90.79/km^{2} (235.1/sq mi)
- Time zone: UTC+01:00 (CET)
  - Summer (DST): UTC+02:00 (CEST)
- INSEE/Postal code: 60641 /60170
- ^{1} French Land Register data, which excludes lakes, ponds, glaciers > 1 km^{2} (0.386 sq mi or 247 acres) and river estuaries.

Tracy-le-Mont (French pronunciation: [tʁasi lə mɔ̃]) is a commune in the Oise department in northern France.

== See also ==
- Communes of the Oise department
