= Margny-lès-Compiègne =

- Commune
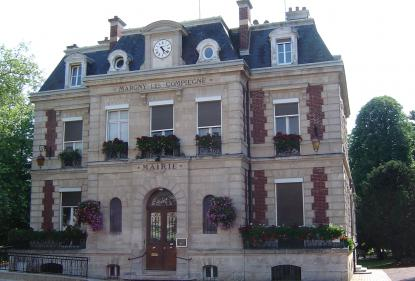
- Town hall
- Location of Margny-lès-Compiègne
- Location within France Location within Hauts-de-France
- Coordinates: 49°25′37″N 2°49′18″E
- Country: France
- Region: Hauts-de-France
- Department: Oise
- Arrondissement: Compiègne
- Canton: Compiègne-1
- Intercommunality: CA Région de Compiègne et Basse Automne

Government
  - Mayor (2020–2026): Bernard Hellal
- Area^{1}: 6.66 km^{2} (2.57 sq mi)
- Elevation: 35 m (115 ft)
- Highest elevation: 102 m (335 ft)
- Lowest elevation: 31 m (102 ft)
- Population (2023): 8,677
  - Density: 1,300/km^{2} (3,370/sq mi)
- Time zone: UTC+01:00 (CET)
  - Summer (DST): UTC+02:00 (CEST)
- INSEE/Postal code: 60382 /60280
- ^{1} French Land Register data, which excludes lakes, ponds, glaciers > 1 km^{2} (0.386 sq mi or 247 acres) and river estuaries.

Margny-lès-Compiègne (French pronunciation: [maʁɲi lɛ kɔ̃pjɛɲ], literally Margny near Compiègne) is a commune in the Oise department in northern France.

== Climate ==
On average, Margny-lès-Compiègne experiences 44.3 days per year with a minimum temperature below 0 °C (32.0 °F), 0.6 days per year with a minimum temperature below −10 °C (14.0 °F), 5.4 days per year with a maximum temperature below 0 °C (32.0 °F), and 8.7 days per year with a maximum temperature above 30 °C (86.0 °F). The record high temperature was 41.5 °C (106.7 °F) on July 25, 2019, while the record low temperature was −15.0 °C (5.0 °F) on January 7, 2009.

Climate data for Margny-lès-Compiègne (1991–2020 normals, extremes 1994–present)
Month	Jan	Feb	Mar	Apr	May	Jun	Jul	Aug	Sep	Oct	Nov	Dec	Year
Record high °C (°F)	14.8 (58.6)	19.1 (66.4)	25.1 (77.2)	27.5 (81.5)	31.9 (89.4)	35.6 (96.1)	41.5 (106.7)	39.2 (102.6)	34.8 (94.6)	28.2 (82.8)	20.2 (68.4)	16.4 (61.5)	41.5 (106.7)
Mean daily maximum °C (°F)	6.4 (43.5)	7.9 (46.2)	11.6 (52.9)	15.5 (59.9)	18.8 (65.8)	22.2 (72.0)	24.7 (76.5)	24.6 (76.3)	20.7 (69.3)	15.9 (60.6)	10.3 (50.5)	6.9 (44.4)	15.5 (59.8)
Daily mean °C (°F)	3.9 (39.0)	4.8 (40.6)	7.5 (45.5)	10.5 (50.9)	13.8 (56.8)	16.9 (62.4)	19.0 (66.2)	18.9 (66.0)	15.6 (60.1)	12.0 (53.6)	7.5 (45.5)	4.5 (40.1)	11.2 (52.2)
Mean daily minimum °C (°F)	1.5 (34.7)	1.8 (35.2)	3.4 (38.1)	5.4 (41.7)	8.8 (47.8)	11.5 (52.7)	13.3 (55.9)	13.3 (55.9)	10.5 (50.9)	8.2 (46.8)	4.7 (40.5)	2.2 (36.0)	7.1 (44.7)
Record low °C (°F)	−15.0 (5.0)	−10.3 (13.5)	−10.4 (13.3)	−4.8 (23.4)	−0.6 (30.9)	3.1 (37.6)	.49 (32.88)	.49 (32.88)	0.5 (32.9)	−4.6 (23.7)	−10.4 (13.3)	−11.3 (11.7)	−15.0 (5.0)
Average precipitation mm (inches)	50.9 (2.00)	44.9 (1.77)	42.7 (1.68)	42.1 (1.66)	57.7 (2.27)	54.4 (2.14)	56.6 (2.23)	62.9 (2.48)	43.9 (1.73)	60.2 (2.37)	52.6 (2.07)	64.6 (2.54)	633.5 (24.94)
Average precipitation days (≥ 1.0 mm)	10.8	9.6	9.3	8.4	9.4	8.7	8.0	8.9	7.7	9.5	10.4	12.4	113.1
Source: Meteociel

== Population ==
Historical population
Year	Pop.	±% p.a.
1968	5,601	—
1975	5,370	−0.60%
1982	5,429	+0.16%
1990	5,625	+0.44%
1999	6,507	+1.63%
2007	7,735	+2.18%
2012	7,997	+0.67%
2017	8,370	+0.92%
2023	8,677	+0.60%
Source: INSEE

== See also ==
- Communes of the Oise department
