= Saint-Crépin-aux-Bois =

- Commune
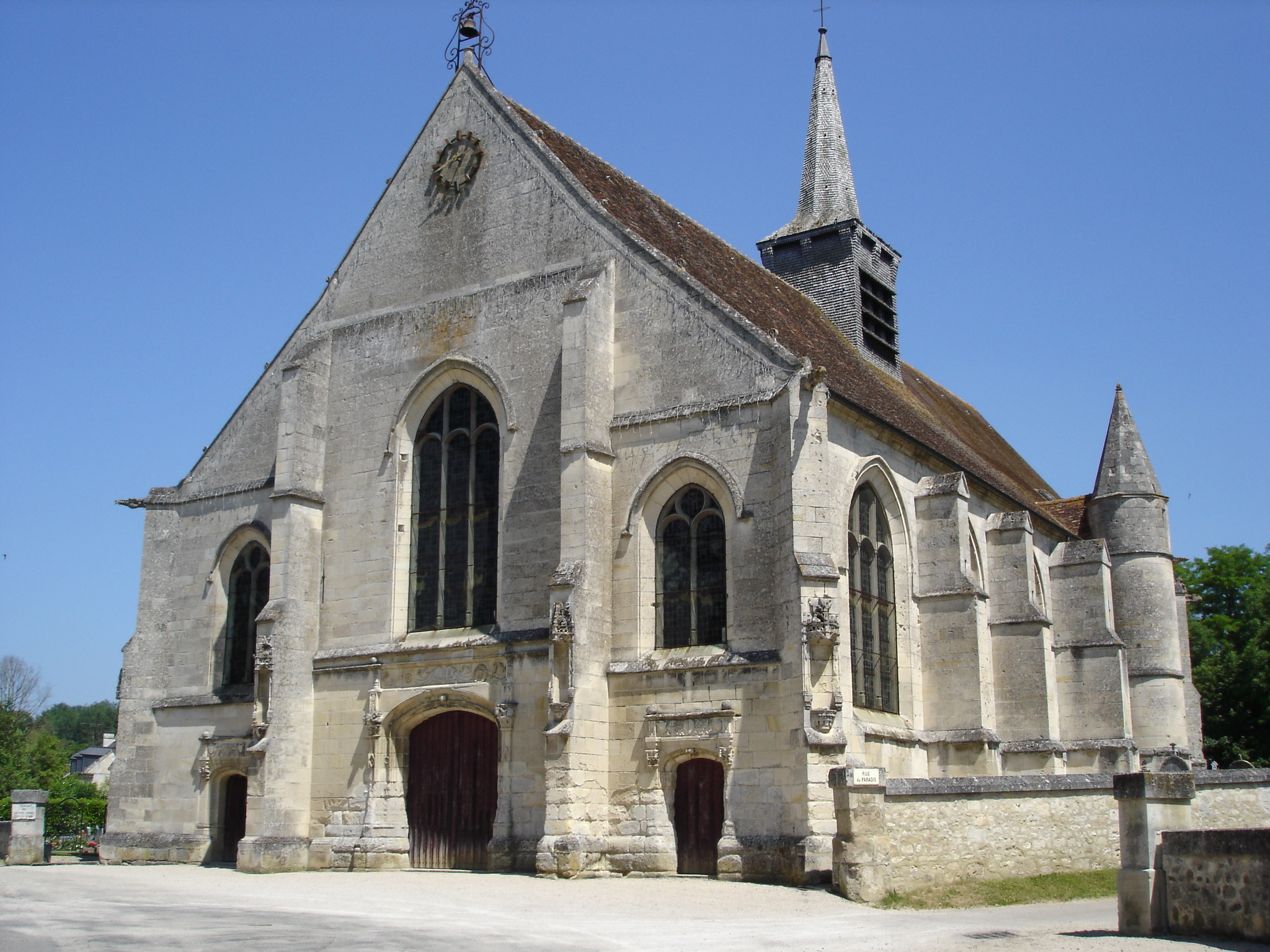
- The church in Saint-Crépin-aux-Bois
- Location of Saint-Crépin-aux-Bois
- Location within France Location within Hauts-de-France
- Coordinates: 49°26′05″N 2°58′48″E
- Country: France
- Region: Hauts-de-France
- Department: Oise
- Arrondissement: Compiègne
- Canton: Compiègne-1

Government
  - Mayor (2020–2026): Laurent Bargada
- Area^{1}: 16.3 km^{2} (6.3 sq mi)
- Elevation: 130 m (430 ft)
- Highest elevation: 142 m (466 ft)
- Lowest elevation: 45 m (148 ft)
- Population (2023): 189
  - Density: 11.6/km^{2} (30.0/sq mi)
- Time zone: UTC+01:00 (CET)
  - Summer (DST): UTC+02:00 (CEST)
- INSEE/Postal code: 60569 /60170
- ^{1} French Land Register data, which excludes lakes, ponds, glaciers > 1 km^{2} (0.386 sq mi or 247 acres) and river estuaries.

Saint-Crépin-aux-Bois (French pronunciation: [sɛ̃ kʁepɛ̃ o bwa]) is a commune in the Oise department in northern France.

== Population ==
Historical population
Year	Pop.	±% p.a.
1968	211	—
1975	222	+0.73%
1982	233	+0.69%
1990	231	−0.11%
1999	260	+1.32%
2007	252	−0.39%
2012	247	−0.40%
2017	215	−2.74%
2023	189	−2.13%
Source: INSEE

== See also ==
- Communes of the Oise department
