= Bienville, Oise =

Bienville
- Commune
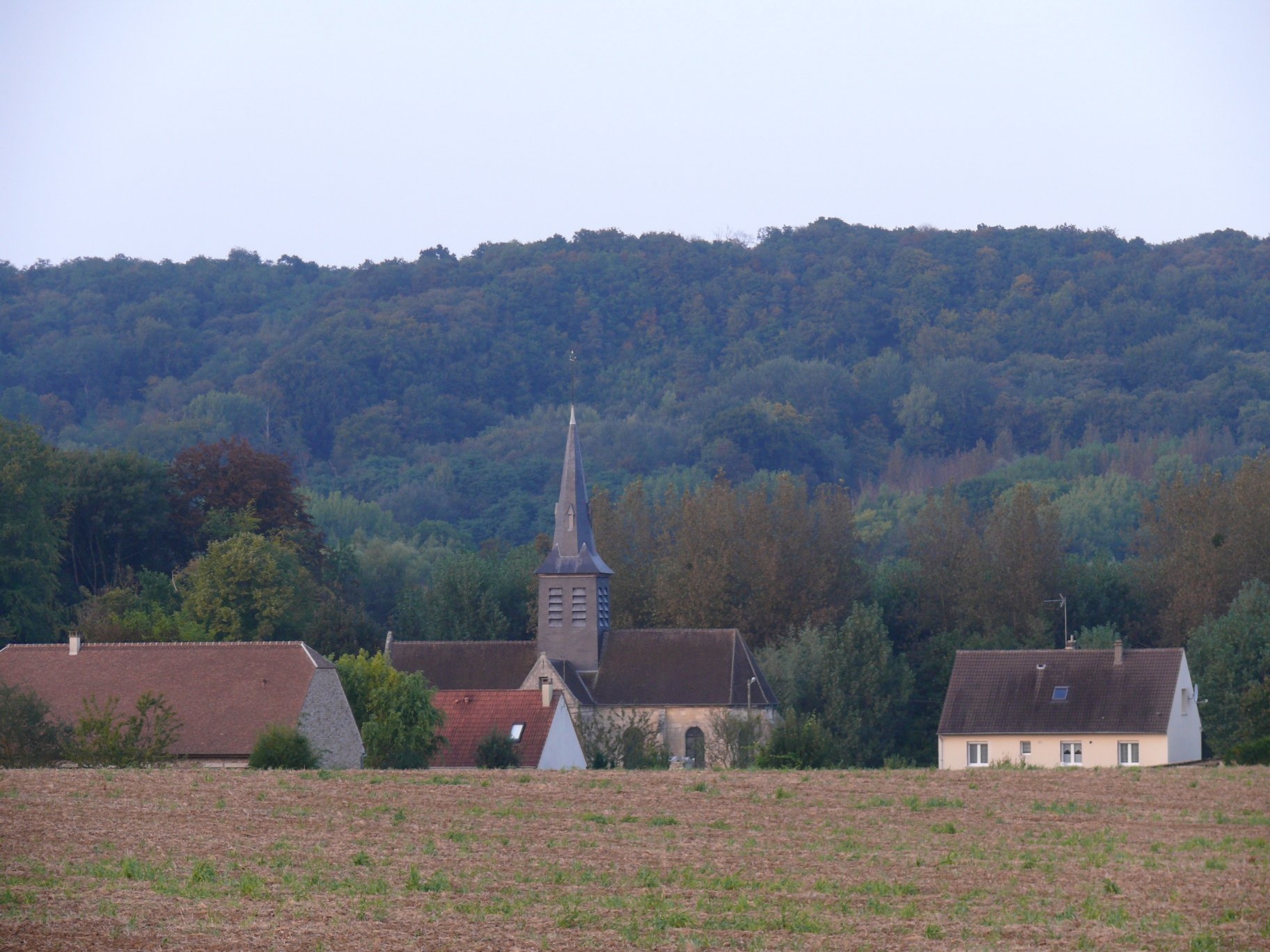
- The church in Bienville
- Location of Bienville
- Location within France Location within Hauts-de-France
- Coordinates: 49°26′59″N 2°49′49″E
- Country: France
- Region: Hauts-de-France
- Department: Oise
- Arrondissement: Compiègne
- Canton: Compiègne-1
- Intercommunality: CA Région de Compiègne et Basse Automne

Government
  - Mayor (2023–2026): Patrick Leroux
- Area^{1}: 3.51 km^{2} (1.36 sq mi)
- Elevation: 43 m (141 ft)
- Highest elevation: 139 m (456 ft)
- Lowest elevation: 37 m (121 ft)
- Population (2023): 495
  - Density: 141/km^{2} (365/sq mi)
- Time zone: UTC+01:00 (CET)
  - Summer (DST): UTC+02:00 (CEST)
- INSEE/Postal code: 60070 /60280
- ^{1} French Land Register data, which excludes lakes, ponds, glaciers > 1 km^{2} (0.386 sq mi or 247 acres) and river estuaries.

Bienville (French pronunciation: [bjɛ̃vil]) is a commune in the Oise department in northern France

== Population ==
Historical population
Year	Pop.	±% p.a.
1968	440	—
1975	503	+1.93%
1982	411	−2.84%
1990	514	+2.83%
1999	480	−0.76%
2007	466	−0.37%
2012	459	−0.30%
2017	442	−0.75%
2023	495	+1.91%
Source: INSEE

== See also ==
- Communes of the Oise department
