= Canton of Compiègne-1 =

Canton of France

Coordinates: 49.42°N 2.83°E

- Canton
- Situation of the canton of Compiègne-1 in the department of Oise
- Country: France
- Region: Hauts-de-France
- Department: Oise
- No. of communes: {{{nbcomm}}}
- Population (2023): 41,669
- INSEE code: 6006

The canton of Compiègne-1 is an administrative division of the Oise department, northern France. It was created at the French canton reorganisation which came into effect in March 2015. Its seat is in Compiègne.

It consists of the following communes:

1. Attichy
2. Autrêches
3. Berneuil-sur-Aisne
4. Bienville
5. Bitry
6. Choisy-au-Bac
7. Clairoix
8. Compiègne (partly)
9. Couloisy
10. Courtieux
11. Janville
12. Jaulzy
13. Margny-lès-Compiègne
14. Moulin-sous-Touvent
15. Nampcel
16. Rethondes
17. Saint-Crépin-aux-Bois
18. Saint-Pierre-lès-Bitry
19. Tracy-le-Mont
20. Trosly-Breuil
