= Moulin-sous-Touvent =

- Commune
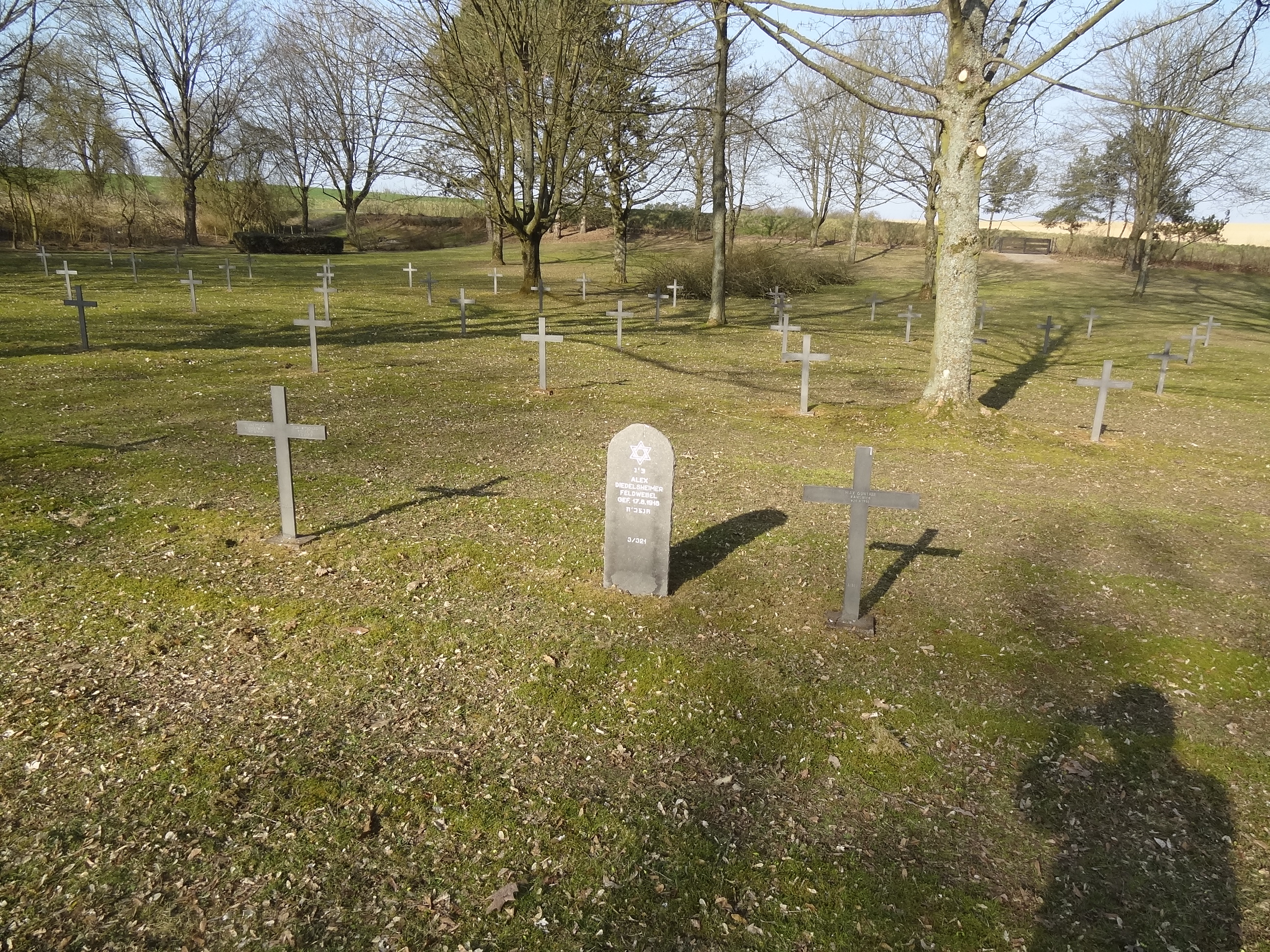
- The German military cemetery in Moulin-sous-Touvent
- Location of Moulin-sous-Touvent
- Location within France Location within Hauts-de-France
- Coordinates: 49°27′25″N 3°04′19″E
- Country: France
- Region: Hauts-de-France
- Department: Oise
- Arrondissement: Compiègne
- Canton: Compiègne-1

Government
  - Mayor (2020–2026): Anne Brocvielle
- Area^{1}: 18.14 km^{2} (7.00 sq mi)
- Elevation: 93 m (305 ft)
- Highest elevation: 158 m (518 ft)
- Lowest elevation: 68 m (223 ft)
- Population (2023): 185
  - Density: 10.2/km^{2} (26.4/sq mi)
- Time zone: UTC+01:00 (CET)
  - Summer (DST): UTC+02:00 (CEST)
- INSEE/Postal code: 60438 /60350
- ^{1} French Land Register data, which excludes lakes, ponds, glaciers > 1 km^{2} (0.386 sq mi or 247 acres) and river estuaries.

Moulin-sous-Touvent (French pronunciation: [mulɛ̃ su tuvɑ̃]) is a commune in the Oise department in northern France.

== History ==
=== First World War ===
Lying on the front lines of the Western Front, the commune was occupied by Germany and liberated by the Allies. .

The stone quarries of Moulin-sous-Touvent, exploited since the Middle Ages, were occupied in 1914 by the German forces, who took over the dormitories and expanded the underground network, creating hundreds of meters of new galleries.

== See also ==
- Communes of the Oise department
