= Saint-Pierre-lès-Bitry =

- Commune
- Location of Saint-Pierre-lès-Bitry
- Location within France Location within Hauts-de-France
- Coordinates: 49°25′30″N 3°04′33″E
- Country: France
- Region: Hauts-de-France
- Department: Oise
- Arrondissement: Compiègne
- Canton: Compiègne-1

Government
  - Mayor (2020–2026): Michaël Lemmens
- Area^{1}: 3.42 km^{2} (1.32 sq mi)
- Elevation: 100 m (330 ft)
- Highest elevation: 151 m (495 ft)
- Lowest elevation: 55 m (180 ft)
- Population (2023): 153
  - Density: 44.7/km^{2} (116/sq mi)
- Time zone: UTC+01:00 (CET)
  - Summer (DST): UTC+02:00 (CEST)
- INSEE/Postal code: 60593 /60350
- ^{1} French Land Register data, which excludes lakes, ponds, glaciers > 1 km^{2} (0.386 sq mi or 247 acres) and river estuaries.

Saint-Pierre-lès-Bitry (French pronunciation: [sɛ̃ pjɛʁ lɛ bitʁi], literally Saint-Pierre near Bitry) is a commune in the Oise department in northern France.

== See also ==
- Communes of the Oise department
