= Jaulzy =

- Commune
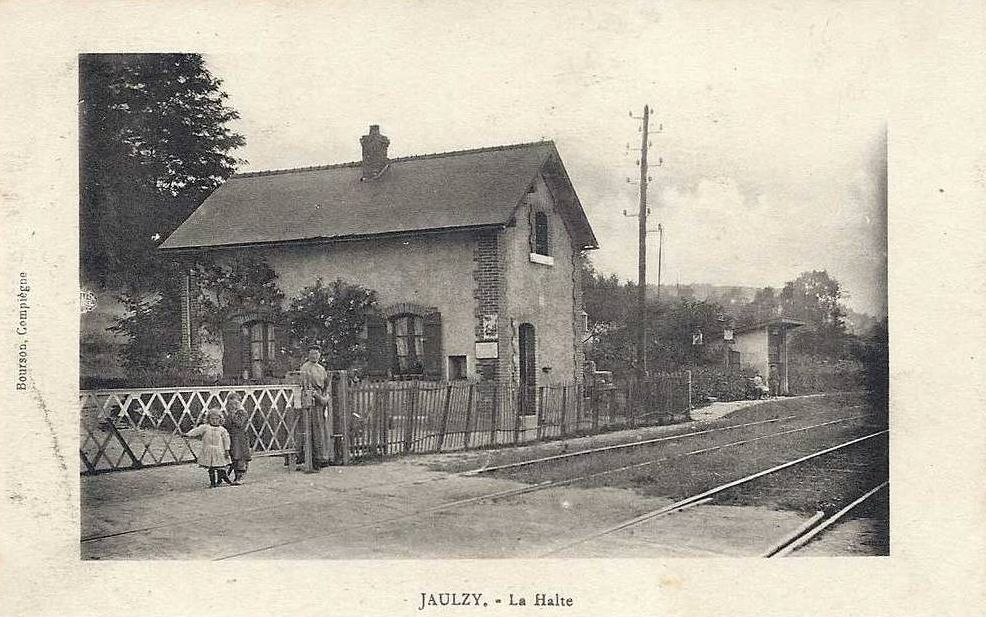
- The old railway halt in Jaulzy
- Location of Jaulzy
- Location within France Location within Hauts-de-France
- Coordinates: 49°23′44″N 3°03′48″E
- Country: France
- Region: Hauts-de-France
- Department: Oise
- Arrondissement: Compiègne
- Canton: Compiègne-1

Government
  - Mayor (2020–2026): Yves Loubes
- Area^{1}: 7.26 km^{2} (2.80 sq mi)
- Elevation: 48 m (157 ft)
- Highest elevation: 152 m (499 ft)
- Lowest elevation: 36 m (118 ft)
- Population (2023): 851
  - Density: 117/km^{2} (304/sq mi)
- Time zone: UTC+01:00 (CET)
  - Summer (DST): UTC+02:00 (CEST)
- INSEE/Postal code: 60324 /60350
- ^{1} French Land Register data, which excludes lakes, ponds, glaciers > 1 km^{2} (0.386 sq mi or 247 acres) and river estuaries.

Jaulzy (French pronunciation: [ʒolzi]) is a commune in the Oise department in northern France.

== See also ==
- Communes of the Oise department
