= Clairoix =

- Commune
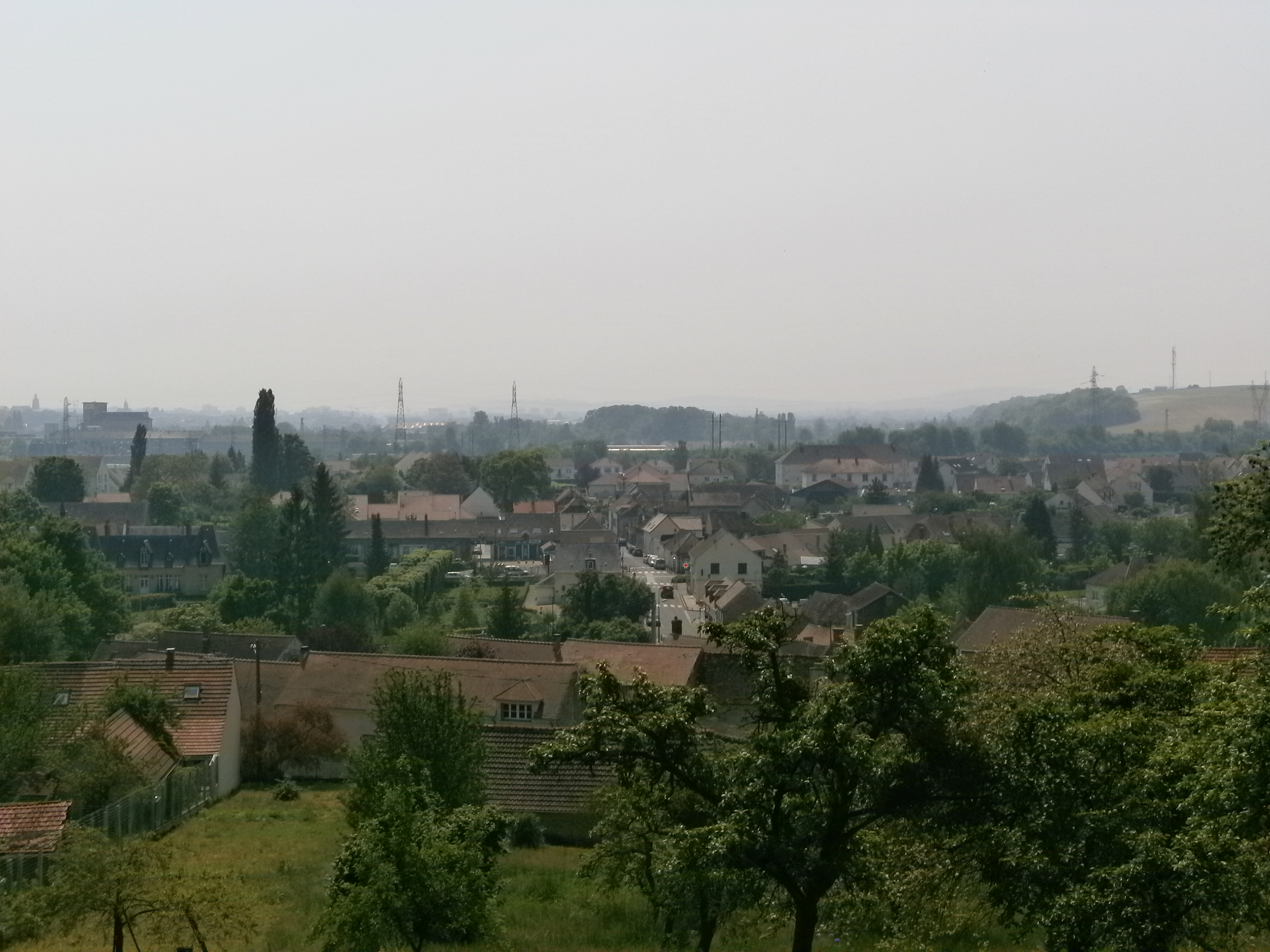
- A general view of Clairoix

- Coat of arms
- Location of Clairoix
- Location within France Location within Hauts-de-France
- Coordinates: 49°26′35″N 2°50′52″E
- Country: France
- Region: Hauts-de-France
- Department: Oise
- Arrondissement: Compiègne
- Canton: Compiègne-1
- Intercommunality: CA Région de Compiègne et Basse Automne

Government
  - Mayor (2020–2026): Laurent Portebois
- Area^{1}: 4.7 km^{2} (1.8 sq mi)
- Highest elevation: 141 m (463 ft)
- Lowest elevation: 31 m (102 ft)
- Population (2023): 2,208
  - Density: 470/km^{2} (1,200/sq mi)
- Time zone: UTC+01:00 (CET)
  - Summer (DST): UTC+02:00 (CEST)
- INSEE/Postal code: 60156 /60280
- ^{1} French Land Register data, which excludes lakes, ponds, glaciers > 1 km^{2} (0.386 sq mi or 247 acres) and river estuaries.

Clairoix (French pronunciation: [klɛʁwa]) is a commune in the Oise department in northern France.

== Population ==
Historical population
| Year | Pop. | ±% p.a. |
|---|---|---|
| 1968 | 1,714 | — |
| 1975 | 1,798 | +0.69% |
| 1982 | 1,580 | −1.83% |
| 1990 | 1,614 | +0.27% |
| 1999 | 1,952 | +2.14% |
| 2007 | 1,985 | +0.21% |
| 2012 | 2,113 | +1.26% |
| 2017 | 2,165 | +0.49% |
| 2023 | 2,208 | +0.33% |
Source: INSEE

== See also ==
- Communes of the Oise department
