= Couloisy =

- Commune
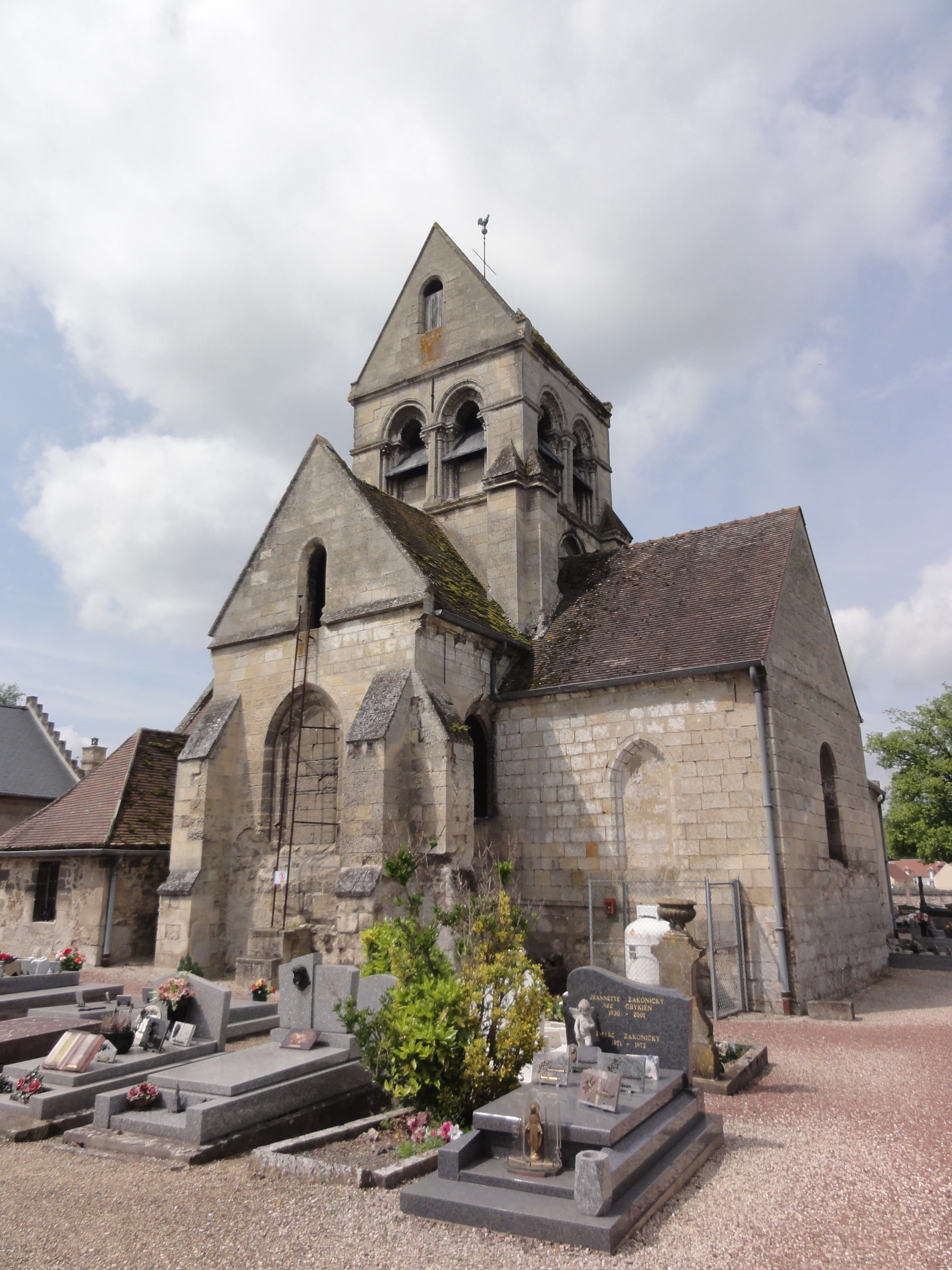
- The church in Couloisy
- Location of Couloisy
- Location within France Location within Hauts-de-France
- Coordinates: 49°23′59″N 3°01′41″E
- Country: France
- Region: Hauts-de-France
- Department: Oise
- Arrondissement: Compiègne
- Canton: Compiègne-1
- Intercommunality: Lisières de l'Oise

Government
  - Mayor (2020–2026): Jean-Claude Cormont
- Area^{1}: 3.74 km^{2} (1.44 sq mi)
- Elevation: 41 m (135 ft)
- Highest elevation: 127 m (417 ft)
- Lowest elevation: 37 m (121 ft)
- Population (2023): 592
  - Density: 158/km^{2} (410/sq mi)
- Time zone: UTC+01:00 (CET)
  - Summer (DST): UTC+02:00 (CEST)
- INSEE/Postal code: 60167 /60350
- ^{1} French Land Register data, which excludes lakes, ponds, glaciers > 1 km^{2} (0.386 sq mi or 247 acres) and river estuaries.

Couloisy (French pronunciation: [kulwazi]) is a commune in the Oise department in northern France.

== See also ==
- Communes of the Oise department
