= Nampcel =

- Commune
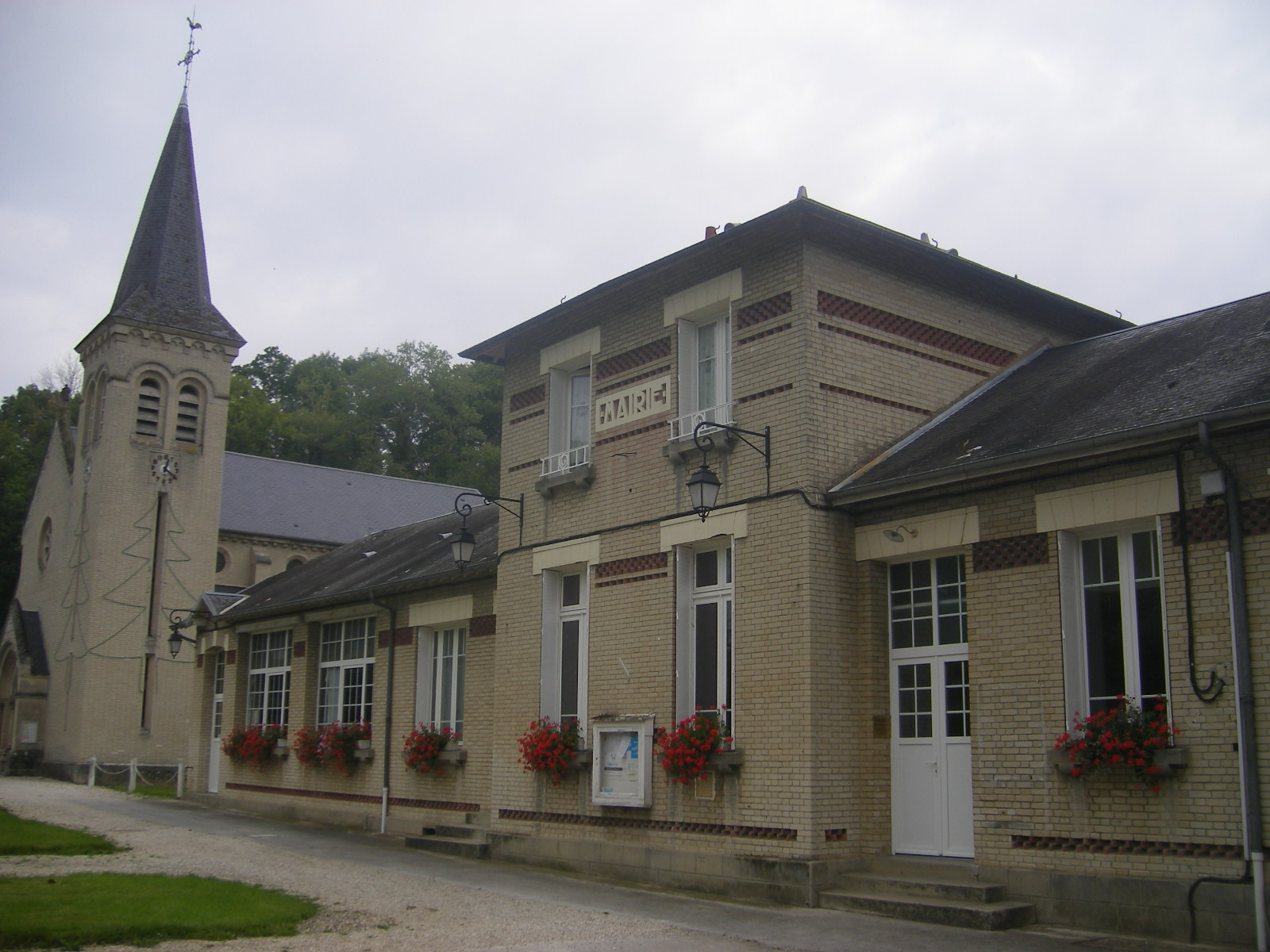
- The town hall in Nampcel
- Location of Nampcel
- Location within France Location within Hauts-de-France
- Coordinates: 49°29′11″N 3°05′59″E
- Country: France
- Region: Hauts-de-France
- Department: Oise
- Arrondissement: Compiègne
- Canton: Compiègne-1

Government
  - Mayor (2020–2026): Anne-Marie Defrance
- Area^{1}: 16.69 km^{2} (6.44 sq mi)
- Elevation: 97 m (318 ft)
- Highest elevation: 166 m (545 ft)
- Lowest elevation: 73 m (240 ft)
- Population (2023): 293
  - Density: 17.6/km^{2} (45.5/sq mi)
- Time zone: UTC+01:00 (CET)
  - Summer (DST): UTC+02:00 (CEST)
- INSEE/Postal code: 60445 /60400
- ^{1} French Land Register data, which excludes lakes, ponds, glaciers > 1 km^{2} (0.386 sq mi or 247 acres) and river estuaries.

Nampcel (French pronunciation: [nɑ̃sɛl]) is a commune in the Oise department in northern France.

== See also ==
- Communes of the Oise department
