= Autrêches =

- Commune
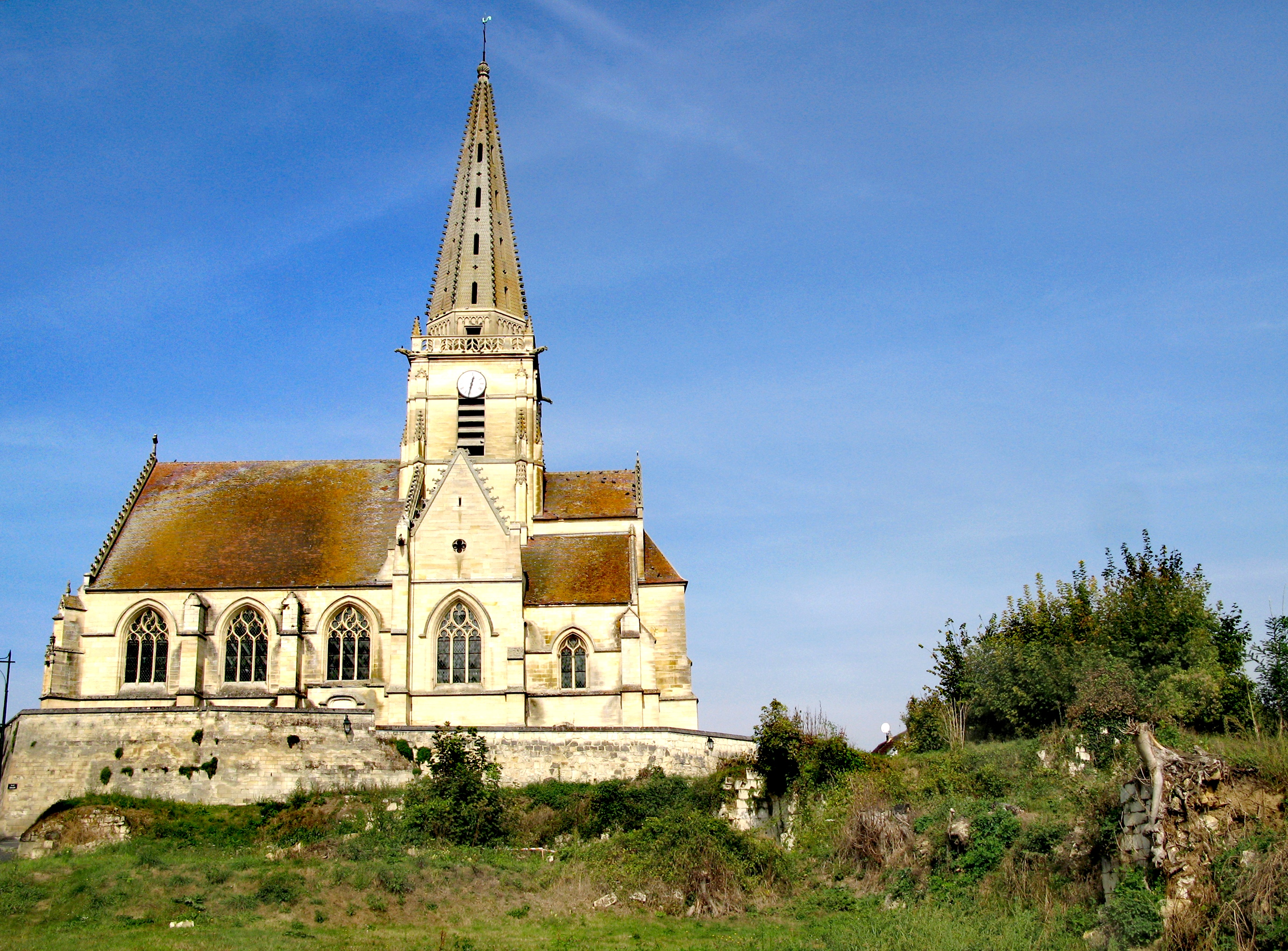
- The church in Autrêches
- Location of Autrêches
- Location within France Location within Hauts-de-France
- Coordinates: 49°26′43″N 3°07′30″E
- Country: France
- Region: Hauts-de-France
- Department: Oise
- Arrondissement: Compiègne
- Canton: Compiègne-1
- Intercommunality: CC Lisières Oise

Government
  - Mayor (2020–2026): Michel Potier
- Area^{1}: 13.03 km^{2} (5.03 sq mi)
- Elevation: 151 m (495 ft)
- Highest elevation: 152 m (499 ft)
- Lowest elevation: 46 m (151 ft)
- Population (2023): 738
  - Density: 56.6/km^{2} (147/sq mi)
- Time zone: UTC+01:00 (CET)
  - Summer (DST): UTC+02:00 (CEST)
- INSEE/Postal code: 60032 /60350
- ^{1} French Land Register data, which excludes lakes, ponds, glaciers > 1 km^{2} (0.386 sq mi or 247 acres) and river estuaries.

Autrêches (French pronunciation: [otʁɛʃ]) is a commune in the Oise department in northern France.

== Population ==
Historical population
Year	Pop.	±% p.a.
1968	524	—
1975	537	+0.35%
1982	537	+0.00%
1990	574	+0.84%
1999	671	+1.75%
2007	737	+1.18%
2012	750	+0.35%
2017	733	−0.46%
2023	738	+0.11%
Source: INSEE

== See also ==
- Communes of the Oise department
- https://autrecheshautebrayechevillecourt.wordpress.com/
