= Vandy, Ardennes =

Vandy
- Commune
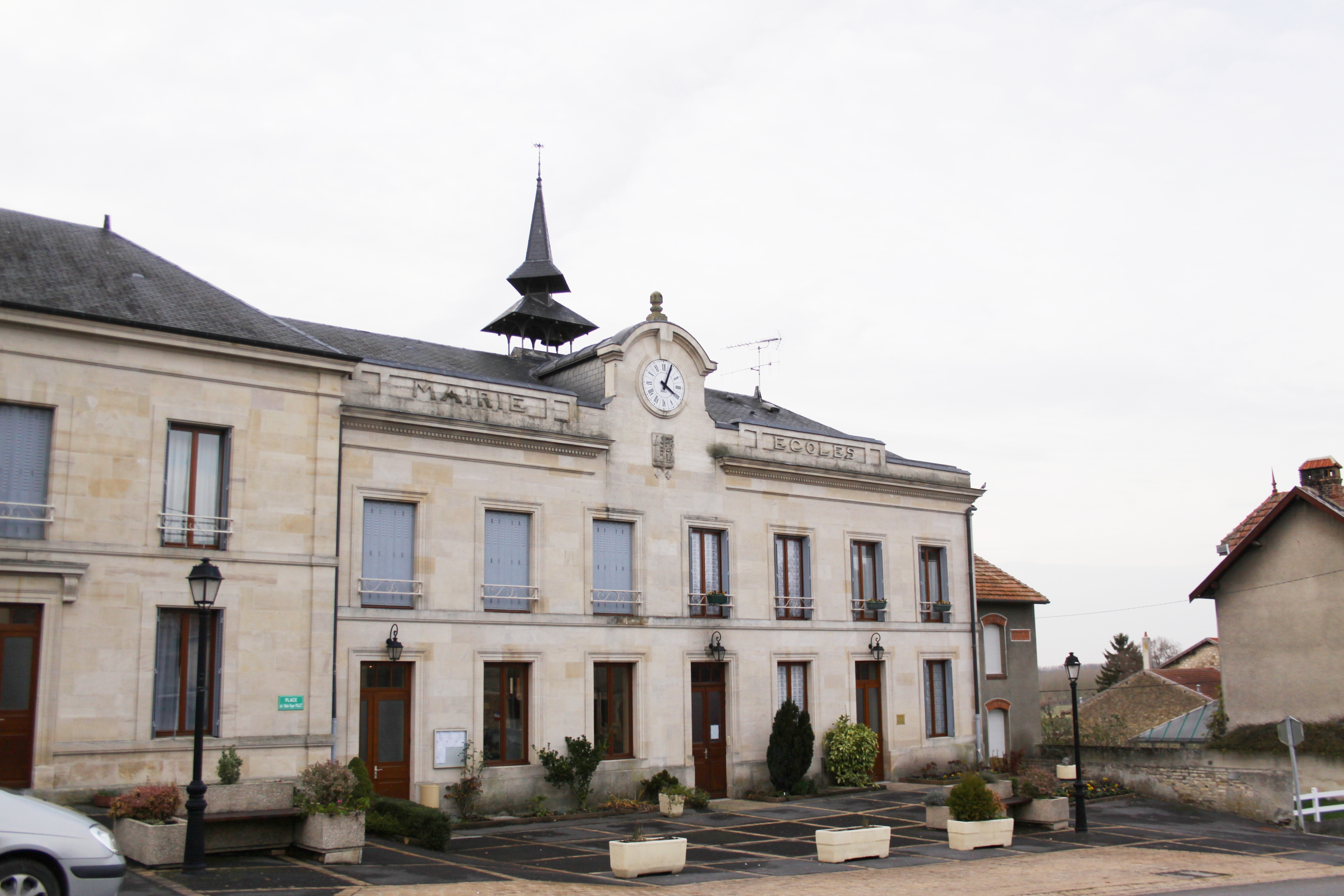
- Town hall

- Coat of arms
- Location of Vandy
- Location within France Location within Grand Est
- Coordinates: 49°26′07″N 4°42′23″E
- Country: France
- Region: Grand Est
- Department: Ardennes
- Arrondissement: Vouziers
- Canton: Vouziers
- Intercommunality: Argonne Ardennaise

Government
  - Mayor (2020–2026): Bruno Dauphy
- Area^{1}: 11.11 km^{2} (4.29 sq mi)
- Elevation: 103 m (338 ft)
- Population (2023): 204
  - Density: 18.4/km^{2} (47.6/sq mi)
- Time zone: UTC+01:00 (CET)
  - Summer (DST): UTC+02:00 (CEST)
- INSEE/Postal code: 08461 /08400
- ^{1} French Land Register data, which excludes lakes, ponds, glaciers > 1 km^{2} (0.386 sq mi or 247 acres) and river estuaries.

Vandy (French pronunciation: [vɑ̃di]) is a commune in the Ardennes department in northern France.

== Population ==
Historical population
Year	Pop.	±% p.a.
1968	217	—
1975	217	+0.00%
1982	220	+0.20%
1990	218	−0.11%
1999	202	−0.84%
2007	177	−1.64%
2012	180	+0.34%
2017	207	+2.83%
2023	204	−0.24%
Source: INSEE

== See also ==
- Communes of the Ardennes department
