= Berneuil-sur-Aisne =

- Commune
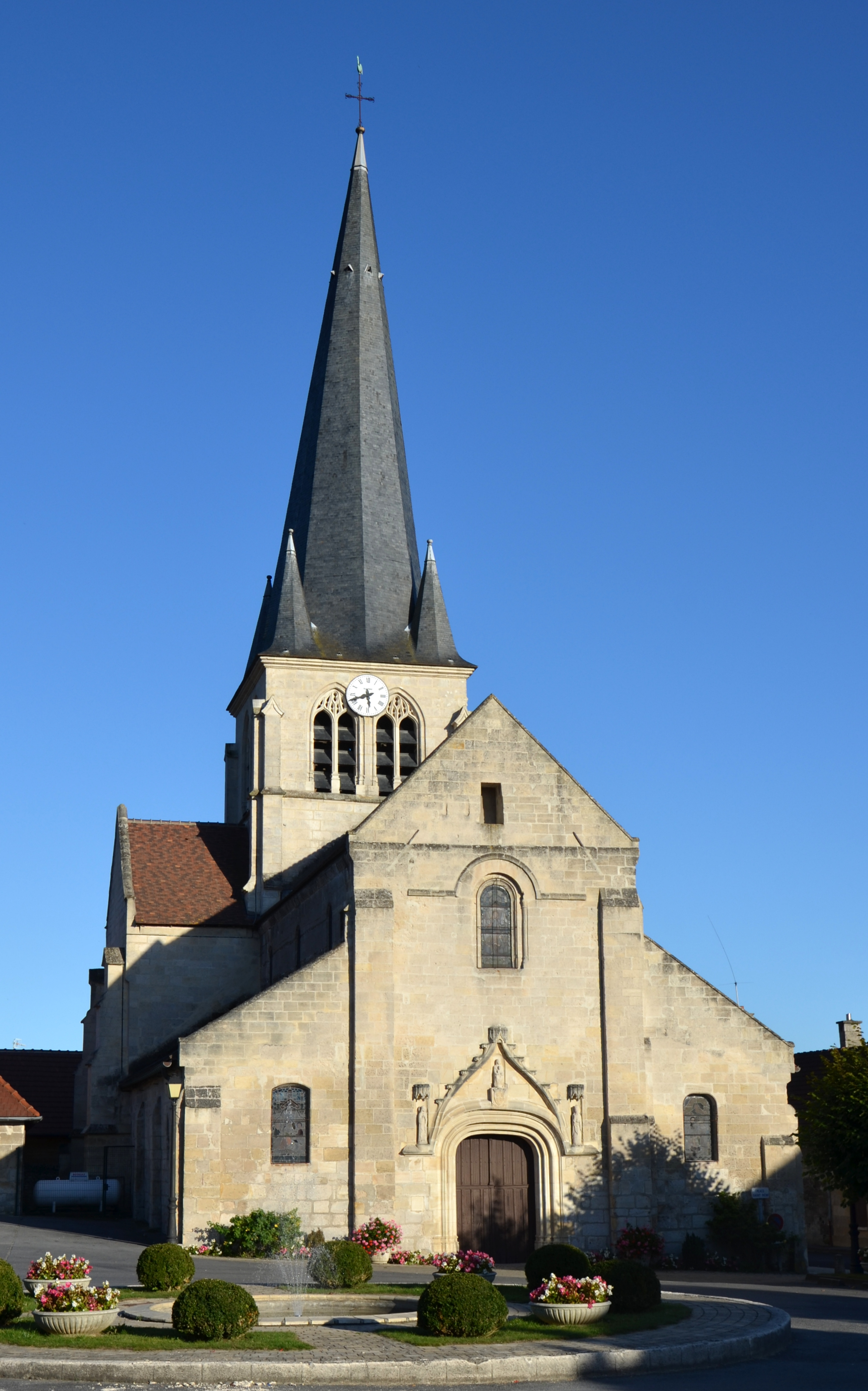
- The church in Berneuil-sur-Aisne

- Coat of arms
- Location of Berneuil-sur-Aisne
- Location within France Location within Hauts-de-France
- Coordinates: 49°24′56″N 3°00′15″E
- Country: France
- Region: Hauts-de-France
- Department: Oise
- Arrondissement: Compiègne
- Canton: Compiègne-1

Government
  - Mayor (2020–2026): Étienne Frère
- Area^{1}: 10.61 km^{2} (4.10 sq mi)
- Elevation: 45 m (148 ft)
- Highest elevation: 142 m (466 ft)
- Lowest elevation: 34 m (112 ft)
- Population (2023): 912
  - Density: 86.0/km^{2} (223/sq mi)
- Time zone: UTC+01:00 (CET)
  - Summer (DST): UTC+02:00 (CEST)
- INSEE/Postal code: 60064 /60350
- ^{1} French Land Register data, which excludes lakes, ponds, glaciers > 1 km^{2} (0.386 sq mi or 247 acres) and river estuaries.

Berneuil-sur-Aisne (French pronunciation: [bɛʁnœj syʁ ɛːn]; literally "Berneuil on Aisne") is a commune in the Oise department in northern France.

== Population ==
Historical population
Year	Pop.	±% p.a.
1968	697	—
1975	700	+0.06%
1982	811	+2.12%
1990	875	+0.95%
1999	922	+0.58%
2007	998	+1.00%
2012	1,013	+0.30%
2017	1,004	−0.18%
2023	912	−1.59%
Source: INSEE

== See also ==
- Communes of the Oise department
