= Choisy-au-Bac =

- Commune
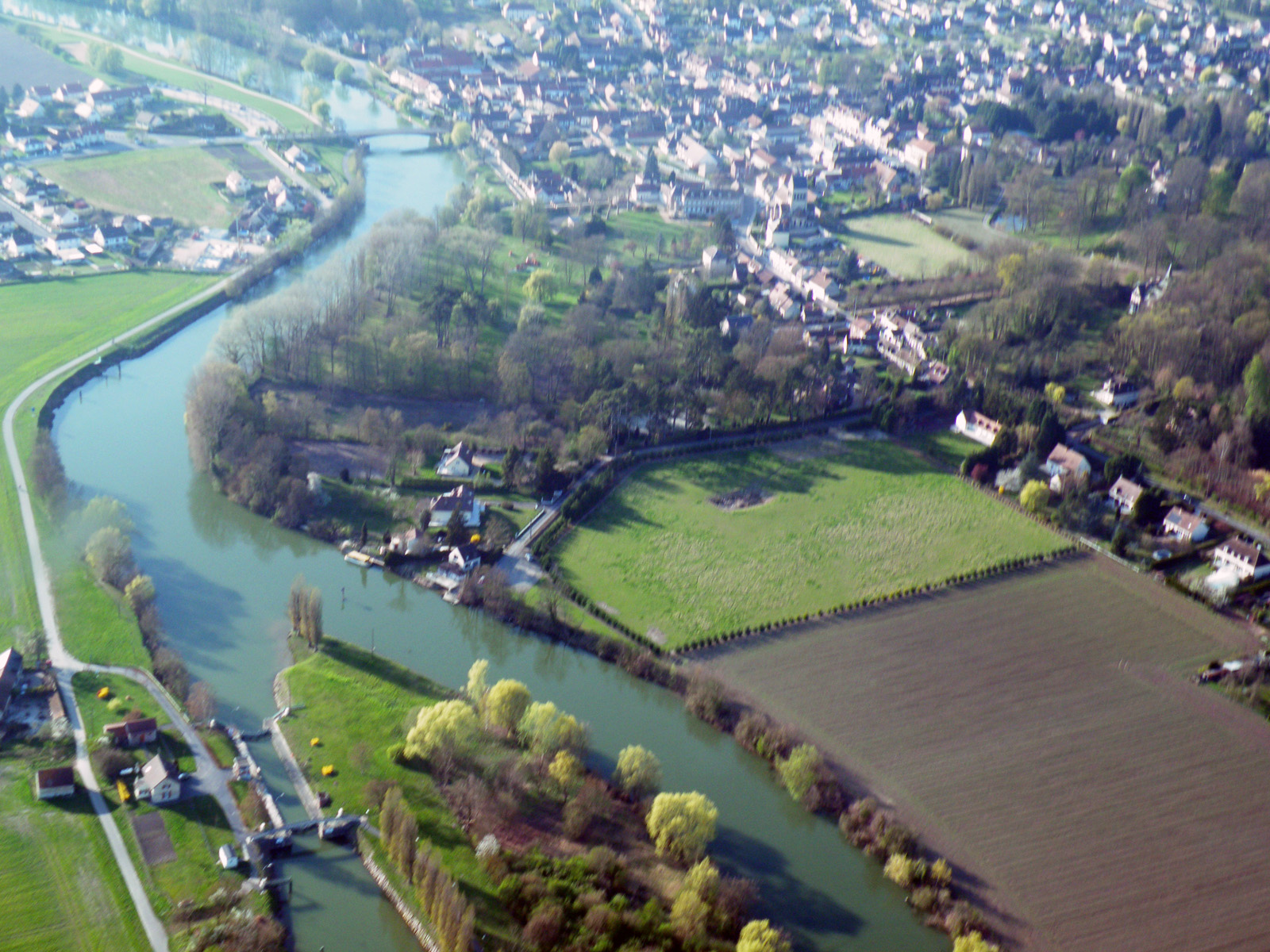
- An aerial view of Choisy-au-Bac and the Aisne river
- Location of Choisy-au-Bac
- Location within France Location within Hauts-de-France
- Coordinates: 49°26′20″N 2°52′42″E
- Country: France
- Region: Hauts-de-France
- Department: Oise
- Arrondissement: Compiègne
- Canton: Compiègne-1
- Intercommunality: CA Région de Compiègne et Basse Automne

Government
  - Mayor (2020–2026): Jean-Luc Mignard
- Area^{1}: 15.86 km^{2} (6.12 sq mi)
- Highest elevation: 112 m (367 ft)
- Lowest elevation: 31 m (102 ft)
- Population (2023): 3,449
  - Density: 217.5/km^{2} (563.2/sq mi)
- Time zone: UTC+01:00 (CET)
  - Summer (DST): UTC+02:00 (CEST)
- INSEE/Postal code: 60151 /60750
- ^{1} French Land Register data, which excludes lakes, ponds, glaciers > 1 km^{2} (0.386 sq mi or 247 acres) and river estuaries.

Choisy-au-Bac (French pronunciation: [ʃwazi o bak]) is a commune in the Oise department in northern France.

== Population ==
Historical population
Year	Pop.	±% p.a.
1968	1,671	—
1975	1,842	+1.40%
1982	2,313	+3.31%
1990	3,786	+6.35%
1999	3,571	−0.65%
2007	3,462	−0.39%
2012	3,364	−0.57%
2017	3,291	−0.44%
2023	3,449	+0.78%
Source: INSEE

== See also ==
- Communes of the Oise department

== External Sources ==
- SOCIÉTÉ HISTORIQUE DE COMPIÈGNE
