= Bitry, Oise =

Bitry
- Commune
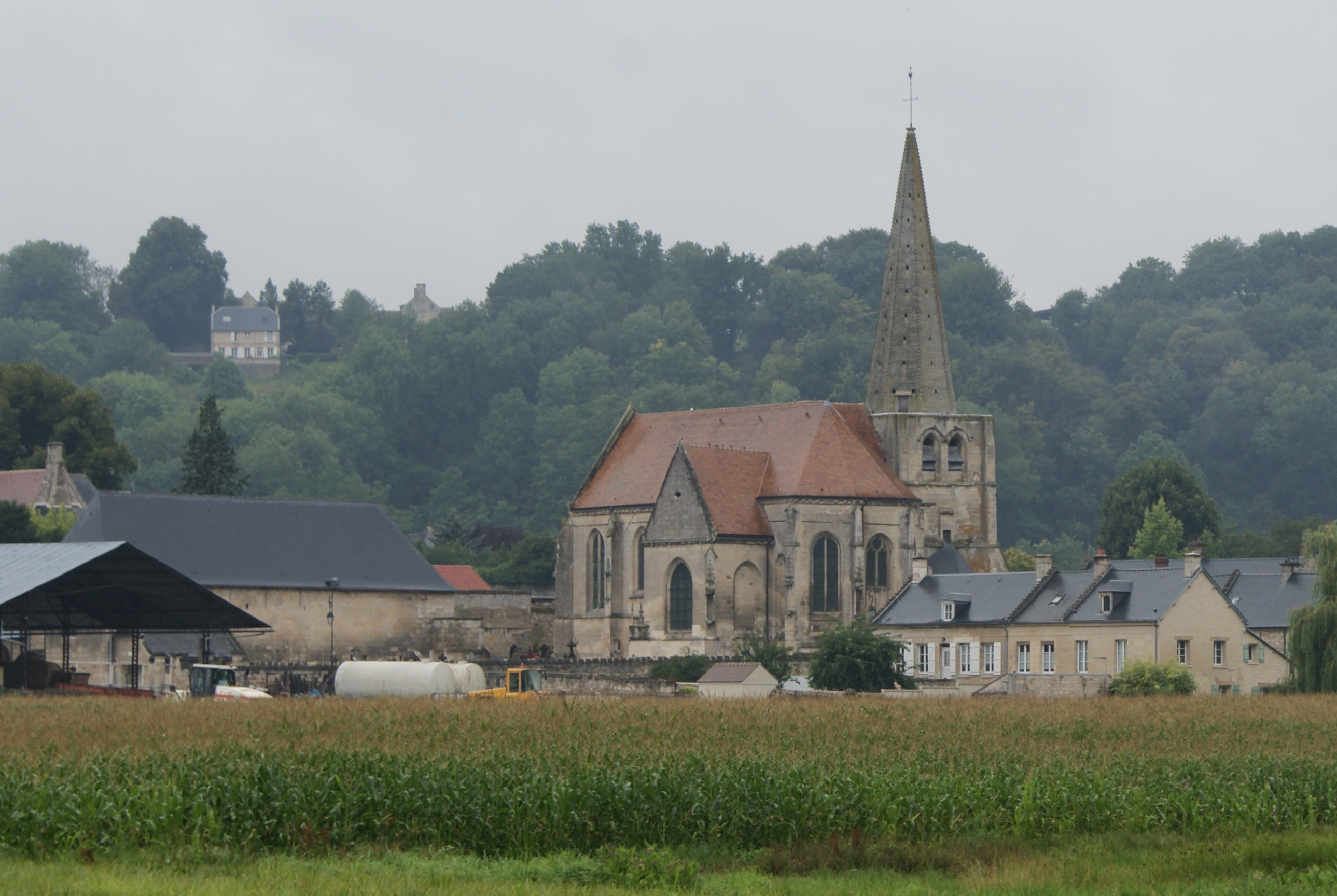
- The church in Bitry

- Coat of arms
- Location of Bitry
- Location within France Location within Hauts-de-France
- Coordinates: 49°24′50″N 3°04′40″E
- Country: France
- Region: Hauts-de-France
- Department: Oise
- Arrondissement: Compiègne
- Canton: Compiègne-1

Government
  - Mayor (2020–2026): Franck Superbi
- Area^{1}: 6.61 km^{2} (2.55 sq mi)
- Elevation: 65 m (213 ft)
- Highest elevation: 144 m (472 ft)
- Lowest elevation: 37 m (121 ft)
- Population (2023): 308
  - Density: 46.6/km^{2} (121/sq mi)
- Time zone: UTC+01:00 (CET)
  - Summer (DST): UTC+02:00 (CEST)
- INSEE/Postal code: 60072 /60350
- ^{1} French Land Register data, which excludes lakes, ponds, glaciers > 1 km^{2} (0.386 sq mi or 247 acres) and river estuaries.

Bitry (French pronunciation: [bitʁi]) is a commune in the Oise department in northern France.

== Population ==
Historical population
Year	Pop.	±% p.a.
1968	297	—
1975	287	−0.49%
1982	266	−1.08%
1990	281	+0.69%
1999	303	+0.84%
2007	303	+0.00%
2012	291	−0.80%
2017	317	+1.73%
2023	308	−0.48%
Source: INSEE

== See also ==
- Communes of the Oise department
