= 1st Foot Cavalry Division =

1st Division de Cavalerie à Pied
- Active: December 1917 – 10 February 1919
- Country: France
- Branch: Army
- Type: Foot cavalry
- Role: Infantry
- Engagements: First World War

The 1st Foot Cavalry Division (French: 1re Division de Cavalerie à Pied) was a French Army formation during World War I.

== Heads of the 1st Foot Cavalry Division ==
- 6 January 1918 – 16 February 1919 (dissolution of the 1st DCP): Général Brécard

== First World War ==
The 1st foot cavalry division was formed on 31 December 1917, in the region of Vic-sur-Aisne, with parts of the 81st D.I..

=== Composition during the War ===
4th Foot Cuirassier Regiment from January to November 1918
9th Foot Cuirassiers Regiment from December 1917 to November 1918
11th Foot Cuirassier Regiment from December 1917 to November 1918
65th Territorial Infantry Regiment from December 1917 to November 1918

=== 1918 ===
10 January – 14 March 1918

Constitution of the region of Vic-sur-Aisne; instruction.

14 – 22 March 1918

Movement to Chamant.

22 March – 3 April 1918

Transport by train to Salency; relieved by the British army.
Engaged in the 2nd Battle of Picardy : defence of the Crozat Canal, fought and retreated to defend parts of the Oise, towards Varesnes and Pontoise.

3 – 30 April 1918

Retreat from the front, movement to Ribécourt-Dreslincourt; work.

30 April – 14 June 1918

Occupation of parts of Thiescourt and Plessis-de-Roye.
9 June, engaged in the Battle of Matz: defence of parts of Matz and the Oise.

14 June – 3 July 1918

Retreat from the front, transport by van to Clermont, in Châlons-sur-Marne, followed by movement to Sainte-Menehould; instruction.

3 July – 10 October 1918

Occupation of the area between Ville-sur-Tourbe and the Aisne, expanded to the right on 15 July, to the woods of Hauzy and Beaurain
21 July, extension of the front, to the left to Massiges.
21 August, reduction to the right, up to the Aisne.
24 September, movement along the road, until 26 September, engaged, between the Aisne and Vienne-le-Château, in the Battle of Somme-Py (Meuse-Argonne Offensive) and exploitation : Servon and Binarville; progression directly to Lançon.

10–16 October 1918

Retreat from the front; moved west to Sainte-Menehould.

16 October – 3 November 1918

Movement to the front; from 18th, occupation of the front of the battle at Termes and the East of Olizy.
Engaged until 1st November in the Battle of Chesne.

3 – 11 November 1918

Retreat from the front, rest in Valmy

=== Attachments ===
Organic attachment: 1st Cavalry Corps from January to November 1918

Third Army

- 15–17 January 1918
- 11 February – 21 March 1918
- 23 – 25 March 1918
- 4 April – 15 June 1918

Fourth Army

- 16 June – 11 November 1918

Sixth Army

- 18 January – 10 February 1918
- 22 March 1918
- 26 March – 3 April 1918 (from 25 March to 2 April 1918, the 1st DCP took part in the Grégoire group of the 1st DI, the 5th CA, and the 35th CA)
