= Matz =

Matz or MATZ may refer to:

== Pseudonyms ==
- Yukihiro Matsumoto, Japanese computer scientist, creator of the programming language Ruby
- Alexis Nolent, French comics writer

== Given name ==
- Matz Robert Eriksson (born 1972), Swedish musician
- Matz Sandman (born 1948), Norwegian politician
- Matz Sels (born 1992), Belgian footballer
- Matz Skoog (1957–2026), Swedish ballet dancer and artistic director

== Surnames ==
- Evelyn Matz (born 1955), German handballer
- Friedrich Matz (1843-1874), German archaeologist
- Howard Matz (born 1943), American judge
- Jeff Matz (born 1977), American bass guitarist
- Johanna Matz (1932–2025), Austrian actress
- Johnny Matz (1892–1969), American ice hockey player
- Klaus-Dieter Matz (born 1932), German handballer
- Mary Jane Phillips-Matz (1926–2013), American biographer
- Michael R. Matz (born 1951), American equestrian
- Peter Matz (1928–2002), American musician, composer, arranger and conductor
- Rudolf Matz (1901–1988), Croatian composer
- Steven Matz (born 1991), American baseball player

== Places ==
- Matz (river), a river in the French department of Oise with the following communes:
- Canny-sur-Matz
- Marest-sur-Matz
- Margny-sur-Matz
- Ressons-sur-Matz
- Roye-sur-Matz

== Other ==
- Me at the zoo, the first video on YouTube
- Military Aerodrome Traffic Zone
