= Ribecourt =

RIbecourt may refer to:

- Cambronne-lès-Ribécourt, a commune in the Oise department in northern France
- Ribécourt-Dreslincourt, a commune in the Oise department in northern France
- Ribécourt-la-Tour, a commune in the Nord department in northern France
