= Margny =

Margny may refer to several communes in France:

- Margny, Ardennes
- Margny, Marne
- Margny-aux-Cerises, in the Oise department
- Margny-lès-Compiègne, in the Oise department
- Margny-sur-Matz, in the Oise department
