= Gury =

Gury may refer to:

== People ==
- Gury Kolosov (1867–1936), Russian and Soviet mathematician and engineer
- Gury Marchuk (1925–2013), Soviet and Russian scientist in the fields of computational mathematics and physics of the atmosphere
- Gury Nikitin (1620–1691), Russian painter
- Gury of Metz, also known as Goeric of Metz, French bishop and saint
- Jean-Pierre Gury (1801–1866), French Jesuit moral theologian

== Places ==
- Gury, Oise, commune in the Oise department in northern France
