= Montmacq =

- Commune
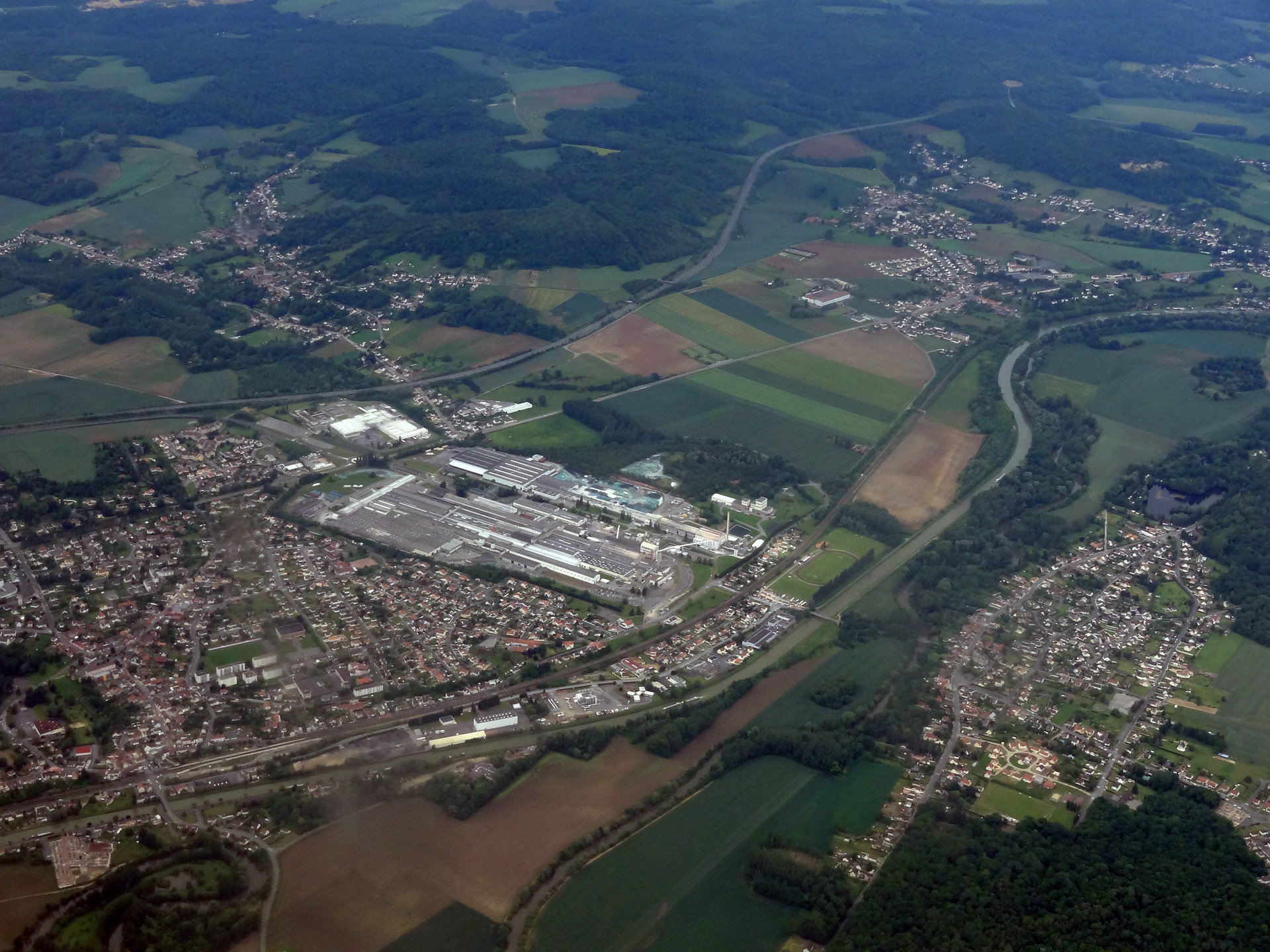
- An aerial view of Montmacq
- Location of Montmacq
- Location within France Location within Hauts-de-France
- Coordinates: 49°28′54″N 2°54′09″E
- Country: France
- Region: Hauts-de-France
- Department: Oise
- Arrondissement: Compiègne
- Canton: Thourotte
- Intercommunality: Deux Vallées

Government
  - Mayor (2020–2026): Rémy Cuelle
- Area^{1}: 7.25 km^{2} (2.80 sq mi)
- Elevation: 36 m (118 ft)
- Highest elevation: 42 m (138 ft)
- Lowest elevation: 32 m (105 ft)
- Population (2023): 1,142
  - Density: 158/km^{2} (408/sq mi)
- Time zone: UTC+01:00 (CET)
  - Summer (DST): UTC+02:00 (CEST)
- INSEE/Postal code: 60423 /60150
- ^{1} French Land Register data, which excludes lakes, ponds, glaciers > 1 km^{2} (0.386 sq mi or 247 acres) and river estuaries.

Montmacq (French pronunciation: [mɔ̃mak]) is a commune in the Oise department in northern France.

== Geography ==
=== Localisation ===
Montmacq lies between Compiègne and Noyon, and is bordered to its north, east and south by the Laigue forest.

To its west lies the river Oise, which separates it from Thourotte.

== Culture ==
Montmacq is the birthplace of Emma Dobigny (1851–1925), a model for such painters as Edgar Degas, Pierre Puvis de Chavannes and Jean-Baptiste Camille Corot.

== See also ==
- Communes of the Oise department
