= Saint-Léger-aux-Bois =

Saint-Léger-aux-Bois may refer to the following places in France:

- Saint-Léger-aux-Bois, Oise, a commune in the Oise department
- Saint-Léger-aux-Bois, Seine-Maritime, a commune in the Seine-Maritime department
