= Laberlière =

- Commune
- Location of Laberlière
- Location within France Location within Hauts-de-France
- Coordinates: 49°34′44″N 2°45′46″E
- Country: France
- Region: Hauts-de-France
- Department: Oise
- Arrondissement: Compiègne
- Canton: Thourotte
- Intercommunality: Pays des Sources

Government
  - Mayor (2020–2026): Dominik Raabe
- Area^{1}: 3.49 km^{2} (1.35 sq mi)
- Elevation: 80 m (260 ft)
- Highest elevation: 127 m (417 ft)
- Lowest elevation: 63 m (207 ft)
- Population (2023): 196
  - Density: 56.2/km^{2} (145/sq mi)
- Time zone: UTC+01:00 (CET)
  - Summer (DST): UTC+02:00 (CEST)
- INSEE/Postal code: 60329 /60310
- ^{1} French Land Register data, which excludes lakes, ponds, glaciers > 1 km^{2} (0.386 sq mi or 247 acres) and river estuaries.

Laberlière (French pronunciation: [labɛʁljɛʁ]) is a commune in the Oise department in northern France.

== See also ==
- Communes of the Oise department
