= Lagny, Oise =

Lagny
- Commune
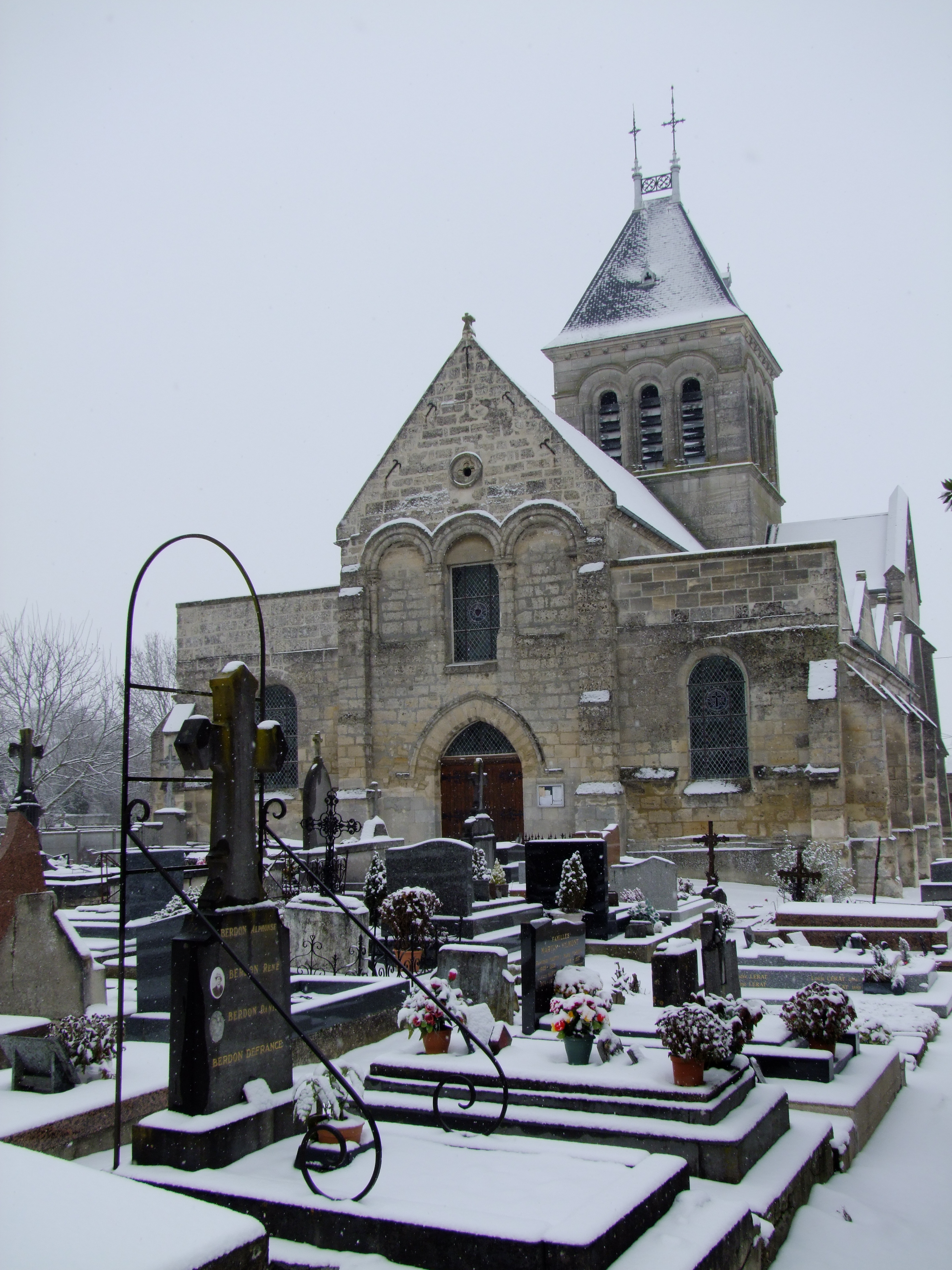
- The church in Lagny
- Location of Lagny
- Location within France Location within Hauts-de-France
- Coordinates: 49°36′50″N 2°54′55″E
- Country: France
- Region: Hauts-de-France
- Department: Oise
- Arrondissement: Compiègne
- Canton: Thourotte
- Intercommunality: Pays des Sources

Government
  - Mayor (2020–2026): Sébastien Nancel
- Area^{1}: 10.77 km^{2} (4.16 sq mi)
- Elevation: 140 m (460 ft)
- Highest elevation: 163 m (535 ft)
- Lowest elevation: 59 m (194 ft)
- Population (2023): 524
  - Density: 48.7/km^{2} (126/sq mi)
- Time zone: UTC+01:00 (CET)
  - Summer (DST): UTC+02:00 (CEST)
- INSEE/Postal code: 60340 /60310
- ^{1} French Land Register data, which excludes lakes, ponds, glaciers > 1 km^{2} (0.386 sq mi or 247 acres) and river estuaries.

Lagny (French pronunciation: [laɲi]; former Laigny-les-Chataigniers) is a commune in the Oise department in northern France.

== Population ==
Historical population
| Year | Pop. | ±% p.a. |
|---|---|---|
| 1968 | 500 | — |
| 1975 | 469 | −0.91% |
| 1982 | 479 | +0.30% |
| 1990 | 478 | −0.03% |
| 1999 | 465 | −0.31% |
| 2007 | 491 | +0.68% |
| 2012 | 552 | +2.37% |
| 2017 | 527 | −0.92% |
| 2023 | 524 | −0.10% |
Source: INSEE

== See also ==
- Communes of the Oise department
