= Chevincourt =

- Commune
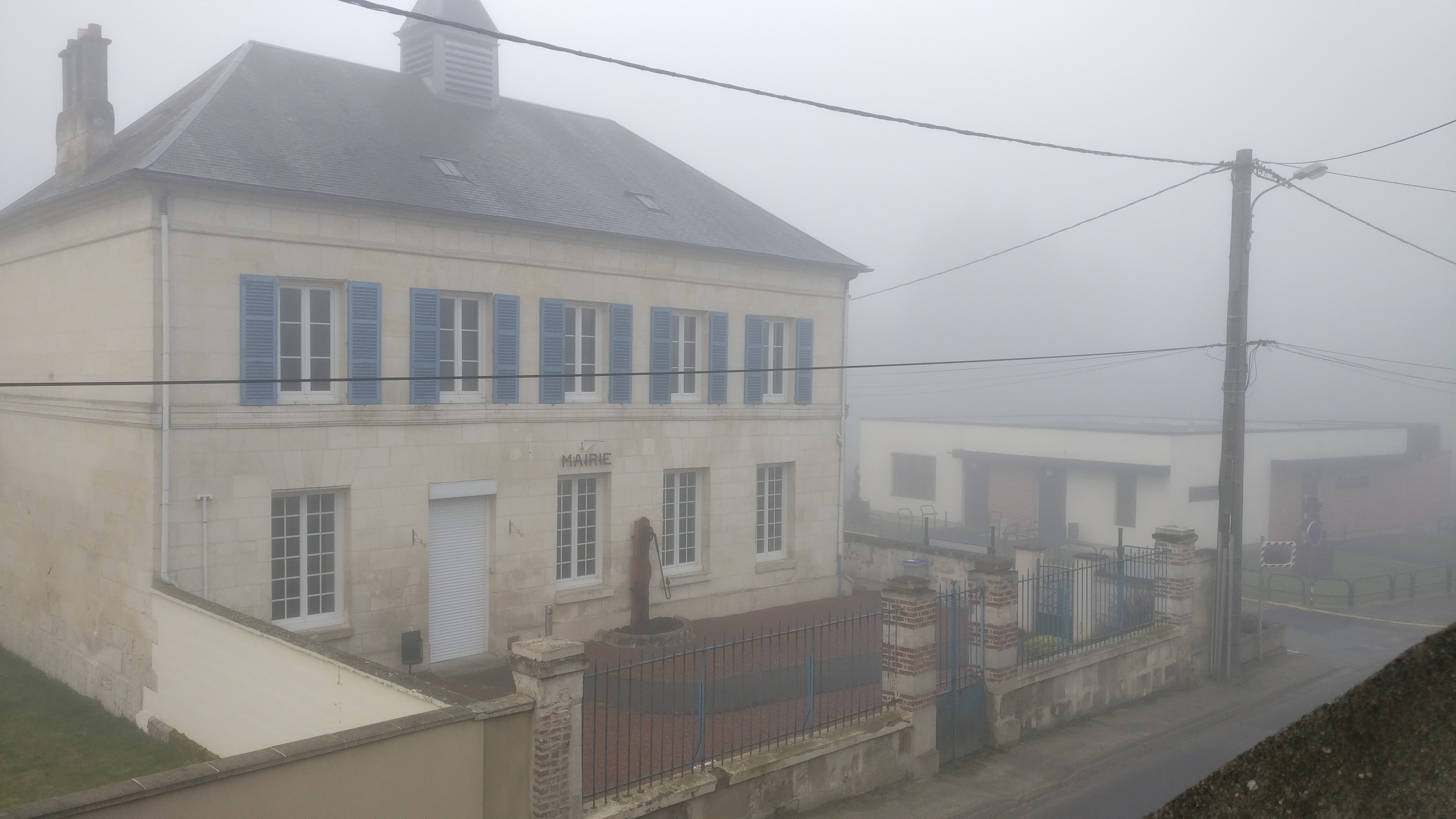
- The town hall in Chevincourt
- Location of Chevincourt
- Location within France Location within Hauts-de-France
- Coordinates: 49°30′22″N 2°50′41″E
- Country: France
- Region: Hauts-de-France
- Department: Oise
- Arrondissement: Compiègne
- Canton: Thourotte
- Intercommunality: Deux Vallées

Government
  - Mayor (2020–2026): Annie Genermont
- Area^{1}: 8.16 km^{2} (3.15 sq mi)
- Highest elevation: 181 m (594 ft)
- Lowest elevation: 37 m (121 ft)
- Population (2023): 772
  - Density: 94.6/km^{2} (245/sq mi)
- Time zone: UTC+01:00 (CET)
  - Summer (DST): UTC+02:00 (CEST)
- INSEE/Postal code: 60147 /60150
- ^{1} French Land Register data, which excludes lakes, ponds, glaciers > 1 km^{2} (0.386 sq mi or 247 acres) and river estuaries.

Chevincourt (French pronunciation: [ʃəvɛ̃kuʁ]) is a commune in the Oise department in northern France.

== See also ==
- Communes of the Oise department
