= Ognolles =

- Commune
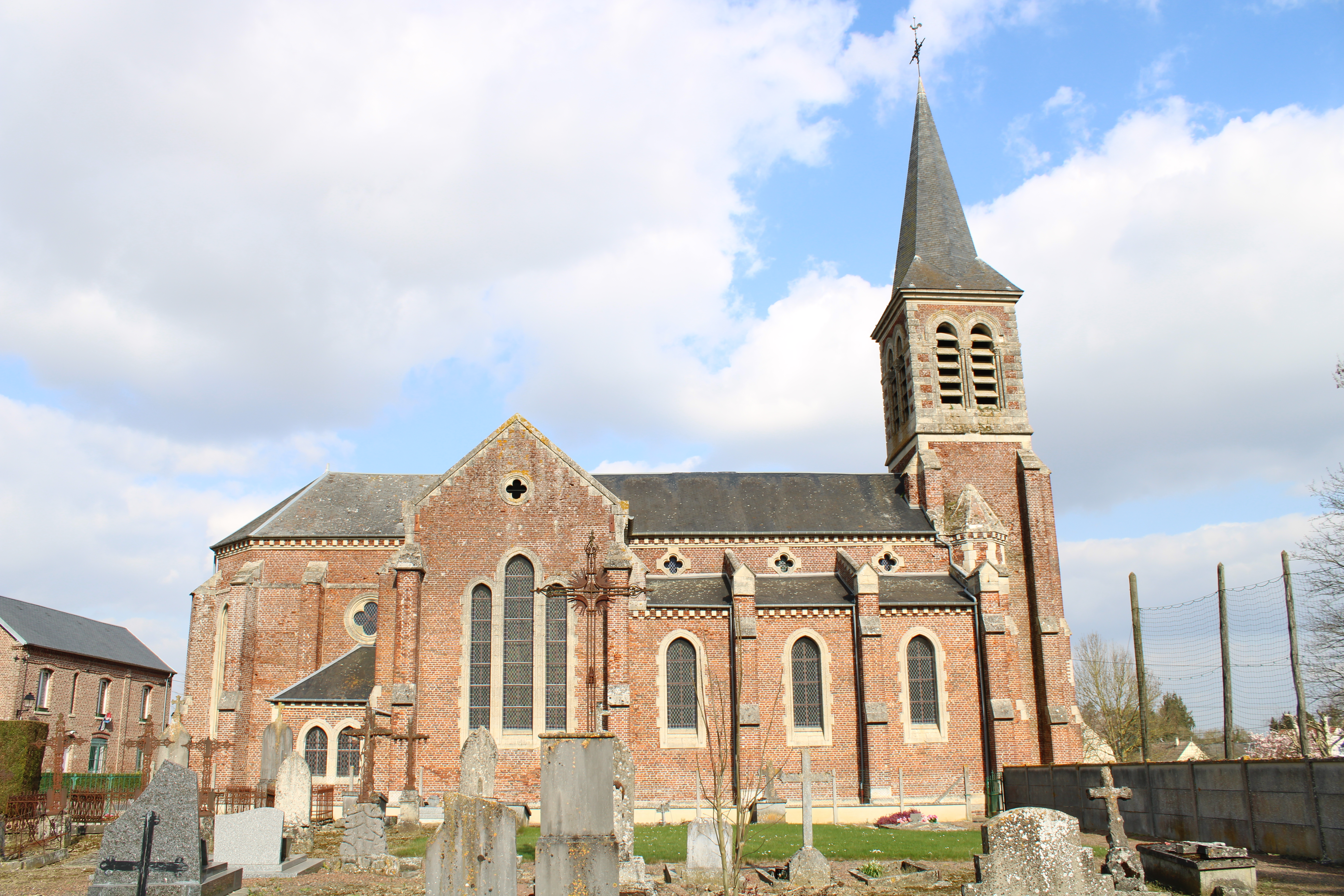
- The church in Ognolles
- Location of Ognolles
- Location within France Location within Hauts-de-France
- Coordinates: 49°41′36″N 2°54′56″E
- Country: France
- Region: Hauts-de-France
- Department: Oise
- Arrondissement: Compiègne
- Canton: Thourotte
- Intercommunality: Pays des Sources

Government
  - Mayor (2020–2026): Camille Marteau
- Area^{1}: 6.67 km^{2} (2.58 sq mi)
- Elevation: 90 m (300 ft)
- Highest elevation: 105 m (344 ft)
- Lowest elevation: 72 m (236 ft)
- Population (2023): 285
  - Density: 42.7/km^{2} (111/sq mi)
- Time zone: UTC+01:00 (CET)
  - Summer (DST): UTC+02:00 (CEST)
- INSEE/Postal code: 60474 /60310
- ^{1} French Land Register data, which excludes lakes, ponds, glaciers > 1 km^{2} (0.386 sq mi or 247 acres) and river estuaries.

Ognolles (French pronunciation: [ɔɲɔl]) is a commune in the Oise department in northern France.

== See also ==
- Communes of the Oise department
