= Crapeaumesnil =

- Commune
- Location of Crapeaumesnil
- Location within France Location within Hauts-de-France
- Coordinates: 49°38′29″N 2°47′56″E
- Country: France
- Region: Hauts-de-France
- Department: Oise
- Arrondissement: Compiègne
- Canton: Thourotte
- Intercommunality: Pays des Sources

Government
  - Mayor (2020–2026): Michel Carpentier
- Area^{1}: 4.82 km^{2} (1.86 sq mi)
- Elevation: 101 m (331 ft)
- Highest elevation: 100 m (330 ft)
- Lowest elevation: 80 m (260 ft)
- Population (2023): 225
  - Density: 46.7/km^{2} (121/sq mi)
- Time zone: UTC+01:00 (CET)
  - Summer (DST): UTC+02:00 (CEST)
- INSEE/Postal code: 60174 /60310
- ^{1} French Land Register data, which excludes lakes, ponds, glaciers > 1 km^{2} (0.386 sq mi or 247 acres) and river estuaries.

Crapeaumesnil (French pronunciation: [kʁapomenil]) is a commune in the Oise department of northern France.

== See also ==
- Communes of the Oise department
