= Solente =

- Commune
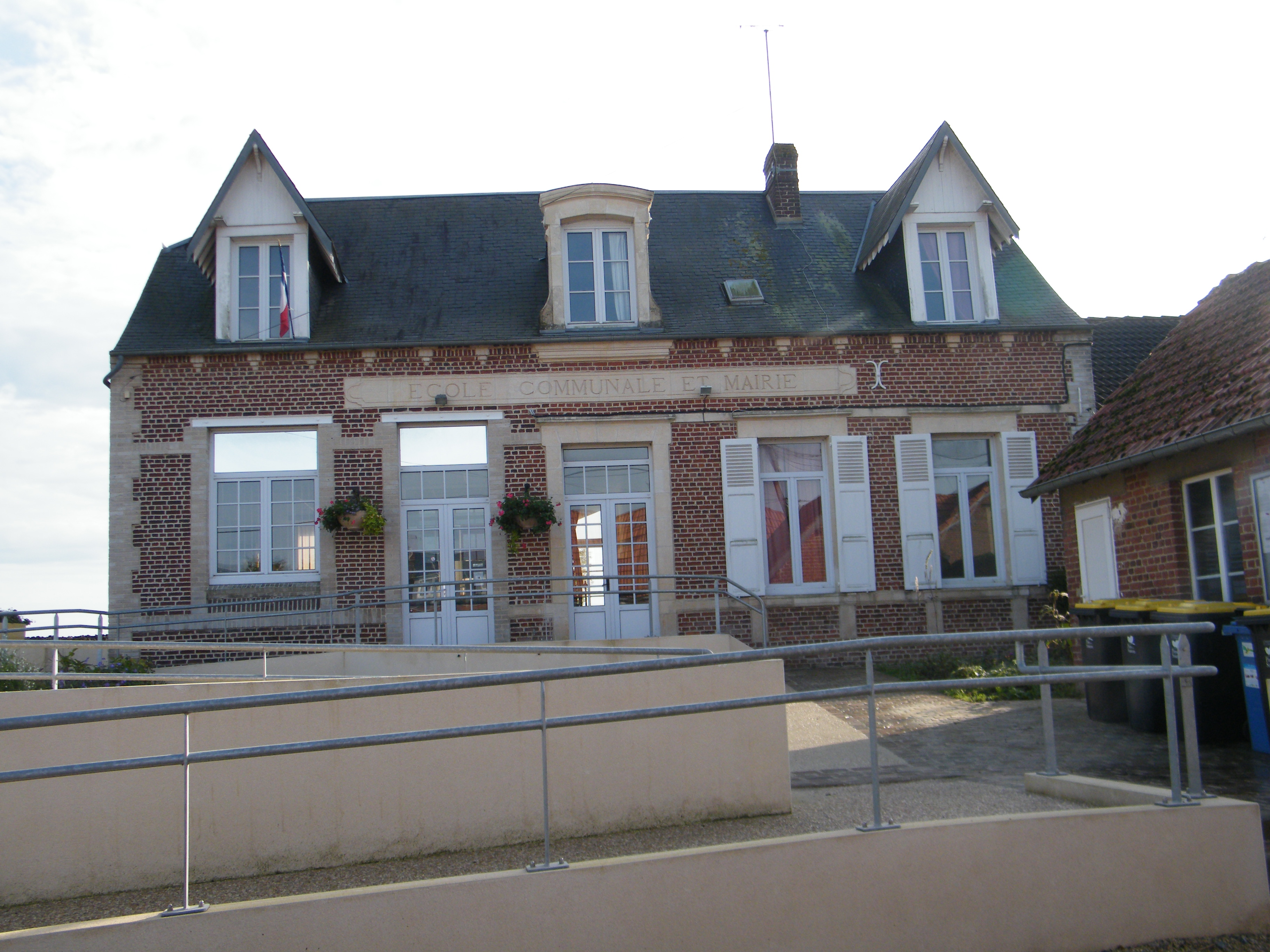
- The town hall in Solente
- Location of Solente
- Location within France Location within Hauts-de-France
- Coordinates: 49°41′59″N 2°52′46″E
- Country: France
- Region: Hauts-de-France
- Department: Oise
- Arrondissement: Compiègne
- Canton: Thourotte
- Intercommunality: Pays des Sources

Government
  - Mayor (2023–2026): Marc De Pauw
- Area^{1}: 3.06 km^{2} (1.18 sq mi)
- Elevation: 90 m (300 ft)
- Highest elevation: 104 m (341 ft)
- Lowest elevation: 78 m (256 ft)
- Population (2023): 130
  - Density: 42/km^{2} (110/sq mi)
- Time zone: UTC+01:00 (CET)
  - Summer (DST): UTC+02:00 (CEST)
- INSEE/Postal code: 60621 /60310
- ^{1} French Land Register data, which excludes lakes, ponds, glaciers > 1 km^{2} (0.386 sq mi or 247 acres) and river estuaries.

Solente (French pronunciation: [sɔlɑ̃t]) is a commune in the Oise department in northern France.

== See also ==
- Communes of the Oise department
