= Dives, Oise =

Dives
- Commune
- Location of Dives
- Location within France Location within Hauts-de-France
- Coordinates: 49°35′18″N 2°53′20″E
- Country: France
- Region: Hauts-de-France
- Department: Oise
- Arrondissement: Compiègne
- Canton: Thourotte
- Intercommunality: Pays des Sources

Government
  - Mayor (2020–2026): Jean-Pierre Leonard
- Area^{1}: 8.29 km^{2} (3.20 sq mi)
- Elevation: 60 m (200 ft)
- Highest elevation: 153 m (502 ft)
- Lowest elevation: 52 m (171 ft)
- Population (2023): 376
  - Density: 45.4/km^{2} (117/sq mi)
- Time zone: UTC+01:00 (CET)
  - Summer (DST): UTC+02:00 (CEST)
- INSEE/Postal code: 60198 /60310
- ^{1} French Land Register data, which excludes lakes, ponds, glaciers > 1 km^{2} (0.386 sq mi or 247 acres) and river estuaries.

Dives (French pronunciation: [div]) is a commune in the Oise department in northern France.

== See also ==
- Communes of the Oise department
