= Pimprez =

- Commune
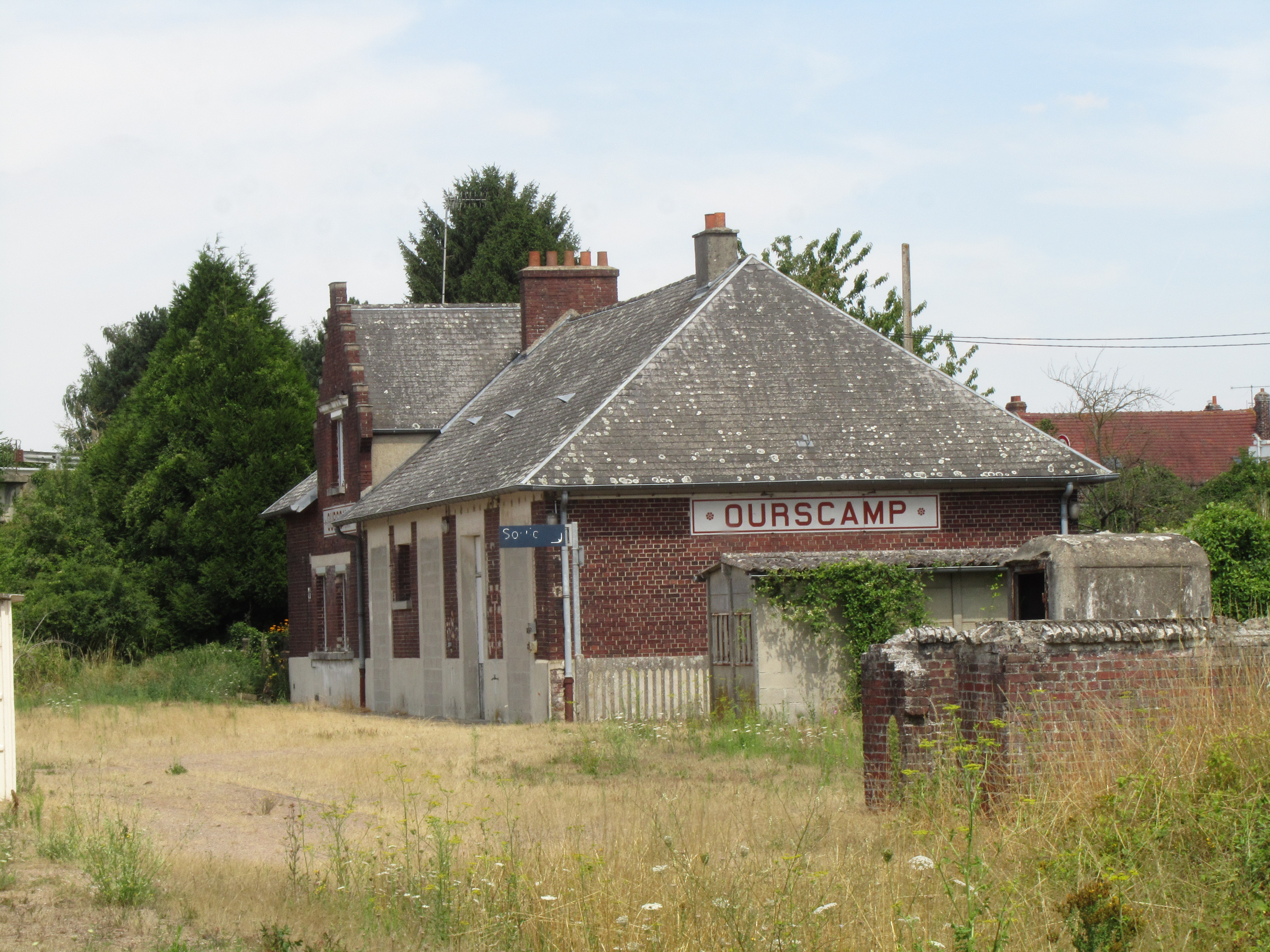
- The Ourscamp station building in Pimprez

- Coat of arms
- Location of Pimprez
- Location within France Location within Hauts-de-France
- Coordinates: 49°30′55″N 2°57′10″E
- Country: France
- Region: Hauts-de-France
- Department: Oise
- Arrondissement: Compiègne
- Canton: Thourotte
- Intercommunality: Deux Vallées

Government
  - Mayor (2020–2026): Pascal Lefevre
- Area^{1}: 9.49 km^{2} (3.66 sq mi)
- Highest elevation: 56 m (184 ft)
- Lowest elevation: 32 m (105 ft)
- Population (2023): 848
  - Density: 89.4/km^{2} (231/sq mi)
- Time zone: UTC+01:00 (CET)
  - Summer (DST): UTC+02:00 (CEST)
- INSEE/Postal code: 60492 /60170
- ^{1} French Land Register data, which excludes lakes, ponds, glaciers > 1 km^{2} (0.386 sq mi or 247 acres) and river estuaries.

Pimprez (French pronunciation: [pɛ̃pʁe]) is a commune in the Oise department in northern France.

== See also ==
- Communes of the Oise department
