= Arrondissement of Compiègne =

Coordinates: 49°25′N 2°49′E

Compiègne
- Arrondissement
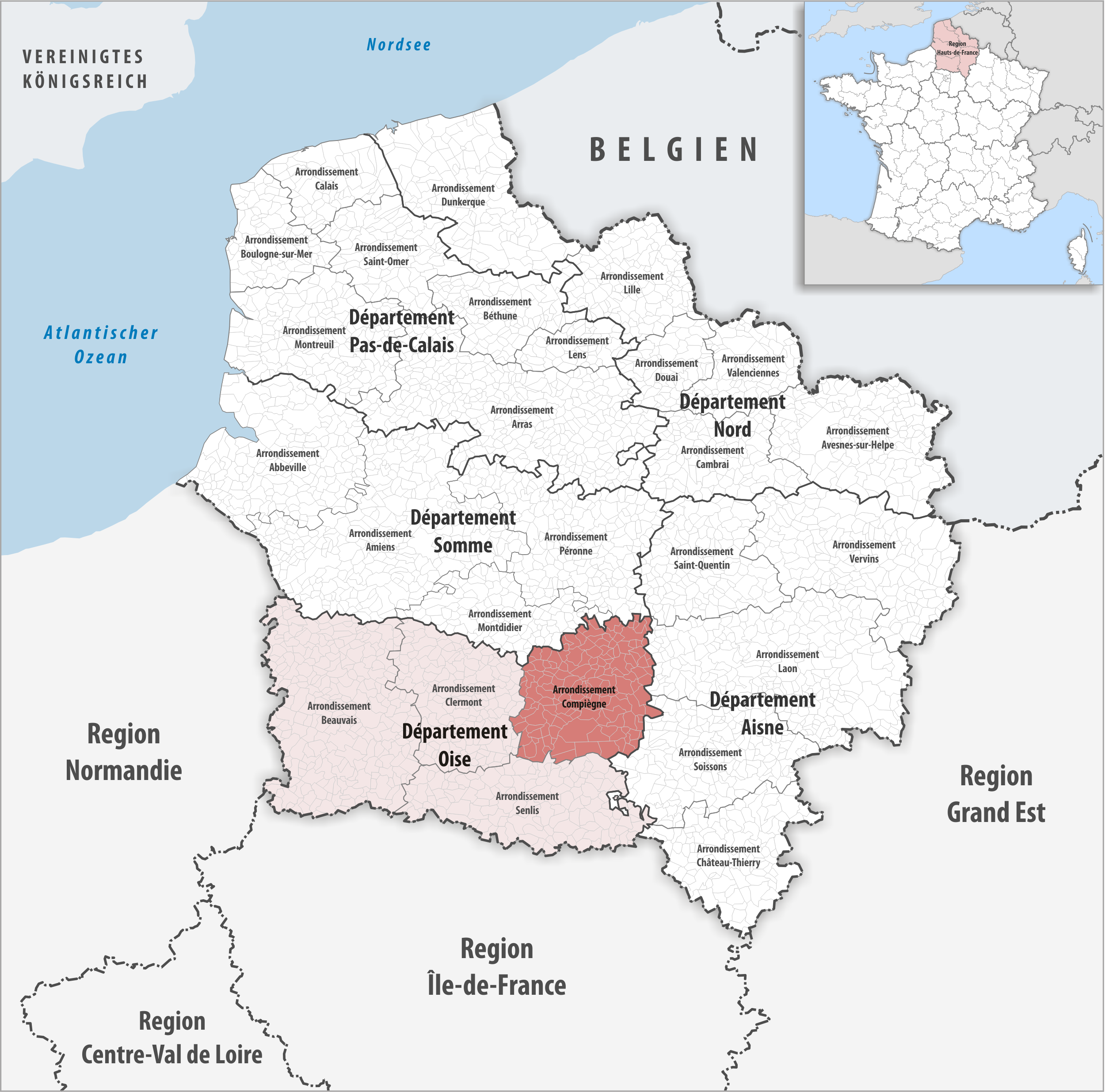
- Location within the region Hauts-de-France
- Country: France
- Region: Hauts-de-France
- Department: Oise
- No. of communes: {{{nbcomm}}}
- Area: 1,274.5 km^{2} (492.1 sq mi)
- Population (2023): 182,430
  - Density: 143.14/km^{2} (370.73/sq mi)
- INSEE code: 603

The arrondissement of Compiègne is an arrondissement of France in the Oise department in the Hauts-de-France region. It has 156 communes. Its population is 182,130 (2021), and its area is 1,274.5 km^{2} (492.1 sq mi).

== Composition ==
The communes of the arrondissement of Compiègne are:

1. Amy (60011)
2. Antheuil-Portes (60019)
3. Appilly (60021)
4. Armancourt (60023)
5. Arsy (60024)
6. Attichy (60025)
7. Autrêches (60032)
8. Avricourt (60035)
9. Babœuf (60037)
10. Bailly (60043)
11. Baugy (60048)
12. Beaugies-sous-Bois (60052)
13. Beaulieu-les-Fontaines (60053)
14. Beaurains-lès-Noyon (60055)
15. Béhéricourt (60059)
16. Belloy (60061)
17. Berlancourt (60062)
18. Berneuil-sur-Aisne (60064)
19. Bienville (60070)
20. Biermont (60071)
21. Bitry (60072)
22. Boulogne-la-Grasse (60093)
23. Braisnes-sur-Aronde (60099)
24. Brétigny (60105)
25. Bussy (60117)
26. Caisnes (60118)
27. Cambronne-lès-Ribécourt (60119)
28. Campagne (60121)
29. Candor (60124)
30. Canly (60125)
31. Cannectancourt (60126)
32. Canny-sur-Matz (60127)
33. Carlepont (60129)
34. Catigny (60132)
35. Chelles (60145)
36. Chevincourt (60147)
37. Chevrières (60149)
38. Chiry-Ourscamp (60150)
39. Choisy-au-Bac (60151)
40. Clairoix (60156)
41. Compiègne (60159)
42. Conchy-les-Pots (60160)
43. Coudun (60166)
44. Couloisy (60167)
45. Courtieux (60171)
46. Crapeaumesnil (60174)
47. Crisolles (60181)
48. Croutoy (60184)
49. Cuise-la-Motte (60188)
50. Cuts (60189)
51. Cuvilly (60191)
52. Cuy (60192)
53. Dives (60198)
54. Écuvilly (60204)
55. Élincourt-Sainte-Marguerite (60206)
56. Estrées-Saint-Denis (60223)
57. Évricourt (60227)
58. Le Fayel (60229)
59. Flavy-le-Meldeux (60236)
60. Francières (60254)
61. Fréniches (60255)
62. Fresnières (60258)
63. Frétoy-le-Château (60263)
64. Genvry (60270)
65. Giraumont (60273)
66. Golancourt (60278)
67. Gournay-sur-Aronde (60281)
68. Grandfresnoy (60284)
69. Grandrû (60287)
70. Guiscard (60291)
71. Gury (60292)
72. Hainvillers (60294)
73. Hautefontaine (60305)
74. Hémévillers (60308)
75. Houdancourt (60318)
76. Janville (60323)
77. Jaulzy (60324)
78. Jaux (60325)
79. Jonquières (60326)
80. Laberlière (60329)
81. Lachelle (60337)
82. Lacroix-Saint-Ouen (60338)
83. Lagny (60340)
84. Larbroye (60348)
85. Lassigny (60350)
86. Lataule (60351)
87. Libermont (60362)
88. Longueil-Annel (60368)
89. Longueil-Sainte-Marie (60369)
90. Machemont (60373)
91. Marest-sur-Matz (60378)
92. Mareuil-la-Motte (60379)
93. Margny-aux-Cerises (60381)
94. Margny-lès-Compiègne (60382)
95. Margny-sur-Matz (60383)
96. Marquéglise (60386)
97. Maucourt (60389)
98. Mélicocq (60392)
99. Le Meux (60402)
100. Monchy-Humières (60408)
101. Mondescourt (60410)
102. Montmacq (60423)
103. Montmartin (60424)
104. Morlincourt (60431)
105. Mortemer (60434)
106. Moulin-sous-Touvent (60438)
107. Moyvillers (60441)
108. Muirancourt (60443)
109. Nampcel (60445)
110. Neufvy-sur-Aronde (60449)
111. La Neuville-sur-Ressons (60459)
112. Noyon (60471)
113. Ognolles (60474)
114. Orvillers-Sorel (60483)
115. Passel (60488)
116. Pierrefonds (60491)
117. Pimprez (60492)
118. Le Plessis-Brion (60501)
119. Plessis-de-Roye (60499)
120. Le Plessis-Patte-d'Oie (60502)
121. Pont-l'Évêque (60506)
122. Pontoise-lès-Noyon (60507)
123. Porquéricourt (60511)
124. Quesmy (60519)
125. Remy (60531)
126. Ressons-sur-Matz (60533)
127. Rethondes (60534)
128. Ribécourt-Dreslincourt (60537)
129. Ricquebourg (60538)
130. Rivecourt (60540)
131. Roye-sur-Matz (60558)
132. Saint-Crépin-aux-Bois (60569)
133. Saint-Étienne-Roilaye (60572)
134. Saint-Jean-aux-Bois (60579)
135. Saint-Léger-aux-Bois (60582)
136. Saint-Pierre-lès-Bitry (60593)
137. Saint-Sauveur (60597)
138. Salency (60603)
139. Sempigny (60610)
140. Sermaize (60617)
141. Solente (60621)
142. Suzoy (60625)
143. Thiescourt (60632)
144. Thourotte (60636)
145. Tracy-le-Mont (60641)
146. Tracy-le-Val (60642)
147. Trosly-Breuil (60647)
148. Vandélicourt (60654)
149. Varesnes (60655)
150. Vauchelles (60657)
151. Venette (60665)
152. Vieux-Moulin (60674)
153. Vignemont (60675)
154. Ville (60676)
155. Villers-sur-Coudun (60689)
156. Villeselve (60693)

== History ==
The arrondissement of Compiègne was created in 1800.

As a result of the reorganisation of the cantons of France which came into effect in 2015, the borders of the cantons are no longer related to the borders of the arrondissements. The cantons of the arrondissement of Compiègne were, as of January 2015:

1. Attichy
2. Compiègne-Nord
3. Compiègne-Sud-Est
4. Compiègne-Sud-Ouest
5. Estrées-Saint-Denis
6. Guiscard
7. Lassigny
8. Noyon
9. Ressons-sur-Matz
10. Ribécourt-Dreslincourt
