= Mareuil-la-Motte =

- Commune
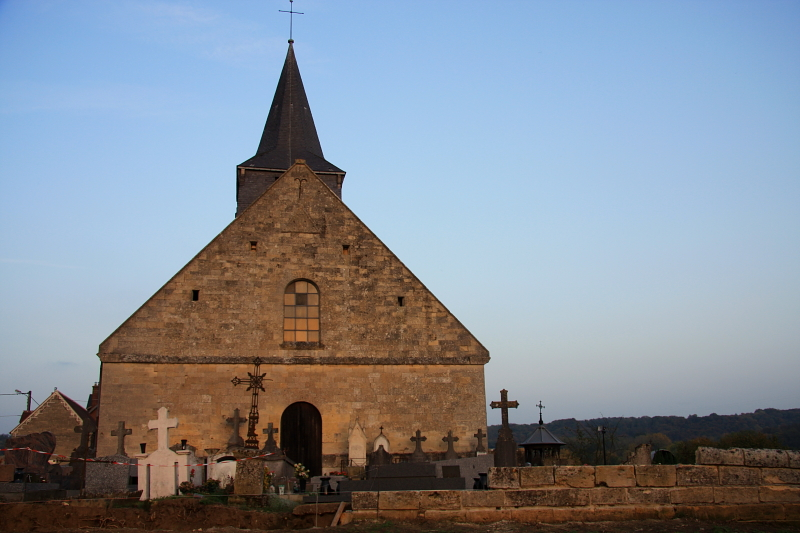
- The church in Mareuil-la-Motte
- Location of Mareuil-la-Motte
- Location within France Location within Hauts-de-France
- Coordinates: 49°32′45″N 2°47′27″E
- Country: France
- Region: Hauts-de-France
- Department: Oise
- Arrondissement: Compiègne
- Canton: Thourotte
- Intercommunality: Pays des Sources

Government
  - Mayor (2020–2026): Michèle Swynghedauw
- Area^{1}: 9.17 km^{2} (3.54 sq mi)
- Elevation: 83 m (272 ft)
- Highest elevation: 188 m (617 ft)
- Lowest elevation: 63 m (207 ft)
- Population (2023): 616
  - Density: 67.2/km^{2} (174/sq mi)
- Time zone: UTC+01:00 (CET)
  - Summer (DST): UTC+02:00 (CEST)
- INSEE/Postal code: 60379 /60490
- ^{1} French Land Register data, which excludes lakes, ponds, glaciers > 1 km^{2} (0.386 sq mi or 247 acres) and river estuaries.

Mareuil-la-Motte (French pronunciation: [maʁœj la mɔt]) is a commune in the Oise department in northern France.

== Population ==
Historical population
Year	Pop.	±% p.a.
1968	313	—
1975	261	−2.56%
1982	364	+4.87%
1990	489	+3.76%
1999	587	+2.05%
2007	597	+0.21%
2012	628	+1.02%
2017	641	+0.41%
2023	616	−0.66%
Source: INSEE

== See also ==
- Communes of the Oise department
