= Le Plessis-Brion =

- Commune
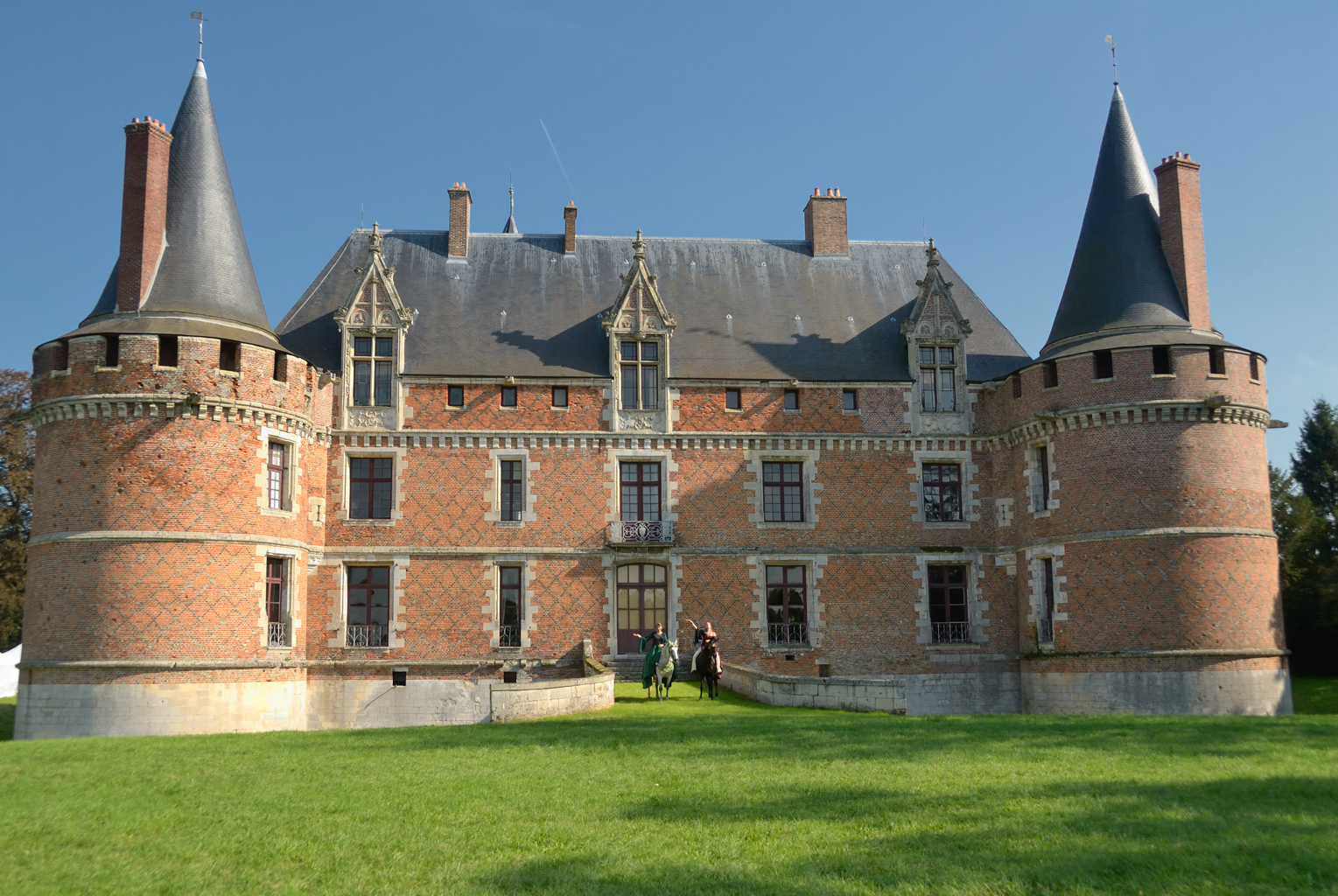
- The chateau in Le Plessis-Brion
- Location of Le Plessis-Brion
- Location within France Location within Hauts-de-France
- Coordinates: 49°27′57″N 2°53′28″E
- Country: France
- Region: Hauts-de-France
- Department: Oise
- Arrondissement: Compiègne
- Canton: Thourotte
- Intercommunality: Deux Vallées

Government
  - Mayor (2020–2026): Jean-Pierre Damien
- Area^{1}: 7.47 km^{2} (2.88 sq mi)
- Highest elevation: 59 m (194 ft)
- Lowest elevation: 33 m (108 ft)
- Population (2023): 1,298
  - Density: 174/km^{2} (450/sq mi)
- Time zone: UTC+01:00 (CET)
  - Summer (DST): UTC+02:00 (CEST)
- INSEE/Postal code: 60501 /60150
- ^{1} French Land Register data, which excludes lakes, ponds, glaciers > 1 km^{2} (0.386 sq mi or 247 acres) and river estuaries.

Le Plessis-Brion (French pronunciation: [lə plɛsi bʁijɔ̃]) is a commune in the Oise department in northern France.

== Population ==
Historical population
Year	Pop.	±% p.a.
1968	1,425	—
1975	1,422	−0.03%
1982	1,587	+1.58%
1990	1,482	−0.85%
1999	1,488	+0.04%
2007	1,460	−0.24%
2012	1,411	−0.68%
2017	1,365	−0.66%
2023	1,298	−0.84%
Source: INSEE

== See also ==
- Communes of the Oise department
