= Amy, Oise =

Amy
- Commune
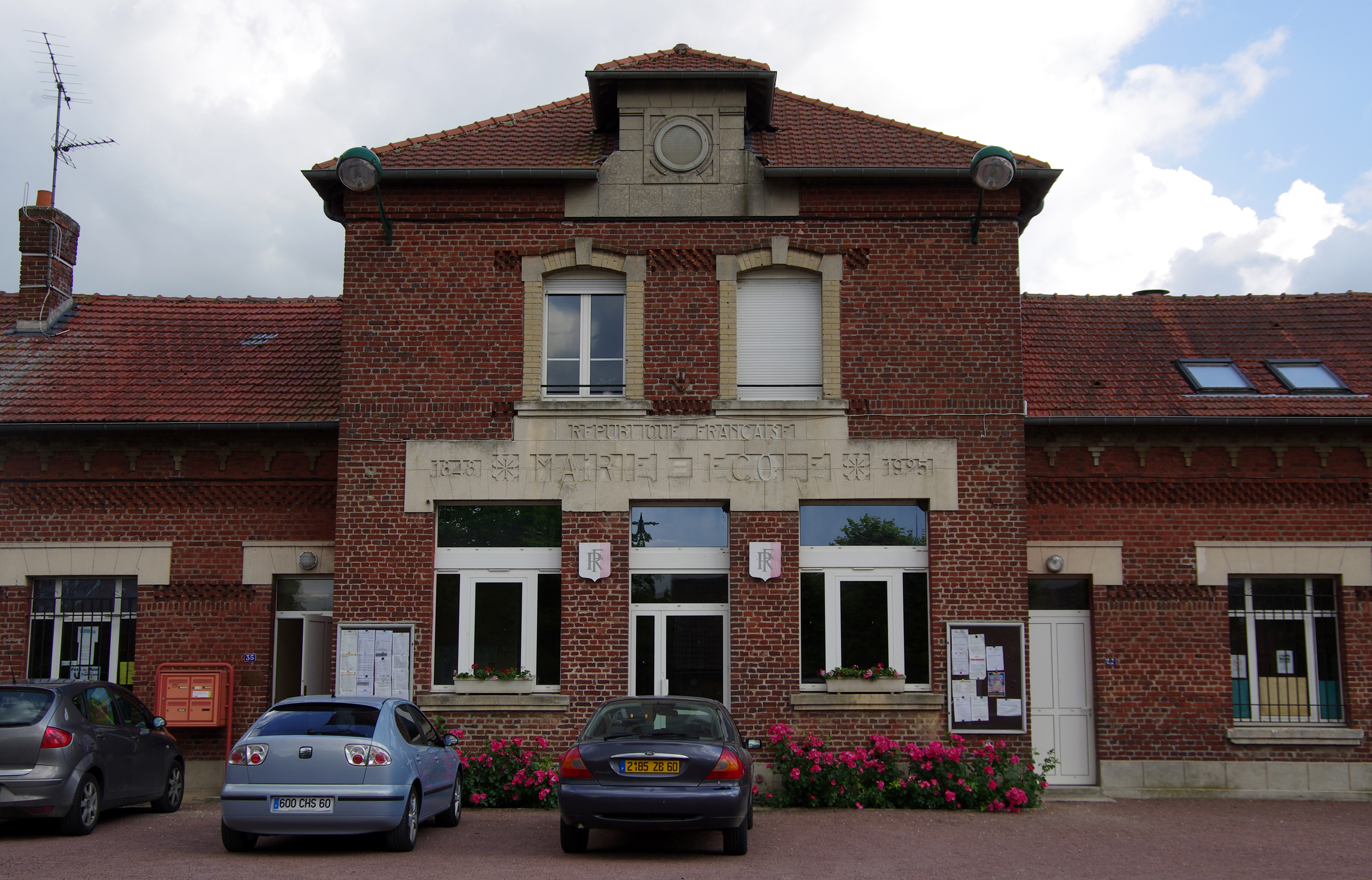
- Town hall
- Location of Amy
- Location within France Location within Hauts-de-France
- Coordinates: 49°39′07″N 2°49′12″E
- Country: France
- Region: Hauts-de-France
- Department: Oise
- Arrondissement: Compiègne
- Canton: Thourotte
- Intercommunality: Pays des Sources

Government
  - Mayor (2020–2026): Yann Guiguand
- Area^{1}: 12.58 km^{2} (4.86 sq mi)
- Elevation: 80 m (260 ft)
- Highest elevation: 97 m (318 ft)
- Lowest elevation: 76 m (249 ft)
- Population (2023): 419
  - Density: 33.3/km^{2} (86.3/sq mi)
- Time zone: UTC+01:00 (CET)
  - Summer (DST): UTC+02:00 (CEST)
- INSEE/Postal code: 60011 /60310
- ^{1} French Land Register data, which excludes lakes, ponds, glaciers > 1 km^{2} (0.386 sq mi or 247 acres) and river estuaries.

Amy (French pronunciation: [ami]) is a commune in the Oise department in northern France.

== Population ==
Historical population
Year	Pop.	±% p.a.
1968	283	—
1975	240	−2.33%
1982	272	+1.80%
1990	342	+2.90%
1999	345	+0.10%
2007	375	+1.05%
2012	371	−0.21%
2017	392	+1.11%
2023	419	+1.12%
Source: INSEE

== See also ==
- Communes of the Oise department
