= Tracy-le-Val =

- Commune
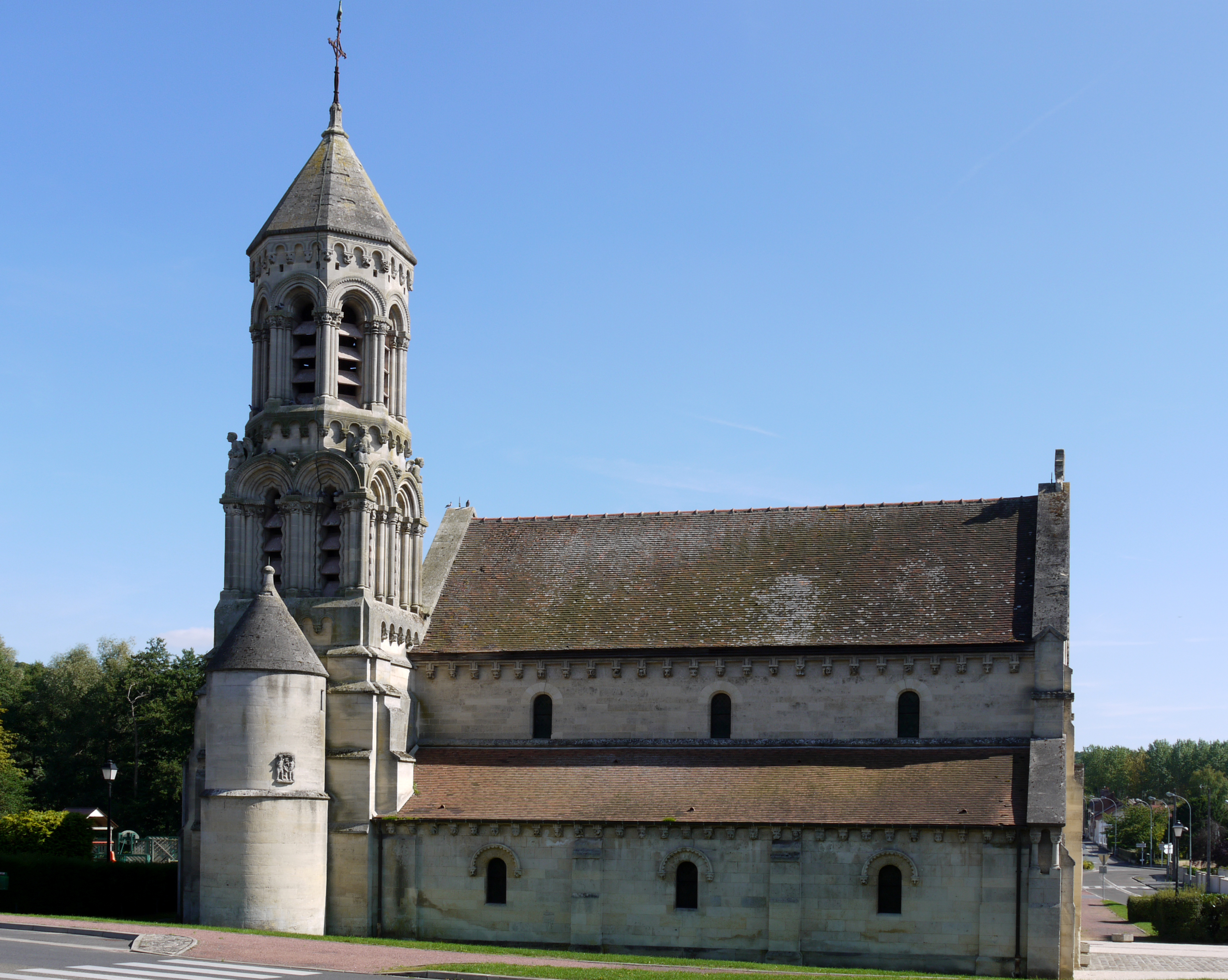
- The church in Tracy-le-Val
- Location of Tracy-le-Val
- Location within France Location within Hauts-de-France
- Coordinates: 49°29′N 3°01′E
- Country: France
- Region: Hauts-de-France
- Department: Oise
- Arrondissement: Compiègne
- Canton: Thourotte
- Intercommunality: Deux Vallées

Government
  - Mayor (2020–2026): Claude Servais
- Area^{1}: 4.69 km^{2} (1.81 sq mi)
- Elevation: 63 m (207 ft)
- Highest elevation: 147 m (482 ft)
- Lowest elevation: 45 m (148 ft)
- Population (2023): 1,037
  - Density: 221/km^{2} (573/sq mi)
- Time zone: UTC+01:00 (CET)
  - Summer (DST): UTC+02:00 (CEST)
- INSEE/Postal code: 60642 /60170
- ^{1} French Land Register data, which excludes lakes, ponds, glaciers > 1 km^{2} (0.386 sq mi or 247 acres) and river estuaries.

Tracy-le-Val (French pronunciation: [tʁasi lə val]) is a commune in the Oise department in northern France.

== See also ==
- Communes of the Oise department
