= Cambronne-lès-Ribécourt =

- Commune
- Coat of arms
- Location of Cambronne-lès-Ribécourt
- Location within France Location within Hauts-de-France
- Coordinates: 49°30′25″N 2°53′54″E
- Country: France
- Region: Hauts-de-France
- Department: Oise
- Arrondissement: Compiègne
- Canton: Thourotte
- Intercommunality: Deux Vallées

Government
  - Mayor (2020–2026): Geneviève Drela
- Area^{1}: 6.93 km^{2} (2.68 sq mi)
- Highest elevation: 162 m (531 ft)
- Lowest elevation: 32 m (105 ft)
- Population (2023): 1,831
  - Density: 264/km^{2} (684/sq mi)
- Time zone: UTC+01:00 (CET)
  - Summer (DST): UTC+02:00 (CEST)
- INSEE/Postal code: 60119 /60170
- ^{1} French Land Register data, which excludes lakes, ponds, glaciers > 1 km^{2} (0.386 sq mi or 247 acres) and river estuaries.

Cambronne-lès-Ribécourt (French pronunciation: [kɑ̃bʁɔn lɛ ʁibekuʁ], literally Cambronne near Ribécourt) is a commune in the Oise department in northern France.

== See also ==
- Communes of the Oise department
