= Vandélicourt =

- Commune
- Location of Vandélicourt
- Location within France Location within Hauts-de-France
- Coordinates: 49°30′48″N 2°47′41″E
- Country: France
- Region: Hauts-de-France
- Department: Oise
- Arrondissement: Compiègne
- Canton: Thourotte
- Intercommunality: Deux Vallées

Government
  - Mayor (2020–2026): Sandrine Baconnais
- Area^{1}: 4.67 km^{2} (1.80 sq mi)
- Elevation: 85 m (279 ft)
- Highest elevation: 109 m (358 ft)
- Lowest elevation: 42 m (138 ft)
- Population (2023): 254
  - Density: 54.4/km^{2} (141/sq mi)
- Time zone: UTC+01:00 (CET)
  - Summer (DST): UTC+02:00 (CEST)
- INSEE/Postal code: 60654 /60490
- ^{1} French Land Register data, which excludes lakes, ponds, glaciers > 1 km^{2} (0.386 sq mi or 247 acres) and river estuaries.

Vandélicourt (French pronunciation: [vɑ̃delikuʁ]) is a commune in the Oise department in northern France.

== See also ==
- Communes of the Oise department
