= Mélicocq =

- Commune
- Location of Mélicocq
- Location within France Location within Hauts-de-France
- Coordinates: 49°29′39″N 2°51′30″E
- Country: France
- Region: Hauts-de-France
- Department: Oise
- Arrondissement: Compiègne
- Canton: Thourotte
- Intercommunality: Deux Vallées

Government
  - Mayor (2020–2026): Valérie Vanpevenage
- Area^{1}: 6.53 km^{2} (2.52 sq mi)
- Elevation: 65 m (213 ft)
- Highest elevation: 137 m (449 ft)
- Lowest elevation: 36 m (118 ft)
- Population (2023): 789
  - Density: 121/km^{2} (313/sq mi)
- Time zone: UTC+01:00 (CET)
  - Summer (DST): UTC+02:00 (CEST)
- INSEE/Postal code: 60392 /60150
- ^{1} French Land Register data, which excludes lakes, ponds, glaciers > 1 km^{2} (0.386 sq mi or 247 acres) and river estuaries.

Mélicocq (French pronunciation: [melikɔk]) is a commune in the Oise department in northern France.

== See also ==
- Communes of the Oise department
