= Écuvilly =

- Commune
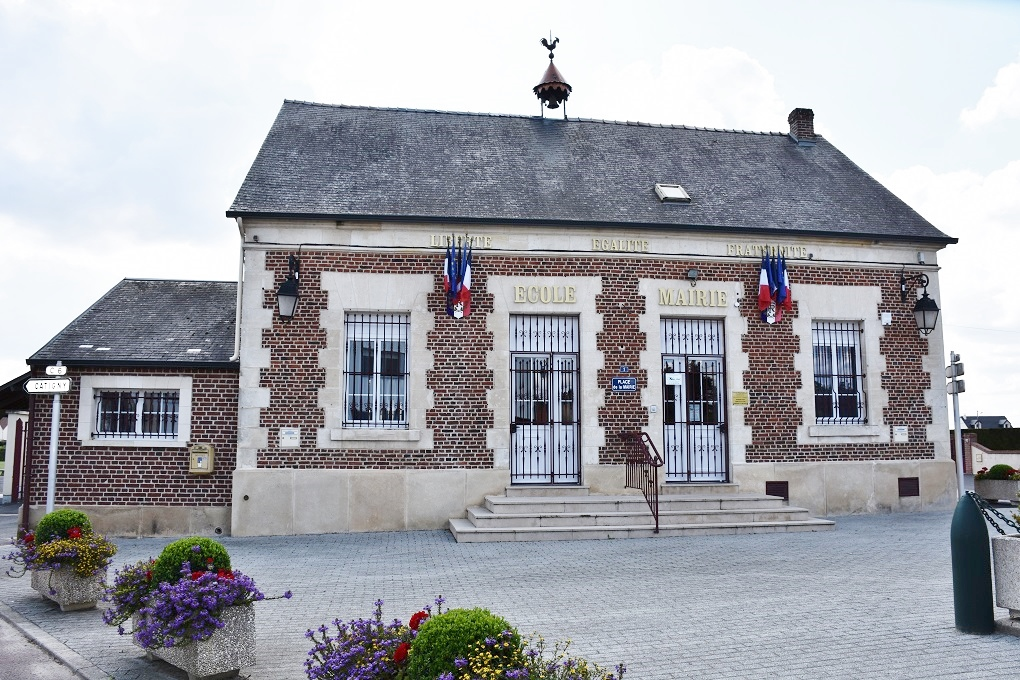
- The town hall in Écuvilly
- Location of Écuvilly
- Location within France Location within Hauts-de-France
- Coordinates: 49°39′03″N 2°55′15″E
- Country: France
- Region: Hauts-de-France
- Department: Oise
- Arrondissement: Compiègne
- Canton: Thourotte
- Intercommunality: Pays des Sources

Government
  - Mayor (2020–2026): Thierry Lacroix
- Area^{1}: 5.77 km^{2} (2.23 sq mi)
- Highest elevation: 94 m (308 ft)
- Lowest elevation: 56 m (184 ft)
- Population (2023): 297
  - Density: 51.5/km^{2} (133/sq mi)
- Time zone: UTC+01:00 (CET)
  - Summer (DST): UTC+02:00 (CEST)
- INSEE/Postal code: 60204 /60310
- ^{1} French Land Register data, which excludes lakes, ponds, glaciers > 1 km^{2} (0.386 sq mi or 247 acres) and river estuaries.

Écuvilly is a commune in the Oise department in northern France.

== See also ==
- Communes of the Oise department
