= Cannectancourt =

- Commune
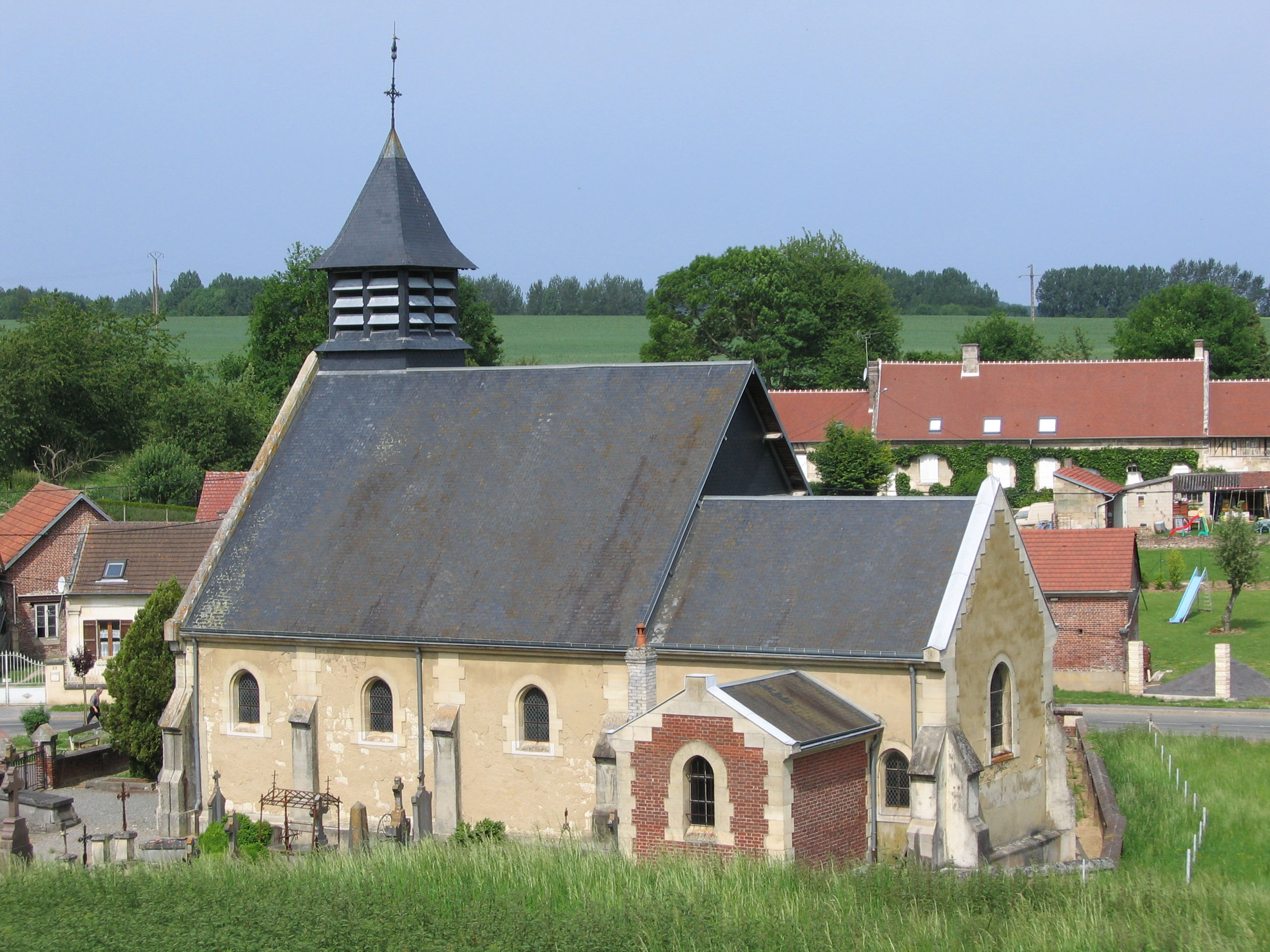
- The church in Cannectancourt

- Coat of arms
- Location of Cannectancourt
- Location within France Location within Hauts-de-France
- Coordinates: 49°33′22″N 2°54′16″E
- Country: France
- Region: Hauts-de-France
- Department: Oise
- Arrondissement: Compiègne
- Canton: Thourotte
- Intercommunality: Pays des Sources

Government
  - Mayor (2020–2026): Jean-Paul Knauss
- Area^{1}: 7.57 km^{2} (2.92 sq mi)
- Elevation: 80 m (260 ft)
- Highest elevation: 182 m (597 ft)
- Lowest elevation: 46 m (151 ft)
- Population (2023): 515
  - Density: 68.0/km^{2} (176/sq mi)
- Time zone: UTC+01:00 (CET)
  - Summer (DST): UTC+02:00 (CEST)
- INSEE/Postal code: 60126 /60310
- ^{1} French Land Register data, which excludes lakes, ponds, glaciers > 1 km^{2} (0.386 sq mi or 247 acres) and river estuaries.

Cannectancourt (French pronunciation: [kanɛktɑ̃kuʁ]) is a commune in the Oise department in northern France.

== See also ==
- Communes of the Oise department
