= Machemont =

- Commune
- Location of Machemont
- Location within France Location within Hauts-de-France
- Coordinates: 49°29′51″N 2°52′29″E
- Country: France
- Region: Hauts-de-France
- Department: Oise
- Arrondissement: Compiègne
- Canton: Thourotte
- Intercommunality: Deux Vallées

Government
  - Mayor (2020–2026): Dominique Pastot
- Area^{1}: 6.33 km^{2} (2.44 sq mi)
- Elevation: 144 m (472 ft)
- Highest elevation: 173 m (568 ft)
- Lowest elevation: 36 m (118 ft)
- Population (2023): 830
  - Density: 130/km^{2} (340/sq mi)
- Time zone: UTC+01:00 (CET)
  - Summer (DST): UTC+02:00 (CEST)
- INSEE/Postal code: 60373 /60150
- ^{1} French Land Register data, which excludes lakes, ponds, glaciers > 1 km^{2} (0.386 sq mi or 247 acres) and river estuaries.

Machemont (French pronunciation: [maʃmɔ̃]) is a commune in the Oise department in northern France.

== Population ==
Historical population
| Year | Pop. | ±% p.a. |
|---|---|---|
| 1968 | 719 | — |
| 1975 | 665 | −1.11% |
| 1982 | 592 | −1.65% |
| 1990 | 687 | +1.88% |
| 1999 | 748 | +0.95% |
| 2007 | 738 | −0.17% |
| 2012 | 707 | −0.85% |
| 2017 | 718 | +0.31% |
| 2023 | 830 | +2.45% |
Source: INSEE

== See also ==
- Communes of the Oise department
