= Fresnières =

- Commune
- Location of Fresnières
- Location within France Location within Hauts-de-France
- Coordinates: 49°37′22″N 2°48′54″E
- Country: France
- Region: Hauts-de-France
- Department: Oise
- Arrondissement: Compiègne
- Canton: Thourotte
- Intercommunality: Pays des Sources

Government
  - Mayor (2020–2026): Jean-Claude Gout
- Area^{1}: 2.97 km^{2} (1.15 sq mi)
- Elevation: 78 m (256 ft)
- Highest elevation: 98 m (322 ft)
- Lowest elevation: 76 m (249 ft)
- Population (2023): 154
  - Density: 51.9/km^{2} (134/sq mi)
- Time zone: UTC+01:00 (CET)
  - Summer (DST): UTC+02:00 (CEST)
- INSEE/Postal code: 60258 /60310
- ^{1} French Land Register data, which excludes lakes, ponds, glaciers > 1 km^{2} (0.386 sq mi or 247 acres) and river estuaries.

Fresnières (French pronunciation: [fʁɛnjɛʁ]) is a commune in the Oise department in northern France.

== Population ==
Historical population
Year	Pop.	±% p.a.
1968	118	—
1975	101	−2.20%
1982	94	−1.02%
1990	113	+2.33%
1999	123	+0.95%
2007	163	+3.58%
2012	172	+1.08%
2017	164	−0.95%
2023	154	−1.04%
Source: INSEE

== See also ==
- Communes of the Oise department
