= Longueil-Annel =

- Commune
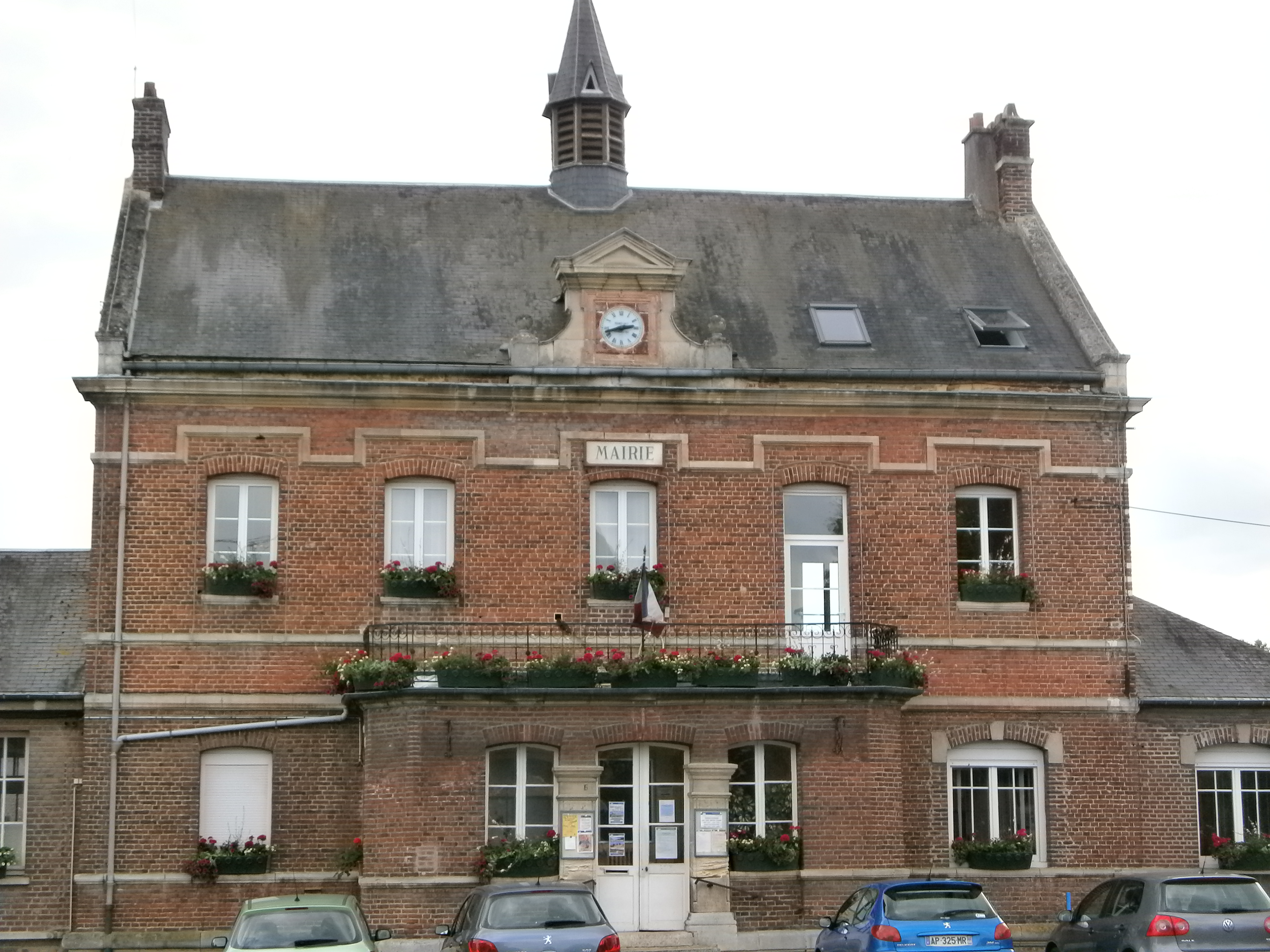
- The town hall in Longueil-Annel

- Coat of arms
- Location of Longueil-Annel
- Location within France Location within Hauts-de-France
- Coordinates: 49°28′14″N 2°51′45″E
- Country: France
- Region: Hauts-de-France
- Department: Oise
- Arrondissement: Compiègne
- Canton: Thourotte
- Intercommunality: Deux Vallées

Government
  - Mayor (2020–2026): Daniel Beurdeley
- Area^{1}: 5.94 km^{2} (2.29 sq mi)
- Highest elevation: 145 m (476 ft)
- Lowest elevation: 33 m (108 ft)
- Population (2023): 2,586
  - Density: 435/km^{2} (1,130/sq mi)
- Time zone: UTC+01:00 (CET)
  - Summer (DST): UTC+02:00 (CEST)
- INSEE/Postal code: 60368 /60150
- ^{1} French Land Register data, which excludes lakes, ponds, glaciers > 1 km^{2} (0.386 sq mi or 247 acres) and river estuaries.

Longueil-Annel (French pronunciation: [lɔ̃ɡœj anɛl]) is a commune in the Oise department in northern France.

== Population ==
Historical population
Year	Pop.	±% p.a.
1968	2,101	—
1975	2,666	+3.46%
1982	2,649	−0.09%
1990	2,442	−1.01%
1999	2,347	−0.44%
2007	2,287	−0.32%
2012	2,472	+1.57%
2017	2,622	+1.19%
2023	2,586	−0.23%
Source: INSEE

== See also ==
- Communes of the Oise department
