= Avricourt, Oise =

Avricourt
- Commune
- Coat of arms
- Location of Avricourt
- Location within France Location within Hauts-de-France
- Coordinates: 49°39′23″N 2°51′48″E
- Country: France
- Region: Hauts-de-France
- Department: Oise
- Arrondissement: Compiègne
- Canton: Thourotte
- Intercommunality: CC Pays Sources

Government
  - Mayor (2020–2026): Roger Parzybut
- Area^{1}: 7.01 km^{2} (2.71 sq mi)
- Elevation: 76 m (249 ft)
- Highest elevation: 95 m (312 ft)
- Lowest elevation: 73 m (240 ft)
- Population (2023): 232
  - Density: 33.1/km^{2} (85.7/sq mi)
- Time zone: UTC+01:00 (CET)
  - Summer (DST): UTC+02:00 (CEST)
- INSEE/Postal code: 60035 /60310
- ^{1} French Land Register data, which excludes lakes, ponds, glaciers > 1 km^{2} (0.386 sq mi or 247 acres) and river estuaries.

Avricourt (French pronunciation: [avʁikuʁ]) is a commune in the Oise department in northern France.

== Population ==
Historical population
Year	Pop.	±% p.a.
1968	185	—
1975	174	−0.87%
1982	188	+1.11%
1990	195	+0.46%
1999	216	+1.14%
2007	253	+2.00%
2012	259	+0.47%
2017	260	+0.08%
2023	232	−1.88%
Source: INSEE

== See also ==
- Communes of the Oise department
