= Canton of Thourotte =

Canton of France

Coordinates: 49.48°N 2.88°E

- Canton
- Situation of the canton of Thourotte in the department of Oise
- Country: France
- Region: Hauts-de-France
- Department: Oise
- No. of communes: {{{nbcomm}}}
- Population (2023): 32,539
- INSEE code: 6021

The canton of Thourotte is an administrative division of the Oise department, northern France. It was created at the French canton reorganisation which came into effect in March 2015. Its seat is in Thourotte.

It consists of the following communes:

1. Amy
2. Avricourt
3. Bailly
4. Beaulieu-les-Fontaines
5. Cambronne-lès-Ribécourt
6. Candor
7. Cannectancourt
8. Canny-sur-Matz
9. Chevincourt
10. Chiry-Ourscamp
11. Crapeaumesnil
12. Cuy
13. Dives
14. Écuvilly
15. Élincourt-Sainte-Marguerite
16. Évricourt
17. Fresnières
18. Gury
19. Laberlière
20. Lagny
21. Lassigny
22. Longueil-Annel
23. Machemont
24. Marest-sur-Matz
25. Mareuil-la-Motte
26. Margny-aux-Cerises
27. Mélicocq
28. Montmacq
29. Ognolles
30. Pimprez
31. Plessis-de-Roye
32. Le Plessis-Brion
33. Ribécourt-Dreslincourt
34. Roye-sur-Matz
35. Saint-Léger-aux-Bois
36. Solente
37. Thiescourt
38. Thourotte
39. Tracy-le-Val
40. Vandélicourt
