= Beaulieu-les-Fontaines =

- Commune
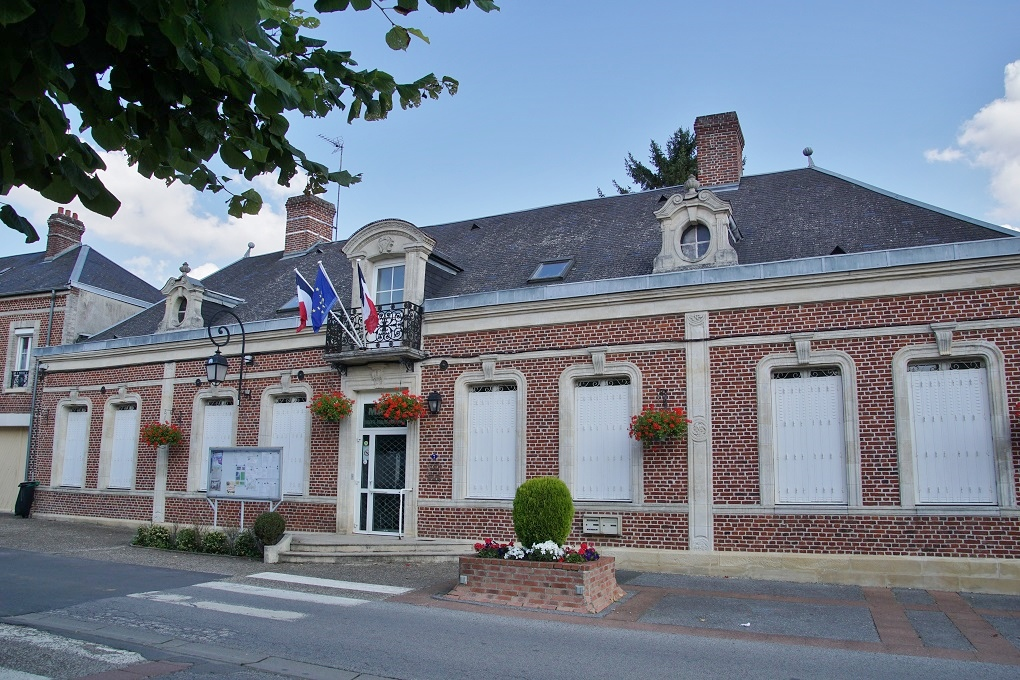
- The town hall in Beaulieu-les-Fontaines

- Coat of arms
- Location of Beaulieu-les-Fontaines
- Location within France Location within Hauts-de-France
- Coordinates: 49°39′39″N 2°54′48″E
- Country: France
- Region: Hauts-de-France
- Department: Oise
- Arrondissement: Compiègne
- Canton: Thourotte
- Intercommunality: Pays des Sources

Government
  - Mayor (2020–2026): Robert Piechon
- Area^{1}: 12.6 km^{2} (4.9 sq mi)
- Elevation: 92 m (302 ft)
- Highest elevation: 106 m (348 ft)
- Lowest elevation: 67 m (220 ft)
- Population (2023): 563
  - Density: 44.7/km^{2} (116/sq mi)
- Time zone: UTC+01:00 (CET)
  - Summer (DST): UTC+02:00 (CEST)
- INSEE/Postal code: 60053 /60310
- ^{1} French Land Register data, which excludes lakes, ponds, glaciers > 1 km^{2} (0.386 sq mi or 247 acres) and river estuaries.

Beaulieu-les-Fontaines (French pronunciation: [boljø le fɔ̃tɛn]) is a commune in the Oise department in northern France.

== History ==
Joan of Arc was imprisoned in the keep of Beaulieu-les-Fontaines in June 1430.

== Population ==
Historical population
Year	Pop.	±% p.a.
1968	527	—
1975	453	−2.14%
1982	459	+0.19%
1990	470	+0.30%
1999	505	+0.80%
2007	585	+1.86%
2012	597	+0.41%
2017	609	+0.40%
2023	563	−1.30%
Source: INSEE

== See also ==
- Communes of the Oise department
