= Lassigny =

- Commune
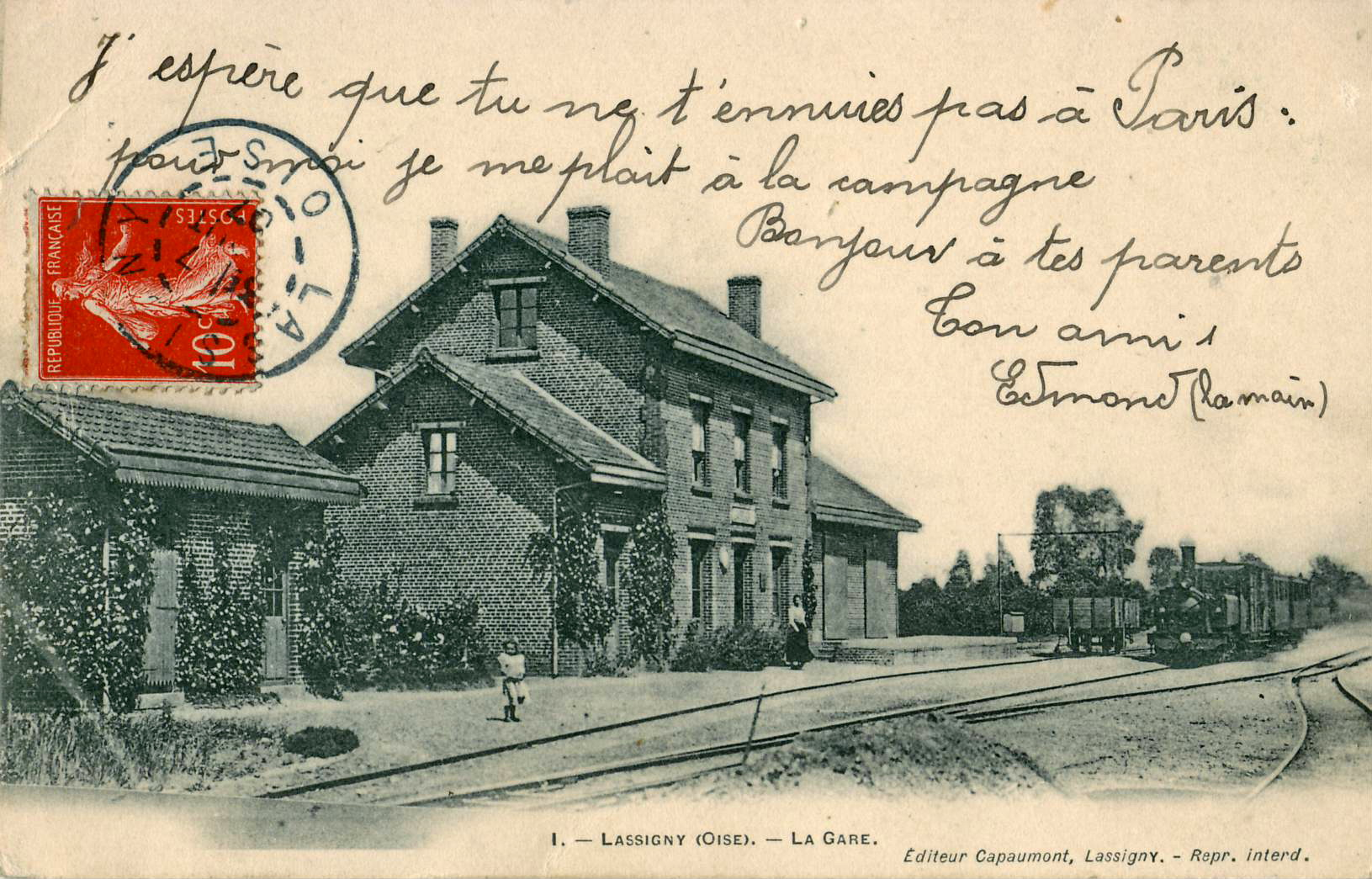
- The old railway station in Lassigny
- Location of Lassigny
- Location within France Location within Hauts-de-France
- Coordinates: 49°35′21″N 2°50′38″E
- Country: France
- Region: Hauts-de-France
- Department: Oise
- Arrondissement: Compiègne
- Canton: Thourotte
- Intercommunality: Pays des Sources

Government
  - Mayor (2020–2026): Laurent Marot
- Area^{1}: 16.65 km^{2} (6.43 sq mi)
- Elevation: 80 m (260 ft)
- Highest elevation: 130 m (430 ft)
- Lowest elevation: 53 m (174 ft)
- Population (2023): 1,469
  - Density: 88.23/km^{2} (228.5/sq mi)
- Time zone: UTC+01:00 (CET)
  - Summer (DST): UTC+02:00 (CEST)
- INSEE/Postal code: 60350 /60310
- ^{1} French Land Register data, which excludes lakes, ponds, glaciers > 1 km^{2} (0.386 sq mi or 247 acres) and river estuaries.

Lassigny (French pronunciation: [lasiɲi]) is a commune in the Oise department in northern France.

== See also ==
- Communes of the Oise department
