= Candor, Oise =

Candor
- Commune
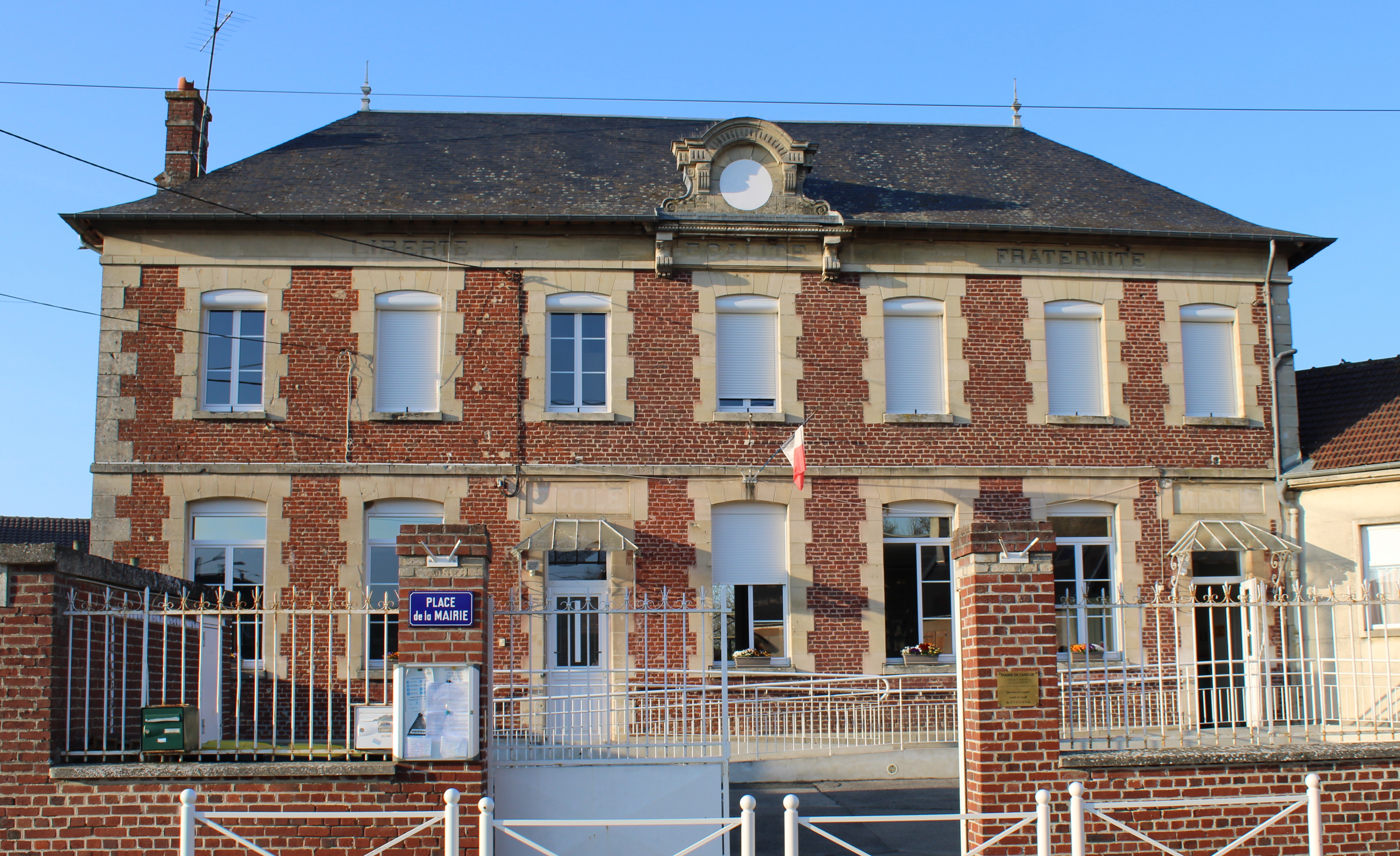
- Town hall

- Coat of arms
- Location of Candor
- Location within France Location within Hauts-de-France
- Coordinates: 49°37′43″N 2°53′46″E
- Country: France
- Region: Hauts-de-France
- Department: Oise
- Arrondissement: Compiègne
- Canton: Thourotte
- Intercommunality: Pays des Sources

Government
  - Mayor (2020–2026): Delphine Valois
- Area^{1}: 8.95 km^{2} (3.46 sq mi)
- Elevation: 73 m (240 ft)
- Highest elevation: 122 m (400 ft)
- Lowest elevation: 62 m (203 ft)
- Population (2023): 321
  - Density: 35.9/km^{2} (92.9/sq mi)
- Time zone: UTC+01:00 (CET)
  - Summer (DST): UTC+02:00 (CEST)
- INSEE/Postal code: 60124 /60310
- ^{1} French Land Register data, which excludes lakes, ponds, glaciers > 1 km^{2} (0.386 sq mi or 247 acres) and river estuaries.

Candor (French pronunciation: [kɑ̃dɔʁ]) is a commune in the Oise department in northern France.

== See also ==
- Communes of the Oise department
