= Thiescourt =

- Commune
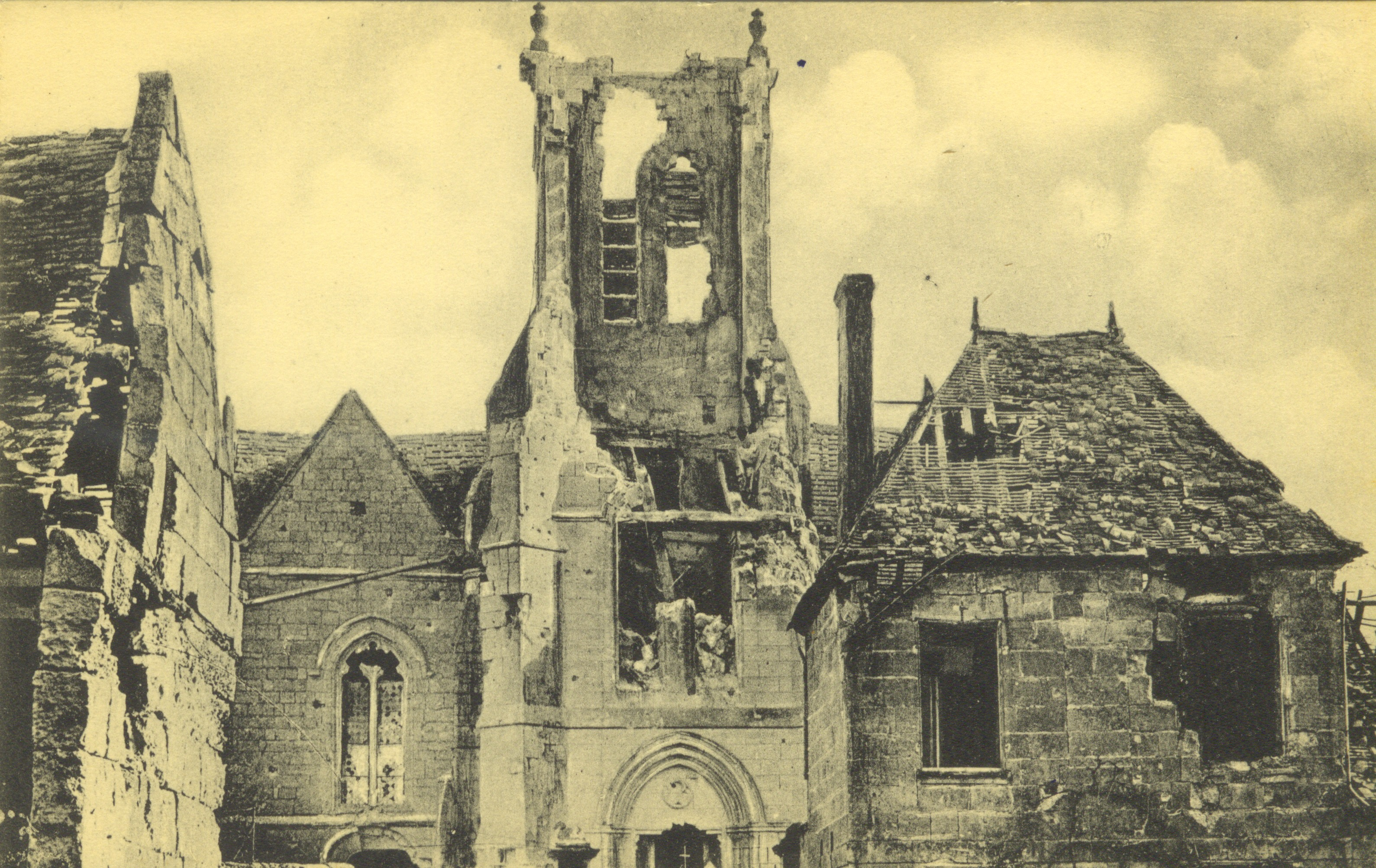
- Thiescourt after World War I
- Location of Thiescourt
- Location within France Location within Hauts-de-France
- Coordinates: 49°33′57″N 2°53′03″E
- Country: France
- Region: Hauts-de-France
- Department: Oise
- Arrondissement: Compiègne
- Canton: Thourotte
- Intercommunality: Pays des Sources

Government
  - Mayor (2020–2026): François Gomez
- Area^{1}: 13.03 km^{2} (5.03 sq mi)
- Elevation: 80 m (260 ft)
- Highest elevation: 183 m (600 ft)
- Lowest elevation: 47 m (154 ft)
- Population (2023): 750
  - Density: 58/km^{2} (150/sq mi)
- Time zone: UTC+01:00 (CET)
  - Summer (DST): UTC+02:00 (CEST)
- INSEE/Postal code: 60632 /60310
- ^{1} French Land Register data, which excludes lakes, ponds, glaciers > 1 km^{2} (0.386 sq mi or 247 acres) and river estuaries.

Thiescourt is a commune in the Oise department in northern France.

== See also ==
- Communes of the Oise department
