= Plessis-de-Roye =

- Commune
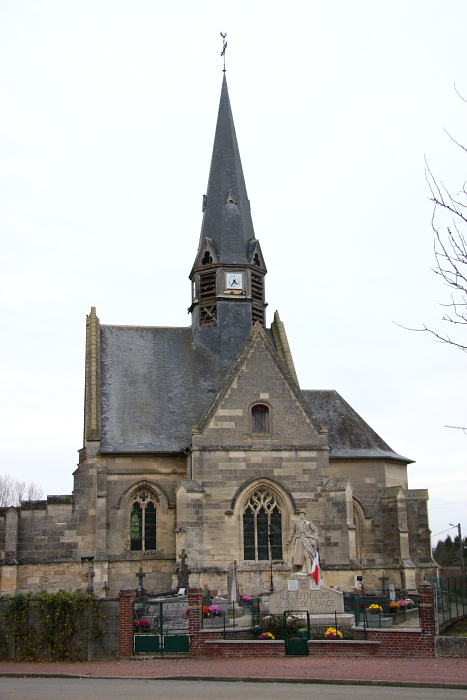
- The church in Plessis-de-Roye
- Location of Plessis-de-Roye
- Location within France Location within Hauts-de-France
- Coordinates: 49°34′44″N 2°49′56″E
- Country: France
- Region: Hauts-de-France
- Department: Oise
- Arrondissement: Compiègne
- Canton: Thourotte
- Intercommunality: Pays des Sources

Government
  - Mayor (2020–2026): Patrick Peyr
- Area^{1}: 6.2 km^{2} (2.4 sq mi)
- Elevation: 110 m (360 ft)
- Highest elevation: 180 m (590 ft)
- Lowest elevation: 72 m (236 ft)
- Population (2023): 245
  - Density: 40/km^{2} (100/sq mi)
- Time zone: UTC+01:00 (CET)
  - Summer (DST): UTC+02:00 (CEST)
- INSEE/Postal code: 60499 /60310
- ^{1} French Land Register data, which excludes lakes, ponds, glaciers > 1 km^{2} (0.386 sq mi or 247 acres) and river estuaries.

Plessis-de-Roye (French pronunciation: [plɛsi də ʁwa]) is a commune in the Oise department in northern France.

== See also ==
- Communes of the Oise department
