= Thourotte =

- Commune
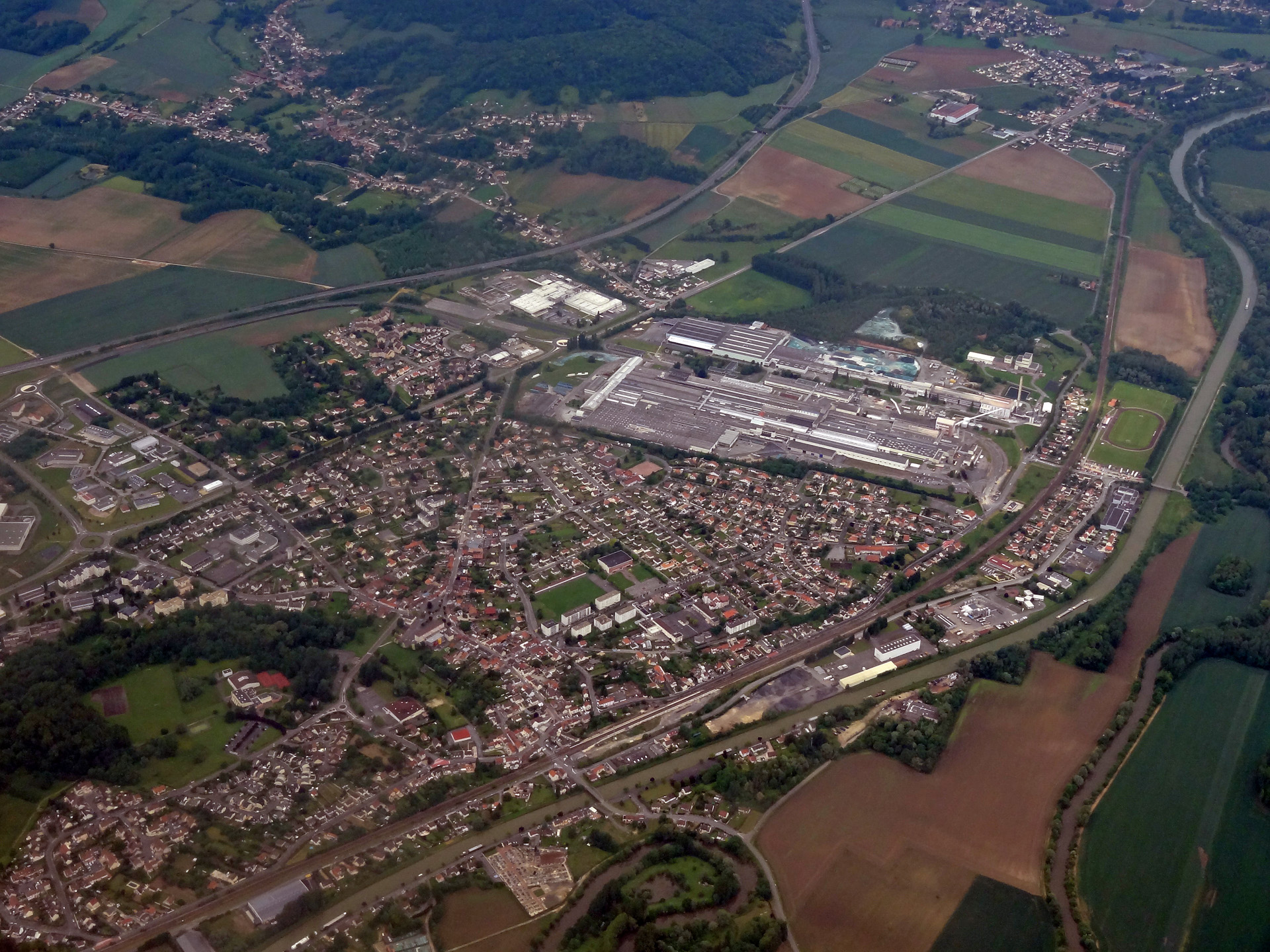
- An aerial view of Thourotte

- Coat of arms
- Location of Thourotte
- Location within France Location within Hauts-de-France
- Coordinates: 49°28′46″N 2°53′03″E
- Country: France
- Region: Hauts-de-France
- Department: Oise
- Arrondissement: Compiègne
- Canton: Thourotte
- Intercommunality: Deux Vallées

Government
  - Mayor (2020–2026): Patrice Carvalho
- Area^{1}: 4.38 km^{2} (1.69 sq mi)
- Highest elevation: 71 m (233 ft)
- Lowest elevation: 32 m (105 ft)
- Population (2023): 4,463
  - Density: 1,020/km^{2} (2,640/sq mi)
- Time zone: UTC+01:00 (CET)
  - Summer (DST): UTC+02:00 (CEST)
- INSEE/Postal code: 60636 /60150
- ^{1} French Land Register data, which excludes lakes, ponds, glaciers > 1 km^{2} (0.386 sq mi or 247 acres) and river estuaries.

Thourotte (French pronunciation: [tuʁɔt]) is a commune in the Oise department in northern France.

== Population ==
Historical population
Year	Pop.	±% p.a.
1968	3,155	—
1975	3,500	+1.49%
1982	4,922	+4.99%
1990	5,256	+0.82%
1999	5,239	−0.04%
2007	4,798	−1.09%
2012	4,645	−0.65%
2017	4,558	−0.38%
2023	4,463	−0.35%
Source: INSEE

== See also ==
- Communes of the Oise department
