= Gury, Oise =

Gury
- Commune
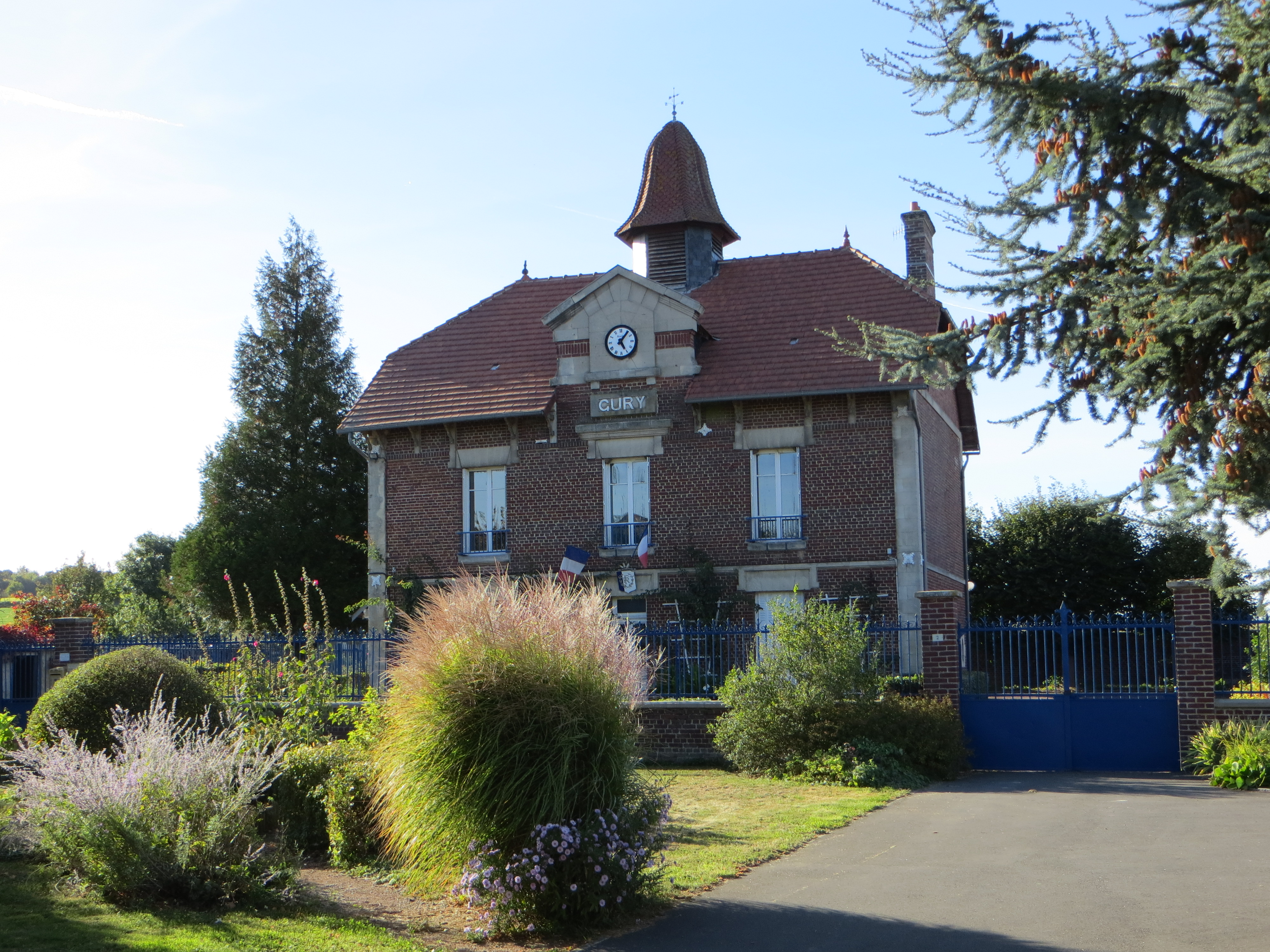
- Town hall
- Location of Gury
- Location within France Location within Hauts-de-France
- Coordinates: 49°34′15″N 2°48′05″E
- Country: France
- Region: Hauts-de-France
- Department: Oise
- Arrondissement: Compiègne
- Canton: Thourotte
- Intercommunality: Pays des Sources

Government
  - Mayor (2020–2026): Sandrine Pillot
- Area^{1}: 5.01 km^{2} (1.93 sq mi)
- Elevation: 100 m (330 ft)
- Highest elevation: 183 m (600 ft)
- Lowest elevation: 83 m (272 ft)
- Population (2023): 232
  - Density: 46.3/km^{2} (120/sq mi)
- Time zone: UTC+01:00 (CET)
  - Summer (DST): UTC+02:00 (CEST)
- INSEE/Postal code: 60292 /60310
- ^{1} French Land Register data, which excludes lakes, ponds, glaciers > 1 km^{2} (0.386 sq mi or 247 acres) and river estuaries.

Gury (French pronunciation: [ɡyʁi]) is a commune in the Oise department in northern France.

== See also ==
- Communes of the Oise department
