= Saint-Léger-aux-Bois, Oise =

Saint-Léger-aux-Bois
- Commune
- Location of Saint-Léger-aux-Bois
- Location within France Location within Hauts-de-France
- Coordinates: 49°28′47″N 2°57′10″E
- Country: France
- Region: Hauts-de-France
- Department: Oise
- Arrondissement: Compiègne
- Canton: Thourotte
- Intercommunality: Deux Vallées

Government
  - Mayor (2024–2026): Sylvain Bertrand
- Area^{1}: 8.3 km^{2} (3.2 sq mi)
- Elevation: 50 m (160 ft)
- Highest elevation: 52 m (171 ft)
- Lowest elevation: 33 m (108 ft)
- Population (2023): 735
  - Density: 89/km^{2} (230/sq mi)
- Time zone: UTC+01:00 (CET)
  - Summer (DST): UTC+02:00 (CEST)
- INSEE/Postal code: 60582 /60170
- ^{1} French Land Register data, which excludes lakes, ponds, glaciers > 1 km^{2} (0.386 sq mi or 247 acres) and river estuaries.

Saint-Léger-aux-Bois (French pronunciation: [sɛ̃ leʒe o bwa]) is a commune in the Oise department in northern France.

== See also ==
- Communes of the Oise department
