= Varesnes =

- Commune
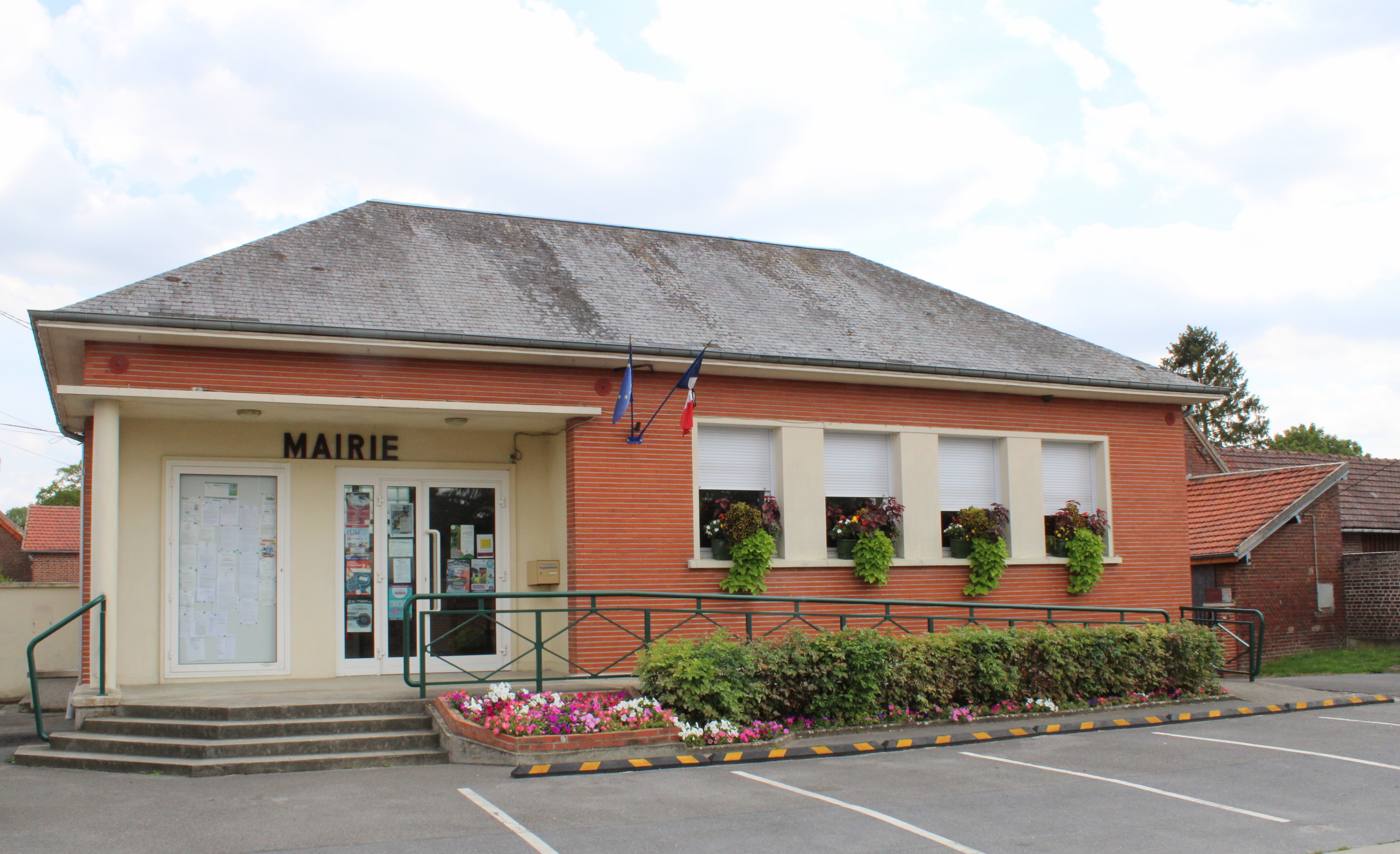
- Town hall
- Location of Varesnes
- Location within France Location within Hauts-de-France
- Coordinates: 49°33′50″N 3°03′37″E
- Country: France
- Region: Hauts-de-France
- Department: Oise
- Arrondissement: Compiègne
- Canton: Noyon
- Intercommunality: Pays Noyonnais

Government
  - Mayor (2020–2026): Philippe Basset
- Area^{1}: 9.15 km^{2} (3.53 sq mi)
- Elevation: 39 m (128 ft)
- Highest elevation: 57 m (187 ft)
- Lowest elevation: 36 m (118 ft)
- Population (2023): 367
  - Density: 40.1/km^{2} (104/sq mi)
- Time zone: UTC+01:00 (CET)
  - Summer (DST): UTC+02:00 (CEST)
- INSEE/Postal code: 60655 /60400
- ^{1} French Land Register data, which excludes lakes, ponds, glaciers > 1 km^{2} (0.386 sq mi or 247 acres) and river estuaries.

Varesnes (French pronunciation: [vaʁɛn]) is a commune in the Oise department in northern France.

== See also ==
- Communes of the Oise department
