= Margny-aux-Cerises =

- Commune
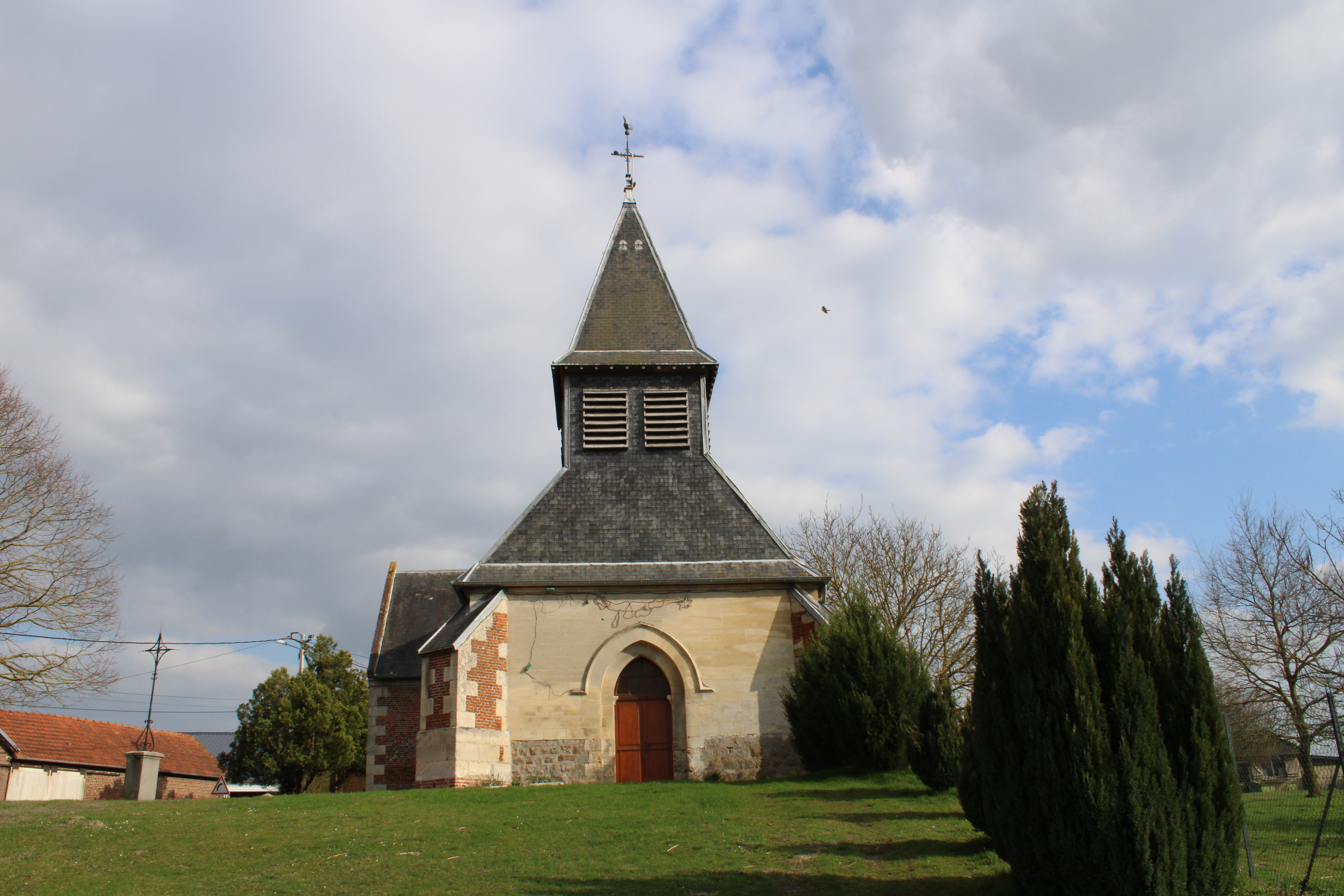
- The church in Margny-aux-Cerises
- Location of Margny-aux-Cerises
- Location within France Location within Hauts-de-France
- Coordinates: 49°40′30″N 2°52′05″E
- Country: France
- Region: Hauts-de-France
- Department: Oise
- Arrondissement: Compiègne
- Canton: Thourotte
- Intercommunality: Pays des Sources

Government
  - Mayor (2020–2026): Gauthier Nancelle
- Area^{1}: 4.55 km^{2} (1.76 sq mi)
- Elevation: 86 m (282 ft)
- Highest elevation: 97 m (318 ft)
- Lowest elevation: 75 m (246 ft)
- Population (2023): 258
  - Density: 56.7/km^{2} (147/sq mi)
- Time zone: UTC+01:00 (CET)
  - Summer (DST): UTC+02:00 (CEST)
- INSEE/Postal code: 60381 /60310
- ^{1} French Land Register data, which excludes lakes, ponds, glaciers > 1 km^{2} (0.386 sq mi or 247 acres) and river estuaries.

Margny-aux-Cerises (French pronunciation: [maʁɲi o səʁiz]) is a commune in the Oise department in northern France.

== See also ==
- Communes of the Oise department
