= Roye-sur-Matz =

- Commune
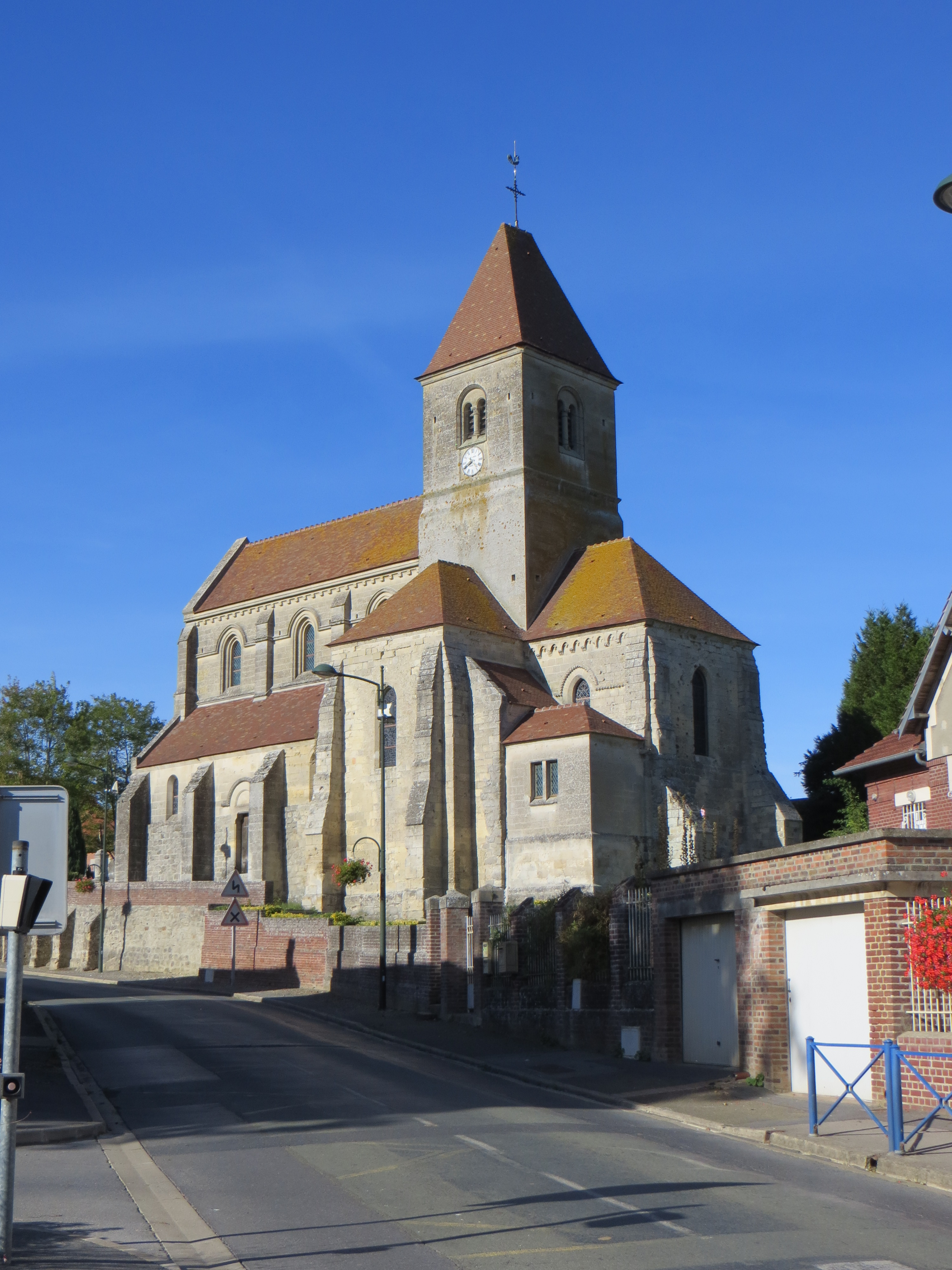
- The church in Roye-sur-Matz
- Location of Roye-sur-Matz
- Location within France Location within Hauts-de-France
- Coordinates: 49°35′33″N 2°46′34″E
- Country: France
- Region: Hauts-de-France
- Department: Oise
- Arrondissement: Compiègne
- Canton: Thourotte
- Intercommunality: Pays des Sources

Government
  - Mayor (2020–2026): François Fillon
- Area^{1}: 10.75 km^{2} (4.15 sq mi)
- Elevation: 70 m (230 ft)
- Highest elevation: 144 m (472 ft)
- Lowest elevation: 63 m (207 ft)
- Population (2023): 448
  - Density: 41.7/km^{2} (108/sq mi)
- Time zone: UTC+01:00 (CET)
  - Summer (DST): UTC+02:00 (CEST)
- INSEE/Postal code: 60558 /60310
- ^{1} French Land Register data, which excludes lakes, ponds, glaciers > 1 km^{2} (0.386 sq mi or 247 acres) and river estuaries.

Roye-sur-Matz (French pronunciation: [ʁwa syʁ ma]) is a commune in the Oise department in northern France.

== See also ==
- Communes of the Oise department
