= Canny-sur-Matz =

- Commune
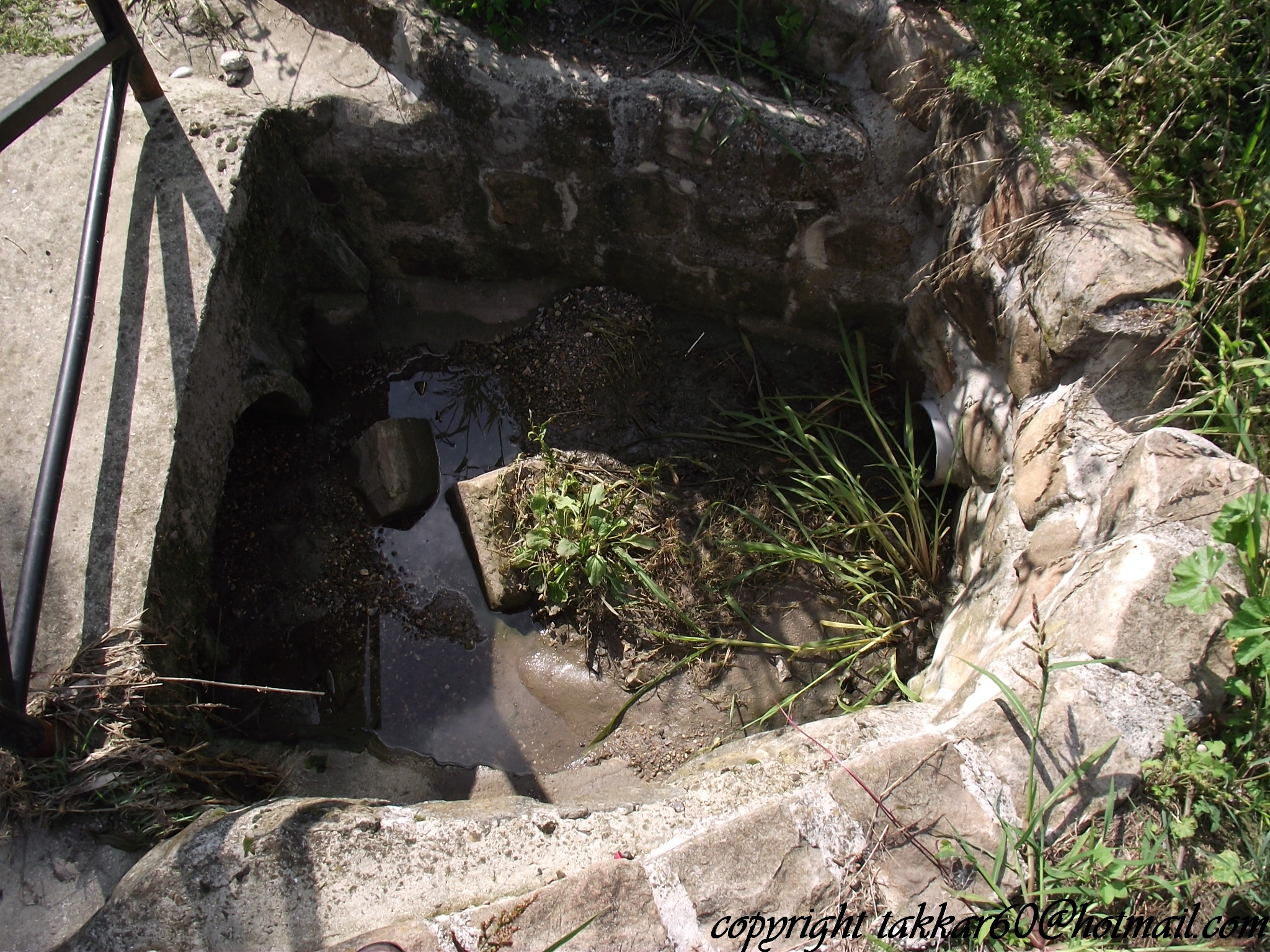
- The source of the Matz in Canny-sur-Matz

- Coat of arms
- Location of Canny-sur-Matz
- Location within France Location within Hauts-de-France
- Coordinates: 49°36′07″N 2°48′01″E
- Country: France
- Region: Hauts-de-France
- Department: Oise
- Arrondissement: Compiègne
- Canton: Thourotte
- Intercommunality: Pays des Sources

Government
  - Mayor (2020–2026): Philippe Delachambre
- Area^{1}: 6.89 km^{2} (2.66 sq mi)
- Elevation: 80 m (260 ft)
- Highest elevation: 94 m (308 ft)
- Lowest elevation: 68 m (223 ft)
- Population (2023): 415
  - Density: 60.2/km^{2} (156/sq mi)
- Time zone: UTC+01:00 (CET)
  - Summer (DST): UTC+02:00 (CEST)
- INSEE/Postal code: 60127 /60310
- ^{1} French Land Register data, which excludes lakes, ponds, glaciers > 1 km^{2} (0.386 sq mi or 247 acres) and river estuaries.

Canny-sur-Matz (French pronunciation: [kani syʁ ma]) is a commune in the Oise department in northern France.

== See also ==
- Communes of the Oise department
