= Marest-sur-Matz =

- Commune
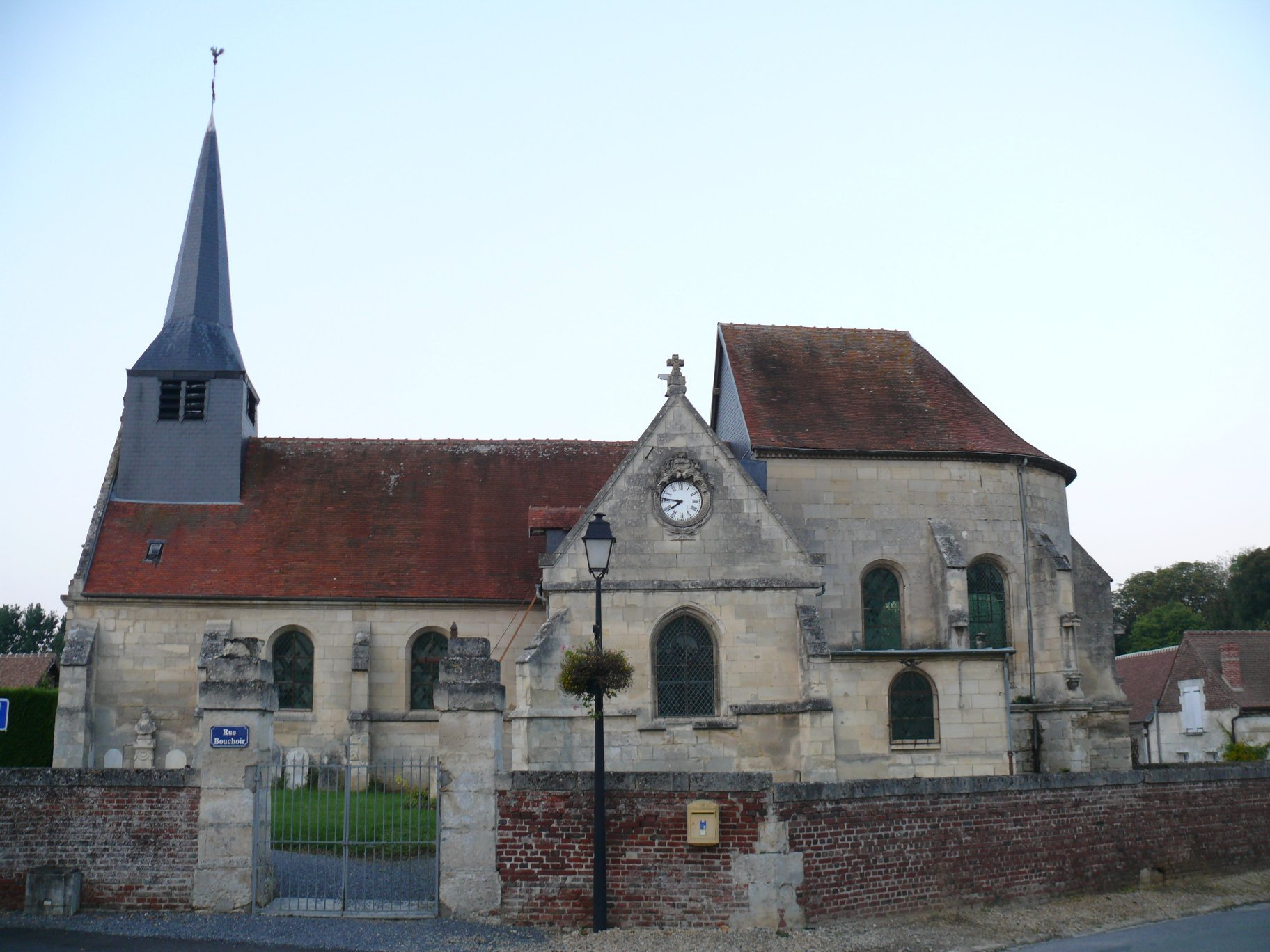
- The church in Marest-sur-Matz

- Coat of arms
- Location of Marest-sur-Matz
- Location within France Location within Hauts-de-France
- Coordinates: 49°30′34″N 2°49′30″E
- Country: France
- Region: Hauts-de-France
- Department: Oise
- Arrondissement: Compiègne
- Canton: Thourotte
- Intercommunality: Deux Vallées

Government
  - Mayor (2020–2026): Christian Lepine
- Area^{1}: 3.25 km^{2} (1.25 sq mi)
- Elevation: 50 m (160 ft)
- Highest elevation: 131 m (430 ft)
- Lowest elevation: 36 m (118 ft)
- Population (2023): 375
  - Density: 115/km^{2} (299/sq mi)
- Time zone: UTC+01:00 (CET)
  - Summer (DST): UTC+02:00 (CEST)
- INSEE/Postal code: 60378 /60490
- ^{1} French Land Register data, which excludes lakes, ponds, glaciers > 1 km^{2} (0.386 sq mi or 247 acres) and river estuaries.

Marest-sur-Matz is a commune in the Oise department in northern France.

== See also ==
- Communes of the Oise department
