= Ribécourt-Dreslincourt =

- Commune
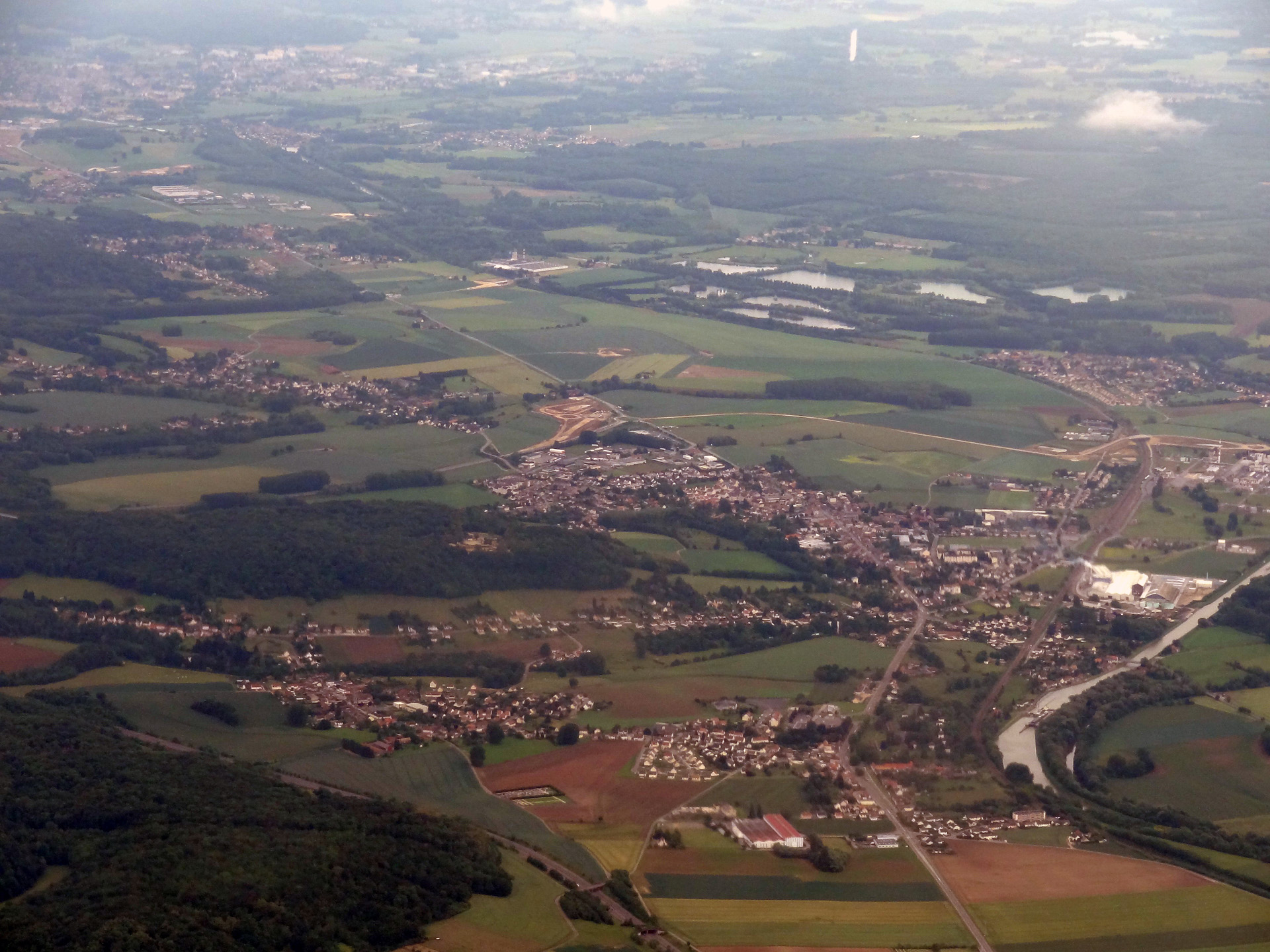
- An aerial view of Ribécourt-Dreslincourt

- Coat of arms
- Location of Ribécourt-Dreslincourt
- Location within France Location within Hauts-de-France
- Coordinates: 49°30′39″N 2°55′24″E
- Country: France
- Region: Hauts-de-France
- Department: Oise
- Arrondissement: Compiègne
- Canton: Thourotte
- Intercommunality: Deux Vallées

Government
  - Mayor (2020–2026): Jean-Guy Létoffé
- Area^{1}: 12.98 km^{2} (5.01 sq mi)
- Highest elevation: 187 m (614 ft)
- Lowest elevation: 33 m (108 ft)
- Population (2023): 3,871
  - Density: 298.2/km^{2} (772.4/sq mi)
- Time zone: UTC+01:00 (CET)
  - Summer (DST): UTC+02:00 (CEST)
- INSEE/Postal code: 60537 /60170
- ^{1} French Land Register data, which excludes lakes, ponds, glaciers > 1 km^{2} (0.386 sq mi or 247 acres) and river estuaries.

Ribécourt-Dreslincourt (French pronunciation: [ʁibekuʁ dʁɛlɛ̃kuʁ]) is a commune in the Oise department in northern France. It was created in 1973 by the merger of two former communes: Ribécourt and Dreslincourt.

== Population ==
Population data refer to the area corresponding with the commune as of January 2025.

Historical population
Year	Pop.	±% p.a.
1968	2,754	—
1975	3,771	+4.59%
1982	3,466	−1.20%
1990	3,706	+0.84%
1999	3,952	+0.72%
2007	3,912	−0.13%
2012	3,900	−0.06%
2017	3,748	−0.79%
2023	3,871	+0.54%
Source: INSEE

== See also ==
- Communes of the Oise department
