= Hallsville =

Hallsville may refer to:

- Hallsville, New South Wales, Australia

== United States ==
- Hallsville, Illinois
- Hallsville, Missouri
- Hallsville, New York
- Hallsville, Ohio
- Hallsville, Texas
- Hallsville, North Carolina

== See also ==
- Hallsville High School (disambiguation)
- Halls (disambiguation)
- Ville (disambiguation)
- Halltown (disambiguation)
- Halton (disambiguation)
- Hallville (disambiguation)
