= Libermont =

- Commune
- Location of Libermont
- Location within France Location within Hauts-de-France
- Coordinates: 49°41′41″N 2°58′17″E
- Country: France
- Region: Hauts-de-France
- Department: Oise
- Arrondissement: Compiègne
- Canton: Noyon
- Intercommunality: Pays Noyonnais

Government
  - Mayor (2020–2026): Julien Desachy
- Area^{1}: 11.37 km^{2} (4.39 sq mi)
- Elevation: 75 m (246 ft)
- Highest elevation: 101 m (331 ft)
- Lowest elevation: 62 m (203 ft)
- Population (2023): 181
  - Density: 15.9/km^{2} (41.2/sq mi)
- Time zone: UTC+01:00 (CET)
  - Summer (DST): UTC+02:00 (CEST)
- INSEE/Postal code: 60362 /60640
- ^{1} French Land Register data, which excludes lakes, ponds, glaciers > 1 km^{2} (0.386 sq mi or 247 acres) and river estuaries.

Libermont (French pronunciation: [libɛʁmɔ̃]) is a French commune, located in the department of Oise in the region of Hauts-de-France. It belongs to the Canton of Noyon (before 2015: Canton of Guiscard) and is part of the commune-association Pays Noyonnais.

== Geography ==
Libermont lies 33 kilometres (21 mi) north-by-northeast of Compiègne on the Canal du Nord. Neighbouring communes surrounding Libermont are Ercheu to the north and west, Grécourt to the north, Esmery-Hallon to the east and northeast, Fréniches to the east and southeast, and Frétoy-le-Château to the south.

== Population ==
Historical population
Year	Pop.	±% p.a.
1968	161	—
1975	155	−0.54%
1982	155	+0.00%
1990	166	+0.86%
1999	187	+1.33%
2007	202	+0.97%
2012	213	+1.07%
2017	182	−3.10%
2023	181	−0.09%
Source: INSEE

== See also ==
- Communes of the Oise department
