= Halltown =

Halltown may refer to:

- Halltown, Alabama, USA
- Halltown, Missouri, USA
- Halltown, West Virginia, USA

== See also ==
- Town (disambiguation)
- Hall (disambiguation)
- Hal (disambiguation)
- Halle (disambiguation)
- Halton (disambiguation)
- Hallville (disambiguation)
