= Maucourt =

Maucourt is the name or part of the name of the following communes in France:

- Maucourt, Oise, in the Oise department
- Maucourt, Somme, in the Somme department
- Maucourt-sur-Orne, in the Meuse department
