= Berlancourt =

Berlancourt may refer to the following places in France:

- Berlancourt, Aisne, a commune in the department of Aisne
- Berlancourt, Oise, a commune in the department of Oise
