= Cantigny (disambiguation) =

Cantigny is a park in Wheaton, Illinois, U.S.

Cantigny may also refer to:

- Cantigny, Somme, a commune in the Somme department in Hauts-de-France in France
  - Battle of Cantigny, in World War I
- USAT Cantigny, a U.S. Army Transport ship launched in 1919, later known as Arosa Kulm

== See also ==
- Cartigny (disambiguation)
- Catigny, Oise department, France
