= Deville =

Deville, DeVille, De Ville, or de Vil may refer to:

== Automobiles ==
- Cadillac DeVille, model of automobile produced between 1949 and 2005 in the United States by General Motors
- Coupé de Ville, European term for the "town car" body style
- Panther De Ville, model of automobile produced between 1974 and 1985 in the United Kingdom by Panther Westwinds
- Statesman de Ville, model of automobile produced between 1971 and 1984 in Australia by General Motors

== People ==
- Abigail DeVille,
- Brandon Deville,
- C.C. DeVille (born 1962), lead guitarist for American glam metal band Poison
- Céline Deville,
- Charles Joseph Sainte-Claire Deville (1814–1876), French geologist
- Cristian Deville,
- Cruella de Ville, 1980s punk rock band
- Édouard-Gaston Deville (1849–1924), French inventor, surveyor, astronomer
- Émile Deville,
- Frank Deville,
- Gabriel Deville (1854–1940), French politician
- Henri Étienne Sainte-Claire Deville (1818–1881), French chemist
- James De Ville (1777–1846), British phrenologist
- Julia deVille,
- Maurice Deville,
- Michel Deville (1931–2023), French film director
- Patrick Deville,
- Philippe DeVille (born 1944), Belgian economist
- Rik Devillé (born 1944), Belgian Catholic priest
- Scoop DeVille,
- Sonya Deville,
- Stephanie Devillé,
- Toots Deville,
- Willy DeVille, musician
  - Mink DeVille, rock band led by Willy DeVille
- Winston De Ville (1937–2025), American historian

== Fictional characters ==
- Cruella de Vil, the main villainess from the book The Hundred and One Dalmatians and movie One Hundred and One Dalmatians
- Betty DeVille, Howard DeVille, Phil and Lil DeVille, from the Nickelodeon TV series Rugrats and All Grown Up!
- Count de Ville is a title used by the vampire Dracula in the novel of the same name.

== Places ==
- Deville, Ardennes, commune of the Ardennes in France
- Deville, Louisiana, census-designated place in the United States

== Other uses ==
- Jaxson de Ville, American football mascot
- Kip Deville, thoroughbred race horse who won the 2007 Breeders' Cup Mile

== See also ==
- Ville (disambiguation)
