= Haltom =

Haltom may refer to:

- Haltom City, Texas, United States
  - Haltom High School in the city
- Elbert Bertram Haltom Jr. (1922–2003), a district judge in Alabama, United States

== See also ==
- Halton (disambiguation)
