= The Devilles =

The Devilles may refer to:

- The Box Tops
- The DeVilles (New York band)

== See also ==
- Deville (disambiguation)
