= Canton of Noyon =

Canton of France

Coordinates: 49.58°N 3.00°E

- Canton
- Situation of the canton of Noyon in the department of Oise
- Country: France
- Region: Hauts-de-France
- Department: Oise
- No. of communes: {{{nbcomm}}}
- Population (2023): 31,901
- INSEE code: 6017

The canton of Noyon is an administrative division of the Oise department, northern France. Its borders were modified at the French canton reorganisation which came into effect in March 2015. Its seat is in Noyon.

It consists of the following communes:

1. Appilly
2. Babœuf
3. Beaugies-sous-Bois
4. Beaurains-lès-Noyon
5. Béhéricourt
6. Berlancourt
7. Brétigny
8. Bussy
9. Caisnes
10. Campagne
11. Carlepont
12. Catigny
13. Crisolles
14. Cuts
15. Flavy-le-Meldeux
16. Fréniches
17. Frétoy-le-Château
18. Genvry
19. Golancourt
20. Grandrû
21. Guiscard
22. Larbroye
23. Libermont
24. Maucourt
25. Mondescourt
26. Morlincourt
27. Muirancourt
28. Noyon
29. Passel
30. Le Plessis-Patte-d'Oie
31. Pont-l'Évêque
32. Pontoise-lès-Noyon
33. Porquéricourt
34. Quesmy
35. Salency
36. Sempigny
37. Sermaize
38. Suzoy
39. Varesnes
40. Vauchelles
41. Ville
42. Villeselve
