= Muirancourt =

- Commune
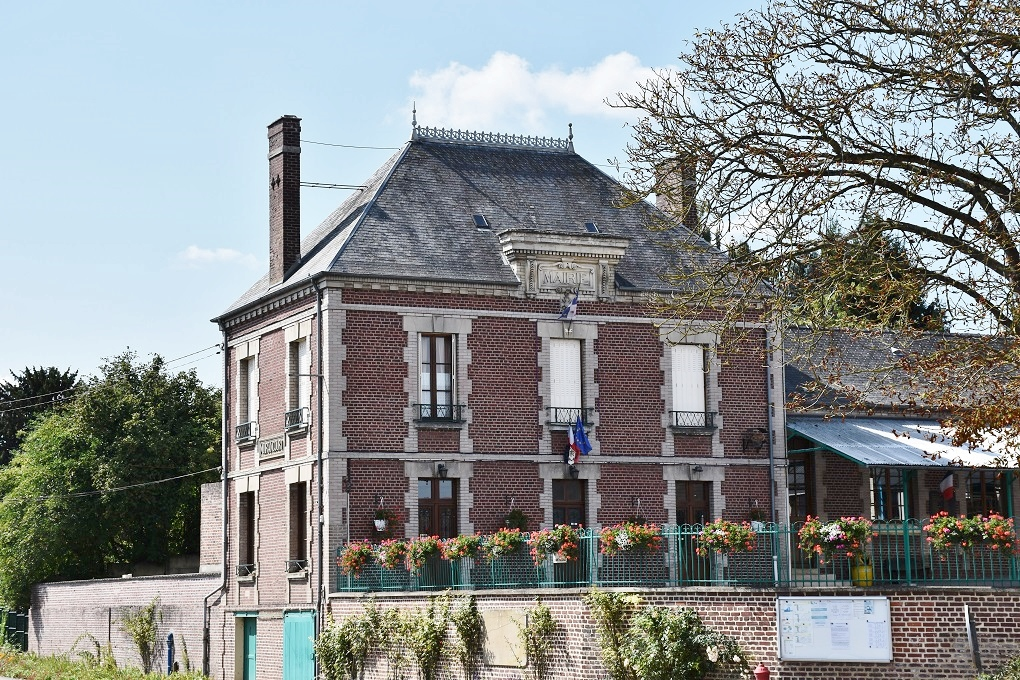
- The town hall in Muirancourt

- Coat of arms
- Location of Muirancourt
- Location within France Location within Hauts-de-France
- Coordinates: 49°38′40″N 3°00′31″E
- Country: France
- Region: Hauts-de-France
- Department: Oise
- Arrondissement: Compiègne
- Canton: Noyon
- Intercommunality: Pays Noyonnais

Government
  - Mayor (2024–2026): Régis Protasiuk
- Area^{1}: 5.68 km^{2} (2.19 sq mi)
- Elevation: 56 m (184 ft)
- Highest elevation: 106 m (348 ft)
- Lowest elevation: 48 m (157 ft)
- Population (2023): 587
  - Density: 103/km^{2} (268/sq mi)
- Time zone: UTC+01:00 (CET)
  - Summer (DST): UTC+02:00 (CEST)
- INSEE/Postal code: 60443 /60640
- ^{1} French Land Register data, which excludes lakes, ponds, glaciers > 1 km^{2} (0.386 sq mi or 247 acres) and river estuaries.

Muirancourt (French pronunciation: [mɥiʁɑ̃kuʁ]) is a commune in the Oise department in northern France.

== See also ==
- Communes of the Oise department
