= Halton (surname) =

Halton is a surname. Notable people with the surname include:

- Albert Halton (1893–1971), English soldier, recipient of the Victoria Cross
- Anthony Halton, a fictional character in 1937 film Angel
- Brian Halton (1941–2019), New Zealand organic chemist
- Charles Halton (1876–1959), American film actor
- Charles Halton (public servant) (1932–2013), Australian public servant
- David Halton (born 1940), Canadian reporter of CBC News
- Gracen Halton (born 2004), American football player
- Immanuel Halton (1628–1699), English astronomer and mathematician
- Jane Halton (born 1960), Australian public servant
- John de Halton also called John de Halghton (died 1324), English priest, Bishop of Carlisle 1292–1324
- John Halton (1491–1527/1530), English Member of Parliament
- Kathleen Tynan, née Halton (1937–1995), Canadian-British journalist, author and screenwriter
- Mary Halton (1878–1948), American physician and early IUD researcher.
- Matthew Halton (1904–1956), Canadian television journalist
- P. W. Halton (1841–1909), Irish-born conductor and music director of D'Oyly Carte Opera Company
- Paul Halton, Royal Navy admiral
- Reg Halton (1916–1988), English footballer
- Sean Halton (born 1987), American professional baseball player
- Timothy Halton (1632?–1704), English churchman and academic
