= Morlincourt =

- Commune
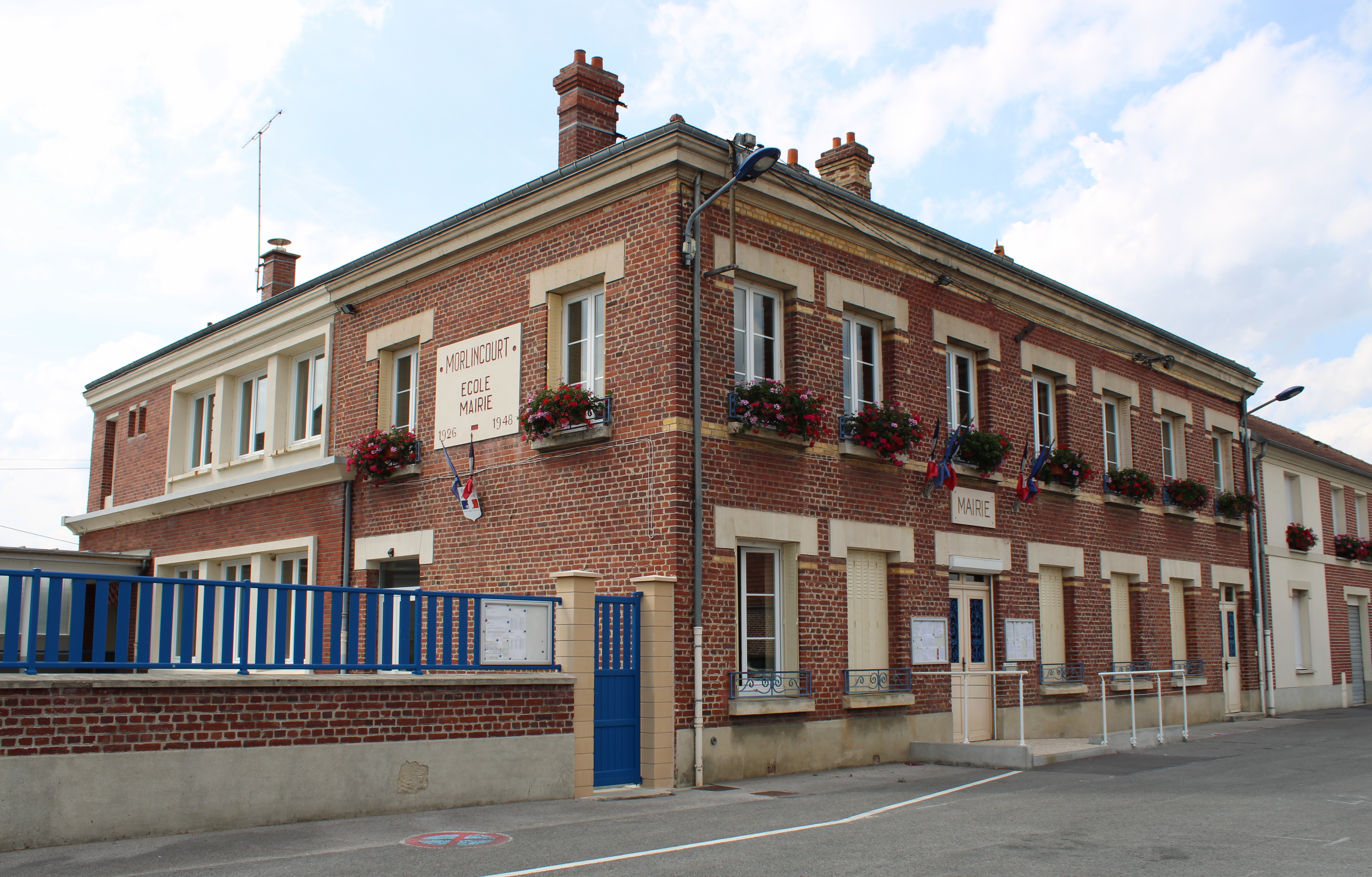
- Morlincourt Town hall
- Location of Morlincourt
- Location within France Location within Hauts-de-France
- Coordinates: 49°34′14″N 3°02′14″E
- Country: France
- Region: Hauts-de-France
- Department: Oise
- Arrondissement: Compiègne
- Canton: Noyon
- Intercommunality: Pays Noyonnais

Government
  - Mayor (2023–2026): Marc Degauchy
- Area^{1}: 3.42 km^{2} (1.32 sq mi)
- Elevation: 50 m (160 ft)
- Highest elevation: 57 m (187 ft)
- Lowest elevation: 36 m (118 ft)
- Population (2023): 500
  - Density: 150/km^{2} (380/sq mi)
- Time zone: UTC+01:00 (CET)
  - Summer (DST): UTC+02:00 (CEST)
- INSEE/Postal code: 60431 /60400
- ^{1} French Land Register data, which excludes lakes, ponds, glaciers > 1 km^{2} (0.386 sq mi or 247 acres) and river estuaries.

Morlincourt (French pronunciation: [mɔʁlɛ̃kuʁ]) is a commune in the Oise department in northern France.

== See also ==
- Communes of the Oise department
