= Crisolles =

- Commune
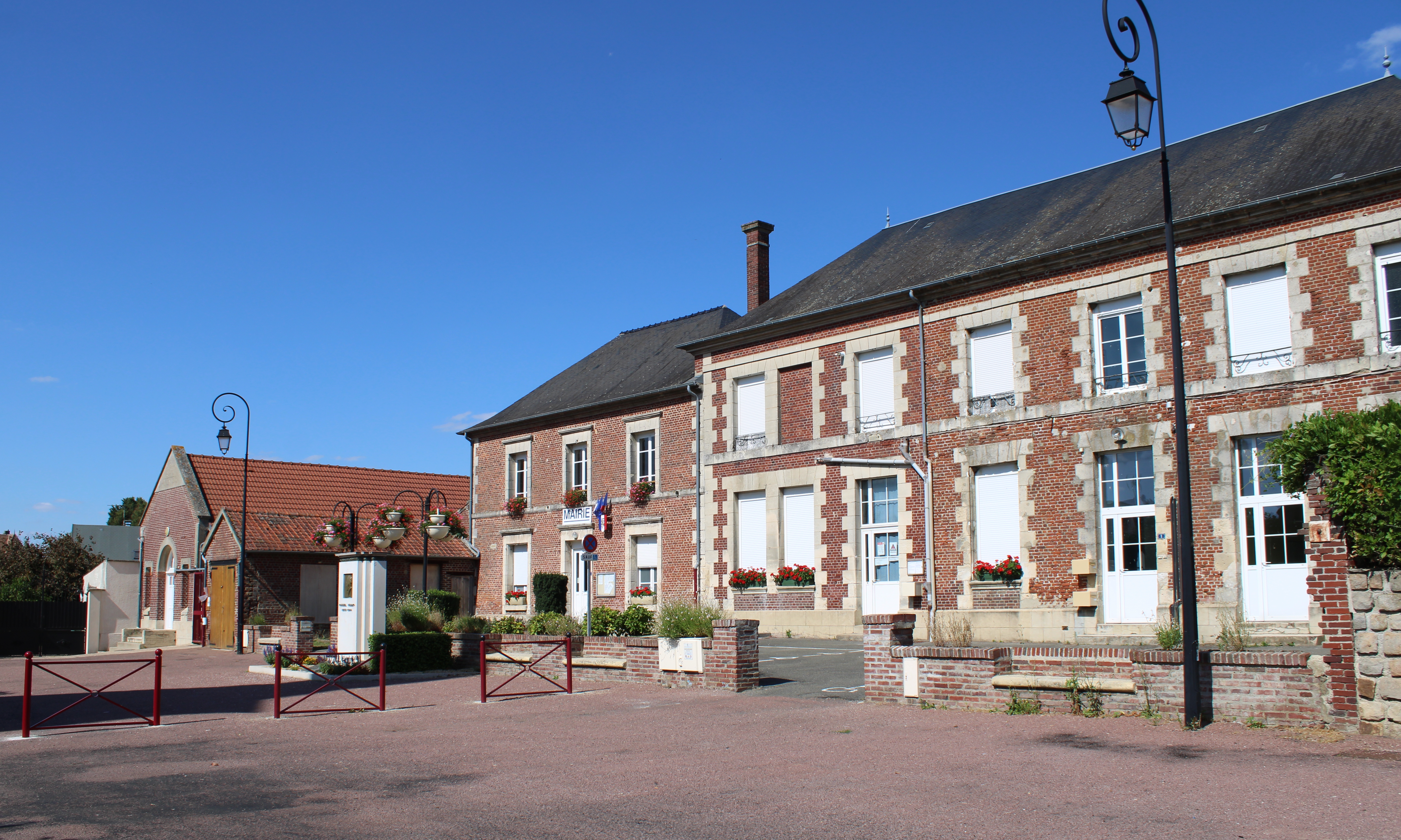
- The Town hall of Crisolles
- Location of Crisolles
- Location within France Location within Hauts-de-France
- Coordinates: 49°37′20″N 3°01′01″E
- Country: France
- Region: Hauts-de-France
- Department: Oise
- Arrondissement: Compiègne
- Canton: Noyon
- Intercommunality: Pays Noyonnais

Government
  - Mayor (2020–2026): Gérard Delanef
- Area^{1}: 10.54 km^{2} (4.07 sq mi)
- Elevation: 101 m (331 ft)
- Highest elevation: 181 m (594 ft)
- Lowest elevation: 48 m (157 ft)
- Population (2023): 917
  - Density: 87.0/km^{2} (225/sq mi)
- Time zone: UTC+01:00 (CET)
  - Summer (DST): UTC+02:00 (CEST)
- INSEE/Postal code: 60181 /60400
- ^{1} French Land Register data, which excludes lakes, ponds, glaciers > 1 km^{2} (0.386 sq mi or 247 acres) and river estuaries.

Crisolles (French pronunciation: [kʁizɔl]) is a commune in the Oise department in northern France.

== See also ==
- Communes of the Oise department
