= Ercheu =

- Commune
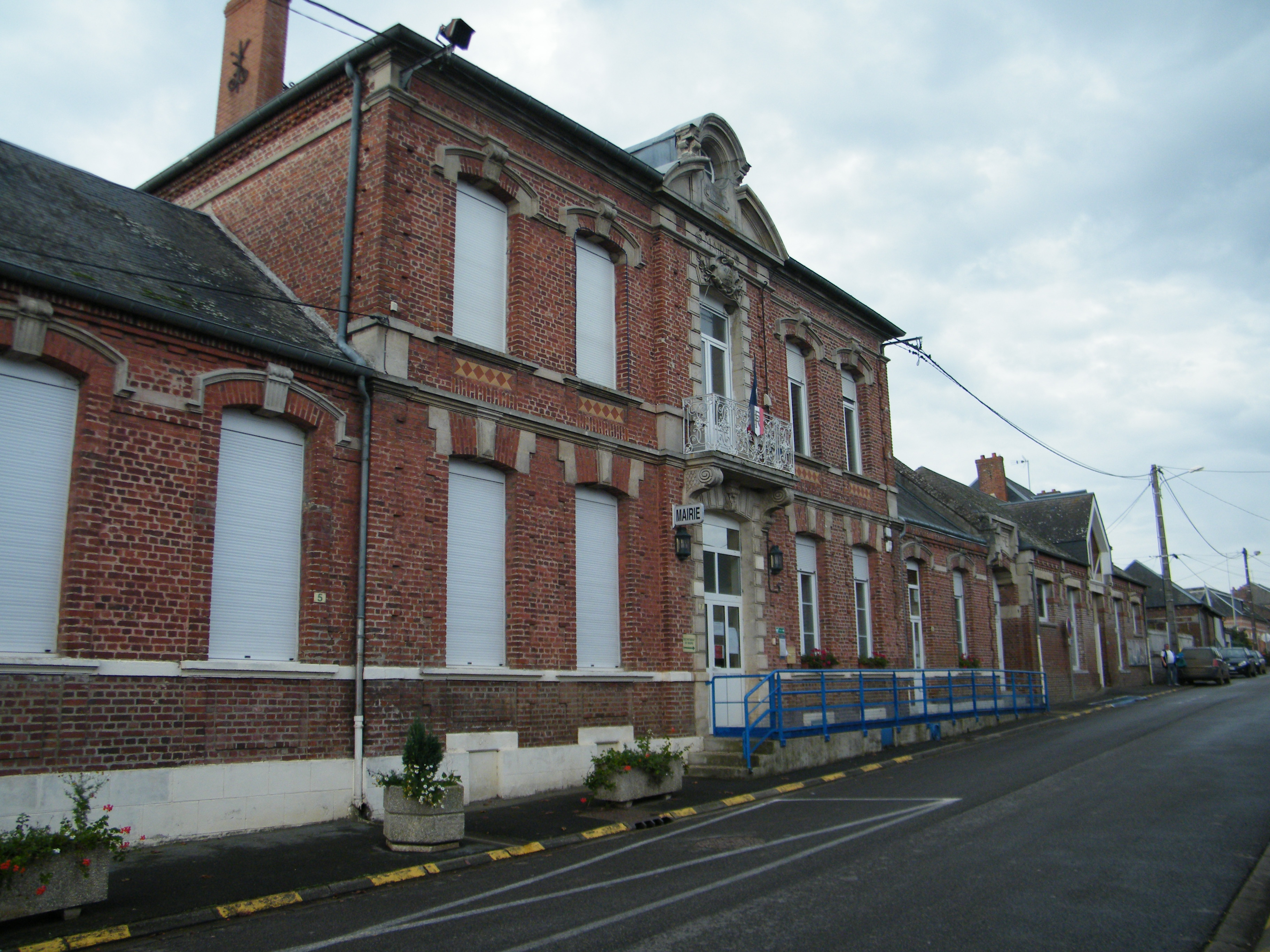
- Town hall
- Location of Ercheu
- Location within France Location within Hauts-de-France
- Coordinates: 49°42′06″N 2°56′32″E
- Country: France
- Region: Hauts-de-France
- Department: Somme
- Arrondissement: Montdidier
- Canton: Roye
- Intercommunality: CC Grand Roye

Government
  - Mayor (2020–2026): François Lamaire
- Area^{1}: 14.15 km^{2} (5.46 sq mi)
- Elevation: 70 m (230 ft)
- Highest elevation: 95 m (312 ft)
- Lowest elevation: 58 m (190 ft)
- Population (2023): 751
  - Density: 53.1/km^{2} (137/sq mi)
- Time zone: UTC+01:00 (CET)
  - Summer (DST): UTC+02:00 (CEST)
- INSEE/Postal code: 80279 /80400
- ^{1} French Land Register data, which excludes lakes, ponds, glaciers > 1 km^{2} (0.386 sq mi or 247 acres) and river estuaries.

Ercheu (French pronunciation: [ɛʁʃø]; Picard: Èrchu ) is a commune in the Somme department in Hauts-de-France in northern France.

== Etymology of the place name ==
Diverting from the Latin word " Arx-Arcis ", strengthened place:

 988 : Arceium 
1048 : Archeium
1150 : Erceium
1170 : Erchive
1237 : Herciaus
1248 : Erchieu
1633 : Erchu
1705 : Archeu
1764 : Ercheu

The name of the municipality is unchanged since 1764.

== Geography ==
Ercheu lies on the D15 and D168 junction, and is around 7.5 kilometres (5 mi) south of Nesle and 13 kilometres (8 mi) east of Roye, stretching from the Canal du Nord to the Petit Ingon, which originates in the neighbouring municipality of Libermont, in the Département of Oise. Although peak tunnel "Souterrain de Panneterie" of the Canal du Nord lies outside the neighbouring municipality, it is named after Ferme La Panneterie located in Ercheu.

The castle-like Ferme Lannoy was a monastery named Notre Dame ('Our Lady') in the 14th century.

== History ==
There was once an Merovingian cemetery in Ercheu. Since 1120 there was also a leper colony.

In the First World War, the village was destroyed. The community received the Croix de guerre 1914-1918 as an award.

The former villages Bessancourt, Ramecourt, and Wailly-lès-Ercheu were abandoned.

== Population ==
Historical population
| Year | Pop. | ±% p.a. |
|---|---|---|
| 1968 | 576 | — |
| 1975 | 601 | +0.61% |
| 1982 | 648 | +1.08% |
| 1990 | 709 | +1.13% |
| 1999 | 704 | −0.08% |
| 2007 | 790 | +1.45% |
| 2012 | 813 | +0.58% |
| 2017 | 785 | −0.70% |
| 2023 | 751 | −0.74% |
Source: INSEE

== Administration ==
The current mayor is François Lamaire, in office since 2014 and re-elected in 2020. Ercheu is part of the communauté de communes du Grand Roye since January 1, 2012.

== Gallery ==
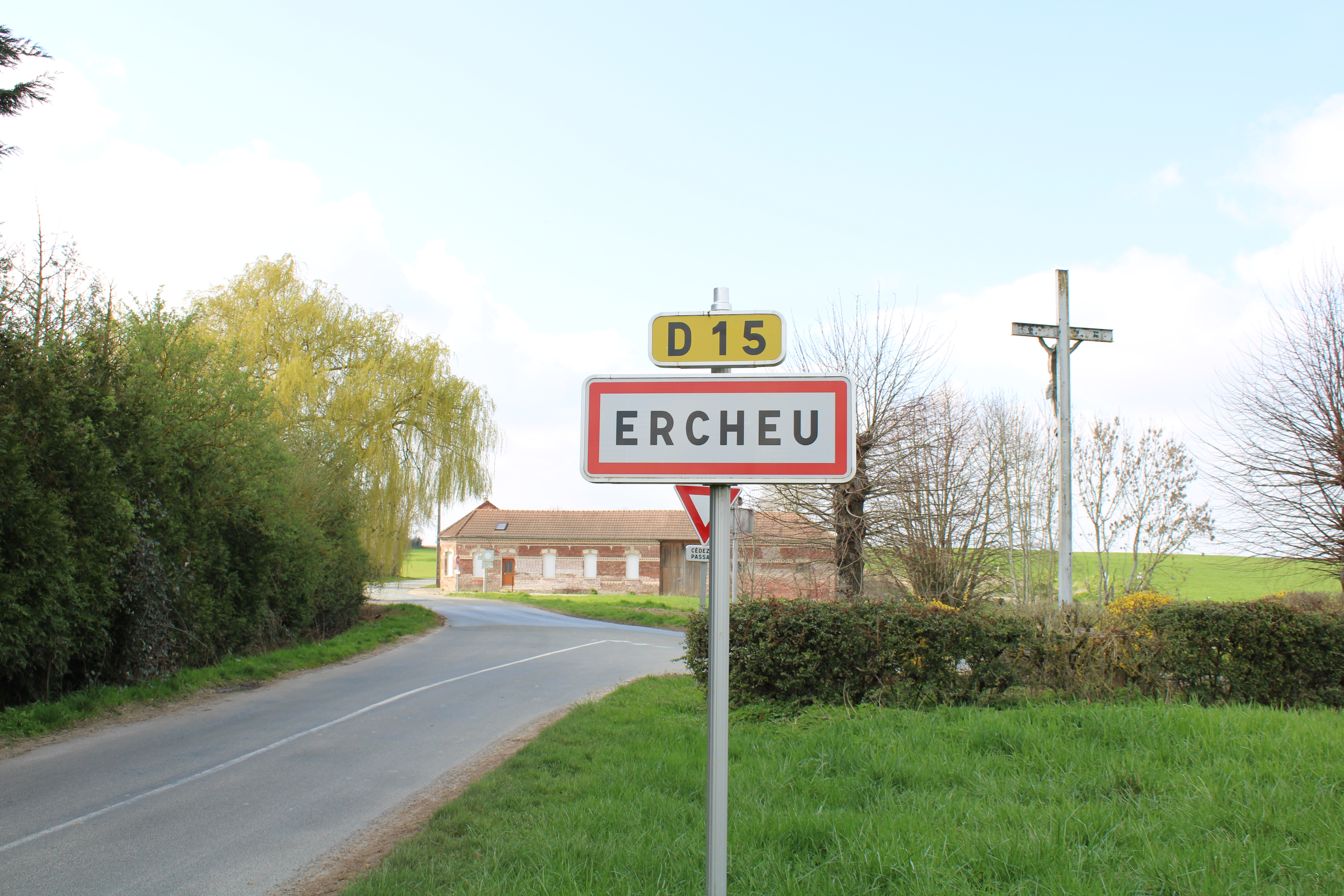
Entrance to Ercheu

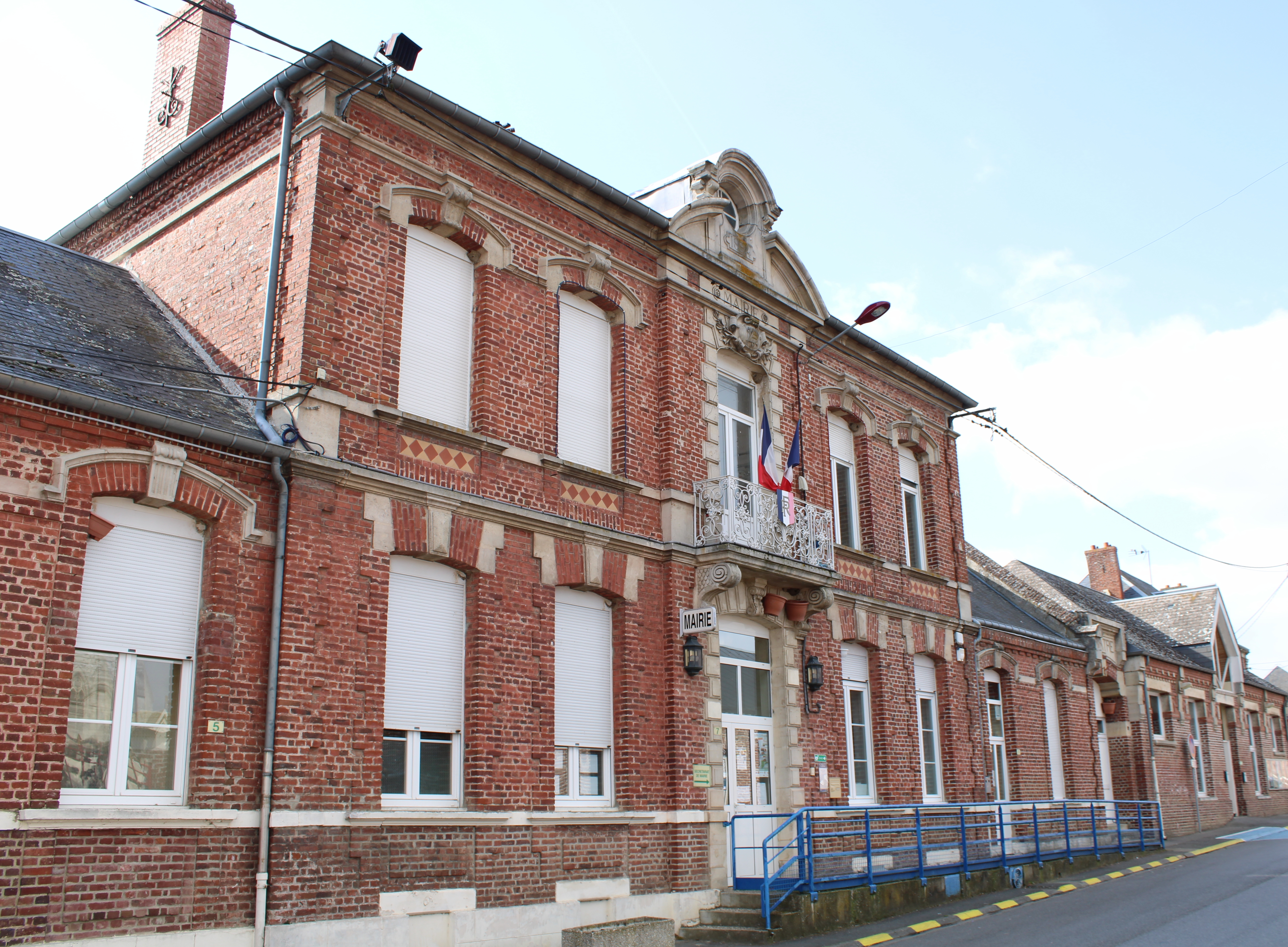
Town Hall

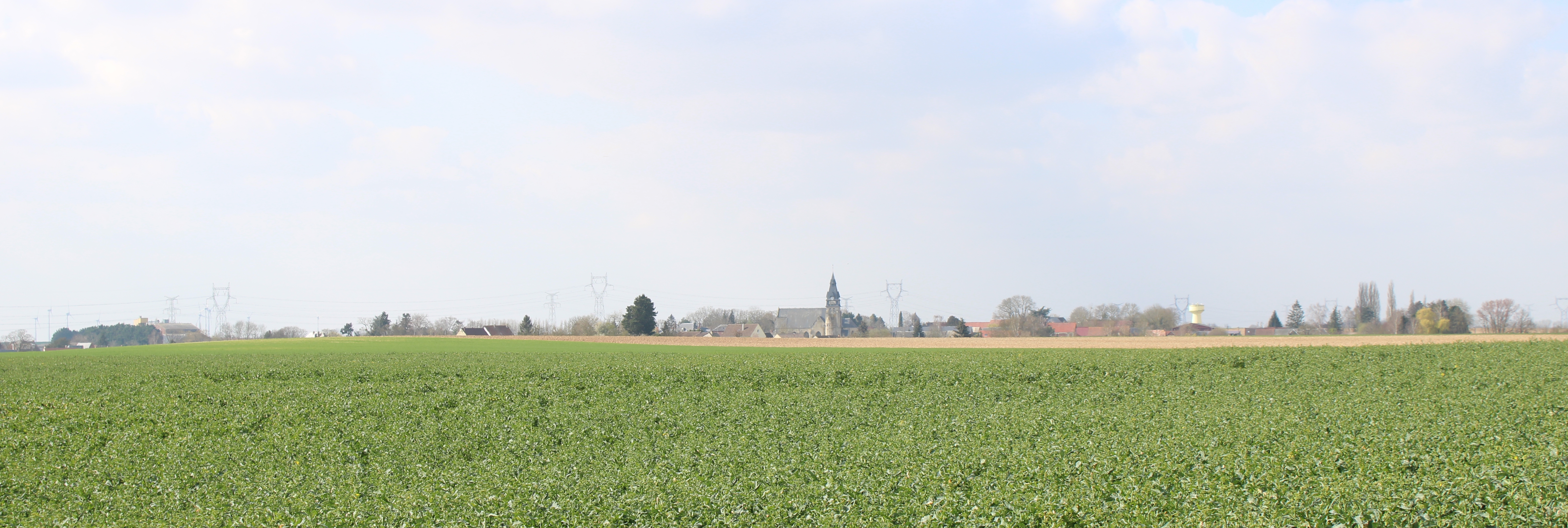
Panorama of Ercheu

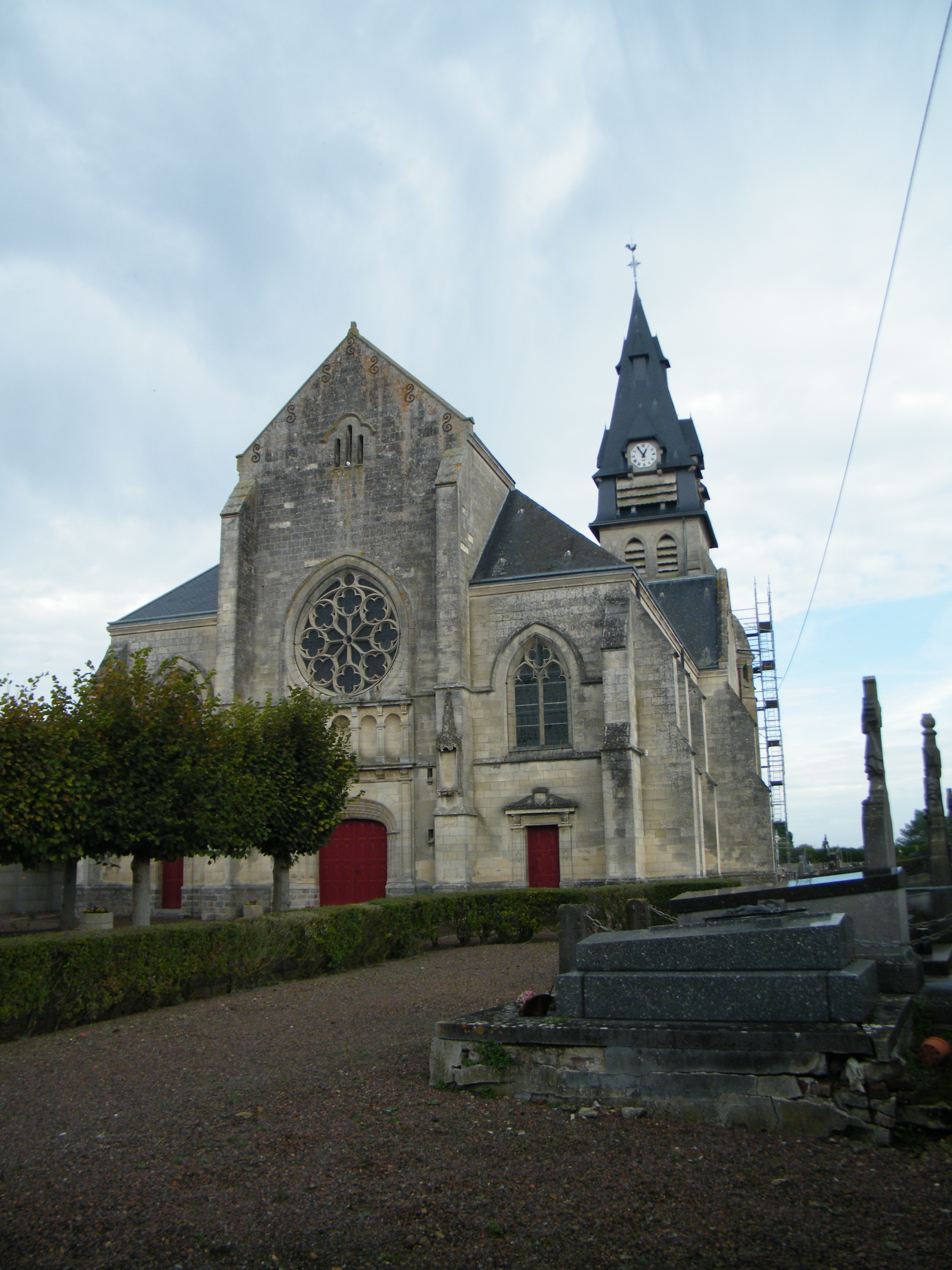
Church

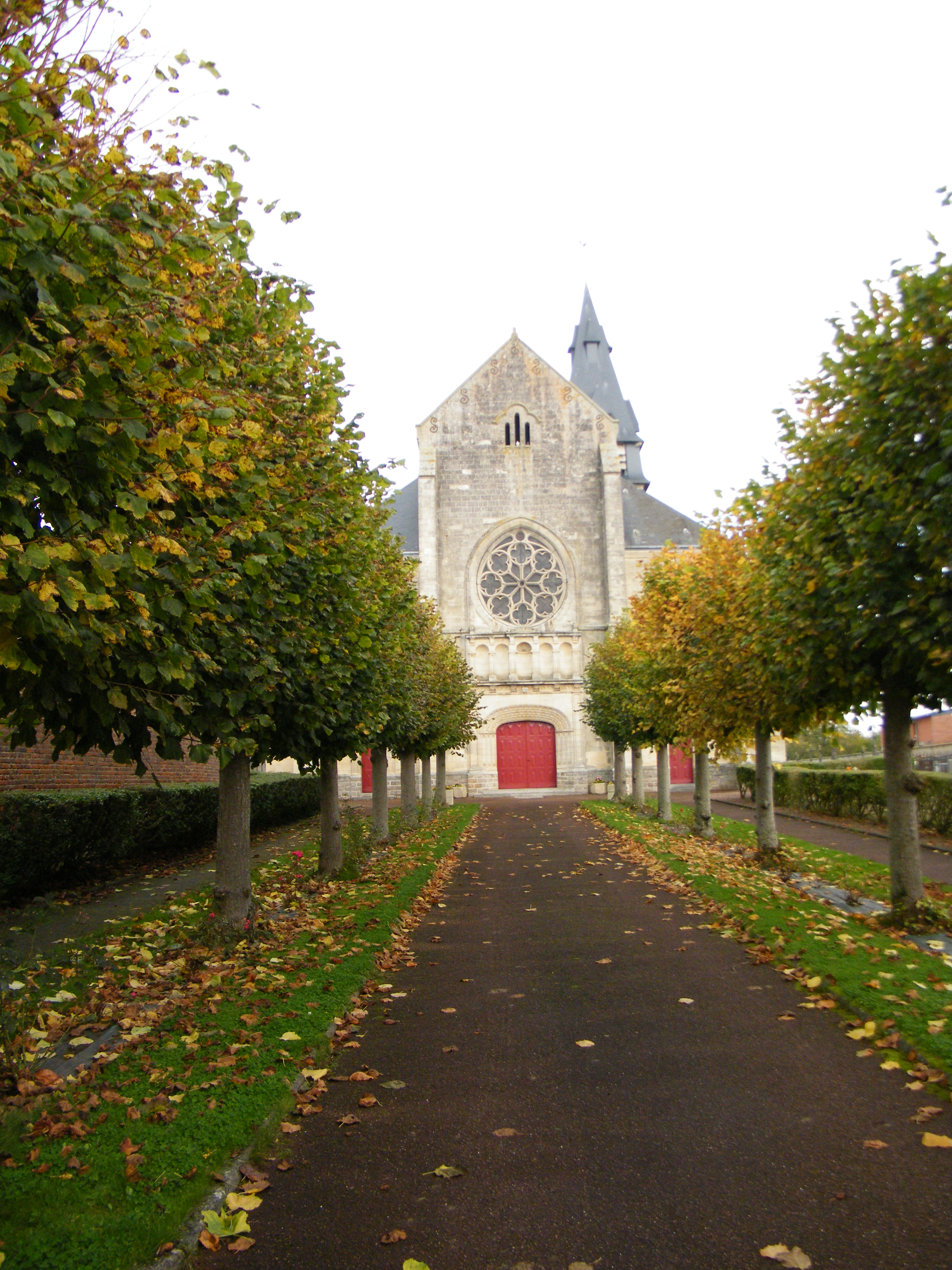
Church, front view

== See also ==
- Communes of the Somme department
