= Sempigny =

- Commune
- Location of Sempigny
- Location within France Location within Hauts-de-France
- Coordinates: 49°33′29″N 2°59′43″E
- Country: France
- Region: Hauts-de-France
- Department: Oise
- Arrondissement: Compiègne
- Canton: Noyon
- Intercommunality: Pays Noyonnais

Government
  - Mayor (2020–2026): Jean-Yves Dejoye
- Area^{1}: 4.4 km^{2} (1.7 sq mi)
- Elevation: 40 m (130 ft)
- Highest elevation: 56 m (184 ft)
- Lowest elevation: 35 m (115 ft)
- Population (2023): 760
  - Density: 170/km^{2} (450/sq mi)
- Time zone: UTC+01:00 (CET)
  - Summer (DST): UTC+02:00 (CEST)
- INSEE/Postal code: 60610 /60400
- ^{1} French Land Register data, which excludes lakes, ponds, glaciers > 1 km^{2} (0.386 sq mi or 247 acres) and river estuaries.

Sempigny (French pronunciation: [sɑ̃piɲi]) is a commune in the Oise department in northern France.

== See also ==
- Communes of the Oise department
