= Larbroye =

- Commune
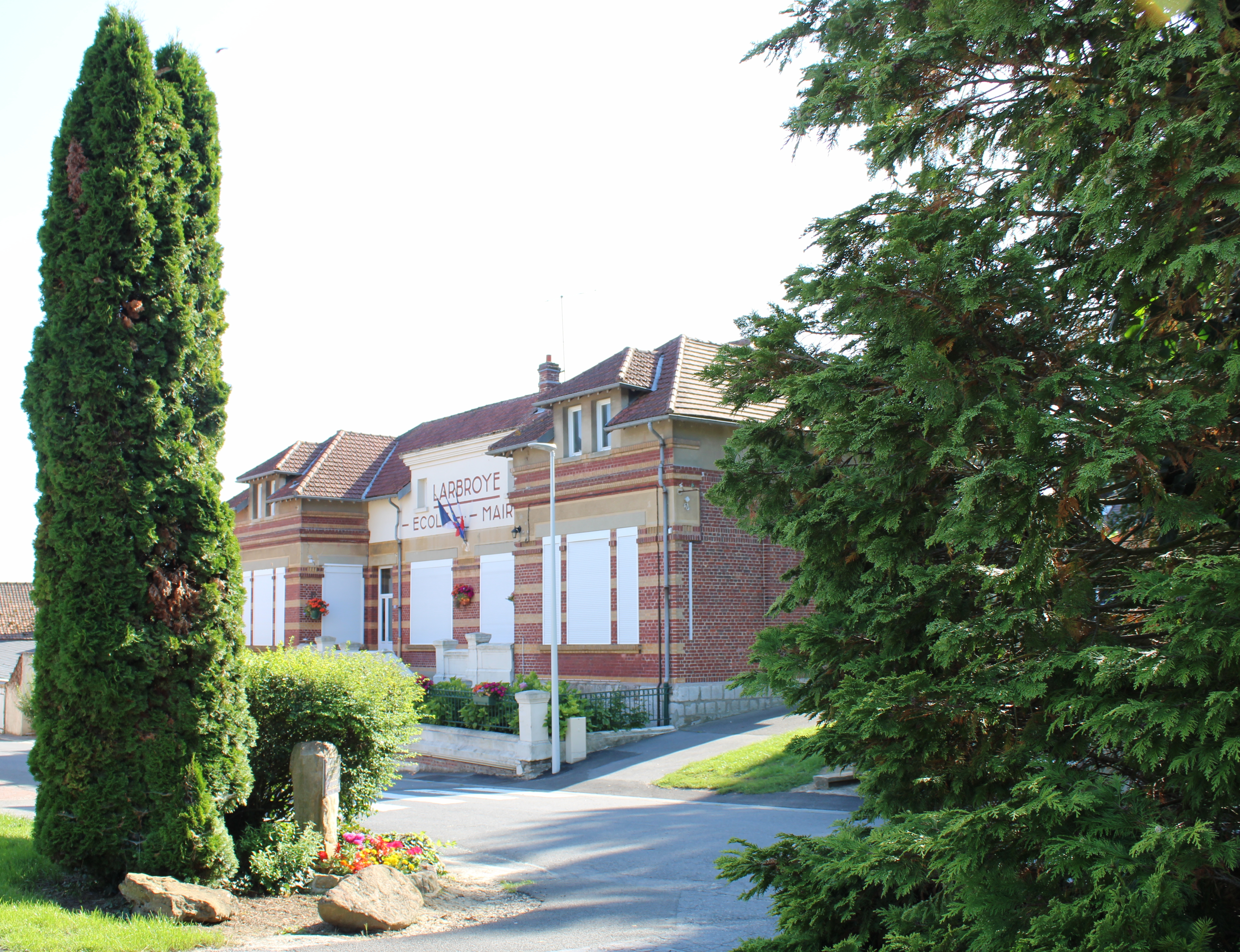
- Larbroye Town hall
- Location of Larbroye
- Location within France Location within Hauts-de-France
- Coordinates: 49°34′25″N 2°57′56″E
- Country: France
- Region: Hauts-de-France
- Department: Oise
- Arrondissement: Compiègne
- Canton: Noyon
- Intercommunality: Pays Noyonnais

Government
  - Mayor (2020–2026): Didier Wattiaux
- Area^{1}: 2.2 km^{2} (0.85 sq mi)
- Elevation: 70 m (230 ft)
- Highest elevation: 150 m (490 ft)
- Lowest elevation: 48 m (157 ft)
- Population (2023): 505
  - Density: 230/km^{2} (590/sq mi)
- Time zone: UTC+01:00 (CET)
  - Summer (DST): UTC+02:00 (CEST)
- INSEE/Postal code: 60348 /60400
- ^{1} French Land Register data, which excludes lakes, ponds, glaciers > 1 km^{2} (0.386 sq mi or 247 acres) and river estuaries.

Larbroye (French pronunciation: [laʁbʁwa]) is a commune in the Oise department in northern France.

== See also ==
- Communes of the Oise department
