= Genvry =

- Commune
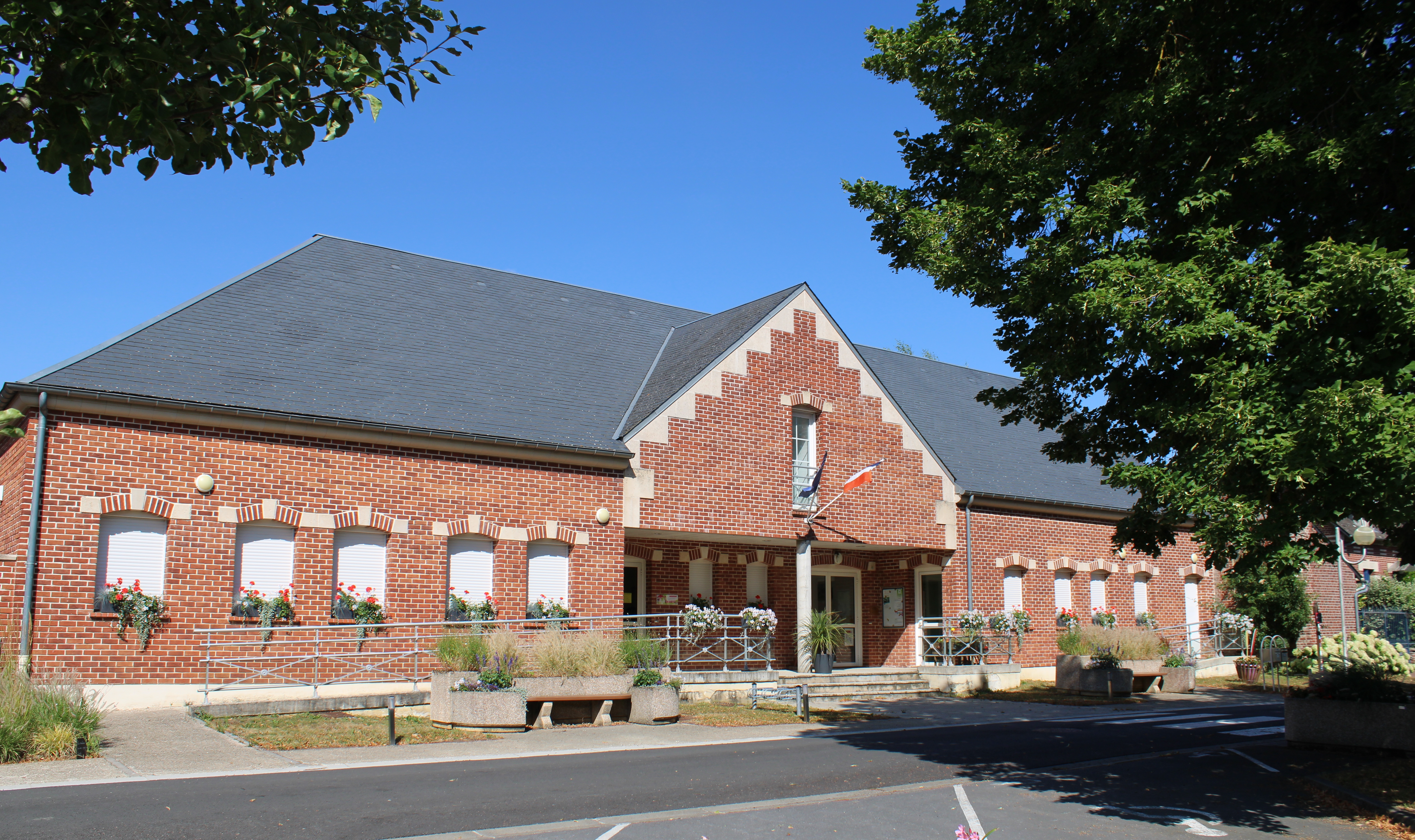
- Town hall
- Location of Genvry
- Location within France Location within Hauts-de-France
- Coordinates: 49°36′41″N 2°59′26″E
- Country: France
- Region: Hauts-de-France
- Department: Oise
- Arrondissement: Compiègne
- Canton: Noyon
- Intercommunality: Pays Noyonnais

Government
  - Mayor (2020–2026): Claude Peleman
- Area^{1}: 5.14 km^{2} (1.98 sq mi)
- Elevation: 70 m (230 ft)
- Highest elevation: 97 m (318 ft)
- Lowest elevation: 42 m (138 ft)
- Population (2023): 317
  - Density: 61.7/km^{2} (160/sq mi)
- Time zone: UTC+01:00 (CET)
  - Summer (DST): UTC+02:00 (CEST)
- INSEE/Postal code: 60270 /60400
- ^{1} French Land Register data, which excludes lakes, ponds, glaciers > 1 km^{2} (0.386 sq mi or 247 acres) and river estuaries.

Genvry (French pronunciation: [ʒɑ̃vʁi]) is a commune in the Oise department in northern France.

== See also ==
- Communes of the Oise department
