= Beaurains-lès-Noyon =

- Commune
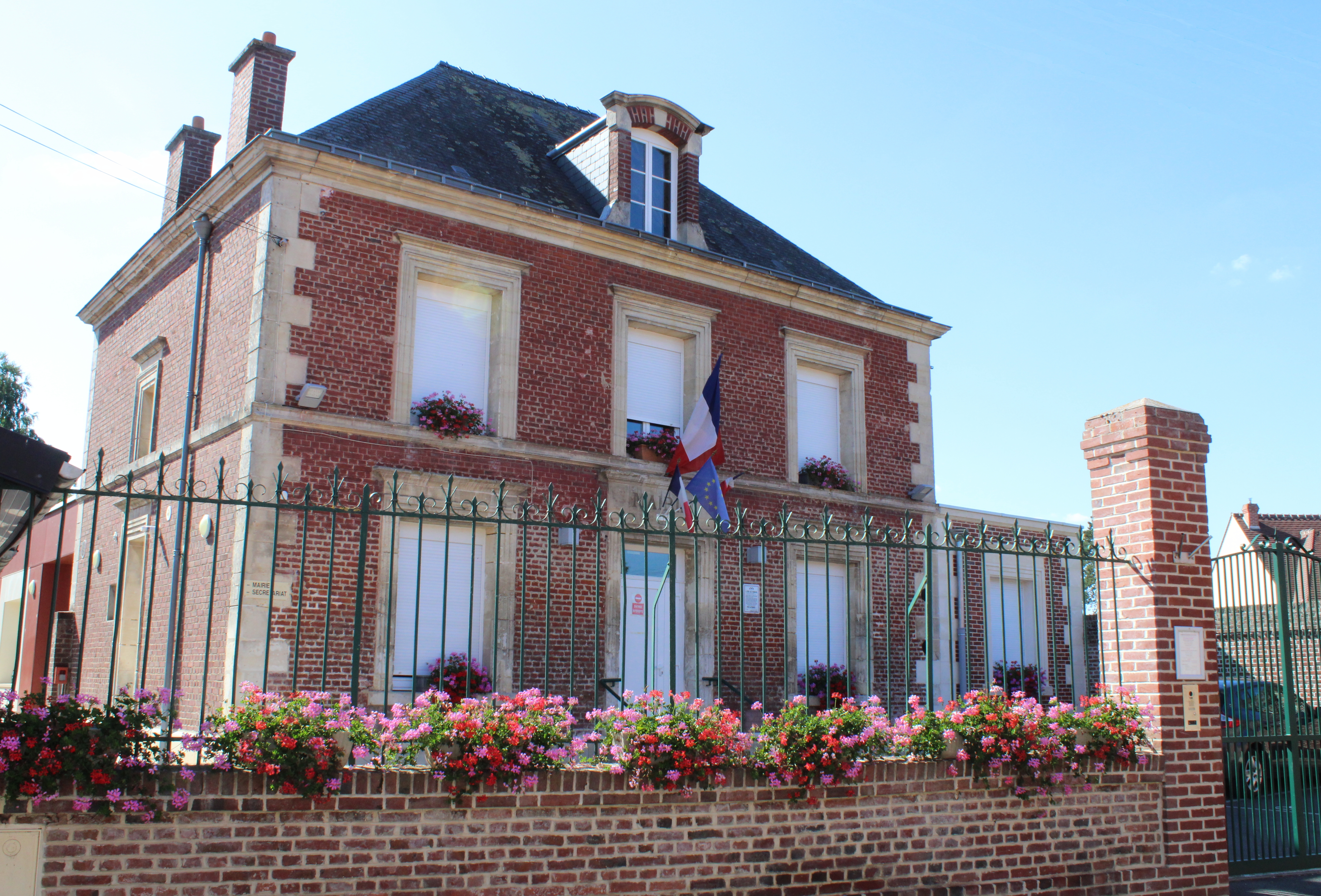
- Town hall
- Location of Beaurains-lès-Noyon
- Location within France Location within Hauts-de-France
- Coordinates: 49°36′41″N 2°58′25″E
- Country: France
- Region: Hauts-de-France
- Department: Oise
- Arrondissement: Compiègne
- Canton: Noyon
- Intercommunality: Pays Noyonnais

Government
  - Mayor (2020–2026): Daniel Hardier
- Area^{1}: 3.8 km^{2} (1.5 sq mi)
- Elevation: 79 m (259 ft)
- Highest elevation: 74 m (243 ft)
- Lowest elevation: 42 m (138 ft)
- Population (2023): 341
  - Density: 90/km^{2} (230/sq mi)
- Time zone: UTC+01:00 (CET)
  - Summer (DST): UTC+02:00 (CEST)
- INSEE/Postal code: 60055 /60400
- ^{1} French Land Register data, which excludes lakes, ponds, glaciers > 1 km^{2} (0.386 sq mi or 247 acres) and river estuaries.

Beaurains-lès-Noyon (French pronunciation: [boʁɛ̃ lɛ nwajɔ̃], literally Beaurains near Noyon) is a commune in the Oise department in northern France.

== Population ==
Historical population
Year	Pop.	±% p.a.
1968	193	—
1975	233	+2.73%
1982	234	+0.06%
1990	284	+2.45%
1999	264	−0.81%
2007	282	+0.83%
2012	293	+0.77%
2017	338	+2.90%
2023	341	+0.15%
Source: INSEE

== See also ==
- Communes of the Oise department
