= Passel =

- Commune
- Location of Passel
- Location within France Location within Hauts-de-France
- Coordinates: 49°33′27″N 2°57′47″E
- Country: France
- Region: Hauts-de-France
- Department: Oise
- Arrondissement: Compiègne
- Canton: Noyon
- Intercommunality: Pays Noyonnais

Government
  - Mayor (2020–2026): Olivier Grioche
- Area^{1}: 3.65 km^{2} (1.41 sq mi)
- Elevation: 42 m (138 ft)
- Highest elevation: 95 m (312 ft)
- Lowest elevation: 36 m (118 ft)
- Population (2023): 271
  - Density: 74.2/km^{2} (192/sq mi)
- Time zone: UTC+01:00 (CET)
  - Summer (DST): UTC+02:00 (CEST)
- INSEE/Postal code: 60488 /60400
- ^{1} French Land Register data, which excludes lakes, ponds, glaciers > 1 km^{2} (0.386 sq mi or 247 acres) and river estuaries.

Passel (French pronunciation: [pasɛl]) is a commune in the Oise department in northern France.

== See also ==
- Communes of the Oise department
