= Le Plessis-Patte-d'Oie =

- Commune
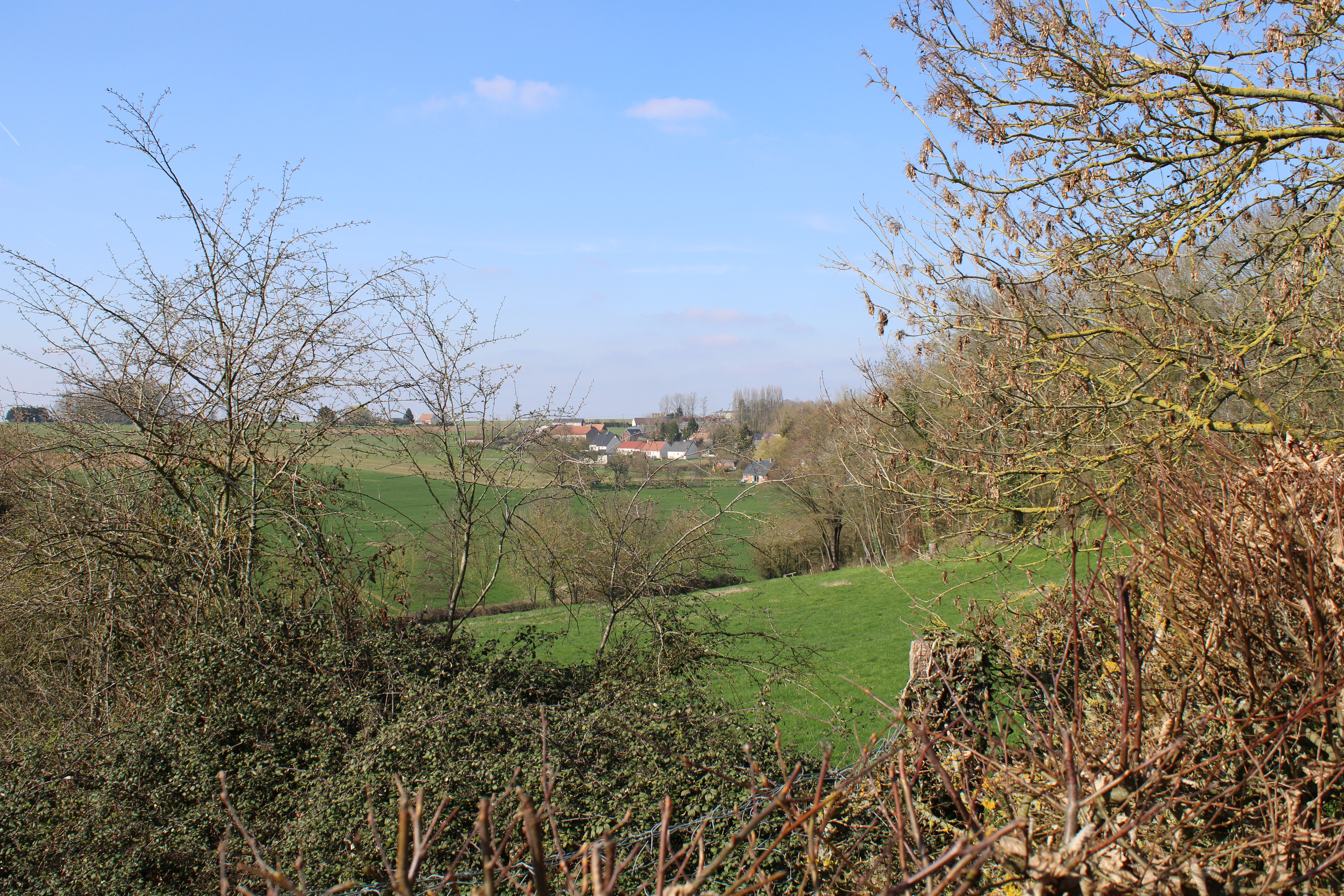
- A general view of Le Plessis-Patte-d'Oie
- Location of Le Plessis-Patte-d'Oie
- Location within France Location within Hauts-de-France
- Coordinates: 49°40′59″N 3°04′12″E
- Country: France
- Region: Hauts-de-France
- Department: Oise
- Arrondissement: Compiègne
- Canton: Noyon
- Intercommunality: Pays Noyonnais

Government
  - Mayor (2020–2026): Christine Lampaert
- Area^{1}: 2.82 km^{2} (1.09 sq mi)
- Elevation: 95 m (312 ft)
- Highest elevation: 97 m (318 ft)
- Lowest elevation: 62 m (203 ft)
- Population (2023): 113
  - Density: 40.1/km^{2} (104/sq mi)
- Time zone: UTC+01:00 (CET)
  - Summer (DST): UTC+02:00 (CEST)
- INSEE/Postal code: 60502 /60640
- ^{1} French Land Register data, which excludes lakes, ponds, glaciers > 1 km^{2} (0.386 sq mi or 247 acres) and river estuaries.

Le Plessis-Patte-d'Oie (French pronunciation: [lə plɛsi pat dwa]) is a commune in the Oise department in northern France.

== See also ==
- Communes of the Oise department
