= Quesmy =

- Commune
- Location of Quesmy
- Location within France Location within Hauts-de-France
- Coordinates: 49°38′05″N 3°03′36″E
- Country: France
- Region: Hauts-de-France
- Department: Oise
- Arrondissement: Compiègne
- Canton: Noyon
- Intercommunality: Pays Noyonnais

Government
  - Mayor (2020–2026): Patrick Thierry
- Area^{1}: 4.83 km^{2} (1.86 sq mi)
- Elevation: 200 m (660 ft)
- Highest elevation: 174 m (571 ft)
- Lowest elevation: 58 m (190 ft)
- Population (2023): 171
  - Density: 35.4/km^{2} (91.7/sq mi)
- Time zone: UTC+01:00 (CET)
  - Summer (DST): UTC+02:00 (CEST)
- INSEE/Postal code: 60519 /60640
- ^{1} French Land Register data, which excludes lakes, ponds, glaciers > 1 km^{2} (0.386 sq mi or 247 acres) and river estuaries.

Quesmy (French pronunciation: [kɛmi]) is a commune in the Oise department in northern France.

== See also ==
- Communes of the Oise department
