= Pontoise-lès-Noyon =

- Commune
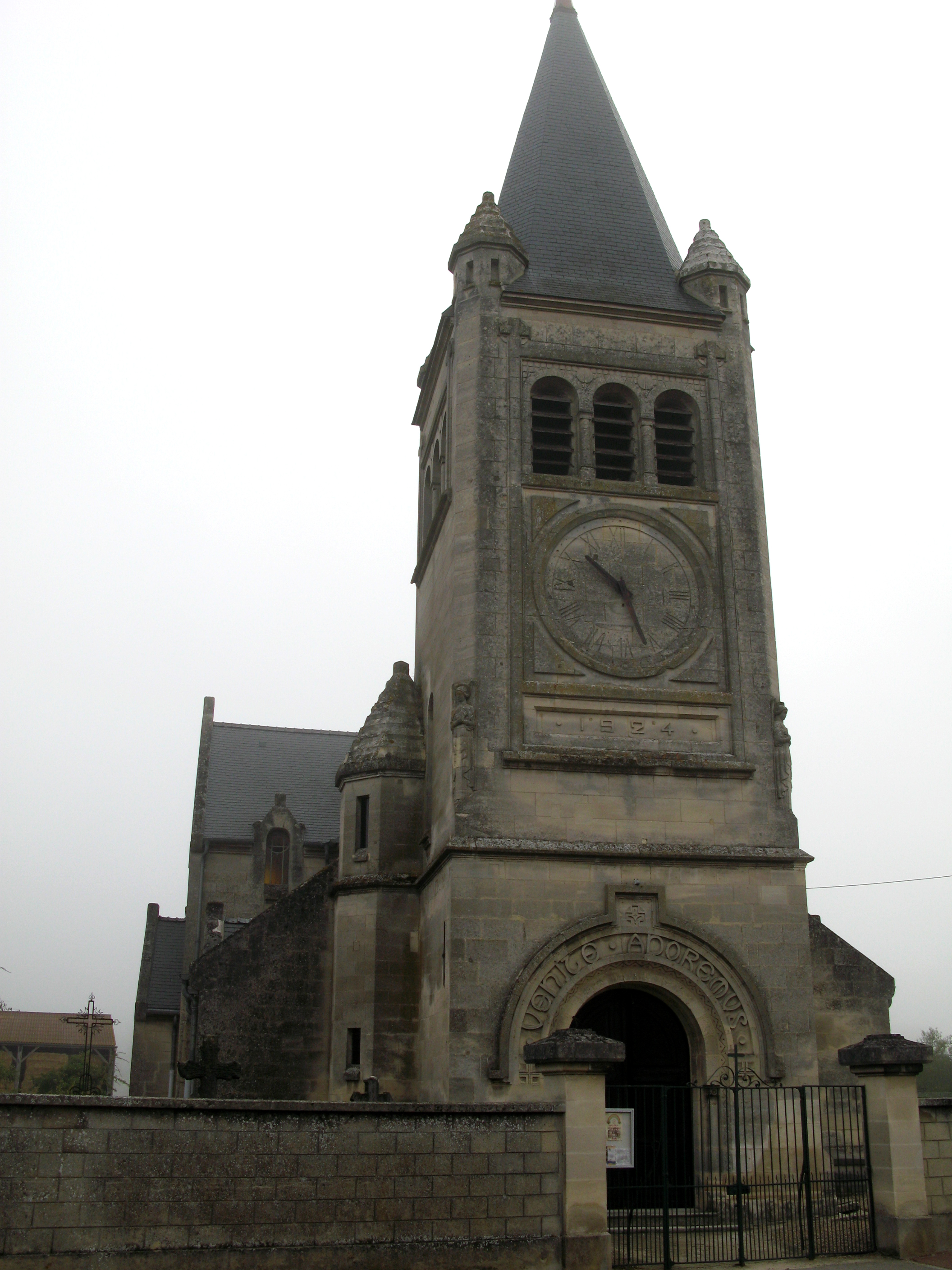
- The church in Pontoise-lès-Noyon

- Coat of arms
- Location of Pontoise-lès-Noyon
- Location within France Location within Hauts-de-France
- Coordinates: 49°33′12″N 3°02′58″E
- Country: France
- Region: Hauts-de-France
- Department: Oise
- Arrondissement: Compiègne
- Canton: Noyon
- Intercommunality: Pays Noyonnais

Government
  - Mayor (2020–2026): Jacques Soufflet
- Area^{1}: 6.58 km^{2} (2.54 sq mi)
- Highest elevation: 59 m (194 ft)
- Lowest elevation: 37 m (121 ft)
- Population (2023): 427
  - Density: 64.9/km^{2} (168/sq mi)
- Time zone: UTC+01:00 (CET)
  - Summer (DST): UTC+02:00 (CEST)
- INSEE/Postal code: 60507 /60400
- ^{1} French Land Register data, which excludes lakes, ponds, glaciers > 1 km^{2} (0.386 sq mi or 247 acres) and river estuaries.

Pontoise-lès-Noyon (French pronunciation: [pɔ̃twaz lɛ nwajɔ̃], literally Pontoise near Noyon) is a commune in the Oise department in northern France.

== See also ==
- Communes of the Oise department
