= Caisnes =

- Commune
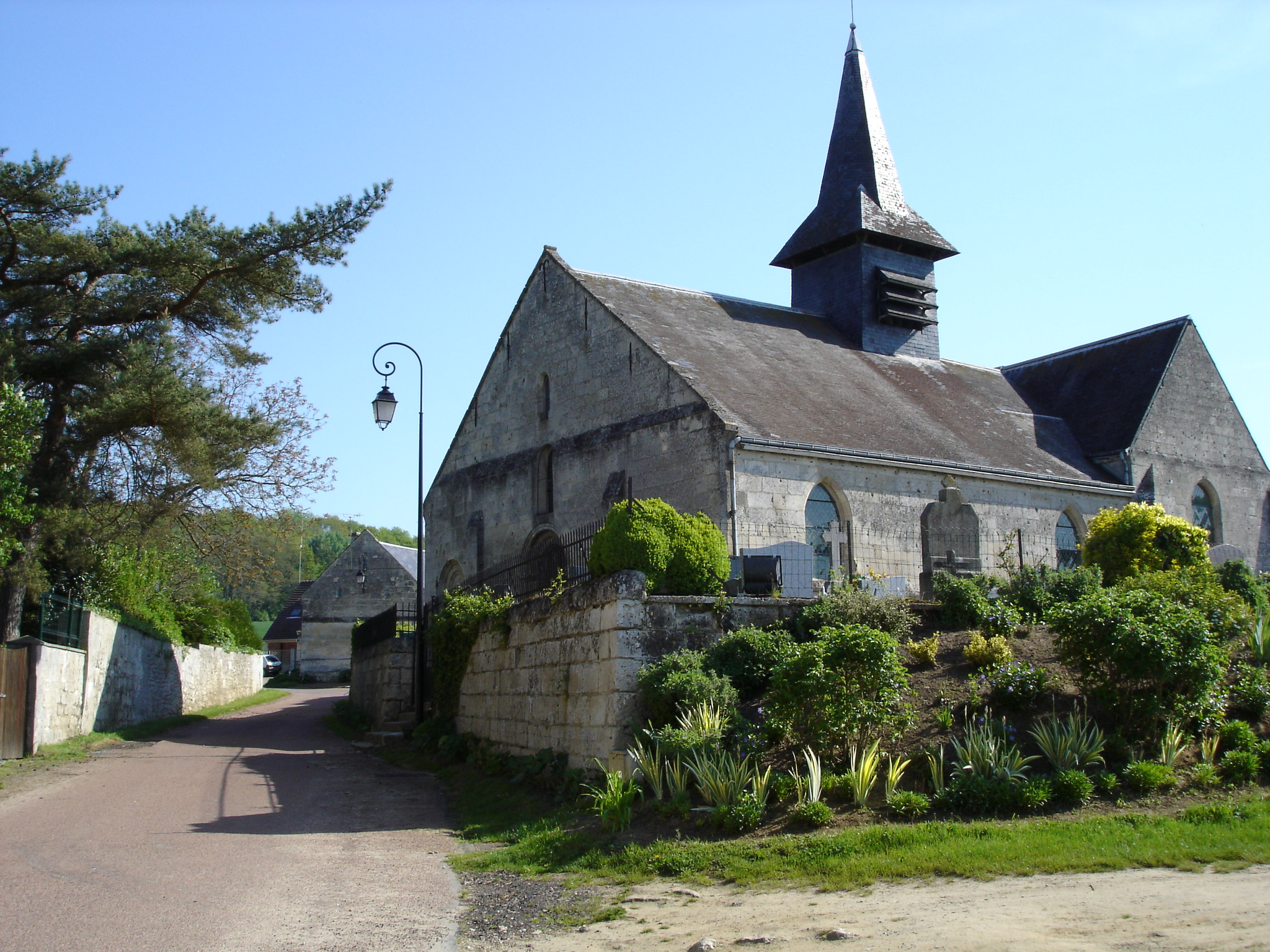
- The church in Caisnes
- Location of Caisnes
- Location within France Location within Hauts-de-France
- Coordinates: 49°31′18″N 3°04′17″E
- Country: France
- Region: Hauts-de-France
- Department: Oise
- Arrondissement: Compiègne
- Canton: Noyon
- Intercommunality: Pays Noyonnais

Government
  - Mayor (2020–2026): Jean-Pierre Wallois
- Area^{1}: 6.19 km^{2} (2.39 sq mi)
- Elevation: 75 m (246 ft)
- Highest elevation: 154 m (505 ft)
- Lowest elevation: 46 m (151 ft)
- Population (2023): 518
  - Density: 83.7/km^{2} (217/sq mi)
- Time zone: UTC+01:00 (CET)
  - Summer (DST): UTC+02:00 (CEST)
- INSEE/Postal code: 60118 /60400
- ^{1} French Land Register data, which excludes lakes, ponds, glaciers > 1 km^{2} (0.386 sq mi or 247 acres) and river estuaries.

Caisnes (French pronunciation: [kɛn]) is a commune in the Oise department in northern France.

== Population ==
Historical population
Year	Pop.	±% p.a.
1968	208	—
1975	231	+1.51%
1982	295	+3.56%
1990	327	+1.30%
1999	424	+2.93%
2007	477	+1.48%
2012	508	+1.27%
2017	511	+0.12%
2023	518	+0.23%
Source: INSEE

== See also ==
- Communes of the Oise department
