= Brétigny, Oise =

Brétigny
- Commune
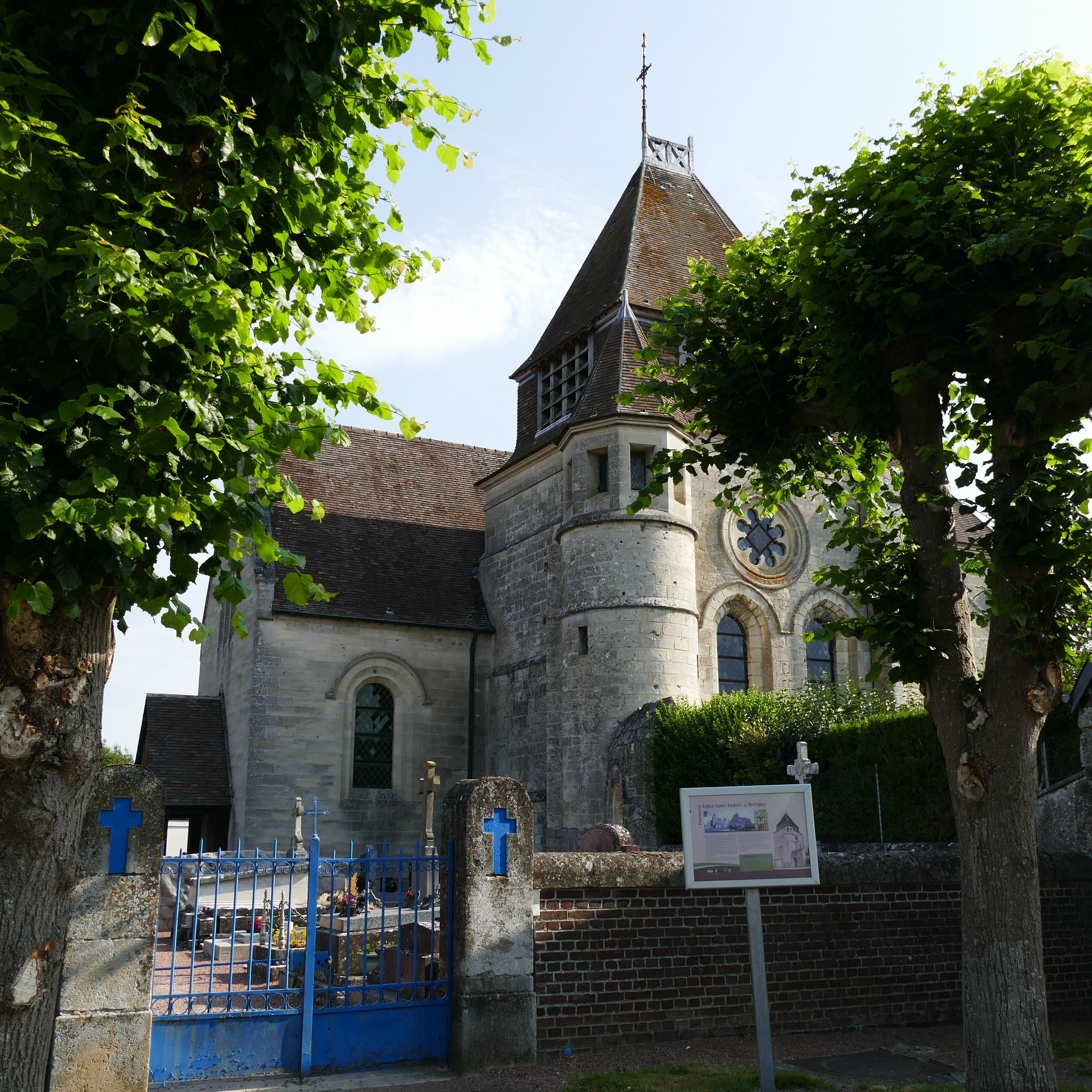
- The church in Brétigny
- Location of Brétigny
- Location within France Location within Hauts-de-France
- Coordinates: 49°34′05″N 3°06′44″E
- Country: France
- Region: Hauts-de-France
- Department: Oise
- Arrondissement: Compiègne
- Canton: Noyon
- Intercommunality: Pays Noyonnais

Government
  - Mayor (2020–2026): David Doucet
- Area^{1}: 5.16 km^{2} (1.99 sq mi)
- Elevation: 43 m (141 ft)
- Highest elevation: 66 m (217 ft)
- Lowest elevation: 37 m (121 ft)
- Population (2023): 435
  - Density: 84.3/km^{2} (218/sq mi)
- Time zone: UTC+01:00 (CET)
  - Summer (DST): UTC+02:00 (CEST)
- INSEE/Postal code: 60105 /60400
- ^{1} French Land Register data, which excludes lakes, ponds, glaciers > 1 km^{2} (0.386 sq mi or 247 acres) and river estuaries.

Brétigny (French pronunciation: [bʁetiɲi]) is a commune in the Oise department in northern France.

== Population ==
Historical population
Year	Pop.	±% p.a.
1968	230	—
1975	257	+1.60%
1982	311	+2.76%
1990	302	−0.37%
1999	324	+0.78%
2007	357	+1.22%
2012	404	+2.50%
2017	410	+0.30%
2023	435	+0.99%
Source: INSEE

== See also ==
- Communes of the Oise department
