= Porquéricourt =

- Commune
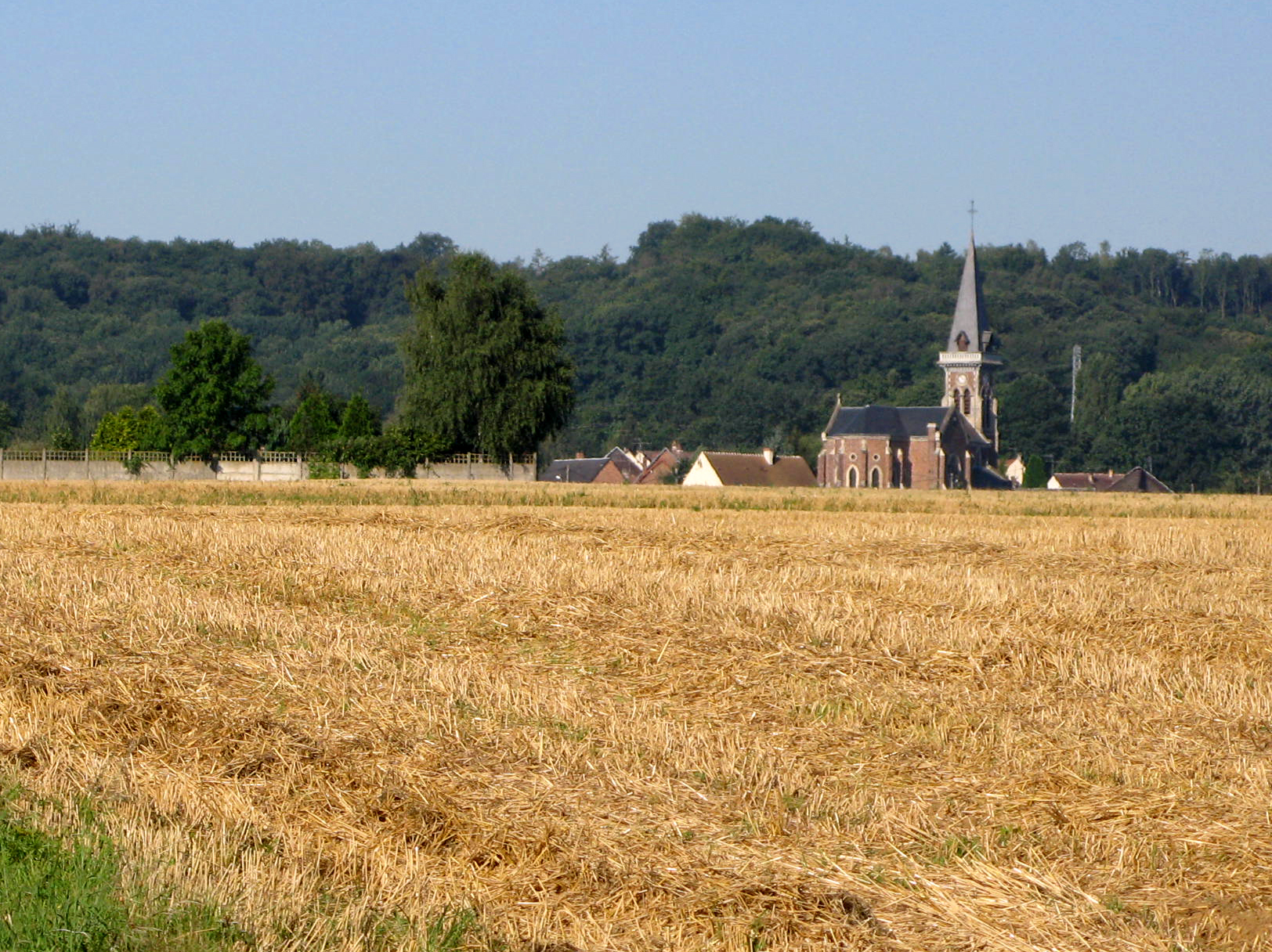
- A general view of Porquéricourt
- Location of Porquéricourt
- Location within France Location within Hauts-de-France
- Coordinates: FR-60 49°35′39″N 2°57′39″E
- Country: France
- Region: Hauts-de-France
- Department: Oise
- Arrondissement: Compiègne
- Canton: Noyon
- Intercommunality: Pays Noyonnais

Government
  - Mayor (2020–2026): Fabien Barege
- Area^{1}: 3.75 km^{2} (1.45 sq mi)
- Elevation: 78 m (256 ft)
- Highest elevation: 154 m (505 ft)
- Lowest elevation: 46 m (151 ft)
- Population (2023): 416
  - Density: 111/km^{2} (287/sq mi)
- Time zone: UTC+01:00 (CET)
  - Summer (DST): UTC+02:00 (CEST)
- INSEE/Postal code: 60511 /60400
- ^{1} French Land Register data, which excludes lakes, ponds, glaciers > 1 km^{2} (0.386 sq mi or 247 acres) and river estuaries.

Porquéricourt (French pronunciation: [pɔʁkeʁikuʁ]) is a commune in the Oise department in northern France.

== See also ==
- Communes of the Oise department
