= Golancourt =

- Commune
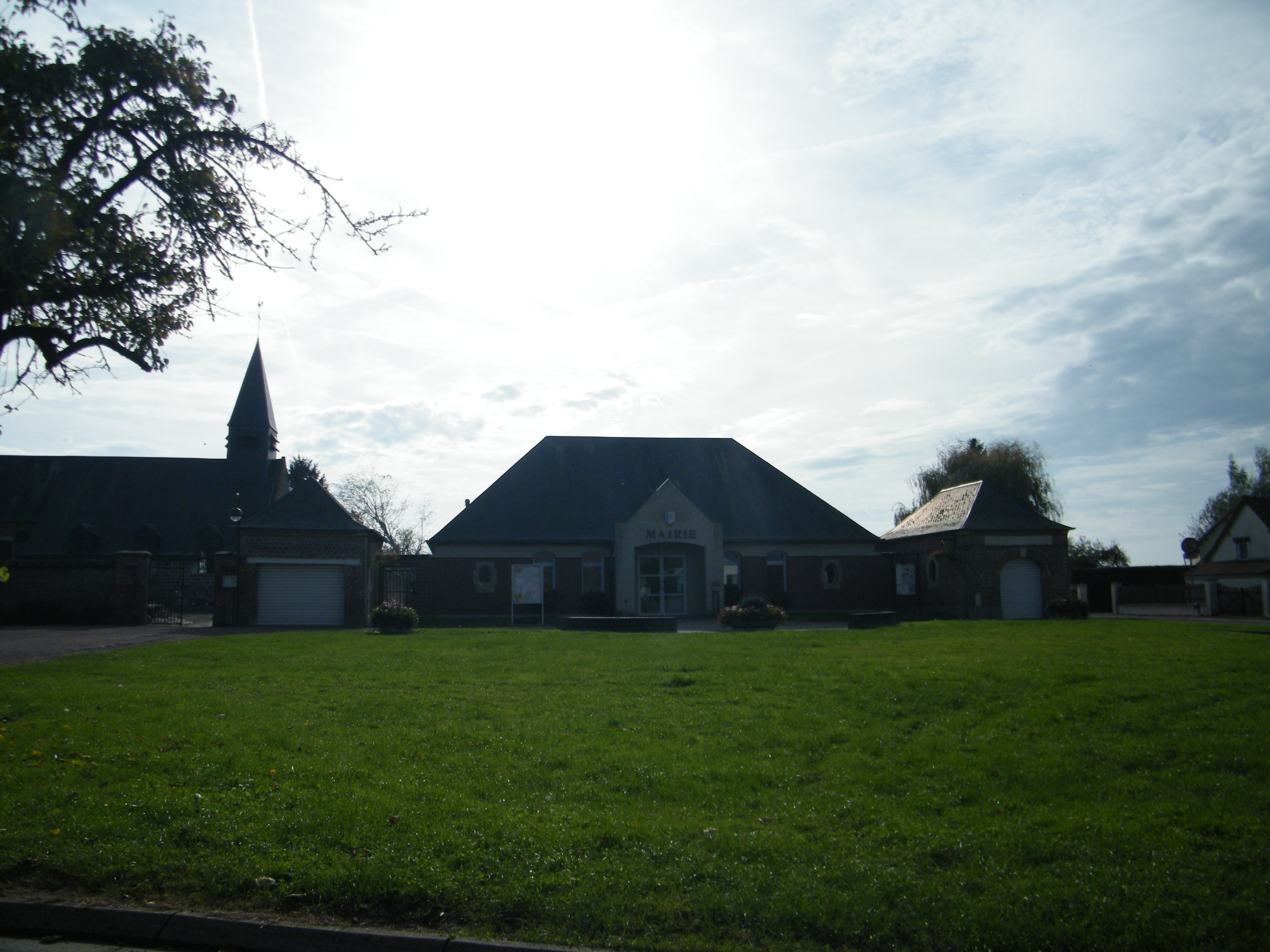
- A general view of Golancourt
- Location of Golancourt
- Location within France Location within Hauts-de-France
- Coordinates: 49°42′24″N 3°03′54″E
- Country: France
- Region: Hauts-de-France
- Department: Oise
- Arrondissement: Compiègne
- Canton: Noyon
- Intercommunality: Pays Noyonnais

Government
  - Mayor (2020–2026): David Louvrier
- Area^{1}: 4.13 km^{2} (1.59 sq mi)
- Elevation: 67 m (220 ft)
- Highest elevation: 92 m (302 ft)
- Lowest elevation: 61 m (200 ft)
- Population (2023): 409
  - Density: 99.0/km^{2} (256/sq mi)
- Time zone: UTC+01:00 (CET)
  - Summer (DST): UTC+02:00 (CEST)
- INSEE/Postal code: 60278 /60640
- ^{1} French Land Register data, which excludes lakes, ponds, glaciers > 1 km^{2} (0.386 sq mi or 247 acres) and river estuaries.

Golancourt (French pronunciation: [ɡɔlɑ̃kuʁ]) is a commune in the Oise department in northern France.

== See also ==
- Communes of the Oise department
