= Grandrû =

- Commune
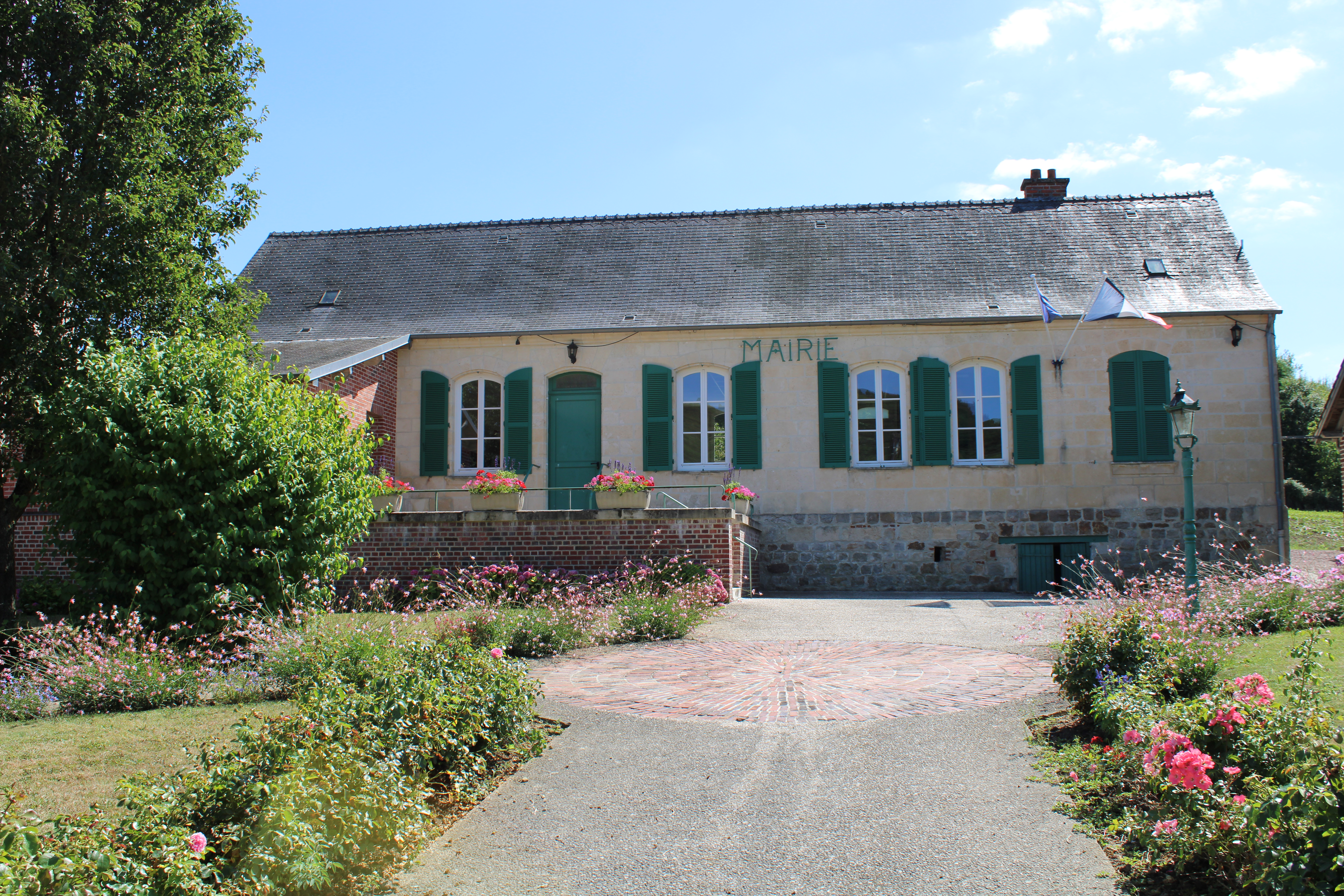
- Grandrû Town hall
- Location of Grandrû
- Location within France Location within Hauts-de-France
- Coordinates: 49°36′26″N 3°05′16″E
- Country: France
- Region: Hauts-de-France
- Department: Oise
- Arrondissement: Compiègne
- Canton: Noyon
- Intercommunality: Pays Noyonnais

Government
  - Mayor (2020–2026): Jean-Claude Boisselier
- Area^{1}: 7.35 km^{2} (2.84 sq mi)
- Elevation: 40 m (130 ft)
- Highest elevation: 187 m (614 ft)
- Lowest elevation: 58 m (190 ft)
- Population (2023): 371
  - Density: 50.5/km^{2} (131/sq mi)
- Time zone: UTC+01:00 (CET)
  - Summer (DST): UTC+02:00 (CEST)
- INSEE/Postal code: 60287 /60400
- ^{1} French Land Register data, which excludes lakes, ponds, glaciers > 1 km^{2} (0.386 sq mi or 247 acres) and river estuaries.

Grandrû is a commune in the Oise department in northern France.

== See also ==
- Communes of the Oise department
