= Mondescourt =

- Commune
- Location of Mondescourt
- Location within France Location within Hauts-de-France
- Coordinates: 49°35′57″N 3°06′46″E
- Country: France
- Region: Hauts-de-France
- Department: Oise
- Arrondissement: Compiègne
- Canton: Noyon
- Intercommunality: Pays Noyonnais

Government
  - Mayor (2020–2026): André Pinçon
- Area^{1}: 3.19 km^{2} (1.23 sq mi)
- Elevation: 55 m (180 ft)
- Highest elevation: 146 m (479 ft)
- Lowest elevation: 48 m (157 ft)
- Population (2023): 247
  - Density: 77.4/km^{2} (201/sq mi)
- Time zone: UTC+01:00 (CET)
  - Summer (DST): UTC+02:00 (CEST)
- INSEE/Postal code: 60410 /60400
- ^{1} French Land Register data, which excludes lakes, ponds, glaciers > 1 km^{2} (0.386 sq mi or 247 acres) and river estuaries.

Mondescourt (French pronunciation: [mɔ̃dkuʁ]) is a commune in the Oise department in northern France.

== See also ==
- Communes of the Oise department
