= Beaugies-sous-Bois =

- Commune
- Location of Beaugies-sous-Bois
- Location within France Location within Hauts-de-France
- Coordinates: 49°38′18″N 3°06′14″E
- Country: France
- Region: Hauts-de-France
- Department: Oise
- Arrondissement: Compiègne
- Canton: Noyon
- Intercommunality: Pays Noyonnais

Government
  - Mayor (2020–2026): Didier Béranger
- Area^{1}: 3.91 km^{2} (1.51 sq mi)
- Elevation: 90 m (300 ft)
- Highest elevation: 181 m (594 ft)
- Lowest elevation: 67 m (220 ft)
- Population (2023): 104
  - Density: 26.6/km^{2} (68.9/sq mi)
- Time zone: UTC+01:00 (CET)
  - Summer (DST): UTC+02:00 (CEST)
- INSEE/Postal code: 60052 /60640
- ^{1} French Land Register data, which excludes lakes, ponds, glaciers > 1 km^{2} (0.386 sq mi or 247 acres) and river estuaries.

Beaugies-sous-Bois (French pronunciation: [boʒi su bwa]) is a commune in the Oise department in northern France.

== Population ==
Historical population
Year	Pop.	±% p.a.
1968	79	—
1975	87	+1.39%
1982	82	−0.84%
1990	83	+0.15%
1999	83	+0.00%
2007	85	+0.30%
2012	94	+2.03%
2017	101	+1.45%
2023	104	+0.49%
Source: INSEE

== See also ==
- Communes of the Oise department
