= Suzoy =

- Commune
- Coat of arms
- Location of Suzoy
- Location within France Location within Hauts-de-France
- Coordinates: 49°34′50″N 2°57′00″E
- Country: France
- Region: Hauts-de-France
- Department: Oise
- Arrondissement: Compiègne
- Canton: Noyon
- Intercommunality: Pays Noyonnais

Government
  - Mayor (2020–2026): Philippe Watremez
- Area^{1}: 5.17 km^{2} (2.00 sq mi)
- Elevation: 120 m (390 ft)
- Highest elevation: 160 m (520 ft)
- Lowest elevation: 60 m (200 ft)
- Population (2023): 518
  - Density: 100/km^{2} (259/sq mi)
- Time zone: UTC+01:00 (CET)
  - Summer (DST): UTC+02:00 (CEST)
- INSEE/Postal code: 60625 /60400
- ^{1} French Land Register data, which excludes lakes, ponds, glaciers > 1 km^{2} (0.386 sq mi or 247 acres) and river estuaries.

Suzoy (French pronunciation: [syzwa]) is a commune in the Oise department in northern France.

== See also ==
- Communes of the Oise department
