= Halton =

Halton may refer to:

== Places ==
=== United Kingdom ===
- Borough of Halton, Cheshire
  - Halton (UK Parliament constituency)
  - Halton, Runcorn
- Halton, Buckinghamshire
  - RAF Halton
- Halton, Lancashire, a village
- Halton, Leeds, a suburb
- Halton, Northumberland, a village
- Halton East, North Yorkshire
- Halton Gill, North Yorkshire
- Halton Holegate, Lincolnshire
- Halton Lea Gate, Northumberland
- Halton West, North Yorkshire

=== Canada ===
- Halton (federal electoral district)
- Halton (provincial electoral district)
- Halton County, Ontario
- Halton Regional Municipality, Ontario

== Other uses ==
- Halton (barony)
- Halton (surname)
- Halton Arp (1927–2013), American astronomer
- Halton Jupiter, a 1970s British human-powered aircraft
- Halton sequence, a sequence of nearly uniformly distributed numbers that appear to be random
- Handley Page Halton, civil version of the Halifax bomber aircraft

== See also ==
- Halton Castle (disambiguation)
- Halton railway station (disambiguation)
