= Cartigny =

Cartigny may refer to several places:

- Cartigny, Somme, France
- Cartigny-l'Épinay, Calvados, France
- Cartigny, Switzerland

== See also ==
- Cantigny (disambiguation)
- Cartignies, Nord département, France
