= Babœuf =

- Commune
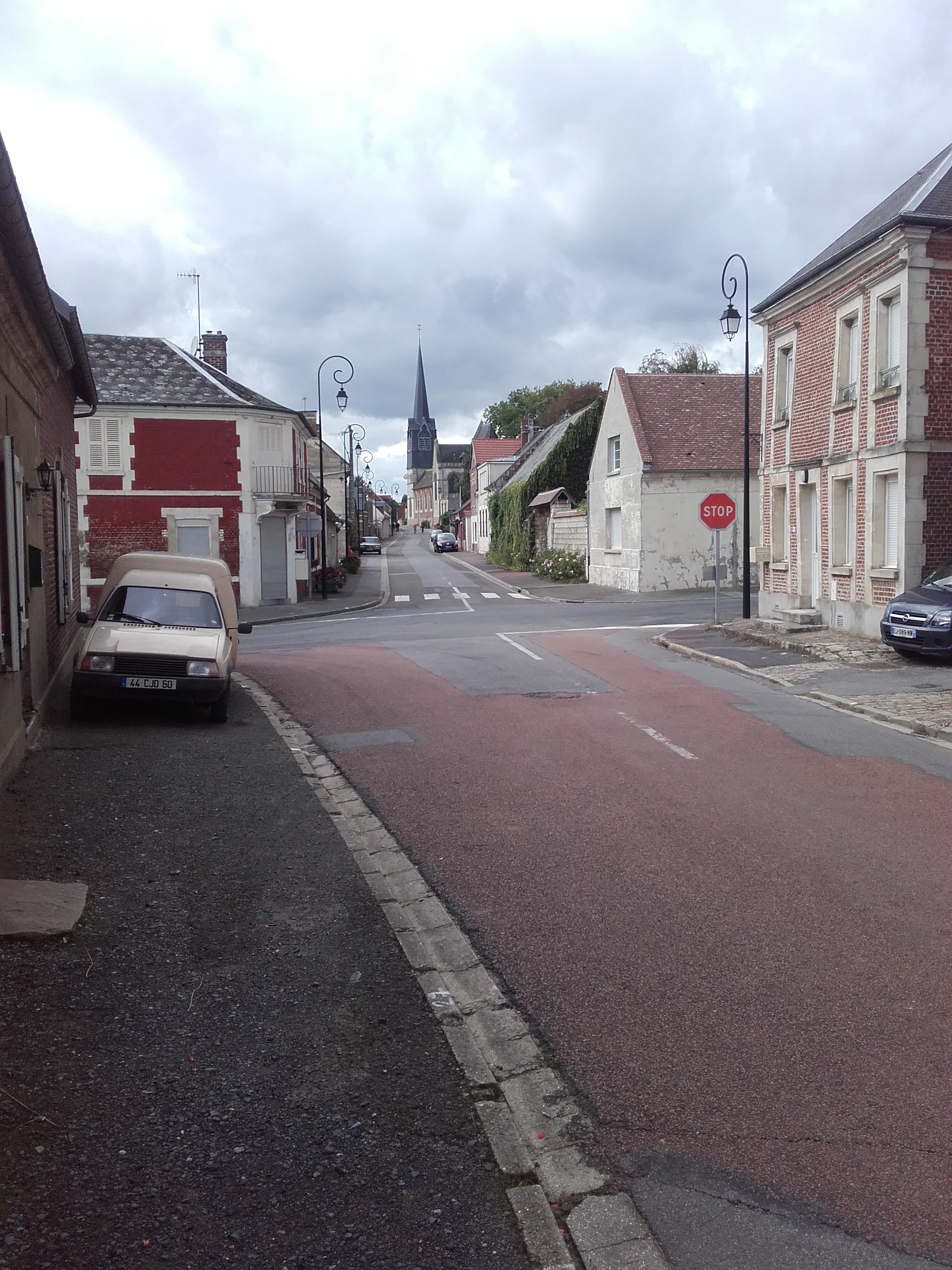
- The centre of Baboeuf
- Location of Babœuf
- Location within France Location within Hauts-de-France
- Coordinates: 49°35′22″N 3°05′07″E
- Country: France
- Region: Hauts-de-France
- Department: Oise
- Arrondissement: Compiègne
- Canton: Noyon
- Intercommunality: Pays Noyonnais

Government
  - Mayor (2021–2026): Marina Martins
- Area^{1}: 7.18 km^{2} (2.77 sq mi)
- Elevation: 66 m (217 ft)
- Highest elevation: 151 m (495 ft)
- Lowest elevation: 37 m (121 ft)
- Population (2023): 508
  - Density: 70.8/km^{2} (183/sq mi)
- Time zone: UTC+01:00 (CET)
  - Summer (DST): UTC+02:00 (CEST)
- INSEE/Postal code: 60037 /60400
- ^{1} French Land Register data, which excludes lakes, ponds, glaciers > 1 km^{2} (0.386 sq mi or 247 acres) and river estuaries.

Babœuf (French pronunciation: [babœf]) is a commune in the Oise department in northern France.

== Population ==
Historical population
Year	Pop.	±% p.a.
1968	412	—
1975	357	−2.03%
1982	510	+5.23%
1990	589	+1.82%
1999	532	−1.12%
2007	489	−1.05%
2012	531	+1.66%
2017	520	−0.42%
2023	508	−0.39%
Source: INSEE

== See also ==
- Communes of the Oise department
