= Béhéricourt =

- Commune
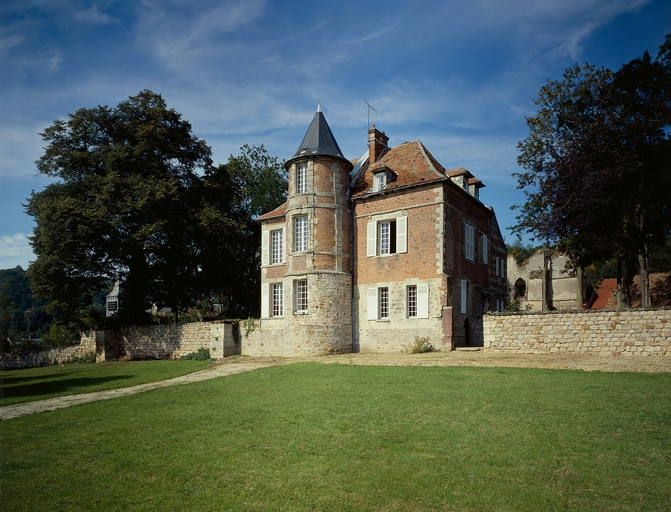
- The chateau in Béhéricourt
- Location of Béhéricourt
- Location within France Location within Hauts-de-France
- Coordinates: 49°35′49″N 3°03′58″E
- Country: France
- Region: Hauts-de-France
- Department: Oise
- Arrondissement: Compiègne
- Canton: Noyon
- Intercommunality: Pays Noyonnais

Government
  - Mayor (2020–2026): Céline Champagne
- Area^{1}: 5.3 km^{2} (2.0 sq mi)
- Elevation: 164 m (538 ft)
- Highest elevation: 178 m (584 ft)
- Lowest elevation: 37 m (121 ft)
- Population (2023): 192
  - Density: 36/km^{2} (94/sq mi)
- Time zone: UTC+01:00 (CET)
  - Summer (DST): UTC+02:00 (CEST)
- INSEE/Postal code: 60059 /60400
- ^{1} French Land Register data, which excludes lakes, ponds, glaciers > 1 km^{2} (0.386 sq mi or 247 acres) and river estuaries.

Béhéricourt (French pronunciation: [be.eʁikuʁ]) is a commune in the Oise department in northern France.

== Population ==
Historical population
Year	Pop.	±% p.a.
1968	164	—
1975	159	−0.44%
1982	179	+1.71%
1990	192	+0.88%
1999	208	+0.89%
2007	217	+0.53%
2012	215	−0.19%
2017	209	−0.56%
2023	192	−1.40%
Source: INSEE

== See also ==
- Communes of the Oise department
