= Vauchelles =

- Commune
- Location of Vauchelles
- Location within France Location within Hauts-de-France
- Coordinates: 49°35′16″N 2°57′54″E
- Country: France
- Region: Hauts-de-France
- Department: Oise
- Arrondissement: Compiègne
- Canton: Noyon
- Intercommunality: Pays Noyonnais

Government
  - Mayor (2020–2026): Daniel Fétré
- Area^{1}: 2.34 km^{2} (0.90 sq mi)
- Elevation: 54 m (177 ft)
- Highest elevation: 150 m (490 ft)
- Lowest elevation: 44 m (144 ft)
- Population (2023): 246
  - Density: 105/km^{2} (272/sq mi)
- Time zone: UTC+01:00 (CET)
  - Summer (DST): UTC+02:00 (CEST)
- INSEE/Postal code: 60657 /60400
- ^{1} French Land Register data, which excludes lakes, ponds, glaciers > 1 km^{2} (0.386 sq mi or 247 acres) and river estuaries.

Vauchelles (French pronunciation: [voʃɛl]) is a commune in the Oise department in northern France.

== See also ==
- Communes of the Oise department
