= Hallville =

Hallville may refer to:

- Hallville, a hamlet in North Dundas, Ontario, Canada
- Hallville Historic and Archeological District in Exeter, Rhode Island, United States
- Hallville Mill Historic District, in Preston, Connecticut, United States

== See also ==
- Hall (disambiguation)
- Ville (disambiguation)
- Hallsville (disambiguation)
