= Campagne, Oise =

Campagne
- Commune
- Location of Campagne
- Location within France Location within Hauts-de-France
- Coordinates: 49°38′48″N 2°57′43″E
- Country: France
- Region: Hauts-de-France
- Department: Oise
- Arrondissement: Compiègne
- Canton: Noyon
- Intercommunality: Pays Noyonnais

Government
  - Mayor (2020–2026): Jean-Luc Lavigne
- Area^{1}: 4.55 km^{2} (1.76 sq mi)
- Elevation: 70 m (230 ft)
- Highest elevation: 92 m (302 ft)
- Lowest elevation: 54 m (177 ft)
- Population (2023): 160
  - Density: 35/km^{2} (91/sq mi)
- Time zone: UTC+01:00 (CET)
  - Summer (DST): UTC+02:00 (CEST)
- INSEE/Postal code: 60121 /60640
- ^{1} French Land Register data, which excludes lakes, ponds, glaciers > 1 km^{2} (0.386 sq mi or 247 acres) and river estuaries.

Campagne (French pronunciation: [kɑ̃paɲ]) is a commune in the Oise department in northern France.

== See also ==
- Communes of the Oise department
