= Flavy-le-Meldeux =

- Commune
- Coat of arms
- Location of Flavy-le-Meldeux
- Location within France Location within Hauts-de-France
- Coordinates: 49°41′10″N 3°02′40″E
- Country: France
- Region: Hauts-de-France
- Department: Oise
- Arrondissement: Compiègne
- Canton: Noyon
- Intercommunality: Pays Noyonnais

Government
  - Mayor (2020–2026): David Bantigny
- Area^{1}: 3.15 km^{2} (1.22 sq mi)
- Elevation: 75 m (246 ft)
- Highest elevation: 95 m (312 ft)
- Lowest elevation: 65 m (213 ft)
- Population (2023): 225
  - Density: 71.4/km^{2} (185/sq mi)
- Time zone: UTC+01:00 (CET)
  - Summer (DST): UTC+02:00 (CEST)
- INSEE/Postal code: 60236 /60640
- ^{1} French Land Register data, which excludes lakes, ponds, glaciers > 1 km^{2} (0.386 sq mi or 247 acres) and river estuaries.

Flavy-le-Meldeux (French pronunciation: [flavi lə mɛldø]) is a commune in the Oise department in northern France.

== See also ==
- Communes of the Oise department
