= Halton Castle (disambiguation) =

Halton Castle is a castle in Runcorn, Cheshire.

Halton Castle may also refer to:

- Halton Castle, Lancashire
- Halton Castle, Northumberland
