= Halton railway station =

Halton railway station may refer to:

- Halton railway station (Cheshire), on the Birkenhead Joint Railway
- Halton railway station (Lancashire), on the Midland Railway's "Little" North Western Railway
