= Maucourt, Oise =

Maucourt
- Commune
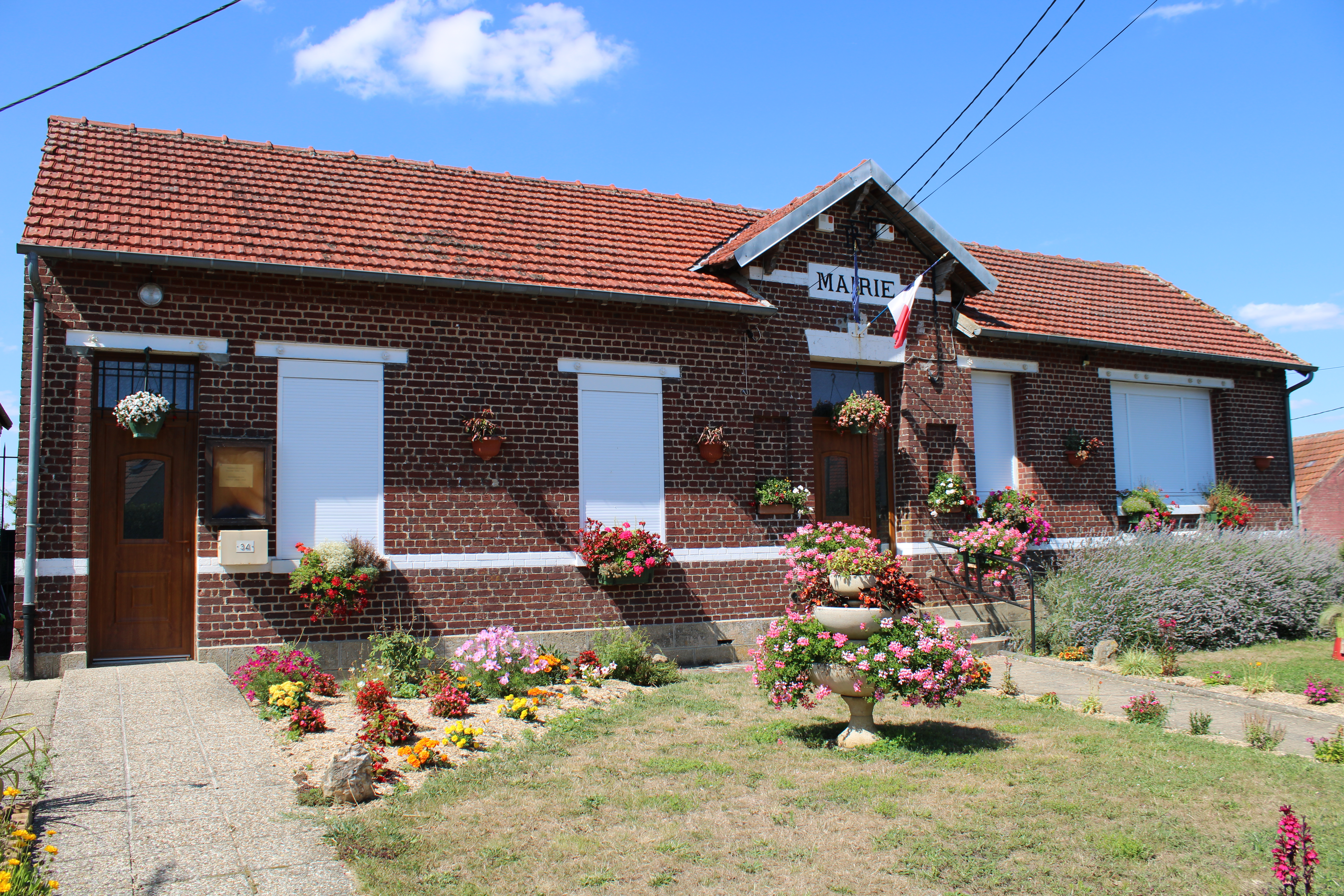
- Maucourt Town hall
- Location of Maucourt
- Location within France Location within Hauts-de-France
- Coordinates: 49°38′13″N 3°04′30″E
- Country: France
- Region: Hauts-de-France
- Department: Oise
- Arrondissement: Compiègne
- Canton: Noyon
- Intercommunality: Pays Noyonnais

Government
  - Mayor (2020–2026): Fabrice Foucher
- Area^{1}: 3.12 km^{2} (1.20 sq mi)
- Elevation: 80 m (260 ft)
- Highest elevation: 180 m (590 ft)
- Lowest elevation: 69 m (226 ft)
- Population (2023): 221
  - Density: 70.8/km^{2} (183/sq mi)
- Time zone: UTC+01:00 (CET)
  - Summer (DST): UTC+02:00 (CEST)
- INSEE/Postal code: 60389 /60640
- ^{1} French Land Register data, which excludes lakes, ponds, glaciers > 1 km^{2} (0.386 sq mi or 247 acres) and river estuaries.

Maucourt (French pronunciation: [mokuʁ]) is a commune in the Oise department in northern France.

== See also ==
- Communes of the Oise department
