= Ville, Oise =

Ville
- Commune
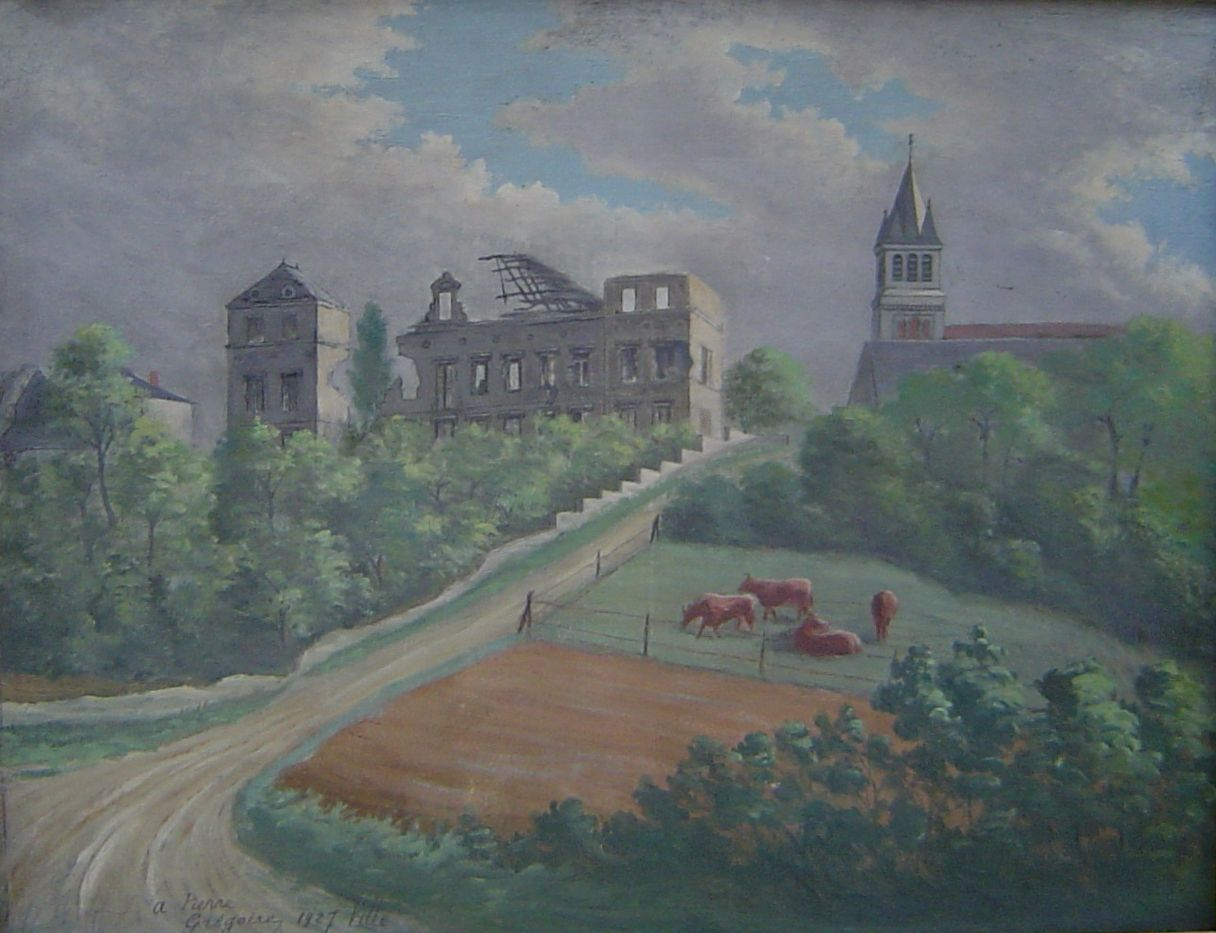
- The château in disrepair painted by Général Léon Grégoire in 1927
- Location of Ville
- Location within France Location within Hauts-de-France
- Coordinates: 49°33′18″N 2°56′26″E
- Country: France
- Region: Hauts-de-France
- Department: Oise
- Arrondissement: Senlis
- Canton: Noyon
- Intercommunality: Pays Noyonnais

Government
  - Mayor (2020–2026): Philippe Barbillon
- Area^{1}: 6.04 km^{2} (2.33 sq mi)
- Highest elevation: 164 m (538 ft)
- Lowest elevation: 41 m (135 ft)
- Population (2023): 741
  - Density: 123/km^{2} (318/sq mi)
- Time zone: UTC+01:00 (CET)
  - Summer (DST): UTC+02:00 (CEST)
- INSEE/Postal code: 60676 /60400
- ^{1} French Land Register data, which excludes lakes, ponds, glaciers > 1 km^{2} (0.386 sq mi or 247 acres) and river estuaries.

Ville (French pronunciation: [vil]) is a commune in the Oise department in the region of Hauts-de-France in northern France. The village is divided into a northern part and a southern part by the river Divette.

== Demographics ==
Historical population
Year	Pop.	±% p.a.
1968	495	—
1975	555	+1.65%
1982	552	−0.08%
1990	613	+1.32%
1999	675	+1.08%
2007	767	+1.61%
2012	776	+0.23%
2017	762	−0.36%
2023	741	−0.46%
Source: INSEE

== The château ==
The first castle stood at a place later known as Le Vieux Château (The Old Castle) near the junction of Rue du Château and Rue de l'Archerie. By the early 19th century the castle was in ruins and in 1840 it was replaced by a new château comprising a main building and two symmetrical wings situated just to the north east of the village church. This building was partially destroyed during the First World War and rebuilt on the old plans in the late 1920s.

== See also ==
- Communes of the Oise department
