= Catigny =

- Commune
- Location of Catigny
- Location within France Location within Hauts-de-France
- Coordinates: 49°38′20″N 2°56′20″E
- Country: France
- Region: Hauts-de-France
- Department: Oise
- Arrondissement: Compiègne
- Canton: Noyon
- Intercommunality: Pays Noyonnais

Government
  - Mayor (2020–2026): Valérie Opat
- Area^{1}: 6.68 km^{2} (2.58 sq mi)
- Elevation: 67 m (220 ft)
- Highest elevation: 87 m (285 ft)
- Lowest elevation: 45 m (148 ft)
- Population (2023): 176
  - Density: 26.3/km^{2} (68.2/sq mi)
- Time zone: UTC+01:00 (CET)
  - Summer (DST): UTC+02:00 (CEST)
- INSEE/Postal code: 60132 /60640
- ^{1} French Land Register data, which excludes lakes, ponds, glaciers > 1 km^{2} (0.386 sq mi or 247 acres) and river estuaries.

Catigny (French pronunciation: [katiɲi]) is a commune in the Oise department in northern France.

== See also ==
- Communes of the Oise department
