= Hallsville High School =

Hallsville High School may refer to:

- Hallsville High School (Missouri) in Hallsville, Missouri
- Hallsville High School (Texas) in Hallsville, Texas
