= Ville (disambiguation) =

Ville is a French word and English suffix meaning "city" or "town".

Ville may also refer to:

== People ==
- Ville (given name), a Finnish and Swedish male given name
- Ville Kallio, a Finnish multimedia artist and game designer

== Places ==
- Ville, Oise, a commune in northern France
- Villé, a commune in the Bas-Rhin department in north-eastern France
- Ville (Germany), a range of hills in the Lower Rhine Bay in western Germany
- The Ville, St. Louis, a historic neighborhood in North St. Louis
- The 'Ville, a nickname for Louisville, Kentucky
- The Ville, a nickname for Somerville College, Oxford, United Kingdom

== Other uses ==
- The Ville (video game), 2012 video game

== See also ==
- Deville (disambiguation)
