= Fréniches =

- Commune
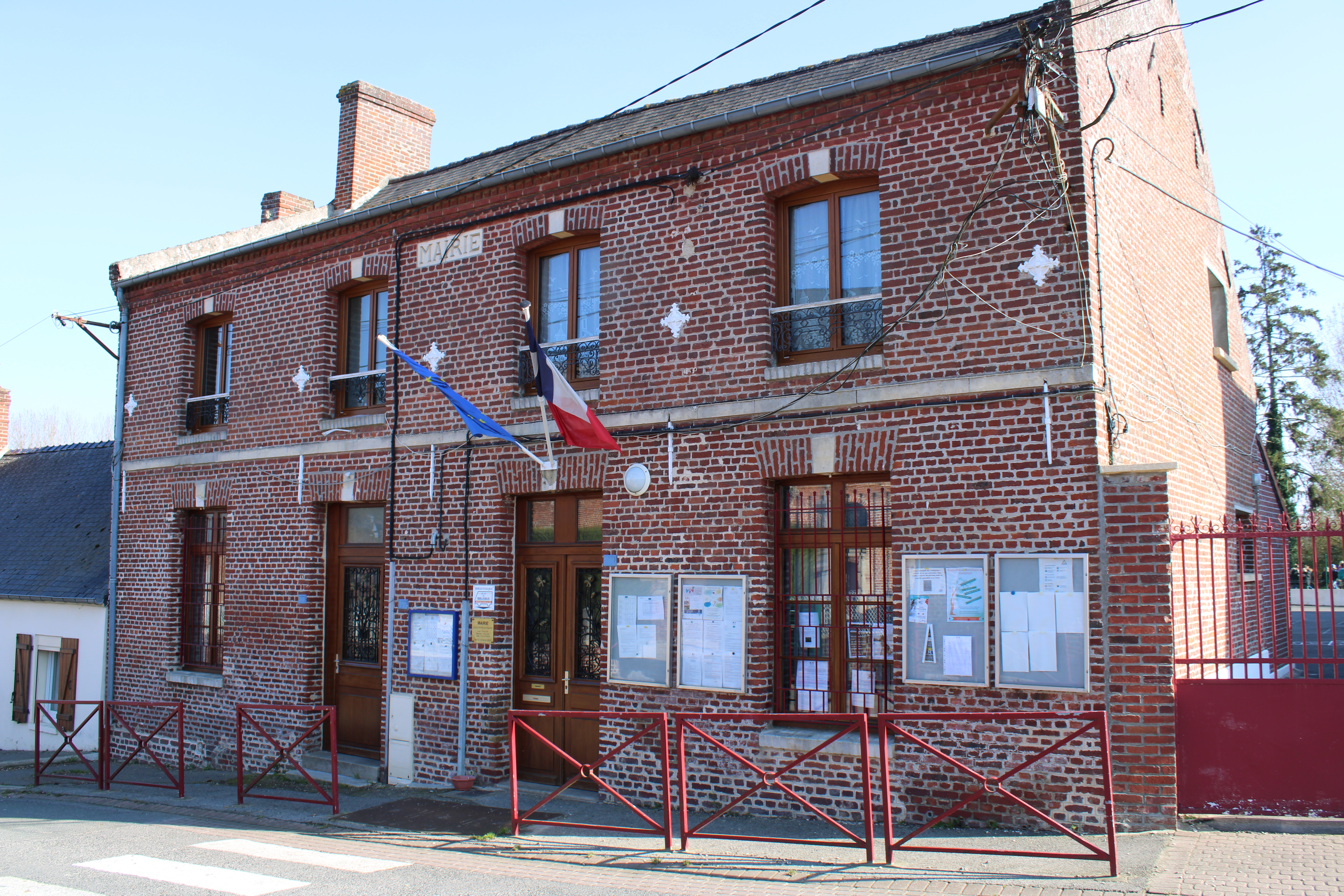
- Fréniches Town hall
- Location of Fréniches
- Location within France Location within Hauts-de-France
- Coordinates: 49°40′19″N 3°00′17″E
- Country: France
- Region: Hauts-de-France
- Department: Oise
- Arrondissement: Compiègne
- Canton: Noyon
- Intercommunality: Pays Noyonnais

Government
  - Mayor (2020–2026): Christophe Doisy
- Area^{1}: 5.96 km^{2} (2.30 sq mi)
- Elevation: 91 m (299 ft)
- Highest elevation: 110 m (360 ft)
- Lowest elevation: 69 m (226 ft)
- Population (2023): 323
  - Density: 54.2/km^{2} (140/sq mi)
- Time zone: UTC+01:00 (CET)
  - Summer (DST): UTC+02:00 (CEST)
- INSEE/Postal code: 60255 /60640
- ^{1} French Land Register data, which excludes lakes, ponds, glaciers > 1 km^{2} (0.386 sq mi or 247 acres) and river estuaries.

Fréniches (French pronunciation: [fʁeniʃ]) is a commune in the Oise department in northern France.

== See also ==
- Communes of the Oise department
