= Berlancourt, Oise =

Berlancourt
- Commune
- Location of Berlancourt
- Location within France Location within Hauts-de-France
- Coordinates: 49°40′19″N 3°04′11″E
- Country: France
- Region: Hauts-de-France
- Department: Oise
- Arrondissement: Compiègne
- Canton: Noyon
- Intercommunality: Pays Noyonnais

Government
  - Mayor (2020–2026): Joël Cottart
- Area^{1}: 7.12 km^{2} (2.75 sq mi)
- Elevation: 89 m (292 ft)
- Highest elevation: 102 m (335 ft)
- Lowest elevation: 62 m (203 ft)
- Population (2023): 310
  - Density: 44/km^{2} (110/sq mi)
- Time zone: UTC+01:00 (CET)
  - Summer (DST): UTC+02:00 (CEST)
- INSEE/Postal code: 60062 /60640
- ^{1} French Land Register data, which excludes lakes, ponds, glaciers > 1 km^{2} (0.386 sq mi or 247 acres) and river estuaries.

Berlancourt (French pronunciation: [bɛʁlɑ̃kuʁ]) is a commune in the Oise department in northern France

== Population ==
Historical population
Year	Pop.	±% p.a.
1968	179	—
1975	156	−1.95%
1982	185	+2.47%
1990	245	+3.57%
1999	283	+1.61%
2007	307	+1.02%
2012	336	+1.82%
2017	331	−0.30%
2023	310	−1.09%
Source: INSEE

== See also ==
- Communes of the Oise department
