= Frétoy-le-Château =

- Commune
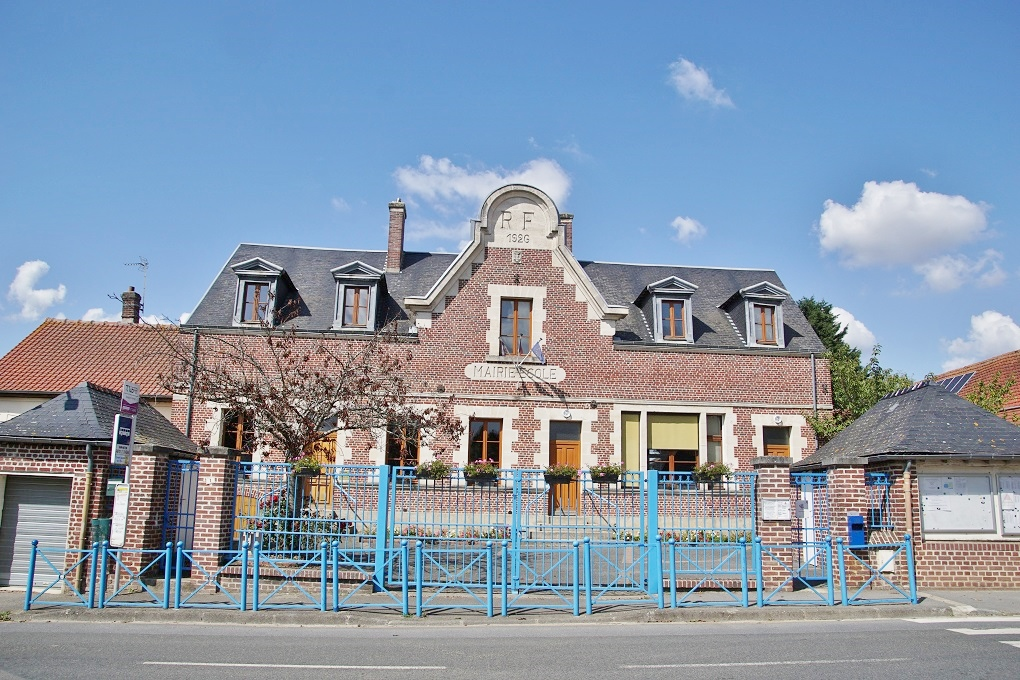
- The town hall in Frétoy-le-Château
- Location of Frétoy-le-Château
- Location within France Location within Hauts-de-France
- Coordinates: 49°39′43″N 2°58′55″E
- Country: France
- Region: Hauts-de-France
- Department: Oise
- Arrondissement: Compiègne
- Canton: Noyon
- Intercommunality: Pays Noyonnais

Government
  - Mayor (2020–2026): Jean-Pierre Boileau
- Area^{1}: 5.01 km^{2} (1.93 sq mi)
- Elevation: 70 m (230 ft)
- Highest elevation: 107 m (351 ft)
- Lowest elevation: 60 m (200 ft)
- Population (2023): 264
  - Density: 52.7/km^{2} (136/sq mi)
- Time zone: UTC+01:00 (CET)
  - Summer (DST): UTC+02:00 (CEST)
- INSEE/Postal code: 60263 /60640
- ^{1} French Land Register data, which excludes lakes, ponds, glaciers > 1 km^{2} (0.386 sq mi or 247 acres) and river estuaries.

Frétoy-le-Château (French pronunciation: [fʁetwa lə ʃato]) is a commune in the Oise department in northern France.

== See also ==
- Communes of the Oise department
