= Mary Halton =

American gynecologist

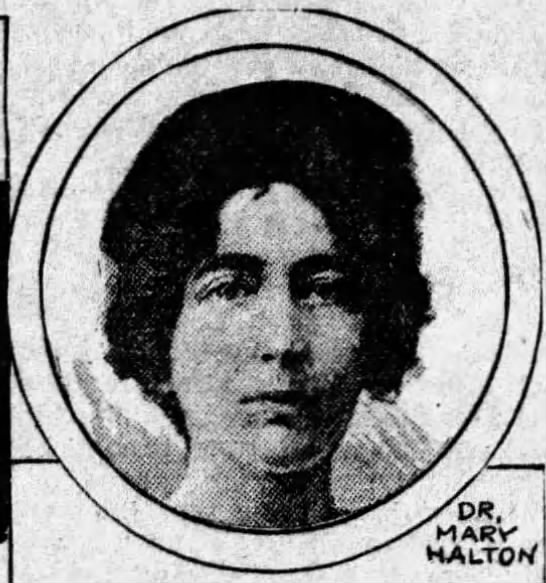
- Born: Mary Gertrude Halton; 1878; San Francisco, California, US
- Died: January 25, 1948 (aged 69–70); New York City, New York, US
- Education: Stanford University
- Medical career
- Profession: medical doctor
- Field: Gynecology

Mary Gertrude Halton (1878–1948) was an American pathologist, gynecologist, obstetrician, women's health activist, and suffragist. She fought to publish research on early intrauterine device (IUD) technology, in order to further the legalization of birth control in the United States. She was the first women appointed to the Harvard Medical School faculty.

== Early life and education ==
Mary G. Halton was born in 1878 in San Francisco, California, she was the daughter of Mary Gunn Halton and Dr. Richard J. Halton. Her father was born in Dublin, Ireland. She attended the University of California, and later Stanford University's Cooper Medical College, graduating on June 5, 1900, with her medical degree.

== Career ==
After graduation she worked as a pathologist at Saint Francis Memorial Hospital, St. Luke's Hospital, and Southern Pacific Hospital in San Francisco. By 1906, she had moved to New York City and started her own medical practice. In New York City, Halton joined the suffragist movement and became a feminist leader.

Starting in 1910, Halton worked as the Medical School Inspector for the New York City Department of Health. She also worked at the Gouverneur Hospital as a surgeon in the outpatient maternity ward. Halton became famous in 1923, when she was able to use an X-ray machine in order to shrink an enlarged gland on a three-day-old baby, and as a result she saved the baby's life.

In 1921, Halton shared with her friend Margaret Sanger, a birth control activist, Halton's two-year research with 700 women implanted with an intrauterine coil made of either silver or gold which had very few side effects. A similar process was being done in Germany at the time. Sanger restrained due to public criticism and warned against the IUD coils in the book, Happiness in Marriage (1926). Halton continued her work and began testing silk IUD coils in a trial of nearly 270 women. The study found the silk coil to be an effective method of contraception. However, Halton's findings were rejected for publication in 1947 by the American Journal of Obstetrics and Gynecology for being controversial. The research article was published a year later with a warning, in the Human Fertility journal by Margaret Sanger. By 1963, the medical community began to accept the IUD and related procedures.

Halton lectured publicly on domestic life, as well as published various newspaper articles, she was opposed to the Volstead Act, and was a member of the Anti-Noise Society of New York City. By 1913, Halton served as the leader of the 29th District Assembly's Woman Suffrage Party. In 1915, Halton wrote a letter to the editor of The New York Times, in support of the suffragist movement. She founded the Halton Endowment for Girls, Inc, which helped place low income "working girls" into beds in New York City for when they couldn't afford medical treatment.

Halton was the president of the Equal Rights For Babies, Inc. where she led a movement to insure the New York State Legislature pass a 1935 bill for birth certificates to not disclose parents names. Prior to the bill, only the father's name was omitted, which caused stigma for a child born out of wedlock as they grew older. By the time of her death, fourteen states had changed their laws around birth certificates and parents names, in order to protect babies born out of wedlock.

== Death ==
Halton died after a long illness on January 25, 1948, at Doctor's Hospital in Staten Island in New York City, she was 69 years old. After her death, the Equal Rights For Babies fund was diverted into the Dr. Mary Halton Student Loan Fund at NYU–Bellevue Medical Center to help more women study medicine.
