= Maurice Deville =

Luxembourgish footballer (born 1992)

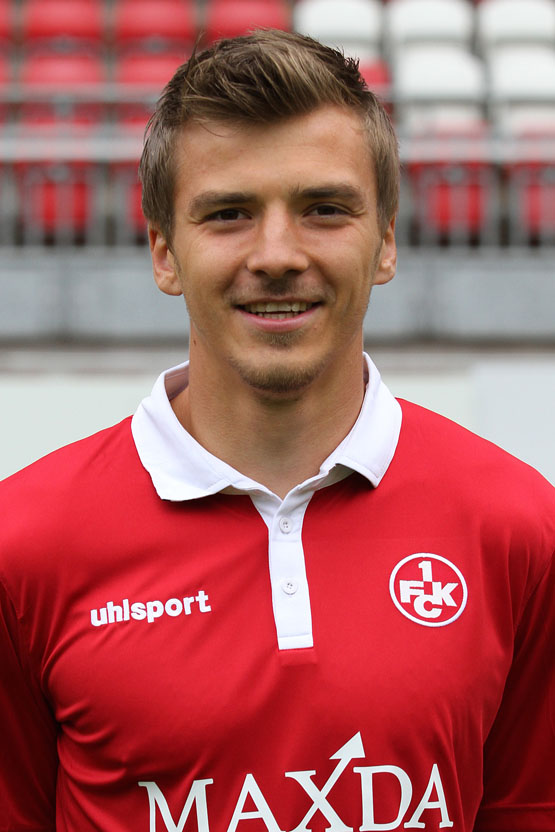
- Deville with 1. FC Kaiserslautern in 2015

Personal information
- Full name: Maurice John Deville
- Date of birth: 31 July 1992 (age 34)
- Place of birth: Sulingen, Germany
- Height: 1.94 m (6 ft 4 in)
- Position: Forward

Team information
- Current team: Jeunesse Canach
- Number: 14

Youth career
- –2007: Swift Hesperange
- 2007–2008: SC Uckerath

Senior career*
Years	Team	Apps	(Gls)
2008–2011	Alemannia Aachen II	44	(11)
2011–2013	SV Elversberg	61	(17)
2013–2014	1. FC Saarbrücken	12	(2)
2014–2017	1. FC Kaiserslautern II	28	(5)
2015–2017	1. FC Kaiserslautern	17	(4)
2016–2017	→ FSV Frankfurt (loan)	13	(2)
2017–2020	Waldhof Mannheim	88	(15)
2020–2022	1. FC Saarbrücken	39	(7)
2022	SV Sandhausen	12	(0)
2022–2024	Swift Hesperange	32	(1)
2025	Schalke 04 II	11	(1)
2025–	Jeunesse Canach	18	(4)

International career
- Luxembourg U17
- Luxembourg U19
- Luxembourg U21
2011–2022	Luxembourg	61	(3)
- * Club domestic league appearances and goals as of 5 June 2026

Maurice John Deville (born 31 July 1992) is a Luxembourgish professional footballer who plays as a forward for Jeunesse Canach.

== Early life ==
Maurice Deville was born in 1992 in Sulingen, the son of a German mother and Luxembourg footballer Frank Deville. His parents later separated.

== Career ==
Deville has played club football in Germany for Alemannia Aachen II, SV Elversberg and 1. FC Saarbrücken.

He made his senior international debut for Luxembourg in 2011, and has also appeared in qualifying matches for the UEFA European Under-21 Football Championship.

In July 2014, he joined 1. FC Kaiserslautern to play for the U23 team, but a year later he was promoted to the first team and signed a professional contract in February 2016.

In August 2016, he went on loan to FSV Frankfurt until summer 2017.

He returned to Saarbrücken in August 2020.

On 24 August 2022, Deville returned to his childhood club Swift Hesperange.

On 31 January 2025, Deville signed with Schalke 04 II.

== Career statistics ==
=== International ===
Appearances and goals by national team and year
National team	Year	Apps	Goals
Luxembourg
Luxembourg	2011	1	0
Luxembourg	2012	8	2
Luxembourg	2013	4	1
Luxembourg	2014	5	0
Luxembourg	2015	8	0
Luxembourg	2016	6	0
Luxembourg	2017	2	0
Luxembourg	2018	3	0
Luxembourg	2019	4	0
Luxembourg	2020	6	0
Luxembourg	2021	12	0
Luxembourg	2022	2	0
Total		61	3

Scores and results list Luxembourg's goal tally first, score column indicates score after each Deville goal.

List of international goals scored by Maurice Deville
No.	Date	Venue	Opponent	Score	Result	Competition	Ref.
1	29 February 2012	Josy Barthel Stadium, Luxembourg City, Luxembourg	Macedonia	1–1	2–1	Friendly	
2	29 February 2012	Josy Barthel Stadium, Luxembourg City, Luxembourg	Macedonia	2–1	2–1	Friendly	
3	17 November 2013	Josy Barthel Stadium, Luxembourg City, Luxembourg	Montenegro	1–2	1–4	Friendly	
