= Frank Deville =

Luxembourgish former footballer

Personal information
- Date of birth: 12 August 1970 (age 56)
- Place of birth: Luxembourg
- Position: Midfielder

Senior career*
Years	Team	Apps	(Gls)
1987–1992	Swift Hesperange	128	(14)
1992–1995	Union Luxembourg	71	(10)
1995–1996	Union Berlin	5	(0)
1996–1997	1. FC Saarbrücken	16	(0)
1997–1998	SV Mettlach		
1998–1999	Avenir Beggen	20	(0)
1999–2002	FC Mondercange	68	(2)
2002–2003	F91 Dudelange	2	(0)

International career
1995–2002	Luxembourg	35	(0)
- * Club domestic league appearances and goals

Frank Deville (born 12 August 1970) is a Luxembourgish former professional footballer who played as a midfielder. He was a member of the Luxembourg national football team from 1995 to 2002.

His son is Maurice Deville.
