= Forest of Compiègne =

Large forest in the region of Picardy, France

Forest of Compiègne French: Forêt de Compiègne
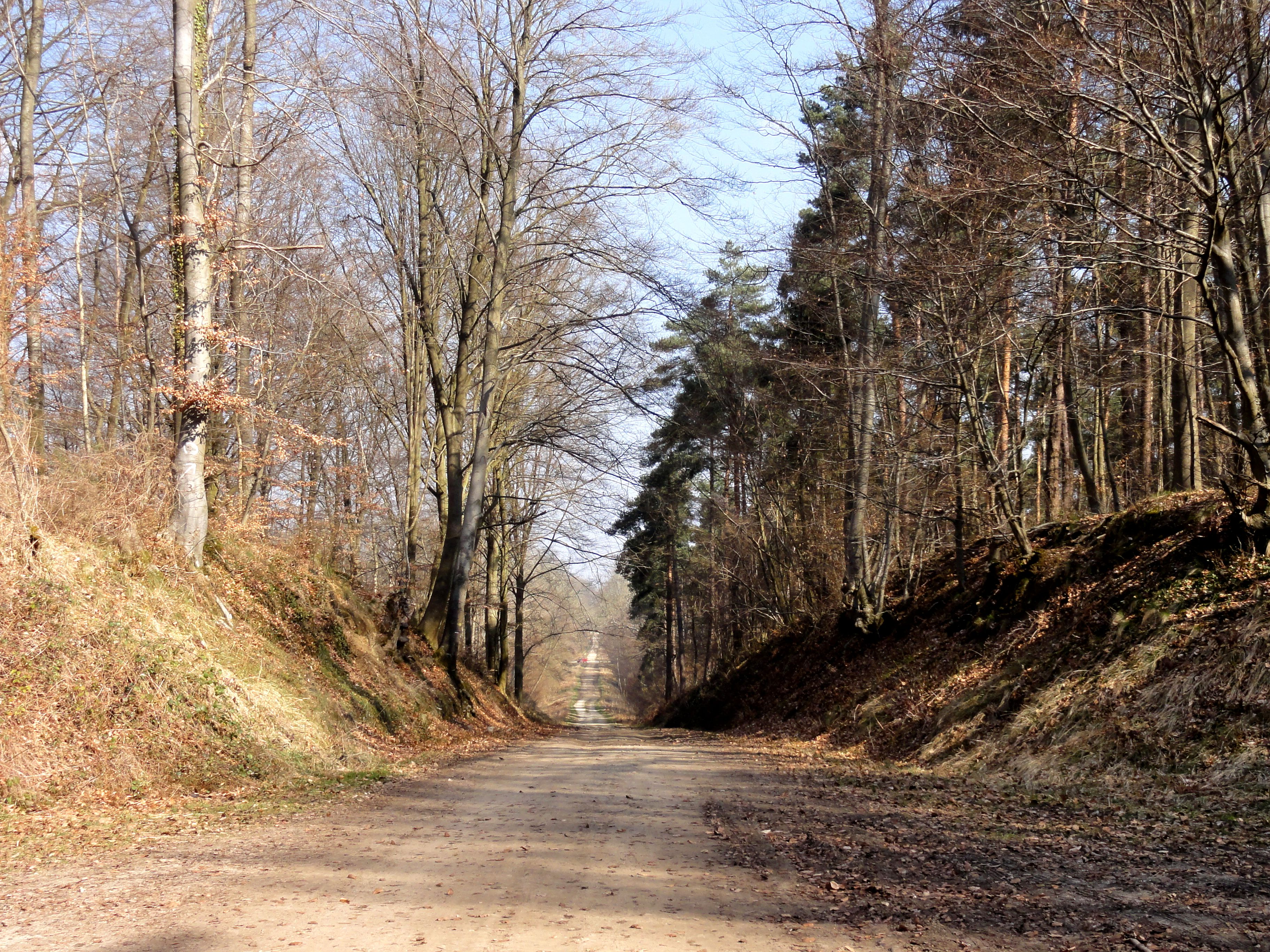
- Saint-Jean-aux-Bois within the Forest of Compiègne

- Location within France

Geography
- Location: Compiègne, Oise, France
- Coordinates: 49°22′48″N 2°53′00″E
- Elevation: 30 to 148 metres (98 to 486 ft)
- Area: 14,414 hectares (35,620 acres)

Administration
- Status: Protected under Natura 2000 and Site of Community Importance
- Events: Armistice with Germany (WWI); Armistice with France (WWII)
- Authority: National Forests Office (France)

Ecology
- Dominant tree species: Oak, Beech

The Forest of Compiègne (French: Forêt de Compiègne, pronounced [fɔʁɛ də kɔ̃pjɛɲ]) is a large forest in the region of Picardy in France, near the city of Compiègne and approximately 80 kilometres (50 mi) north of Paris.

The forest is notable as the site of the Armistice of 11 November 1918 between the Allies and Germany which marked the end of fighting in World War I, as well as the Armistice of 22 June 1940 after the Battle of France in World War II.

== Geography ==
The forest of Compiègne is roughly circular with a diameter of about 14 kilometres (9 miles); it is approximately 93 kilometres (58 miles) in circumference and its area is roughly 14,414 hectares (35,620 acres). The forest is lushly irrigated, being adjacent to the rivers Oise and Aisne, as well as many smaller tributaries and streams.

On its northwest, the forest hugs its small namesake city, and to its north and northeast, beyond the Aisne, lies the large national forest of Laigue (Forêt Domaniale de Laigue). Around its remaining perimeter, it contains or is adjacent to numerous communes including Vieux-Moulin, Lacroix-Saint-Ouen, Saint-Sauveur, Béthisy-Saint-Pierre, Saint-Jean-aux-Bois, and Pierrefonds. On its south it borders the Forest of Halatte.

Just outside the city of Compiègne, a grand entrance to the forest begins at the Château de Compiègne, a former royal residence on the city's western edge. Stretching forward from the château, the Avenue de Beaux Monts scales the heights of the same name, providing a scenic promenade into the woods.

== Characteristics ==
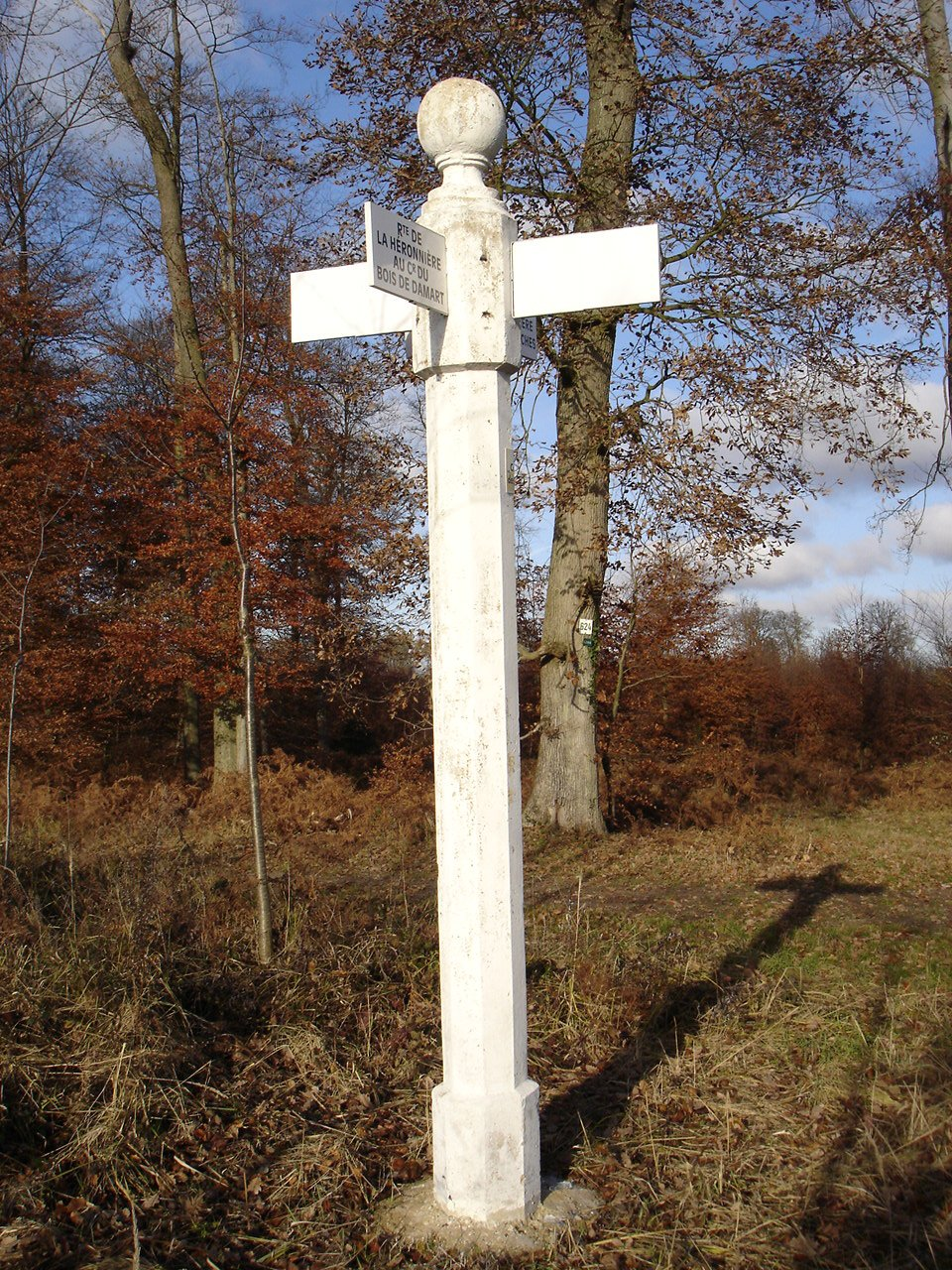
Signpost in the Compiègne forest

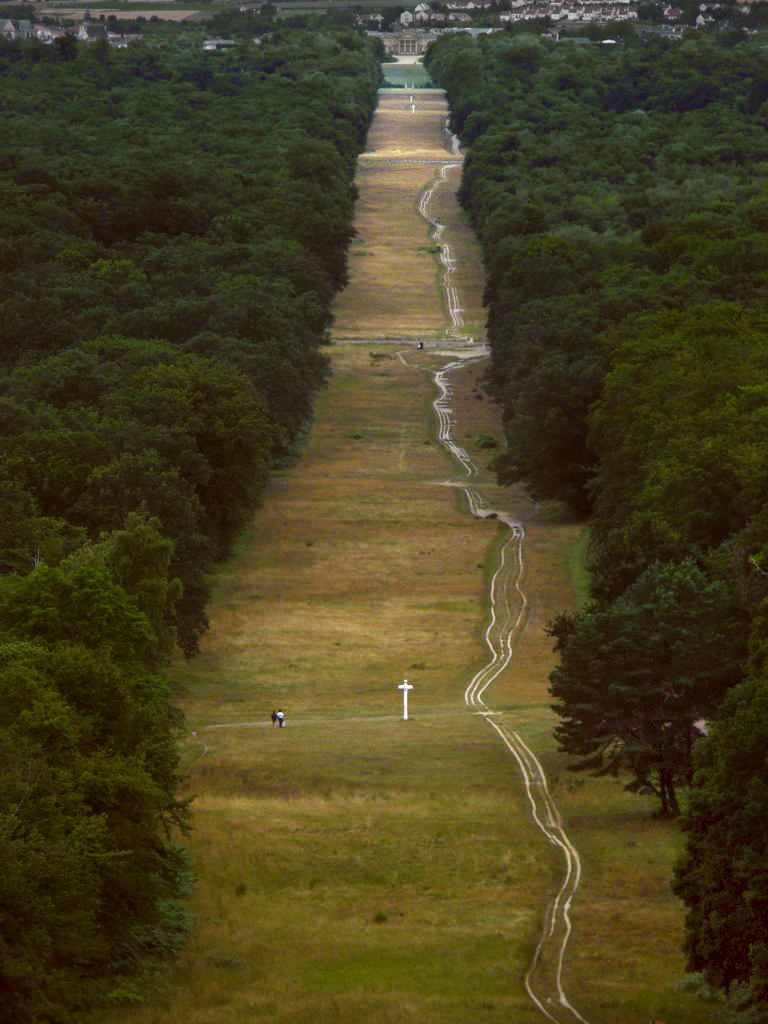
Avenue de Beaux Monts, the promenade into the forest from the Château de Compiègne

The forest of Compiègne is noted for its natural features, and was described in an 1893 Littell's Living Age account as having a "noble and ordered beauty".

The most prominent tree species are oak (Quercus robur), beech (Fagus sylvatica) and hornbeam (Carpinus betulus). Much of the oak was heavily harvested over the centuries but was replanted aggressively in the nineteenth century when fears of deforestation began to be addressed. Since the late twentieth century, the North American black cherry tree (Prunus serotina) has spread vigorously throughout the forest, eliciting mixed reactions from local arborists.

Numerous flowering plants thrive in the woods, notably large numbers of Lily of the Valley (Convallaria majalis). Small lakes, ponds, brooks and springs abound throughout the forest, including the Spring of Saint-Sauveur, which is actually a pair of therapeutic mineral water springs running both hot and cold.

The forest sustains a great number of game animals including deer, rabbit and wild boar, and the varied terrain – plateaus cut by valleys and gorges, hills, streams and ponds, creates a complex hunting setting. For centuries the Compiègne forest has been a popular hunting ground for virtually all the kings of France. Some 350 roads and pathways cross it adding up to over six hundred miles of trail with stately vintage signposts marking most of the intersections. The oldest ones include a small red mark which shows the direction to the château, relics of an imperial order given during the Second French Empire after the Empress Eugénie found herself lost in the thick woods.

The forest of Compiègne is a popular destination for all types of tourists. Horse-riders and bicyclists particularly enjoy the forest; a long-running bicycle event, the Paris-Roubaix race, has an established path through the forest.

== History ==
=== Prehistoric and classical eras ===
The forest of Compiègne area shows evidence of prehistoric habitation, and continuous forest cover has been definitively proven since at least the end of the Roman Empire. Gallic-Roman edifices have been discovered there, and it is traversed on its south and east sides by an ancient Roman road now called by the French the Chaussée Brunehaut. During the Gallic Wars, Julius Caesar won a decisive victory in the forest, defeating one of the larger tribes of north-eastern Gaul, the Bellovaci. A multitude of the forest's classical-era artifacts are on display at the Château's museum.

=== Early Middle Ages ===
The earliest Frankish kings established the forest as their privileged hunting grounds, and Clothaire the Great built the first royal residence there in the 7th century, and there he died of a fever. The small palace, fitted cozily among the trees, was named Cusia and for some time thereafter the forest itself went by the name Forêt de Cuise that is memorialized in the village of Cuise-la-Motte that lies to the east of the forest boundaries. A battle between the Merovingian-era kingdoms of Austrasia and Neustria took place in the forest in the year 715.

=== Later Middle Ages ===
As Empress Eugénie's signposts attest, the thick and heavy forest can be a disorienting and potentially fatal place. In the twelfth century, at the age of fourteen, the future King Philip II of France found himself lost in the forest: he came so close to tragedy that his father, Louis VII, felt compelled to make a pilgrimage to the shrine of St. Thomas of Canterbury in England to offer thanks for his recovery. In the sixteenth century, King Francis I commanded the construction of eight hard-surfaced roads through the forest, all of which converge on a single point called the King's Well (Puits du Roi).

=== Early modern era ===
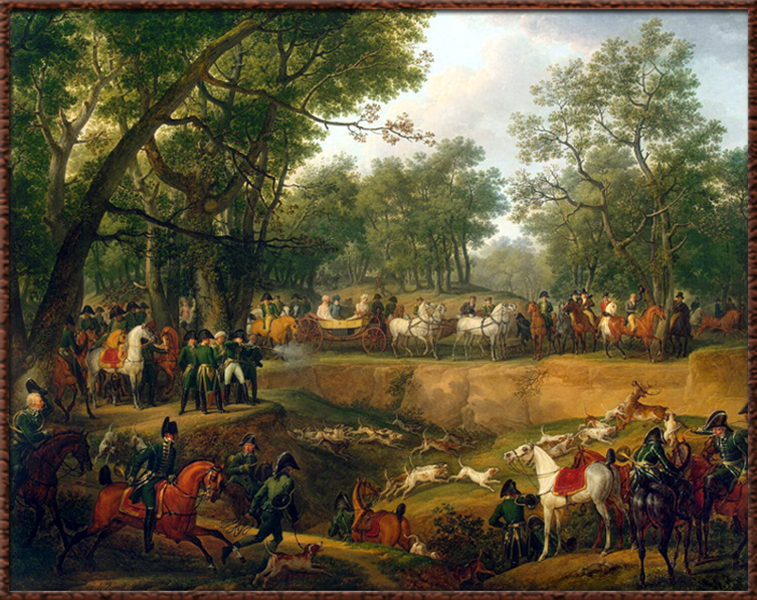
Most French monarchs enjoyed extravagant hunts at Compiègne. This 1811 oil painting by Carle Vernet depicts the Emperor Napoleon at his sport.

Further avenues connected by an octagonal ring were opened through the woods for the formal hunting parties of Louis XIV, and under the Ancien Régime the number of rides was increased to 200. Napoleon opened the avenue of Beaux-Monts (illustration). Prior to the Industrial Revolution, the lush woodlands provided lumber for a thriving woodworking community around Compiègne. One of the most popular products supplied by the forest was beech oil, used for cooking and folk medicines: it was bottled in prodigious quantities and sold worldwide from Compiègne through the 19th century, until its marketshare was supplanted by newer, more refined oils.

=== Second Empire ===
During the reign of the Emperor Napoleon III, the forest of Compiègne was frequently used for imperial retreats and hunting events. Napoleon III re-established the forest as hunting grounds and revived the position of Grand Veneur to oversee management. Hunting gatherings were often organized at the King's Well, and the site host to social receptions, gatherings, and theatrical performances.

=== Armistices of 1918 and 1940 ===
The forest of Compiègne was the site of the Armistice between the Allies and Germany which marked the end of fighting in World War I on 11 November 1918. The French commander-in-chief Marshal Foch convened the armistice talks deep in the forest beside the tiny village of Rethondes, with an eye towards secrecy because he wanted to shield the meeting from intrusive journalists, as well as spare the German delegation any hostile demonstrations by French locals.

During World War II, a second treaty was signed in the forest, this time arranging the Armistice between France and Nazi Germany (22 June 1940). With an unmistakable desire to humiliate his defeated enemy, German dictator Adolf Hitler gave orders that the surrender should be received in exactly the same spot, even the same railway car, where the Germans had surrendered in 1918.

Images of the armistices

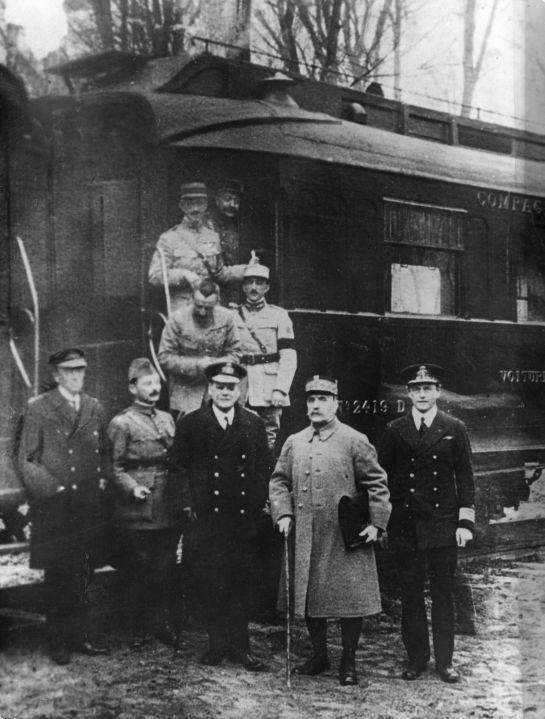
Ferdinand Foch outside the armistice train.

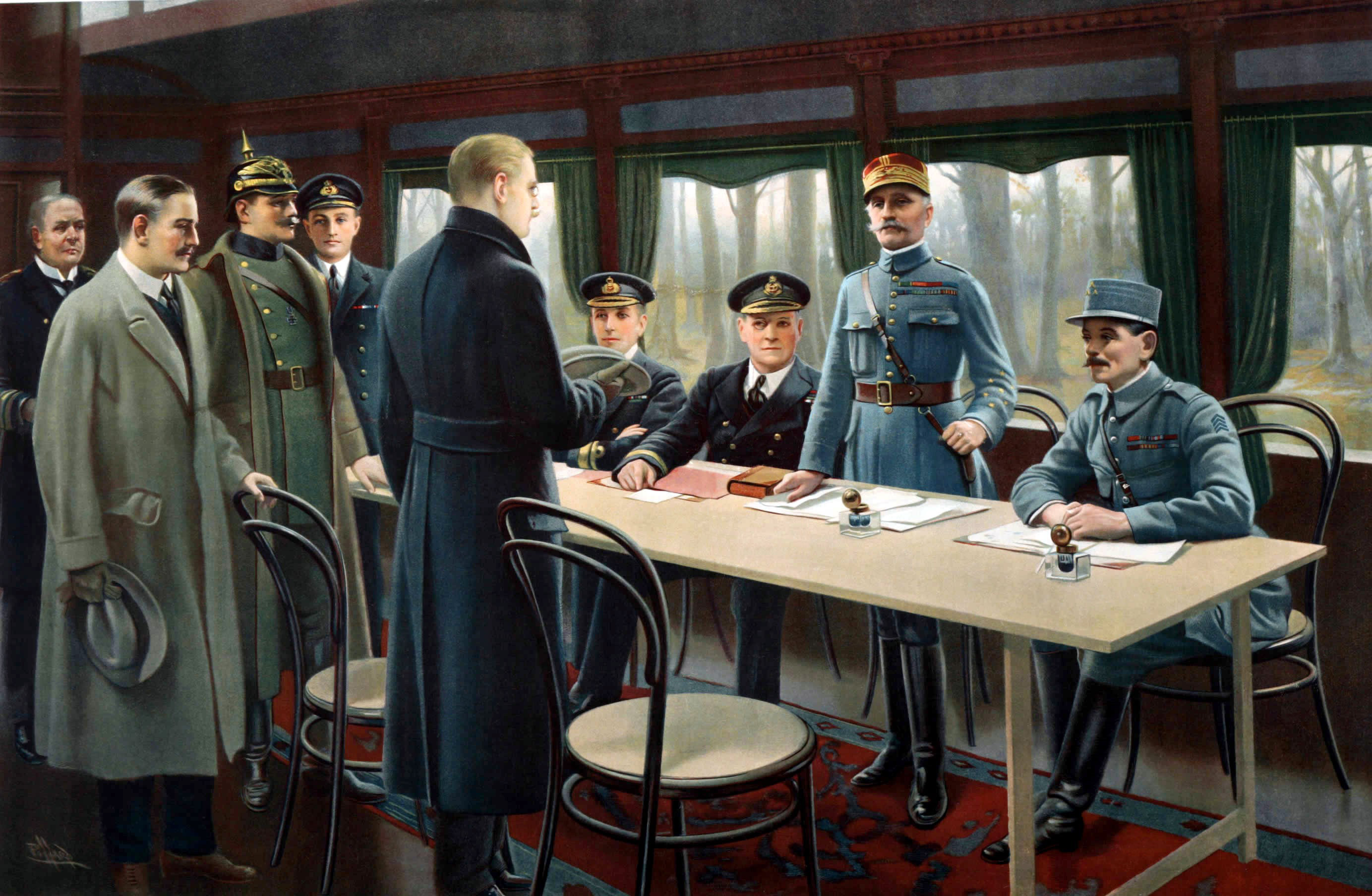
The Great War concludes, 11 November 1918.

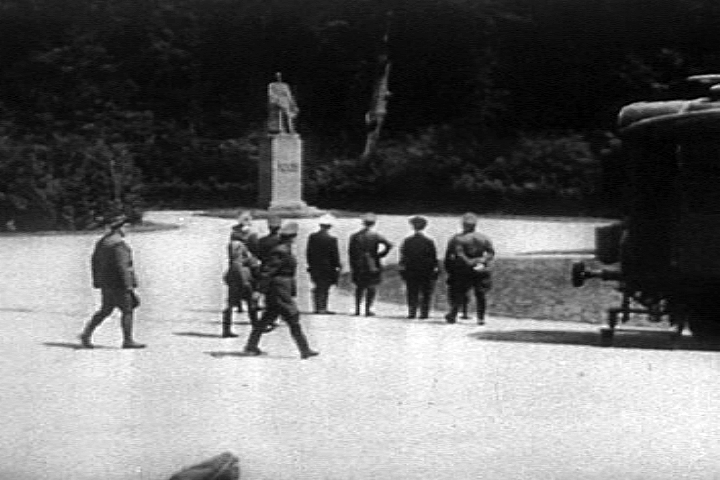
Hitler observing the statue of Marshal Foch, before launching the negotiations, 21 June 1940.

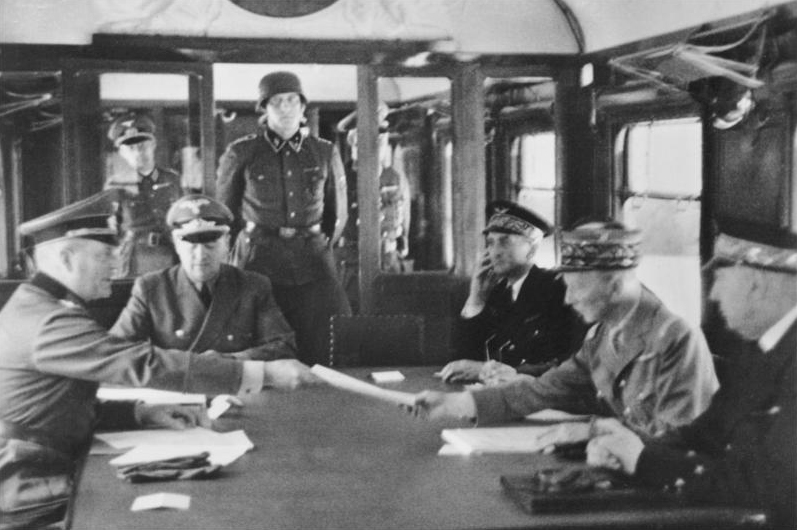
The second Treaty of Compiègne, 22 June 1940.

== Armistice Clearing ==
A memorial site called Clairière de l'Armistice ("Glade of the Armistice", or "Armistice Clearing") covers the historic treaty area. Additions include a statue of Marshal Foch and the large Alsace-Lorraine Memorial, which depicts an Allied sword pinning down an Imperial German eagle. A famous memorial tablet placed at the precise location of the cease-fire signing reads (in French), "Here on the eleventh of November 1918 succumbed the criminal pride of the German Reich... vanquished by the free peoples which it tried to enslave." The original tablet was destroyed by the Nazis, but a new one was emplaced after the war.

For bringing the German delegation to the 1918 meeting, the French had assembled the train with a special saloon car which had once belonged to Napoleon III. The car was decorated with old Imperial emblems, redolent of past glories and mutely confirming the resurgence of French power after its defeat in the Franco-Prussian War in 1870. The two sides then met in a newer railcar, supplied by Compagnie Internationale des Wagons-Lits, to sign the armistice. After the fall of France in World War Two, this same railway carriage was specifically used by the Germans for the armistice of 1940; it was remanded to Germany where it was eventually destroyed by SS troops in Crawinkel, Thuringia, in 1945, and the remains were buried. In 1950, a faithful replica of this original railcar was installed at the site. Decades later, some vestiges of the original car were discovered in Germany and returned to France: the pieces were added to the memorial display in 1995.

The Armistice Clearing remains open to the public six days a week. Visitors routinely leave photographs and other mementos to be displayed or stored in the museum, making it "an ever-changing place of pilgrimage".

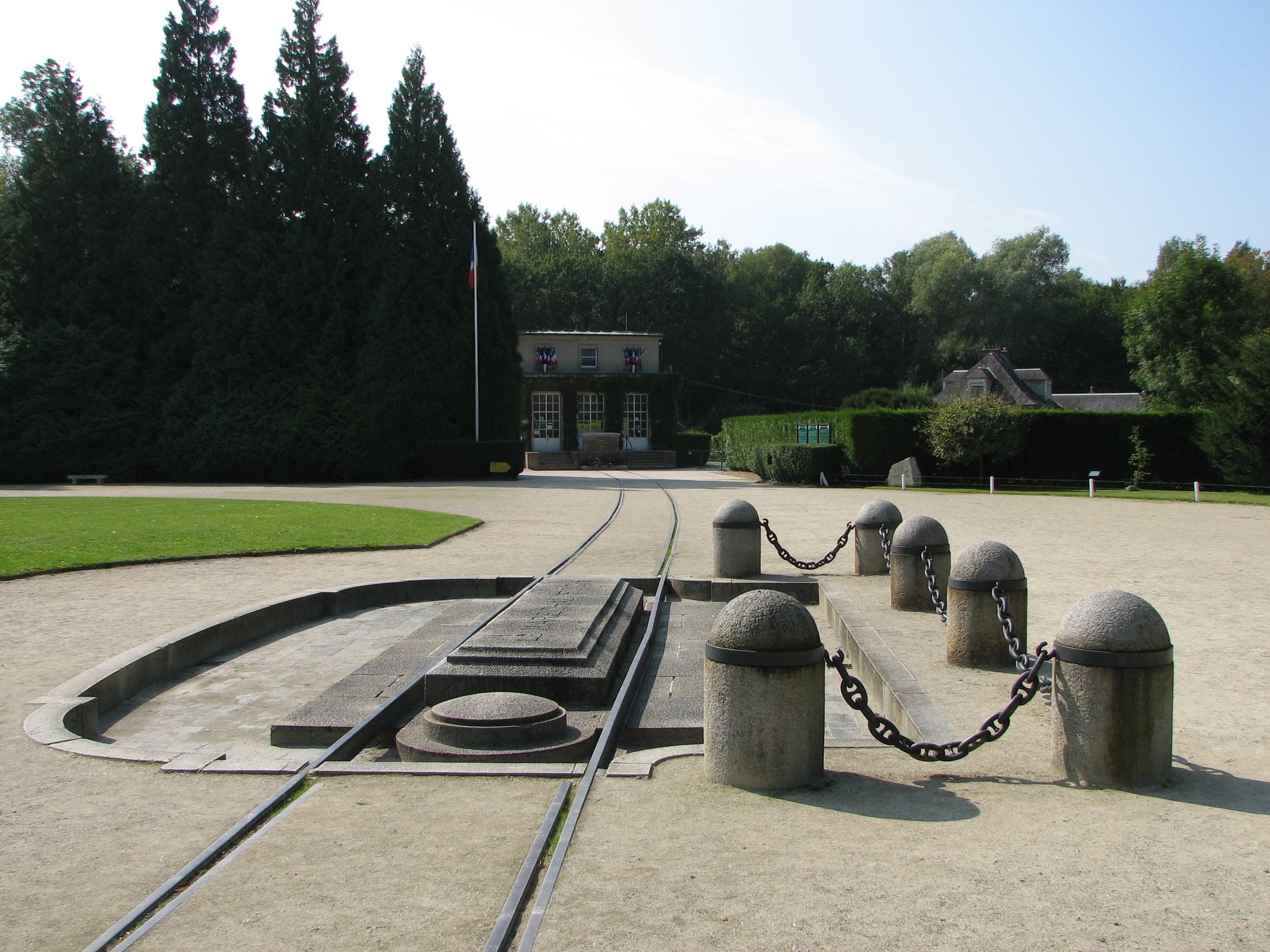
A memorial slab marks the location of the original railcar at Armistice Clearing.
