= Jonquières =

Jonquières is the name or part of the name of several communes in France:

- Jonquières, Aude, in the Aude département
- Jonquières, Hérault, in the Hérault département
- Jonquières, Oise, in the Oise département
- Jonquières, Tarn, in the Tarn département
- Jonquières, Vaucluse, in the Vaucluse département
- Jonquières-Saint-Vincent, in the Gard département
- Saint-Pierre-des-Jonquières, in the Seine-Maritime département

== See also ==
- Jonquières, Bouches-du-Rhône is a former commune of the Bouches-du-Rhône département, now part of Martigues
