= Armancourt =

Armancourt may refer to:

- Armancourt, Oise, a commune of the Oise département in France.
- Armancourt, Somme, a commune of the Somme département in France.
