= Constance (comedian) =

- Born: Constance Pittard; August 3, 1985 (age 41); Vieux-Moulin, France
- Education: Conservatoire de Lille
- Occupations: Actress comedian
- Years active: 2007–present
- Website: https://www.constance-officiel.fr/

Constance Pittard, mainly known by the mononym Constance, (born on 3 August 1985 in Vieux-Moulin in the Oise departement) is a French actress and comedian.

== Early life ==
Constance Pittard was born on 3 August 1985 in Vieux-Moulin, a village located near Cuise-la-Motte. In 2003, after eight years of experience in amateur theatre groups in Picardy, she entered the Conservatory of Lille, then joined the One Man Show School in Paris directed by William Pasquiet. She staged Pasquiet's first solo show entitled Je suis une princesse, bordel ! in 2007. She frequented café-theatres.

== Career ==
Constance joined the FIEALD animation team in 2007 then joined the entertainment show On n'demande qu'à en rire, on December 2, 2010, with an issue entitled A New Princess Arrives at Disney, then became a "resident" of the show on March 1, 2011 where she became known to the general public in France. Thanks to her roles as neurotic women oriented towards dark humor, with Jérémy Ferrari writing some of her numbers. After 51 appearances, Constance ended the experiment on March 28, 2012, by refusing to participate in the draft. She announced it on the radio station Le Mouv' in the program La Morinade by explaining that "what she wants to defend is no longer in line with the general atmosphere of the show" and alluded in particular to her last number, given on Friday, March 23, with which she only collected 58 points. From 2011, Constance was part of the team of Pascal Forneri's documentaries devoted to French songs for the television France 3. In re-enactments, she played the silent role of an anonymous young woman in the 1960s in SLC Salut les copains.

=== New roles and chronicles ===
In April 2014, Constance appeared on the television channel Téva in the short program Constance ou la gueule de l'emploi. From November 2017, she has a column in the show Par Jupiter! on France Inter. On August 28, 2018, she led a column named Parlons Balcon, Parlons Nichons (Let's Talk Balcony, Let's Talk Tits), related to her regret that breastfeeding women in public spaces is regularly a scandal. She denounced the "moralizing puritans" and concluded her speech topless to illustrate her point. This column caused a media frenzy. It has been viewed millions of times and Constance got many insults on social networks. Constance participated as a columnist in the launch of the magazine Siné Madame in avril 2019. From February 6, 2021, she appeared on the show On est en direct with a number in the section Les Petites Phrases de Constance. On March 24, 2025, she made her first appearance as a member in the show Les Grosses Têtes hosted by Laurent Ruquier on RTL.

=== Burnout syndrome and depression, then a new show ===
At the end of 2021, Constance, who suffered from a burnout, suspended her tour and ceased all activity. She reappeared in November 2022 on France Inter where she talked about her difficult year and resumed her weekly columns. This return earned her many messages of support and thanks for having addressed with honesty a subject that affects millions of people. On January 31, 2023, the actress announced on social networks that she had decided to withdraw from public life again.

She then underwent a psychiatric course, during which she was diagnosed with bipolar disorder. From her experience of depression, suicidal thoughts, and the world of psychiatry, she launched with her co-author Pascal Duclermortier a new show called InConstance, which she presented in 2024. The show received significant media coverage. For Sandrine Blanchard in Le Monde, she is "terribly movingly funny". Aziliz Claquin, in La Croix l'hebdo, considers the show "ourageous and full of finesse, in the form of a confession". In Télérama, Rossana Di Vincenzo found it "both moving and hilarious". Tiphaine Honnet, in Madame Figaro, described it as a "theatrical UFO" and Nathalie Simon spoke in Le Figaro of a "jubilant" show.

== Controversies ==
=== Controversy over the Rwandan genocide ===
On April 7, 2020, in a column on France Inter entitled Confine-toi toi-même !, Constance declared on the subject of the genocide of the Tutsi in Rwanda: "Pillows or machetes, it is sometimes a matter of few words". In reaction to these remarks, the lawyer Richard Gisagara, who is at the origin of the French law punishing genocide denial, declared in the newspaper Jeune Afrique:

By comparing the genocide against the Tutsi to a friendly fight of duffel bags on France Inter, the comedian Constance Pittard perpetuates, 26 years after the tragedy, the ordinary racism that trivializes "the crime of crimes" when it occurs on the African continent.

This incident having provoked many other reactions, the actress made a public apology.

== Theatre ==
=== One Man Shows ===
- 2008–2011: Je suis une princesse, bordel !, at the Théâtre Le Bout (two years on the bill) then three years later at the Comedy of Paris Theater in Paris (six months on the bill)
- 2012–2014: Mothers Hide to Die, co-written with Jérémy Ferrari, at the Comedy of Paris Theater in Paris (13 months on the bill) and on a French-language tour in 2013 and 2014
- 2015: Sentimental Gangbang, at the Théâtre de la Comedy of Paris Theater in Paris from January 27, 2015, to the end of November 2015
- 2016–2017: Gerbes d'amour, with Marie Reno, at the Festival d'Avignon 2016, at the Ten Hours Theater in Paris from octobre 2016– to the end of décembre 2016 and then on a French-language tour from January 2017
- 2018–2021: Pot pourri, at the Avignon Festival 2018 and then on tour throughout France from August 2018
- Since 2024: InConstance co-written with Pascal Duclermortier, directed by Eric Chantelauze
