= Maurice Choron =

French fighter pilot (1911 - 1942)

- Born: 7 November 1911; Béthisy-Saint-Pierre, France
- Died: 10 April 1942 (aged 30); English Channel
- Military career
- Allegiance: France
- Branch: Free French Air Force
- Unit: Groupe de chasse Île-de-France
- Known for: Aviator
- Conflicts: World War II
- Awards: Legion of Honour; Companions of Liberation; Croix de Guerre; Resistance Medal

Maurice Philippe César Choron (November 7, 1911 – April 10, 1942) was a French World War II fighter pilot.

== Biography ==
Choron was born at Béthisy-Saint-Pierre. He was married to Renée Joséphine Lebrun with whom he had two daughters.

Working as an aviator instructor, Choron joined the Free French Air Forces in July 1940. In September, he was assigned to the 64th Squadron, then in July 1941 to the 609th Squadron, before moving in April 1942 to the Groupe de chasse Île-de-France (the 340th “Free French” Squadron) under the command of Lieutenant Commander Philippe de Scitivaux. During the group's first flight, he was shot down and disappeared at sea. At his time of death he was ranked Lieutenant de Reserve.

Choron was awarded the Companions of Liberation, having flown in 62 combat missions. He holds 2 certain and 3 probable victories during and after the Battle of Britain.
