= Pitard =

Pitard is a surname. Notable people with the surname include:

- Charles-Joseph Marie Pitard (1872–1928), French pharmacist and botanist
- Jean Pitard (~1228–1315), royal surgeon to Louis IX, Philip the Bold and Philip the Fair of France

== See also ==
- Pittard
