= Saint-Étienne-Roilaye =

- Commune
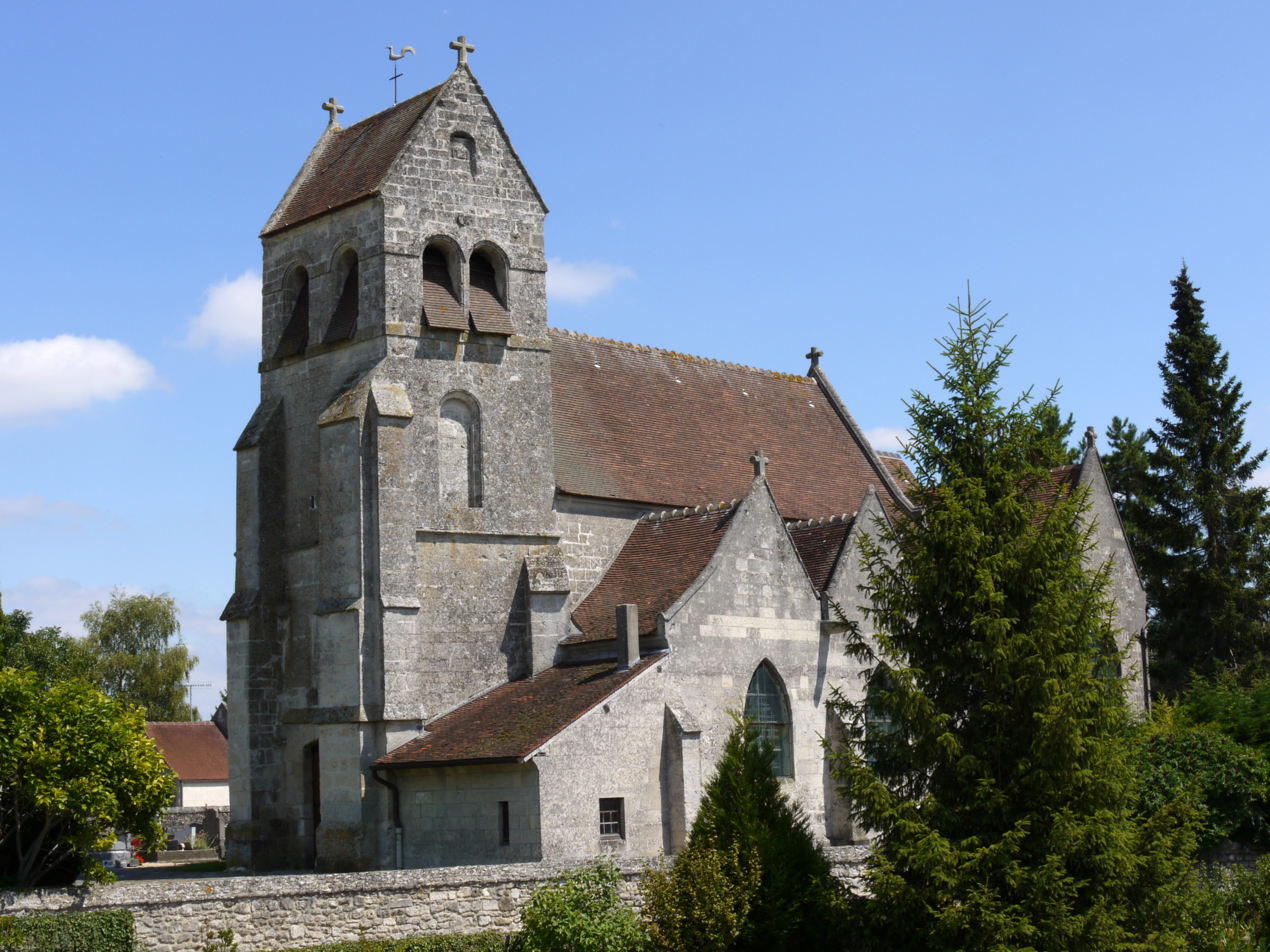
- The church in Saint-Étienne-Roilaye
- Location of Saint-Étienne-Roilaye
- Location within France Location within Hauts-de-France
- Coordinates: 49°21′13″N 3°01′07″E
- Country: France
- Region: Hauts-de-France
- Department: Oise
- Arrondissement: Compiègne
- Canton: Compiègne-2
- Intercommunality: Lisières de l'Oise

Government
  - Mayor (2020–2026): Eric Beguin
- Area^{1}: 7.96 km^{2} (3.07 sq mi)
- Elevation: 130 m (430 ft)
- Highest elevation: 141 m (463 ft)
- Lowest elevation: 48 m (157 ft)
- Population (2023): 301
  - Density: 37.8/km^{2} (97.9/sq mi)
- Time zone: UTC+01:00 (CET)
  - Summer (DST): UTC+02:00 (CEST)
- INSEE/Postal code: 60572 /60350
- ^{1} French Land Register data, which excludes lakes, ponds, glaciers > 1 km^{2} (0.386 sq mi or 247 acres) and river estuaries.

Saint-Étienne-Roilaye (French pronunciation: [sɛ̃.t‿etjɛn ʁwalɛ]) is a commune in the Oise department in northern France.

== See also ==
- Communes of the Oise department
