= Chelles, Oise =

Chelles
- Commune
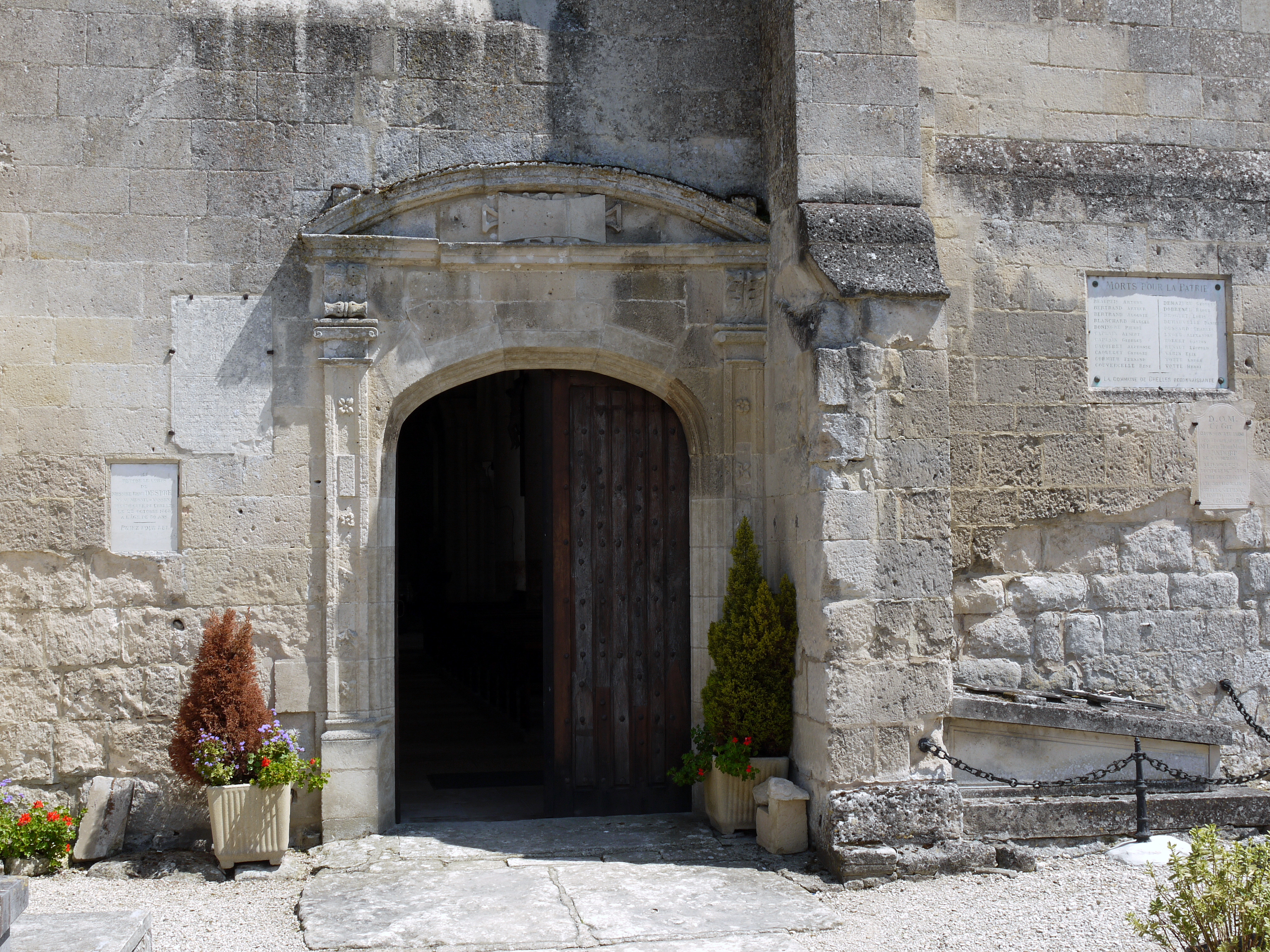
- The door of the church in Chelles
- Location of Chelles
- Location within France Location within Hauts-de-France
- Coordinates: 49°21′12″N 3°02′07″E
- Country: France
- Region: Hauts-de-France
- Department: Oise
- Arrondissement: Compiègne
- Canton: Compiègne-2
- Intercommunality: Lisières de l'Oise

Government
  - Mayor (2020–2026): Christian Deblois
- Area^{1}: 9.08 km^{2} (3.51 sq mi)
- Elevation: 57 m (187 ft)
- Highest elevation: 150 m (490 ft)
- Lowest elevation: 56 m (184 ft)
- Population (2023): 471
  - Density: 51.9/km^{2} (134/sq mi)
- Time zone: UTC+01:00 (CET)
  - Summer (DST): UTC+02:00 (CEST)
- INSEE/Postal code: 60145 /60350
- ^{1} French Land Register data, which excludes lakes, ponds, glaciers > 1 km^{2} (0.386 sq mi or 247 acres) and river estuaries.

Chelles (French pronunciation: [ʃɛl]) is a commune in the Oise department in northern France.

== See also ==
- Communes of the Oise department
