= Lachelle =

- Commune
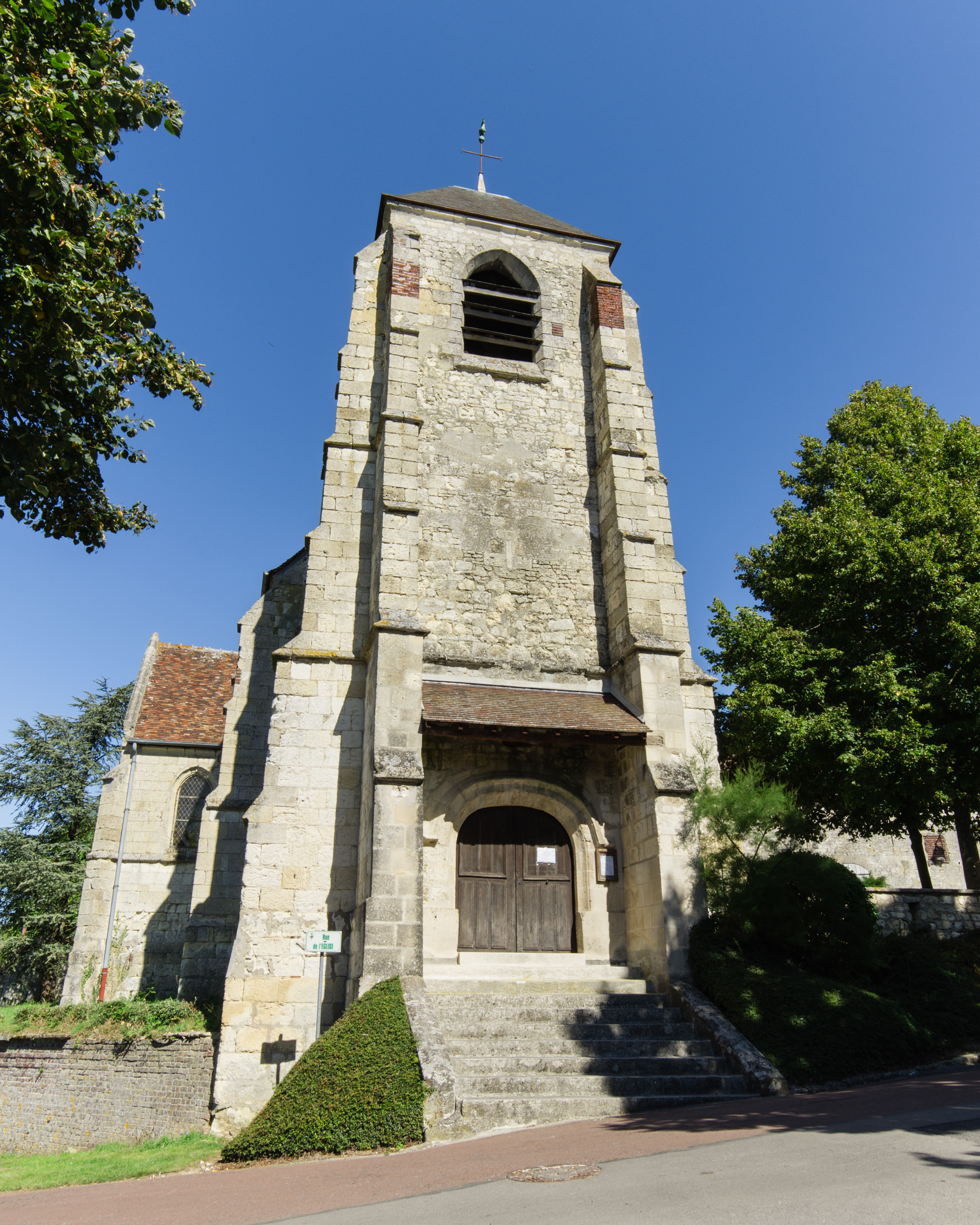
- The church in Lachelle
- Location of Lachelle
- Location within France Location within Hauts-de-France
- Coordinates: 49°26′42″N 2°44′08″E
- Country: France
- Region: Hauts-de-France
- Department: Oise
- Arrondissement: Compiègne
- Canton: Compiègne-2
- Intercommunality: CA Région de Compiègne et Basse Automne

Government
  - Mayor (2020–2026): Xavier Louvet
- Area^{1}: 9.07 km^{2} (3.50 sq mi)
- Elevation: 55 m (180 ft)
- Highest elevation: 91 m (299 ft)
- Lowest elevation: 49 m (161 ft)
- Population (2023): 805
  - Density: 88.8/km^{2} (230/sq mi)
- Time zone: UTC+01:00 (CET)
  - Summer (DST): UTC+02:00 (CEST)
- INSEE/Postal code: 60337 /60190
- ^{1} French Land Register data, which excludes lakes, ponds, glaciers > 1 km^{2} (0.386 sq mi or 247 acres) and river estuaries.

Lachelle (French pronunciation: [laʃɛl]) is a commune in the Oise department in northern France.

== Demography ==
Historical population
Year	Pop.	±% p.a.
1968	267	—
1975	317	+2.48%
1982	354	+1.59%
1990	522	+4.97%
1999	561	+0.80%
2007	598	+0.80%
2012	574	−0.82%
2017	651	+2.55%
2023	805	+3.60%
Source: INSEE

== See also ==
- Communes of the Oise department
