= Jaux =

- Commune
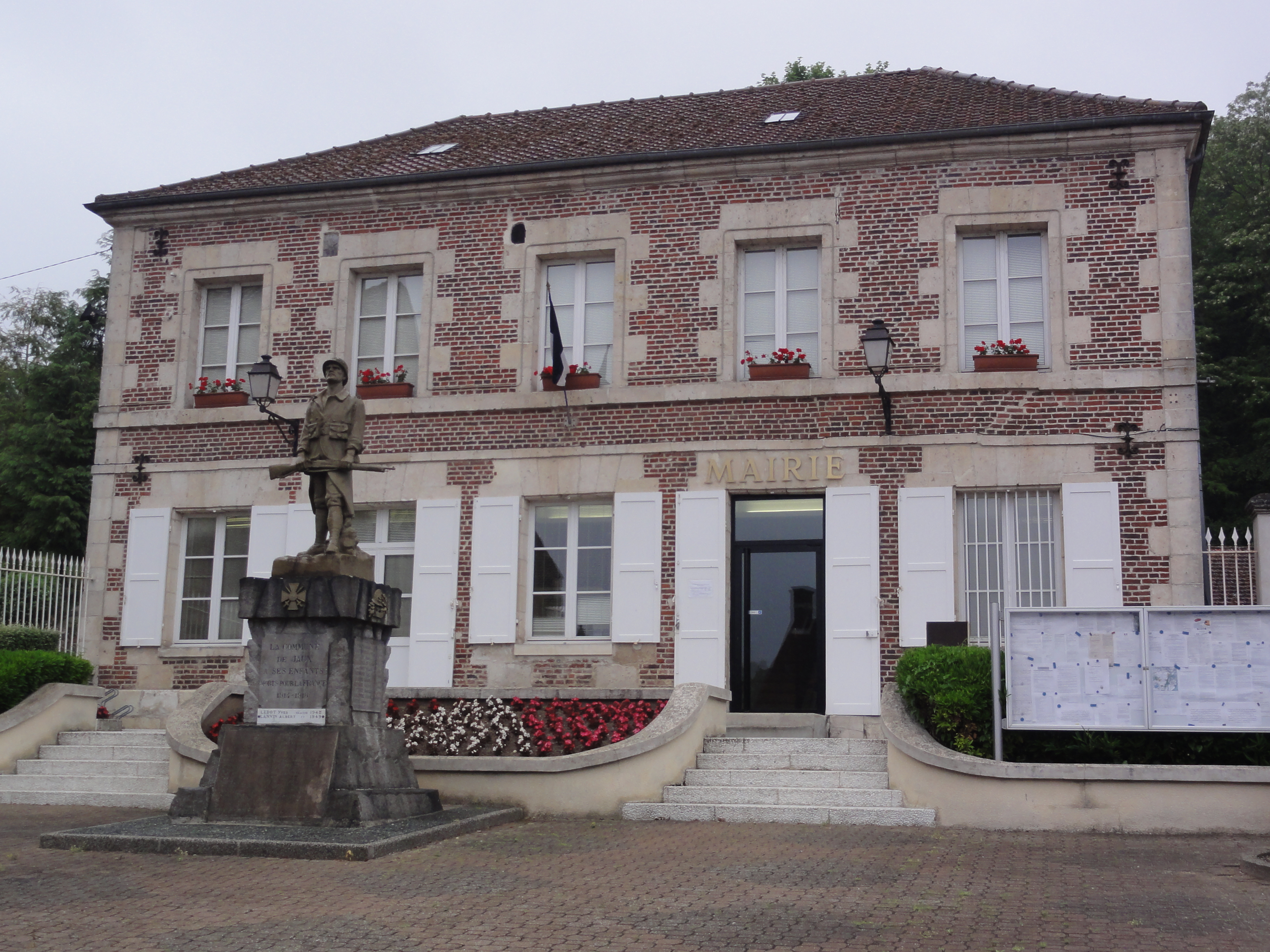
- The town hall and war memorial in Jaux
- Location of Jaux
- Location within France Location within Hauts-de-France
- Coordinates: 49°23′24″N 2°46′36″E
- Country: France
- Region: Hauts-de-France
- Department: Oise
- Arrondissement: Compiègne
- Canton: Compiègne-2
- Intercommunality: CA Région de Compiègne et Basse Automne

Government
  - Mayor (2020–2026): Sidonie Muselet
- Area^{1}: 8.63 km^{2} (3.33 sq mi)
- Highest elevation: 125 m (410 ft)
- Lowest elevation: 31 m (102 ft)
- Population (2023): 2,243
  - Density: 260/km^{2} (673/sq mi)
- Time zone: UTC+01:00 (CET)
  - Summer (DST): UTC+02:00 (CEST)
- INSEE/Postal code: 60325 /60880
- ^{1} French Land Register data, which excludes lakes, ponds, glaciers > 1 km^{2} (0.386 sq mi or 247 acres) and river estuaries.

Jaux (French pronunciation: [ʒo]) is a commune in the Oise department in northern France.

== Population ==
Historical population
Year	Pop.	±% p.a.
1968	817	—
1975	942	+2.05%
1982	1,087	+2.07%
1990	1,407	+3.28%
1999	2,078	+4.43%
2007	2,258	+1.04%
2012	2,391	+1.15%
2017	2,411	+0.17%
2023	2,243	−1.20%
Source: INSEE

== See also ==
- Communes of the Oise department
