= Hautefontaine =

- Commune
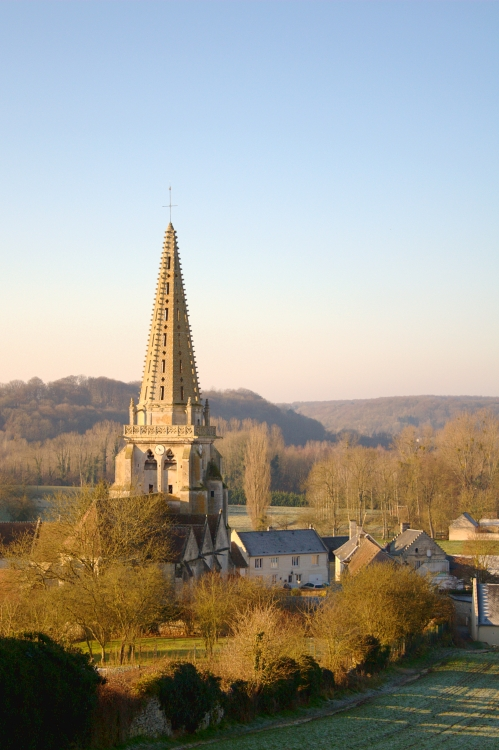
- The church in Hautefontaine
- Location of Hautefontaine
- Location within France Location within Hauts-de-France
- Coordinates: 49°22′00″N 3°03′44″E
- Country: France
- Region: Hauts-de-France
- Department: Oise
- Arrondissement: Compiègne
- Canton: Compiègne-2

Government
  - Mayor (2020–2026): Thierry Sarközy
- Area^{1}: 5.57 km^{2} (2.15 sq mi)
- Elevation: 85 m (279 ft)
- Highest elevation: 152 m (499 ft)
- Lowest elevation: 58 m (190 ft)
- Population (2023): 345
  - Density: 61.9/km^{2} (160/sq mi)
- Time zone: UTC+01:00 (CET)
  - Summer (DST): UTC+02:00 (CEST)
- INSEE/Postal code: 60305 /60350
- ^{1} French Land Register data, which excludes lakes, ponds, glaciers > 1 km^{2} (0.386 sq mi or 247 acres) and river estuaries.

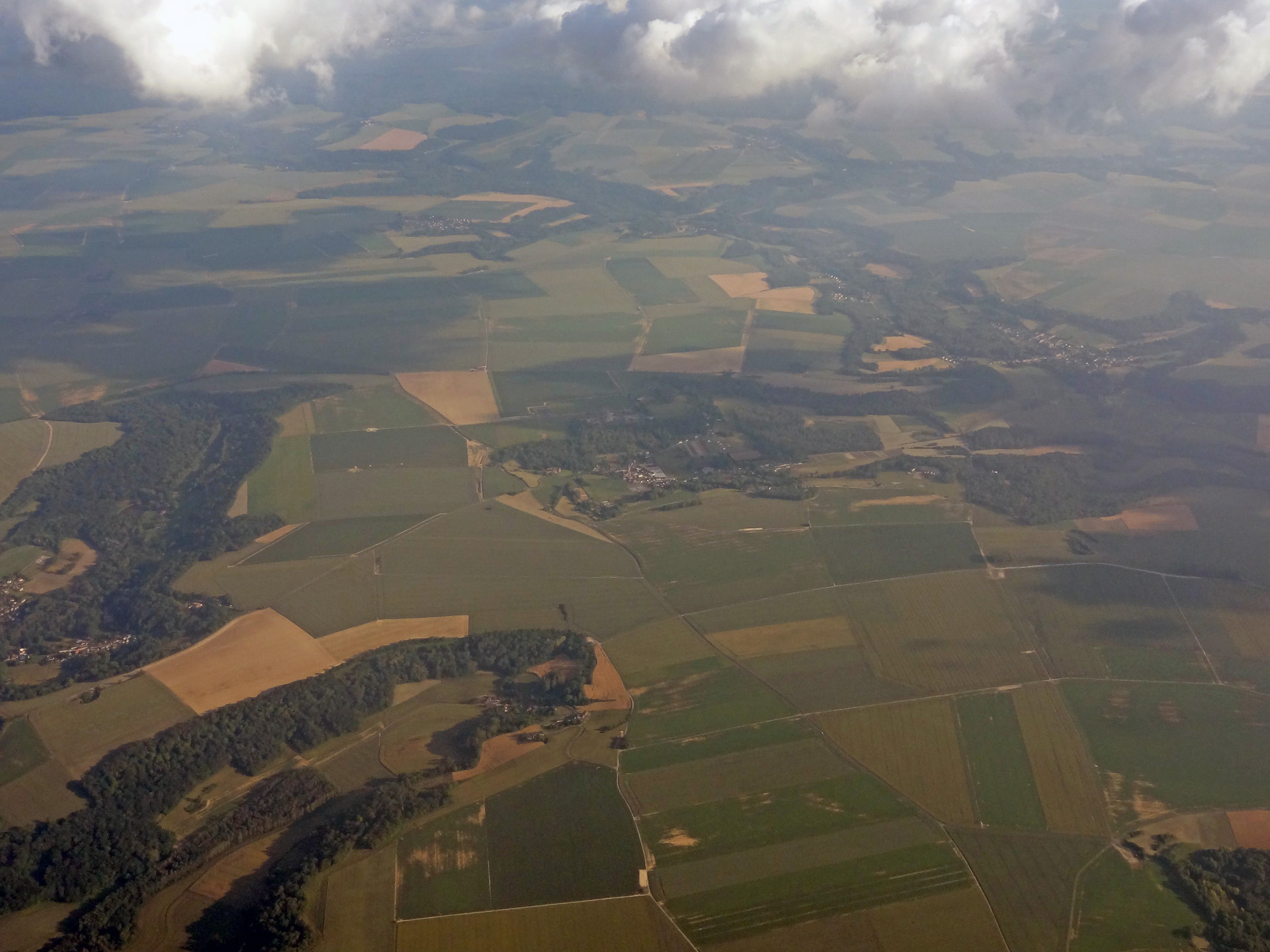
Aerial view of Hautefontaine

Hautefontaine (French pronunciation: [ot.fɔ̃tɛn]) is a commune in the Oise department in northern France.

== See also ==
- Communes of the Oise department
