= Canton of Compiègne-2 =

Canton of France

Coordinates: 49.41°N 2.81°E

- Canton
- Situation of the canton of Compiègne-2 in the department of Oise
- Country: France
- Region: Hauts-de-France
- Department: Oise
- No. of communes: {{{nbcomm}}}
- Population (2023): 47,832
- INSEE code: 6007

The canton of Compiègne-2 is an administrative division of the Oise department, northern France. It was created at the French canton reorganisation which came into effect in March 2015. Its seat is in Compiègne.

It consists of the following communes:

1. Armancourt
2. Chelles
3. Compiègne (partly)
4. Croutoy
5. Cuise-la-Motte
6. Hautefontaine
7. Jaux
8. Jonquières
9. Lachelle
10. Lacroix-Saint-Ouen
11. Le Meux
12. Pierrefonds
13. Saint-Étienne-Roilaye
14. Saint-Jean-aux-Bois
15. Saint-Sauveur
16. Venette
17. Vieux-Moulin
