= Pittard =

Pittard is an English and French surname. Notable people with the name include:

- Alan Pittard (1902–1992), Australian politician
- Constance Pittard (born 1985), French actress and comedian
- Dana J.H. Pittard, U.S. military officer
- Denis Pittard (born 1945), Australian rugby league footballer
- Eugène Pittard (1867–1962), Swiss anthropologist
- Jasper Pittard (born 1991), Australian rules footballer
- Jill Pittard (born 1977), English badminton player

== See also ==
- Mount Pittard, a peak in Antarctica
