= Compiègne =

Compiègne Compiène (Picard)
- Subprefecture and commune
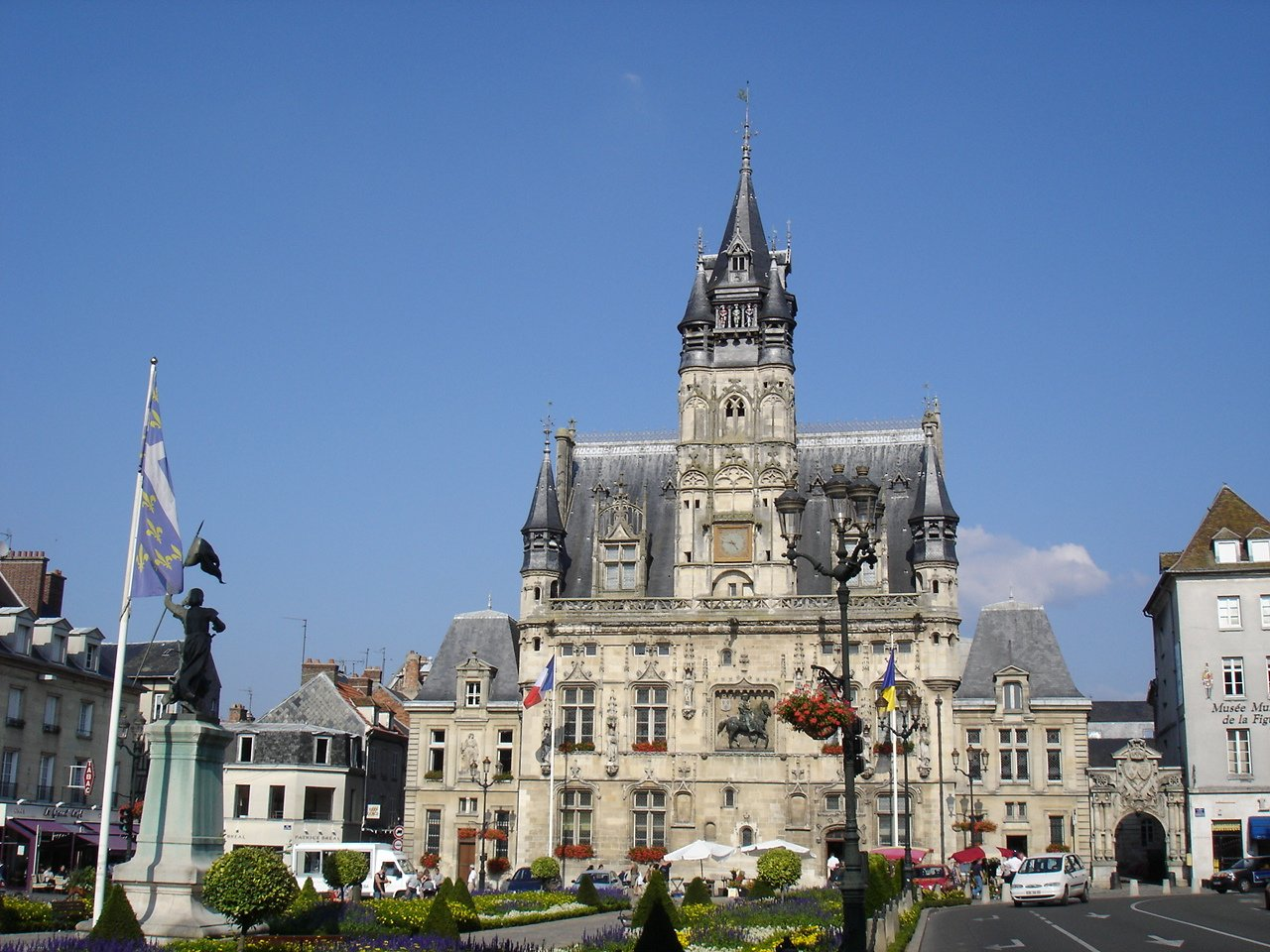
- The Hôtel de Ville

- Coat of arms
- Location of Compiègne
- Location within France Location within Hauts-de-France
- Coordinates: 49°24′54″N 2°49′23″E
- Country: France
- Region: Hauts-de-France
- Department: Oise
- Arrondissement: Compiègne
- Canton: Compiègne-1 and 2
- Intercommunality: CA Région de Compiègne et Basse Automne

Government
  - Mayor (2020–2026): Philippe Marini
- Area^{1}: 53.1 km^{2} (20.5 sq mi)
- Elevation: 41 m (135 ft)
- Highest elevation: 134 m (440 ft)
- Lowest elevation: 31 m (102 ft)
- Population (2023): 40,761
  - Density: 768/km^{2} (1,990/sq mi)
- Time zone: UTC+01:00 (CET)
  - Summer (DST): UTC+02:00 (CEST)
- INSEE/Postal code: 60159 /60200
- ^{1} French Land Register data, which excludes lakes, ponds, glaciers > 1 km^{2} (0.386 sq mi or 247 acres) and river estuaries.

Compiègne (French pronunciation: [kɔ̃pjɛɲ]; Picard: Compiène) is a commune in the Oise department of northern France. It is located on the river Oise, and its inhabitants are called Compiégnois ([kɔ̃pjeɲwa]).

== Administration ==
Compiègne is the seat of two cantons:

- Compiègne-1 (with 19 communes and part of Compiègne)
- Compiègne-2 (with 16 communes and part of Compiègne)

== History ==
- 665 - Saint Wilfrid was consecrated Bishop of York. Wilfrid refused to be consecrated in Northumbria at the hands of Anglo-Saxon bishops. Deusdedit, Archbishop of Canterbury, had died, and as there were no other bishops in Britain whom Wilfrid considered to have been validly consecrated, he travelled to Compiègne, to be consecrated by Agilbert, the Bishop of Paris.
- 757 - Byzantine emperor Constantine V sent to Compiègne a gift for Pepin the Short : France's first organ.
- 833 - Louis the Pious (also known as King Louis I, the Debonair) was deposed in Compiègne.
- February 888 - Odo, Count of Paris and king of the Franks was crowned in Compiègne.
- 23 May 1430 - During the Hundred Years' War, Joan of Arc was captured by the Burgundians while attempting to free Compiègne. They then sold her to the English.
- 1557 - Battle of St. Quentin, where Habsburg Spanish forces defeat a French army in the Italian War of 1551–1559
- 1558 - The English occupy Compiègne
- 1624 - Compiègne gave its name to the Treaty of Compiègne, a treaty of alliance concluded by Cardinal Richelieu with the Dutch.
- 1630 - Marie de' Medici's attempts to displace Richelieu ultimately led to her exile to Compiègne, from where she escaped to Brussels in 1631.
- 17 July 1794 - The Martyrs of Compiègne are executed in Paris during the Reign of Terror.
- 1900 - The golf events for the 1900 Summer Olympics took place.
- 11 November 1918 - The Armistice with Germany, agreed at Le Francport near Compiègne, ends fighting in World War I.
- 22 June 1940 - The Second Compiègne Armistice was signed between Nazi Germany and the defeated France in Le Francport, in the same place as in 1918, in the same railroad carriage, but with the seats swapped.
- 1941 - During the German occupation of France, the Compiègne internment camp was established in Compiègne. A memorial of the camp, and another along the railway tracks, commemorate the event.
- 1972 - Creation of the University of Technology of Compiègne
- 1977 - The starting location of the Paris–Roubaix bicycle race was changed from Paris to Compiègne.

=== Population ===
Compiègne is the central commune of an urban unit with 71,598 inhabitants, and a larger commuter zone with 142,230 inhabitants as of 2022. The population data in the table and graph below refer to the commune of Compiègne proper.

Historical population

Year	Pop.	±% p.a.
1793	8,000	—
1800	7,058	−1.77%
1806	7,165	+0.25%
1821	7,228	+0.06%
1831	8,879	+2.08%
1836	8,895	+0.04%
1841	9,076	+0.40%
1846	9,762	+1.47%
1851	10,795	+2.03%
1856	10,364	−0.81%
1861	12,137	+3.21%
1866	10,714	−2.46%
1872	10,775	+0.09%
1876	13,393	+5.59%
1881	14,008	+0.90%
1886	14,375	+0.52%
1891	14,498	+0.17%
1896	15,225	+0.98%
1901	16,503	+1.63%

Year	Pop.	±% p.a.
1906	16,868	+0.44%
1911	17,046	+0.21%
1921	16,179	−0.52%
1926	17,361	+1.42%
1931	17,852	+0.56%
1936	18,885	+1.13%
1946	18,218	−0.36%
1954	22,325	+2.57%
1962	24,427	+1.13%
1968	29,700	+3.31%
1975	37,699	+3.47%
1982	40,384	+0.99%
1990	41,896	+0.46%
1999	41,254	−0.17%
2007	41,714	+0.14%
2012	40,028	−0.82%
2017	40,199	+0.09%
2023	40,761	+0.23%

Source: EHESS and INSEE (1968–2023)

== Sights ==
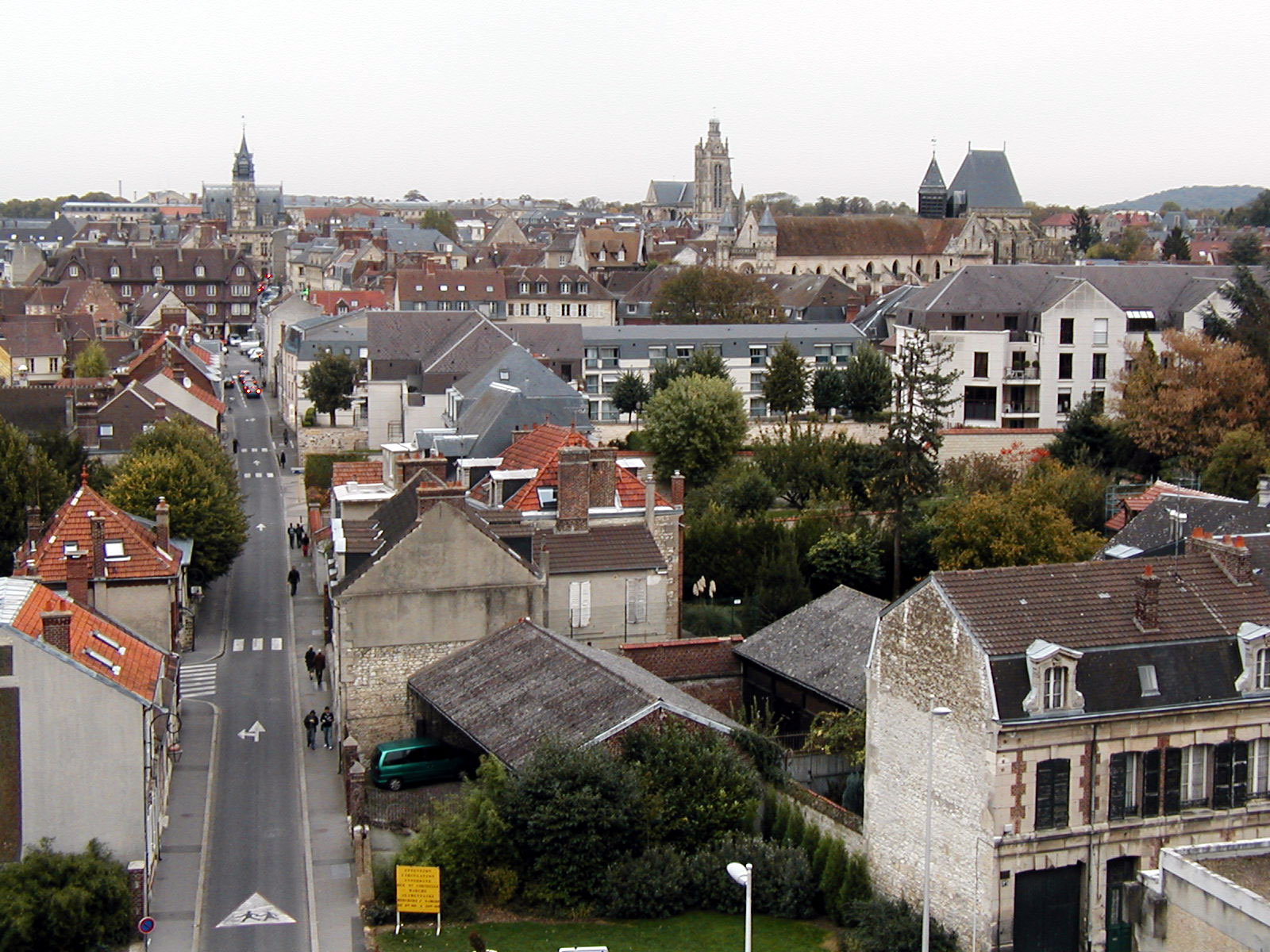
View of Compiègne

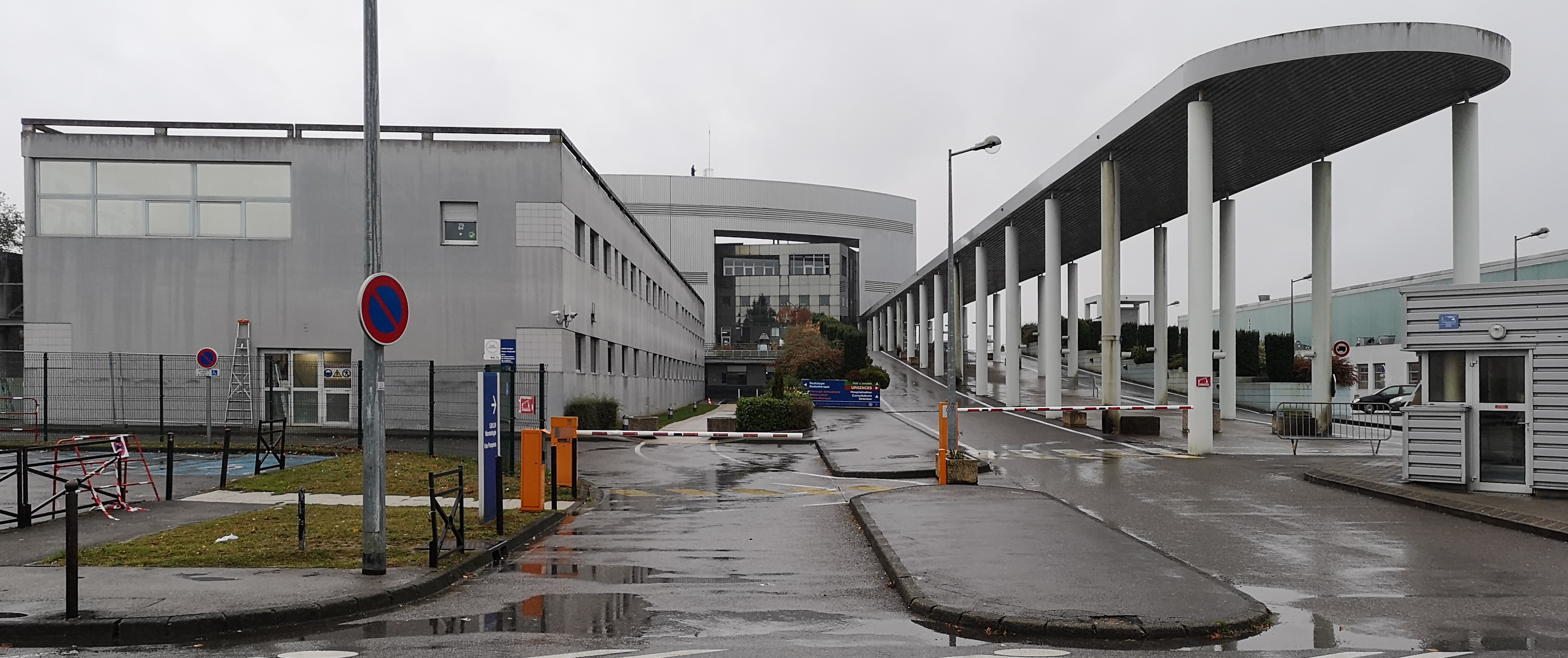
Compiegne-Noyon Hospital

The Hôtel de Ville (town hall) was completed in 1530.

=== Museums ===
- Château de Compiègne - the castle itself, and museums of the Second French Empire and of motoring and tourism within its walls
- Musée Antoine Vivenel
- Museum of historic figurines
- Memorial of internment and deportation

=== Compiègne Forest ===
The Glade of the Armistice in the Compiègne Forest was the site of the signing of two armistices; those of 11 November 1918 and 22 June 1940. Hitler specifically chose the location of the second, and had the original signing carriage moved from Paris to Compiègne, as an irony for the defeated French.

The site still houses several memorials to the 1918 armistice, including a copy of the original railway carriage. The original, Marshal Foch's Carriage, was taken to Germany as a trophy of victory following the second armistice. Various rumors about what happened to this railway carriage thereafter have flourished ever since. Some believe it was destroyed by the SS in Thuringia in April 1945; others say this happened in Berlin, but most likely it was destroyed during an Allied air-raid on Berlin. The latter version seems most plausible, since Ferdinand Foch's carriage actually was displayed at a Berlin museum.

== The University of Technology of Compiègne ==
Compiègne is home to the University of Technology of Compiègne (UTC), one of the top ranking engineering school in France, founded as a Technology University in 1972 to provide an alternative to the traditional "grandes écoles" for students interested in technologies and applied science.

== Transport ==
Compiègne station offers connections with Paris, Amiens, Cambrai and several regional destinations. The nearest motorway is the A1 Paris-Lille. The nearest airport is Charles de Gaulle Airport, located 58 km (36 mi) south west of the commune.

== Cycling ==
Since 1977, Compiègne is the traditional start city of the famous Paris–Roubaix bicycle race. It was also the finish city of the 3rd stage in the 2007 Tour de France.

== Notable people ==
Compiègne has been home to:

John Scotus Eriugena (c. 810 - 875), Irish Philosopher. Considered the most original and significant intellectual of the early middle ages.

- Roscellinus (~1050 - ~1122), philosopher and theologian, often regarded as the founder of Nominalism
- Pierre d'Ailly (1350–1420), theologian and cardinal of the Roman Catholic Church
- The Martyrs of Compiègne
- Albert Robida (1848–1926), illustrator, etcher, lithographer, caricaturist, and novelist
- Eugène Albertini (1880–1941), teacher in Latin literature, historian of ancient Rome, and epigrapher of Latin texts
- Marcel Tabuteau (1887–1966), Oboist, regarded as the founder of American oboe playing.
- Suzanne Lenglen (1899–1938), tennis player, international female sport star
- Lucas Debargue (1990–), pianist and composer who works in both the classical and jazz fields

== International relations ==
Compiègne is twinned with:

Arona, Italy, since 1962; (United Kingdom) Bury St Edmunds, England, since 1967; Elbląg, Poland, since 2002; Guimarães, Portugal, since 2006; Huy, Belgium, since 1959	Kiryat Tivon, Israel, since 1988; Landshut, Germany, since 1962; Raleigh, North Carolina, United States, since 1989; Shirakawa, Fukushima, Japan, since 1988; Vianden, Luxembourg, since 1964

Compiègne is also partnered with:

- Beauvais, France

== Climate ==
Climate data for Compiègne (Margny-lès-Compiègne) (1994–2020 normals, extremes 1994–present)
Month	Jan	Feb	Mar	Apr	May	Jun	Jul	Aug	Sep	Oct	Nov	Dec	Year
Record high °C (°F)	14.8 (58.6)	19.0 (66.2)	25.1 (77.2)	27.5 (81.5)	30.6 (87.1)	35.5 (95.9)	41.5 (106.7)	39.2 (102.6)	34.8 (94.6)	28.2 (82.8)	20.2 (68.4)	16.4 (61.5)	41.5 (106.7)
Mean daily maximum °C (°F)	6.4 (43.5)	7.9 (46.2)	11.6 (52.9)	15.5 (59.9)	18.8 (65.8)	22.2 (72.0)	24.7 (76.5)	24.6 (76.3)	20.7 (69.3)	15.9 (60.6)	10.3 (50.5)	6.9 (44.4)	15.5 (59.9)
Daily mean °C (°F)	3.9 (39.0)	4.8 (40.6)	7.5 (45.5)	10.5 (50.9)	13.8 (56.8)	16.9 (62.4)	19.0 (66.2)	18.9 (66.0)	15.6 (60.1)	12.0 (53.6)	7.5 (45.5)	4.5 (40.1)	11.2 (52.2)
Mean daily minimum °C (°F)	1.5 (34.7)	1.8 (35.2)	3.4 (38.1)	5.4 (41.7)	8.8 (47.8)	11.5 (52.7)	13.3 (55.9)	13.3 (55.9)	10.5 (50.9)	8.2 (46.8)	4.7 (40.5)	2.2 (36.0)	7.0 (44.6)
Record low °C (°F)	−15.0 (5.0)	−10.3 (13.5)	−10.4 (13.3)	−4.8 (23.4)	−0.6 (30.9)	3.1 (37.6)	4.9 (40.8)	4.9 (40.8)	0.5 (32.9)	−4.6 (23.7)	−10.4 (13.3)	−11.3 (11.7)	−15.0 (5.0)
Average precipitation mm (inches)	50.9 (2.00)	44.9 (1.77)	42.7 (1.68)	42.1 (1.66)	57.7 (2.27)	54.4 (2.14)	56.6 (2.23)	62.9 (2.48)	43.9 (1.73)	60.2 (2.37)	52.6 (2.07)	64.6 (2.54)	633.5 (24.94)
Average precipitation days (≥ 1.0 mm)	10.8	9.6	9.3	8.4	9.4	8.7	8.0	8.9	7.7	9.5	10.4	12.4	113.1
Source: Meteociel

== See also ==
- Communes of the Oise department
- Dialogues of the Carmelites
- Martyrs of Compiegne
- Monument aux morts (Oise)
- Siege of Compiègne
- Timeline of deportations of French Jews to death camps
