= Hôtel de Ville, Compiègne =

Town hall in Compiègne, France

Hôtel de Ville
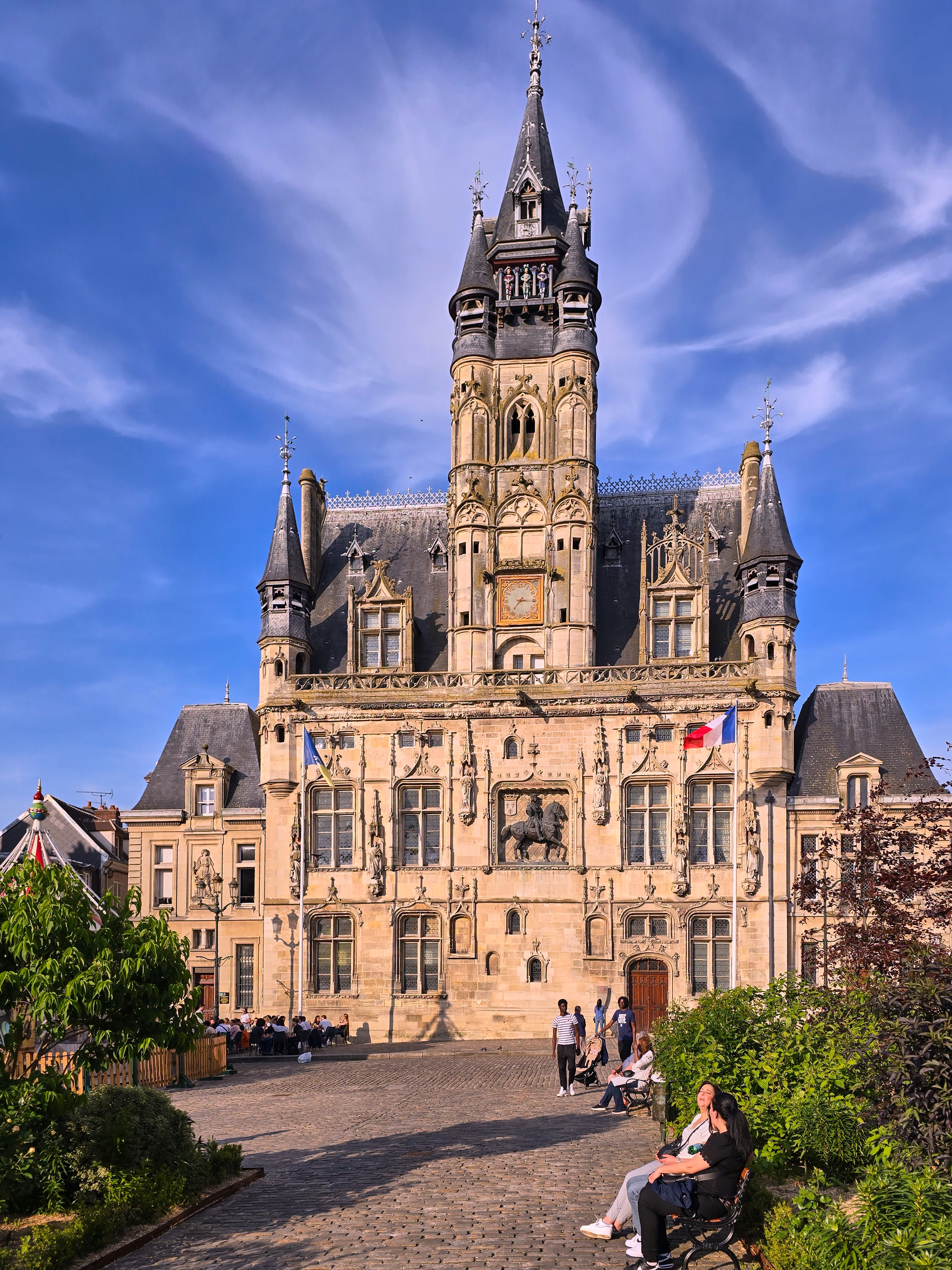
- The main frontage of the Hôtel de Ville in May 2024

General information
- Type: City hall
- Architectural style: Gothic style
- Location: Compiègne, France
- Coordinates: 49.4179°N 2.8261°E
- Completed: 1530

Design and construction
- Architect: Pierre Navyer (known as Pierre de Meaux)

Monument historique
- Official name: Hôtel de ville
- Type: Inscrit
- Designated: 1840
- Reference no.: PA00114622

The Hôtel de Ville (French pronunciation: [otɛl də vil], City Hall) is a municipal building in Compiègne, Oise, northern France, standing on Place de l'Hôtel de Ville. The building was designated a monument historique by the French government in 1840.

== History ==
In 1397, a local merchant, Jean Loutrel, bequeathed two properties on the northeast side of Place du Marché au Blé (now Place de l'Hôtel de Ville) for the use of the aldermen. A century later, the aldermen decided to demolish the old properties and to commission a town hall on the site. The building was designed and built by Pierre Navyer (known as Pierre de Meaux) in the Gothic style. The aldermen held their first meeting in the main hall there in January 1513 and all the additional sculptures and other works were fully complete by 1530.

The design involved a near-symmetrical main frontage of five bays facing onto Place du Marché au Blé. The central bay featured three small arched windows spaced out on an irregular basis on the ground floor, a large niche originally containing two figures of the Annunciation sculpted by Nicolas d'Estrée on the first floor, and a 47 metres (154 ft)-high clock tower above. The clock tower was decorated by a pair of turrets at the front corners and surmounted by a spire. The outer bays were fenestrated by mullioned and transomed windows and, at roof level, there was a elaborate balustrade which connected a pair of bartizans. Internally, the principal rooms included the Salle de la justice de Paix, later known as the Salle du Conseil (council chamber).

The original sculptures in the niche were replaced by a statue of Louis XIV, sculpted by Gilles Guérin, in 1655 but this was torn down during the French Revolution. The building was expanded by the addition of two wings: the right wing (i.e. south wing) was built in 1650 and the left wing (i.e. north wing) was completed in 1867. An equestrian statue of Louis XII (who was the monarch at the time of the construction of the building) sculpted by Henri Alfred Jacquemart was installed in the niche on the first floor in 1869. The statues on the front of the building were restored under the supervision of Eugène Viollet-le-Duc around the same time: they depicted Charles VII, Joan of Arc, Saint Denis, Saint Louis, Pierre d'Ailly and Charlemagne.

A statue of Joan of Arc, based on a drawing by the sculptor, Frédéric-Étienne Leroux, was installed in front of the town hall in 1880. Between 1904 and 1907, the artist, Raymond Fournier-Sarlovèze, painted nine scenes depicting important local events for the walls of the council chamber.

During the German spring offensive in spring 1918, part of the First World War, the whole town, including the town hall, was evacuated due to the proximity of the fighting. Following the liberation of the town by American troops on 1 September 1944, during the Second World War, resistance fighters took control of the town hall.
