= Croutoy =

- Commune
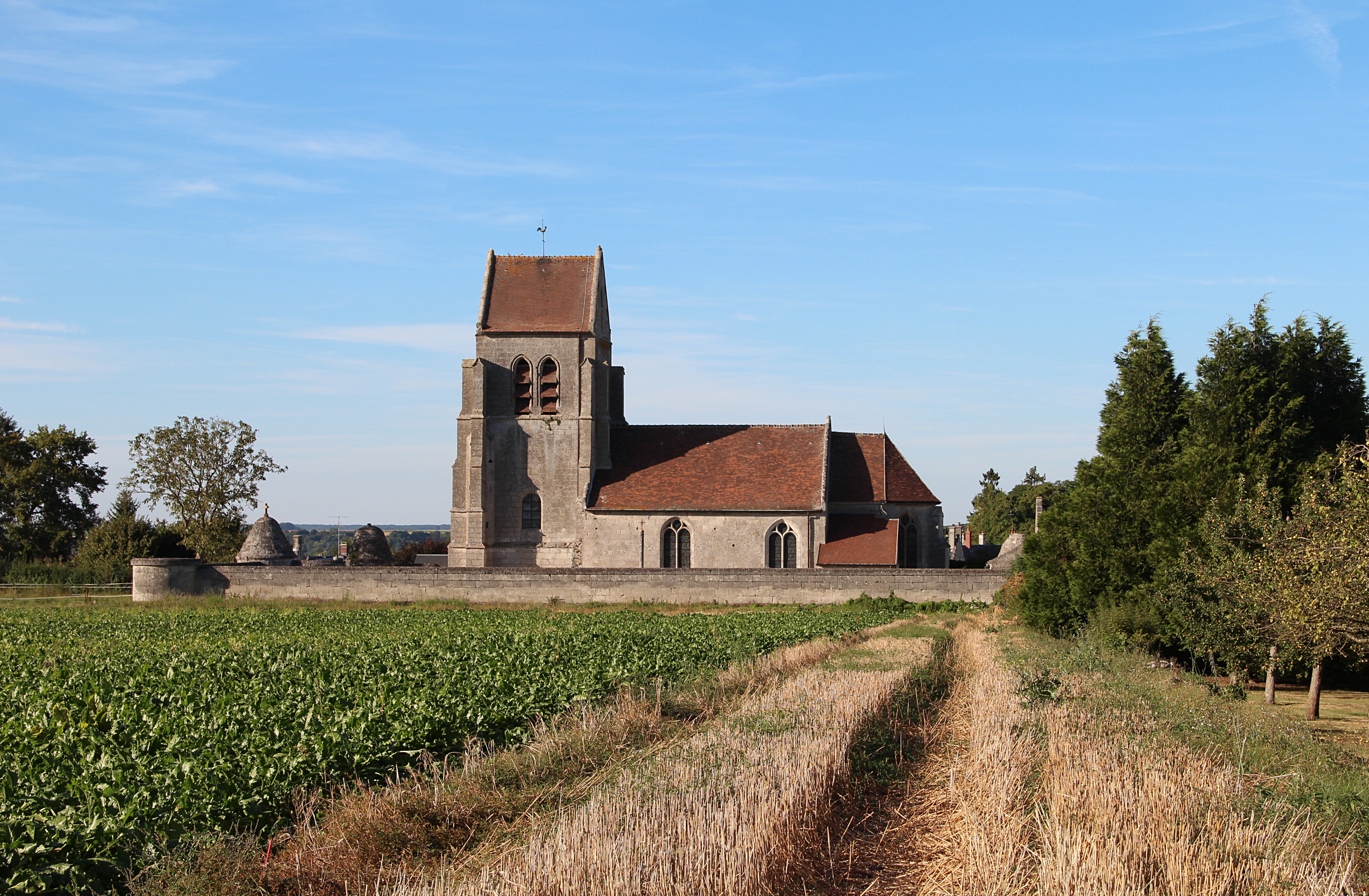
- The church in Croutoy
- Location of Croutoy
- Location within France Location within Hauts-de-France
- Coordinates: 49°23′13″N 3°02′33″E
- Country: France
- Region: Hauts-de-France
- Department: Oise
- Arrondissement: Compiègne
- Canton: Compiègne-2
- Intercommunality: Lisières de l'Oise

Government
  - Mayor (2020–2026): Guillain de France
- Area^{1}: 3.27 km^{2} (1.26 sq mi)
- Elevation: 130 m (430 ft)
- Highest elevation: 146 m (479 ft)
- Lowest elevation: 54 m (177 ft)
- Population (2023): 203
  - Density: 62.1/km^{2} (161/sq mi)
- Time zone: UTC+01:00 (CET)
  - Summer (DST): UTC+02:00 (CEST)
- INSEE/Postal code: 60184 /60350
- ^{1} French Land Register data, which excludes lakes, ponds, glaciers > 1 km^{2} (0.386 sq mi or 247 acres) and river estuaries.

Croutoy (French pronunciation: [kʁutwa]) is a commune in the Oise department in northern France.

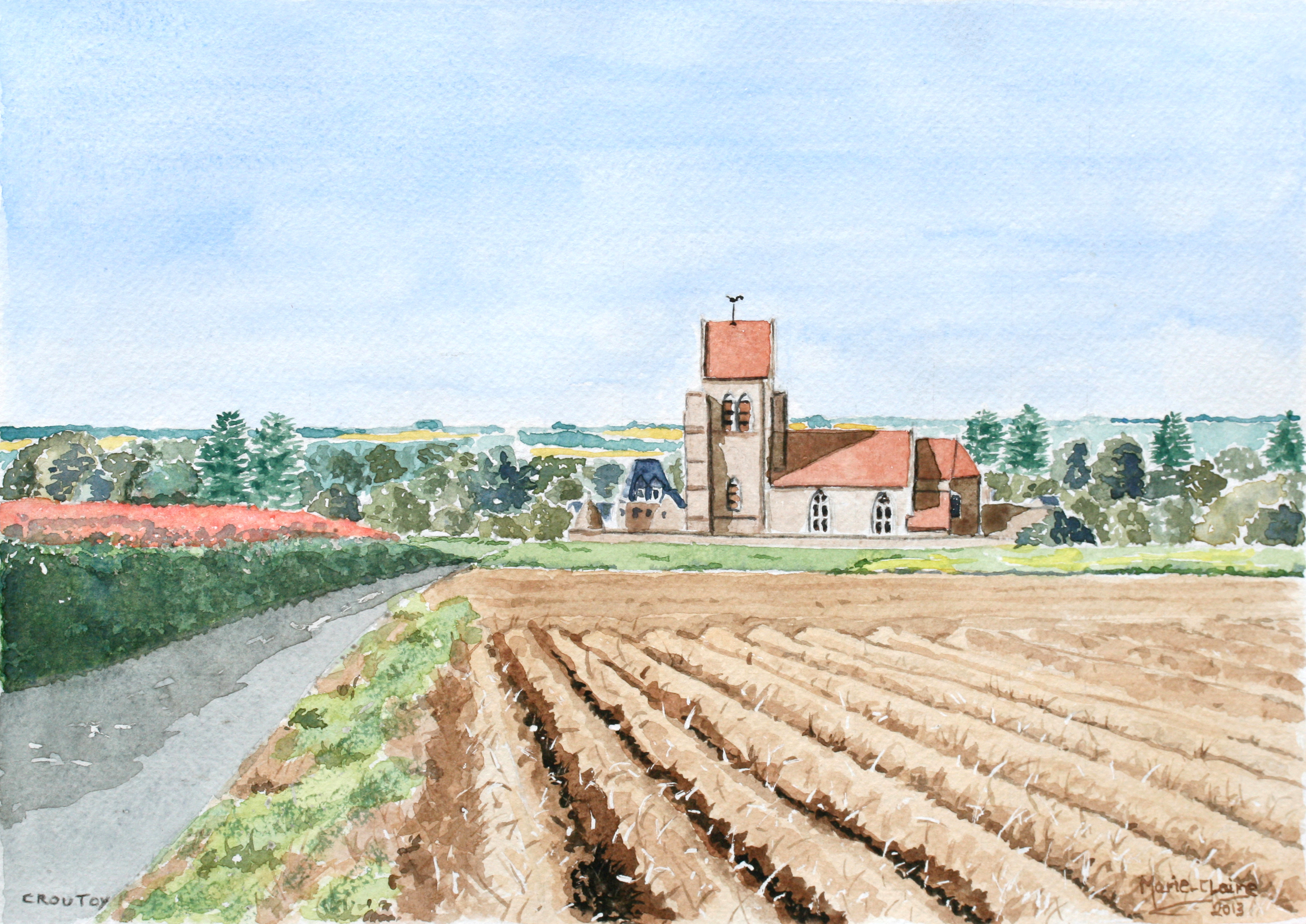
L'église Notre-Dame.

== See also ==
- Communes of the Oise department
