= Saint-Sauveur, Oise =

Saint-Sauveur
- Commune
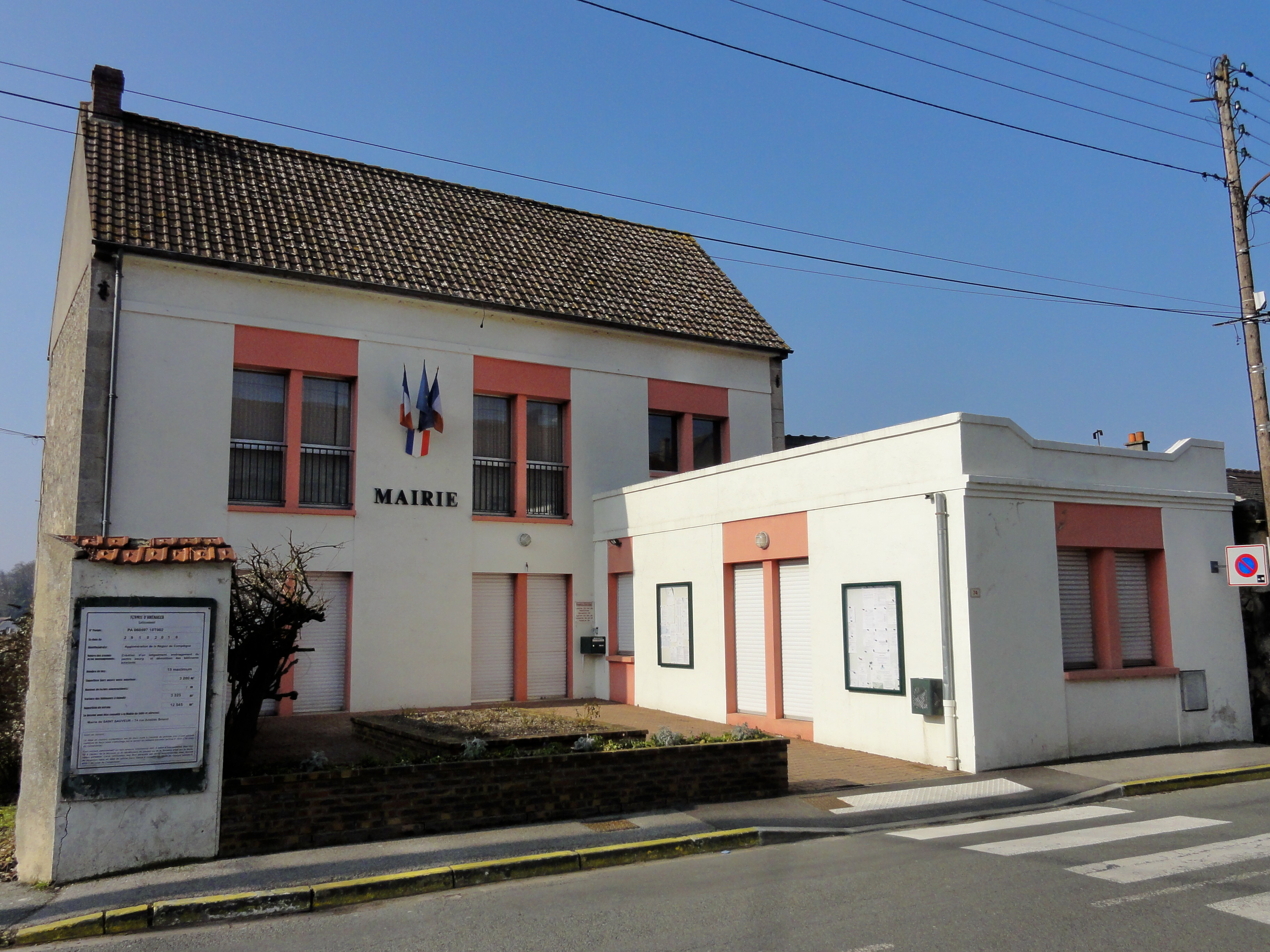
- The town hall in Saint-Sauveur
- Location of Saint-Sauveur
- Location within France Location within Hauts-de-France
- Coordinates: 49°19′09″N 2°47′02″E
- Country: France
- Region: Hauts-de-France
- Department: Oise
- Arrondissement: Compiègne
- Canton: Compiègne-2
- Intercommunality: CA Région de Compiègne et Basse Automne

Government
  - Mayor (2020–2026): Claude Lebon
- Area^{1}: 16.5 km^{2} (6.4 sq mi)
- Elevation: 58 m (190 ft)
- Highest elevation: 133 m (436 ft)
- Lowest elevation: 33 m (108 ft)
- Population (2023): 1,751
  - Density: 106/km^{2} (275/sq mi)
- Time zone: UTC+01:00 (CET)
  - Summer (DST): UTC+02:00 (CEST)
- INSEE/Postal code: 60597 /60320
- ^{1} French Land Register data, which excludes lakes, ponds, glaciers > 1 km^{2} (0.386 sq mi or 247 acres) and river estuaries.

Saint-Sauveur (French pronunciation: [sɛ̃ sovœʁ]) is a commune in the Oise department in northern France.

== Mineral water spring ==
Among the numerous ponds and springs which dot the surrounding Compiègne Forest, the Spring of Saint-Sauveur is widely regarded as therapeutic. The spring, which is a pair of two separate mineral water springs, runs both hot and cold and is reputed to provide relief for rheumatism and other ailments.

== See also ==
- Communes of the Oise department
