= Le Meux =

- Commune
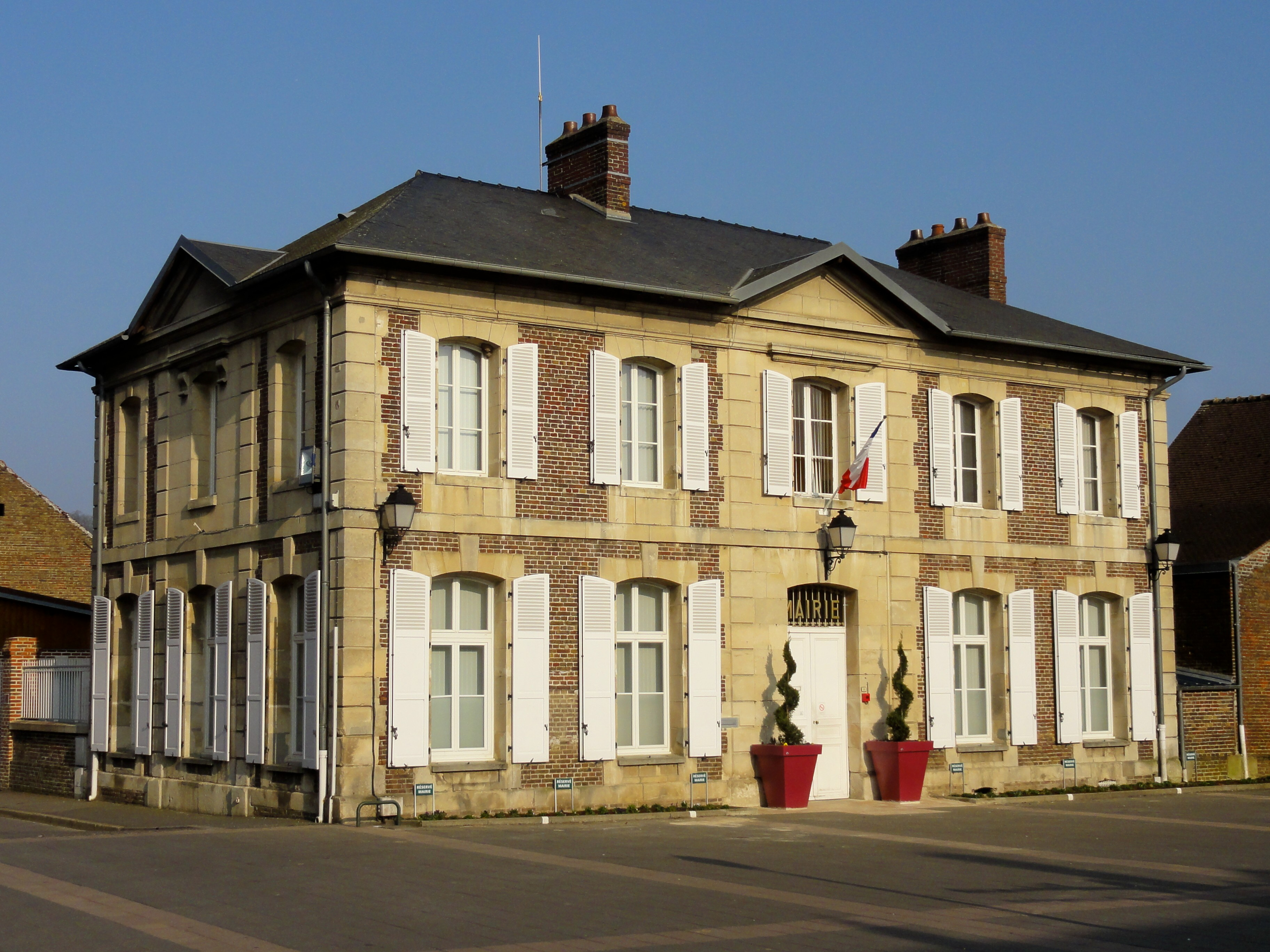
- The town hall in Le Meux

- Coat of arms
- Location of Le Meux
- Location within France Location within Hauts-de-France
- Coordinates: 49°22′06″N 2°44′43″E
- Country: France
- Region: Hauts-de-France
- Department: Oise
- Arrondissement: Compiègne
- Canton: Compiègne-2
- Intercommunality: CA Région de Compiègne et Basse Automne

Government
  - Mayor (2020–2026): Evelyne Le Chapellier
- Area^{1}: 7.8 km^{2} (3.0 sq mi)
- Highest elevation: 122 m (400 ft)
- Lowest elevation: 30 m (98 ft)
- Population (2023): 2,327
  - Density: 300/km^{2} (770/sq mi)
- Time zone: UTC+01:00 (CET)
  - Summer (DST): UTC+02:00 (CEST)
- INSEE/Postal code: 60402 /60880
- ^{1} French Land Register data, which excludes lakes, ponds, glaciers > 1 km^{2} (0.386 sq mi or 247 acres) and river estuaries.

Le Meux (French pronunciation: [lə mø]) is a commune in the Oise department in northern France.

== Population ==
Historical population
Year	Pop.	±% p.a.
1968	723	—
1975	768	+0.87%
1982	998	+3.81%
1990	1,471	+4.97%
1999	1,708	+1.67%
2007	2,036	+2.22%
2012	2,060	+0.23%
2017	2,270	+1.96%
2023	2,327	+0.41%
Source: INSEE

== See also ==
- Communes of the Oise department
