= Communauté d'agglomération de la Région de Compiègne et de la Basse Automne =

Région de Compiègne et Basse Automne
- Communauté d'agglomération
- Interactive map of Région de Compiègne et Basse Automne
- Coordinates: 49°25′N 02°50′E
- Country: France
- Region: Hauts-de-France
- Department: Oise
- No. of communes: {{{nbcomm}}}
- Established: 2017
- Area: 263.8 km^{2} (101.9 sq mi)
- Population (2019): 83,159
  - Density: 315.2/km^{2} (816.5/sq mi)
- Website: www.agglo-compiegne.fr

Communauté d'agglomération de la Région de Compiègne et de la Basse Automne is the communauté d'agglomération, an intercommunal structure, centred on the city of Compiègne. It is located in the Oise department, in the Hauts-de-France region, northern France. Created in 2017, its seat is in Compiègne. Its area is 263.8 km^{2}. Its population was 83,159 in 2019, of which 40,615 in Compiègne proper.

== Composition ==
The communauté d'agglomération consists of the following 22 communes:

1. Armancourt
2. Béthisy-Saint-Martin
3. Béthisy-Saint-Pierre
4. Bienville
5. Choisy-au-Bac
6. Clairoix
7. Compiègne
8. Janville
9. Jaux
10. Jonquières
11. Lachelle
12. Lacroix-Saint-Ouen
13. Le Meux
14. Margny-lès-Compiègne
15. Néry
16. Saintines
17. Saint-Jean-aux-Bois
18. Saint-Sauveur
19. Saint-Vaast-de-Longmont
20. Venette
21. Verberie
22. Vieux-Moulin
