= Jonquières, Oise =

Jonquières
- Commune
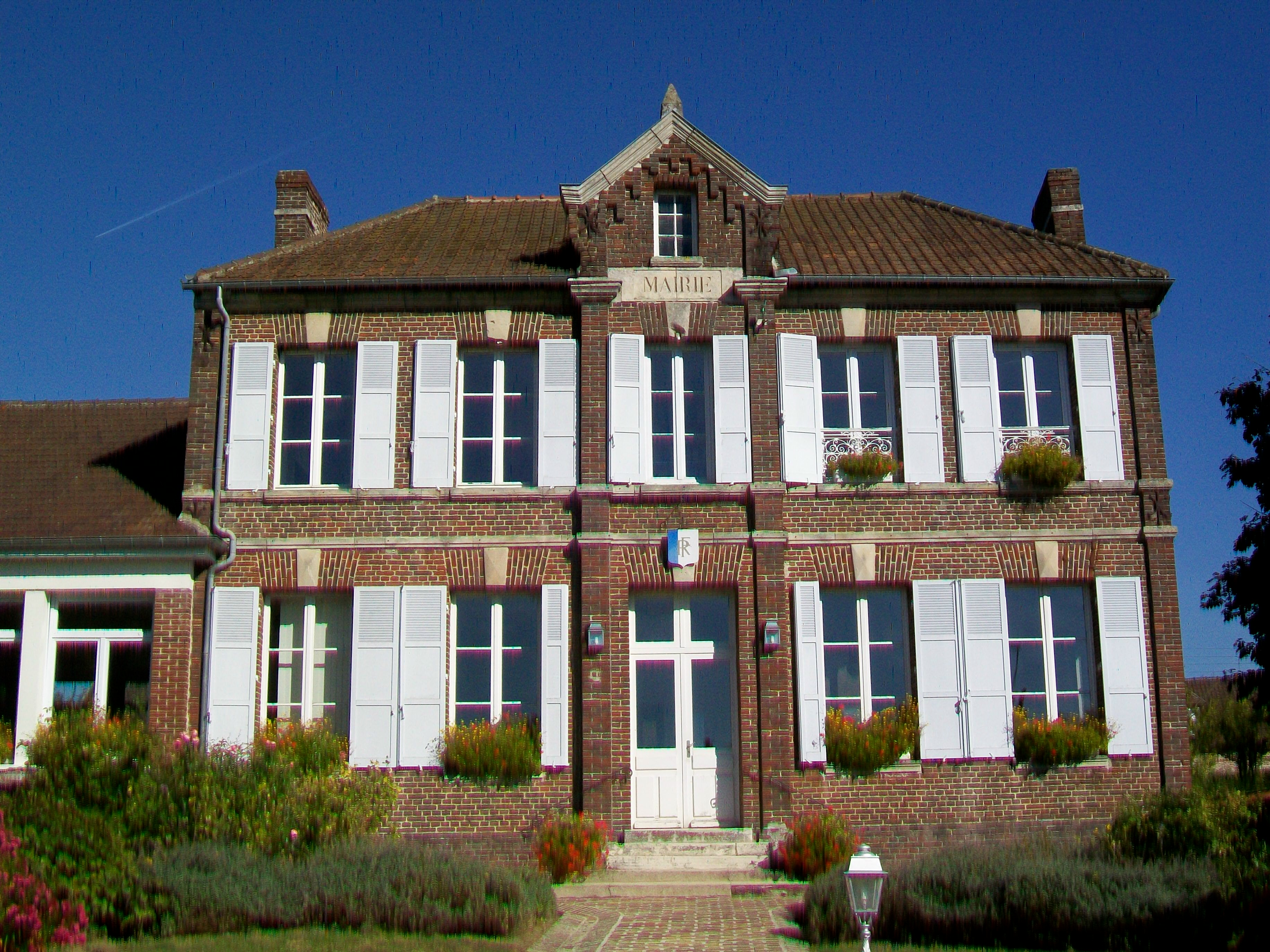
- The town hall in Jonquières
- Location of Jonquières
- Location within France Location within Hauts-de-France
- Coordinates: 49°23′26″N 2°43′52″E
- Country: France
- Region: Hauts-de-France
- Department: Oise
- Arrondissement: Compiègne
- Canton: Compiègne-2
- Intercommunality: CA Région de Compiègne et Basse Automne

Government
  - Mayor (2020–2026): Jean-Claude Chireux
- Area^{1}: 7.32 km^{2} (2.83 sq mi)
- Elevation: 90 m (300 ft)
- Highest elevation: 153 m (502 ft)
- Lowest elevation: 55 m (180 ft)
- Population (2023): 588
  - Density: 80.3/km^{2} (208/sq mi)
- Time zone: UTC+01:00 (CET)
  - Summer (DST): UTC+02:00 (CEST)
- INSEE/Postal code: 60326 /60680
- ^{1} French Land Register data, which excludes lakes, ponds, glaciers > 1 km^{2} (0.386 sq mi or 247 acres) and river estuaries.

Jonquières (French pronunciation: [ʒɔ̃kjɛʁ]) is a commune in the Oise department in northern France.

== See also ==
- Communes of the Oise department
