= Saint-Jean-aux-Bois, Oise =

Saint-Jean-aux-Bois
- Commune
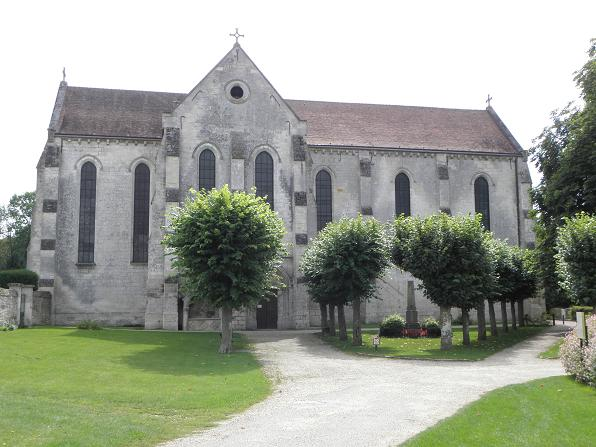
- The church in Saint-Jean-aux-Bois

- Coat of arms
- Location of Saint-Jean-aux-Bois
- Location within France Location within Hauts-de-France
- Coordinates: 49°20′55″N 2°54′18″E
- Country: France
- Region: Hauts-de-France
- Department: Oise
- Arrondissement: Compiègne
- Canton: Compiègne-2
- Intercommunality: CA Région de Compiègne et Basse Automne

Government
  - Mayor (2020–2026): Jean-Pierre Leboeuf
- Area^{1}: 25.21 km^{2} (9.73 sq mi)
- Elevation: 71 m (233 ft)
- Highest elevation: 138 m (453 ft)
- Lowest elevation: 38 m (125 ft)
- Population (2023): 345
  - Density: 13.7/km^{2} (35.4/sq mi)
- Demonym: Solitaires
- Time zone: UTC+01:00 (CET)
  - Summer (DST): UTC+02:00 (CEST)
- INSEE/Postal code: 60579 /60350
- ^{1} French Land Register data, which excludes lakes, ponds, glaciers > 1 km^{2} (0.386 sq mi or 247 acres) and river estuaries.

Saint-Jean-aux-Bois (French pronunciation: [sɛ̃ ʒɑ̃ o bwa]) is a commune in the Oise department in northern France.

== See also ==
- Communes of the Oise department
