= Lacroix-Saint-Ouen =

- Commune
- Coat of arms
- Location of Lacroix-Saint-Ouen
- Location within France Location within Hauts-de-France
- Coordinates: 49°21′16″N 2°47′10″E
- Country: France
- Region: Hauts-de-France
- Department: Oise
- Arrondissement: Compiègne
- Canton: Compiègne-2
- Intercommunality: CA Région de Compiègne et Basse Automne

Government
  - Mayor (2020–2026): Jean Desessart
- Area^{1}: 20.83 km^{2} (8.04 sq mi)
- Highest elevation: 54 m (177 ft)
- Lowest elevation: 30 m (98 ft)
- Population (2023): 5,415
  - Density: 260.0/km^{2} (673.3/sq mi)
- Time zone: UTC+01:00 (CET)
  - Summer (DST): UTC+02:00 (CEST)
- INSEE/Postal code: 60338 /60610
- ^{1} French Land Register data, which excludes lakes, ponds, glaciers > 1 km^{2} (0.386 sq mi or 247 acres) and river estuaries.

Lacroix-Saint-Ouen (French pronunciation: [lakʁwa sɛ̃.t‿wɛ̃]) is a commune in the Oise department in northern France.

It lies 75 km north of Paris.

== Population ==
The inhabitants are called the Croisés-Saintodoniens in French.

Historical population

| Year | Pop. | ±% p.a. |
|---|---|---|
| 1793 | 800 | — |
| 1821 | 1,084 | +1.09% |
| 1846 | 1,250 | +0.57% |
| 1872 | 1,375 | +0.37% |
| 1901 | 1,679 | +0.69% |
| 1926 | 1,673 | −0.01% |
| 1946 | 1,931 | +0.72% |
| 1962 | 2,330 | +1.18% |
| 1968 | 2,558 | +1.57% |

| Year | Pop. | ±% p.a. |
|---|---|---|
| 1975 | 3,203 | +3.26% |
| 1982 | 3,475 | +1.17% |
| 1990 | 3,754 | +0.97% |
| 1999 | 4,233 | +1.34% |
| 2007 | 4,451 | +0.63% |
| 2012 | 4,368 | −0.38% |
| 2017 | 4,708 | +1.51% |
| 2023 | 5,415 | +2.36% |

Source: EHESS and INSEE (1968–2023)

== See also ==
- Communes of the Oise department
