= Armancourt, Oise =

Armancourt
- Commune
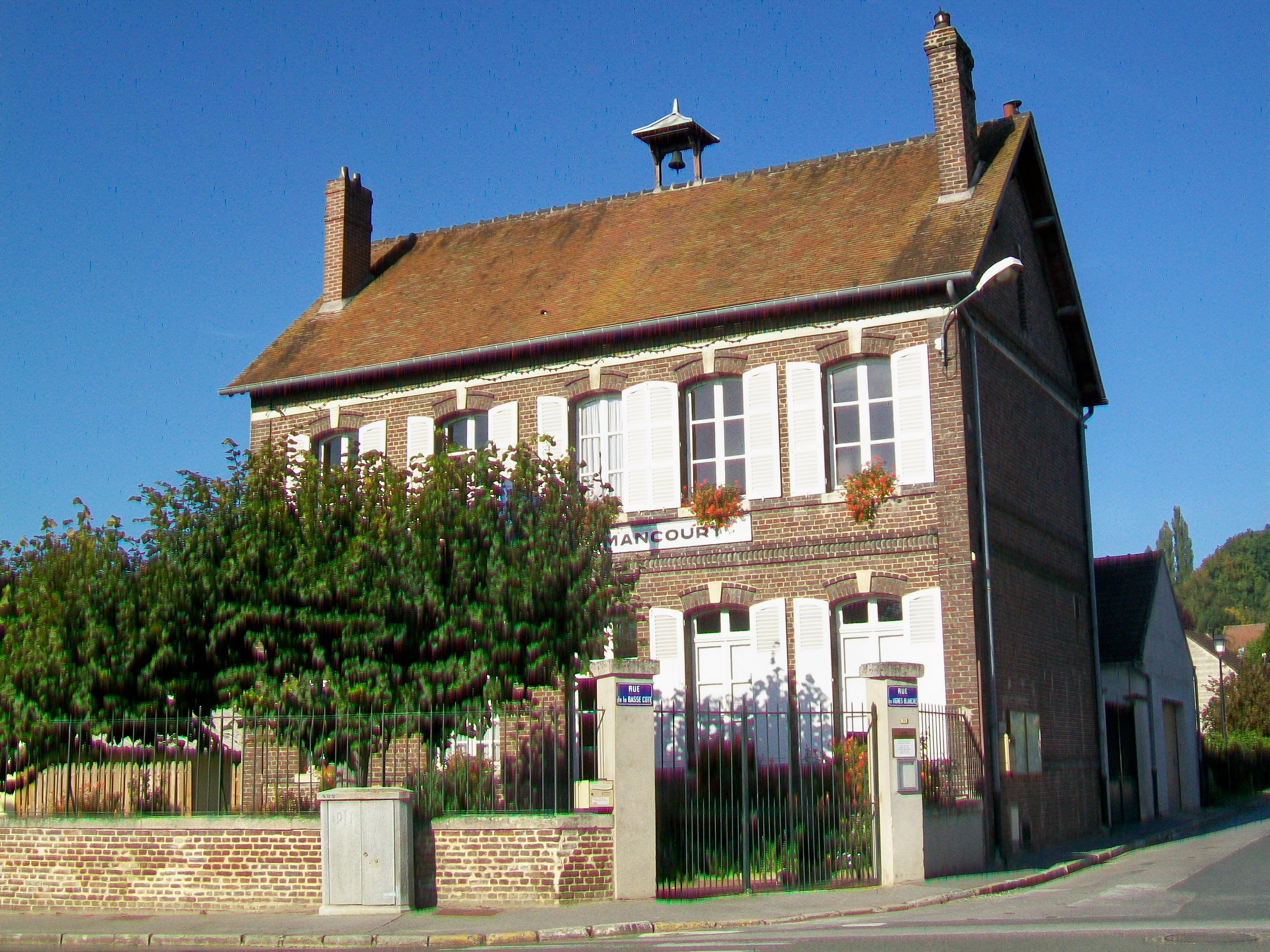
- The town hall in Armancourt
- Location of Armancourt
- Location within France Location within Hauts-de-France
- Coordinates: 49°22′26″N 2°45′54″E
- Country: France
- Region: Hauts-de-France
- Department: Oise
- Arrondissement: Compiègne
- Canton: Compiègne-2
- Intercommunality: CA Région de Compiègne et Basse Automne

Government
  - Mayor (2020–2026): Éric Bertrand
- Area^{1}: 2.03 km^{2} (0.78 sq mi)
- Elevation: 203 m (666 ft)
- Highest elevation: 112 m (367 ft)
- Lowest elevation: 30 m (98 ft)
- Population (2023): 548
  - Density: 270/km^{2} (699/sq mi)
- Time zone: UTC+01:00 (CET)
  - Summer (DST): UTC+02:00 (CEST)
- INSEE/Postal code: 60023 /60880
- ^{1} French Land Register data, which excludes lakes, ponds, glaciers > 1 km^{2} (0.386 sq mi or 247 acres) and river estuaries.

Armancourt (French pronunciation: [aʁmɑ̃kuʁ]) is a commune in the Oise department in northern France.

== Population ==
Historical population
Year	Pop.	±% p.a.
1968	159	—
1975	244	+6.31%
1982	472	+9.88%
1990	501	+0.75%
1999	527	+0.56%
2007	536	+0.21%
2012	558	+0.81%
2017	563	+0.18%
2023	548	−0.45%
Source: INSEE

== See also ==
- Communes of the Oise department
