= Pierrefonds, Oise =

Pierrefonds
- Commune
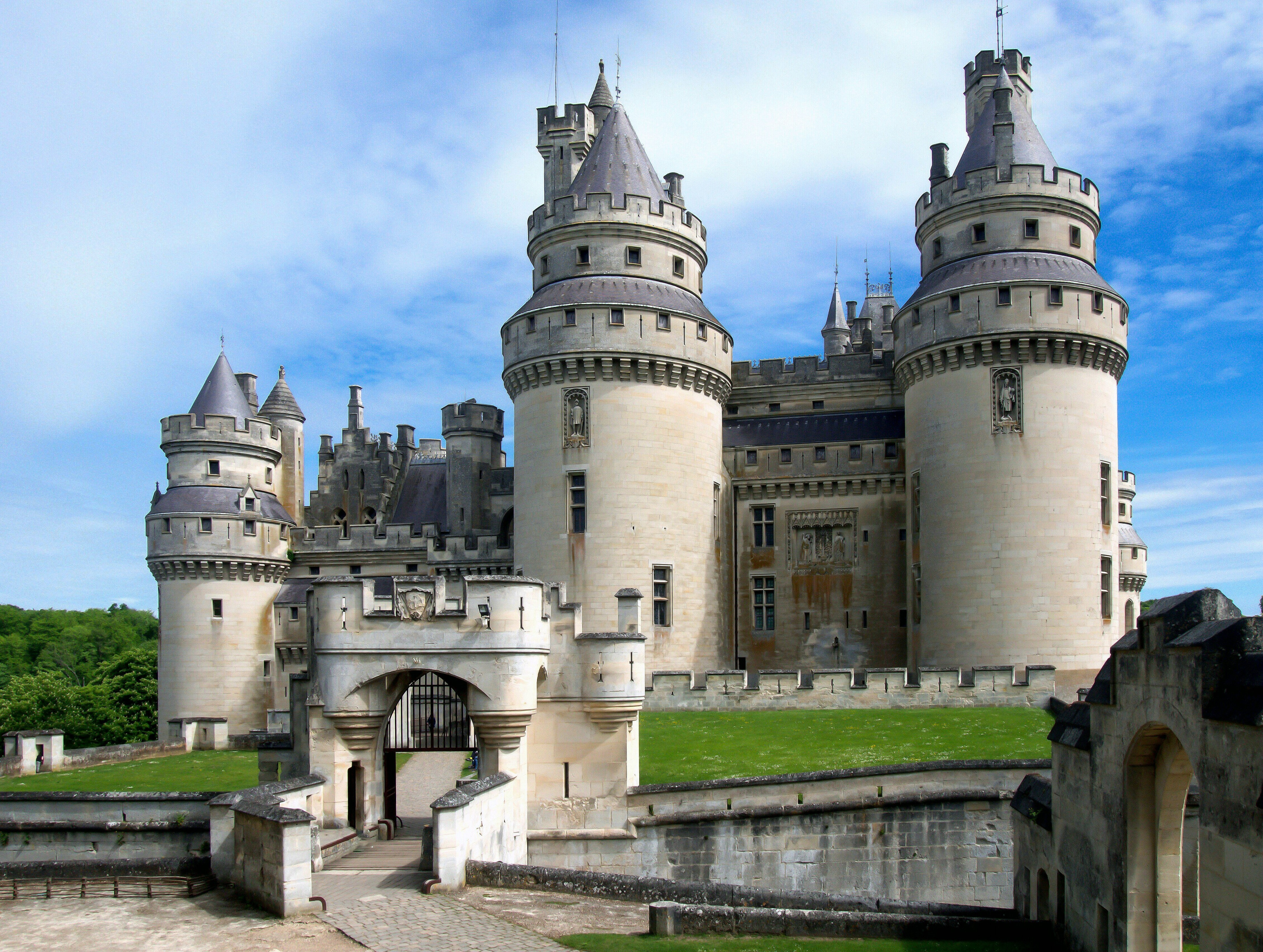
- Château de Pierrefonds

- Coat of arms
- Location of Pierrefonds
- Location within France Location within Hauts-de-France
- Coordinates: 49°21′06″N 2°58′53″E
- Country: France
- Region: Hauts-de-France
- Department: Oise
- Arrondissement: Compiègne
- Canton: Compiègne-2

Government
  - Mayor (2020–2026): Florence Demouy
- Area^{1}: 22.32 km^{2} (8.62 sq mi)
- Elevation: 81 m (266 ft)
- Highest elevation: 144 m (472 ft)
- Lowest elevation: 55 m (180 ft)
- Population (2023): 1,877
  - Density: 84.09/km^{2} (217.8/sq mi)
- Time zone: UTC+01:00 (CET)
  - Summer (DST): UTC+02:00 (CEST)
- INSEE/Postal code: 60491 /60350
- ^{1} French Land Register data, which excludes lakes, ponds, glaciers > 1 km^{2} (0.386 sq mi or 247 acres) and river estuaries.

Pierrefonds (French pronunciation: [pjɛʁfɔ̃]) is a commune in the French department of Oise, Hauts-de-France, northern France, known for its Château de Pierrefonds.

== History ==
The lords of Pierrefonds in the Middle Ages were:

- Nivelon I (1047–1073)
- Nivelon II (1073–1102)
- Dreux (1102–1160)
- Nivelon III (1160–1161)
- Agatha (1161–1192)
  - Conon, Count of Soissons (1161–1182), her husband
- Gaucher III of Châtillon (1192–1193), her cousin

Pierrefonds was sold to the crown in 1193.

== Demography ==
Historical population
Year	Pop.	±% p.a.
1968	1,531	—
1975	1,474	−0.54%
1982	1,376	−0.98%
1990	1,548	+1.48%
1999	1,945	+2.57%
2007	2,033	+0.55%
2012	1,874	−1.62%
2017	1,808	−0.71%
2023	1,877	+0.63%
Source: INSEE

== See also ==
- Communes of the Oise department
