= Cuise-la-Motte =

- Commune
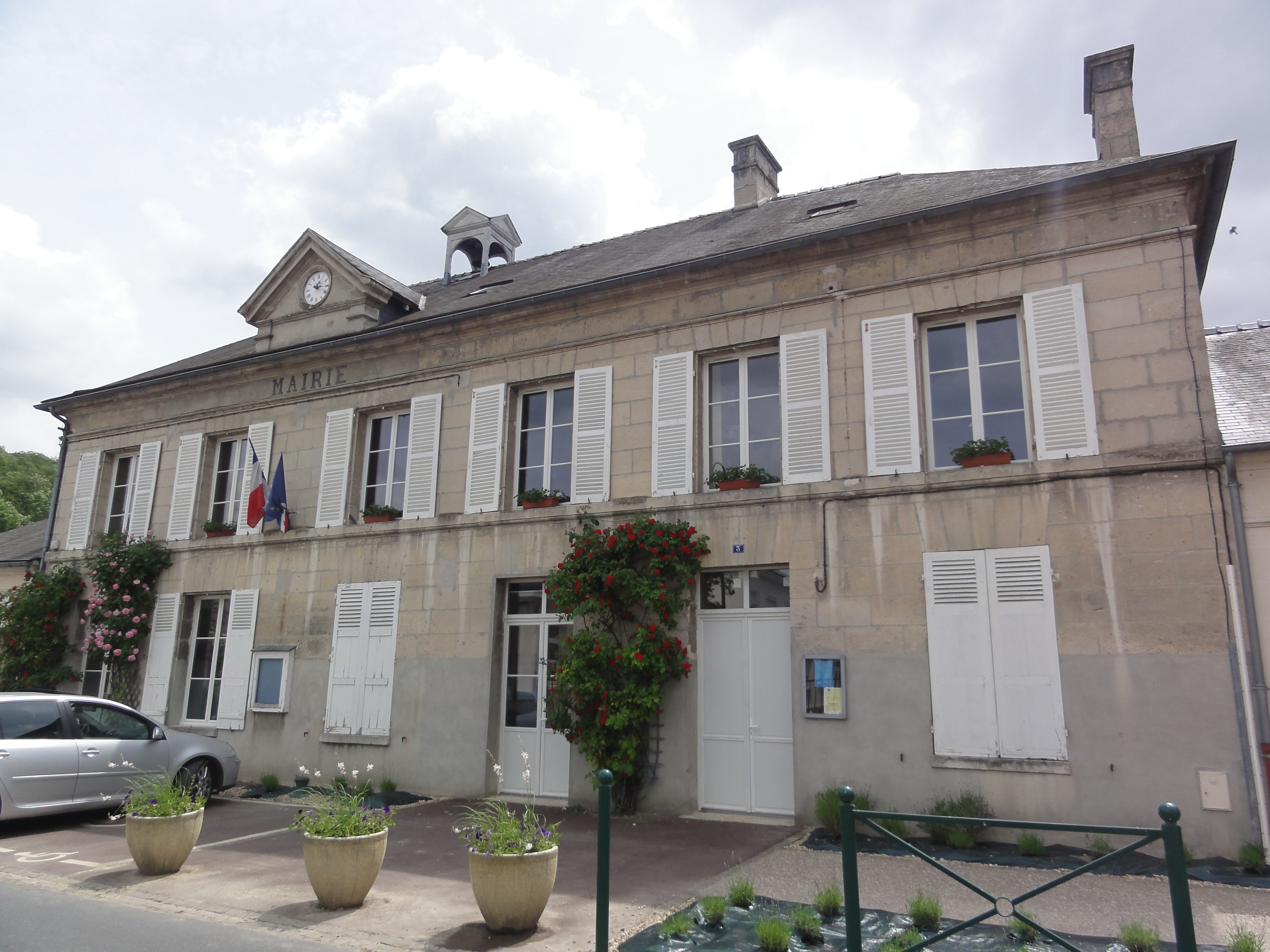
- The town hall in Cuise-la-Motte

- Coat of arms
- Location of Cuise-la-Motte
- Location within France Location within Hauts-de-France
- Coordinates: 49°23′14″N 3°00′26″E
- Country: France
- Region: Hauts-de-France
- Department: Oise
- Arrondissement: Compiègne
- Canton: Compiègne-2

Government
  - Mayor (2020–2026): Renaud Bourgeois
- Area^{1}: 10.05 km^{2} (3.88 sq mi)
- Elevation: 100 m (330 ft)
- Highest elevation: 144 m (472 ft)
- Lowest elevation: 36 m (118 ft)
- Population (2023): 2,042
  - Density: 203.2/km^{2} (526.2/sq mi)
- Time zone: UTC+01:00 (CET)
  - Summer (DST): UTC+02:00 (CEST)
- INSEE/Postal code: 60188 /60350
- ^{1} French Land Register data, which excludes lakes, ponds, glaciers > 1 km^{2} (0.386 sq mi or 247 acres) and river estuaries.

Cuise-la-Motte (French pronunciation: [kɥiz la mɔt]) is a commune in the Oise department in northern France. It has a thriving L'Arche community, which was founded in the nearby town of Trosly-Breuil.

== Population ==
Historical population
| Year | Pop. | ±% p.a. |
|---|---|---|
| 1968 | 1,501 | — |
| 1975 | 1,905 | +3.46% |
| 1982 | 2,091 | +1.34% |
| 1990 | 2,381 | +1.64% |
| 1999 | 2,241 | −0.67% |
| 2007 | 2,210 | −0.17% |
| 2012 | 2,148 | −0.57% |
| 2017 | 2,192 | +0.41% |
| 2023 | 2,042 | −1.17% |
Source: INSEE

== See also ==
- Communes of the Oise department
