= Vieux-Moulin, Oise =

Vieux-Moulin
- Commune
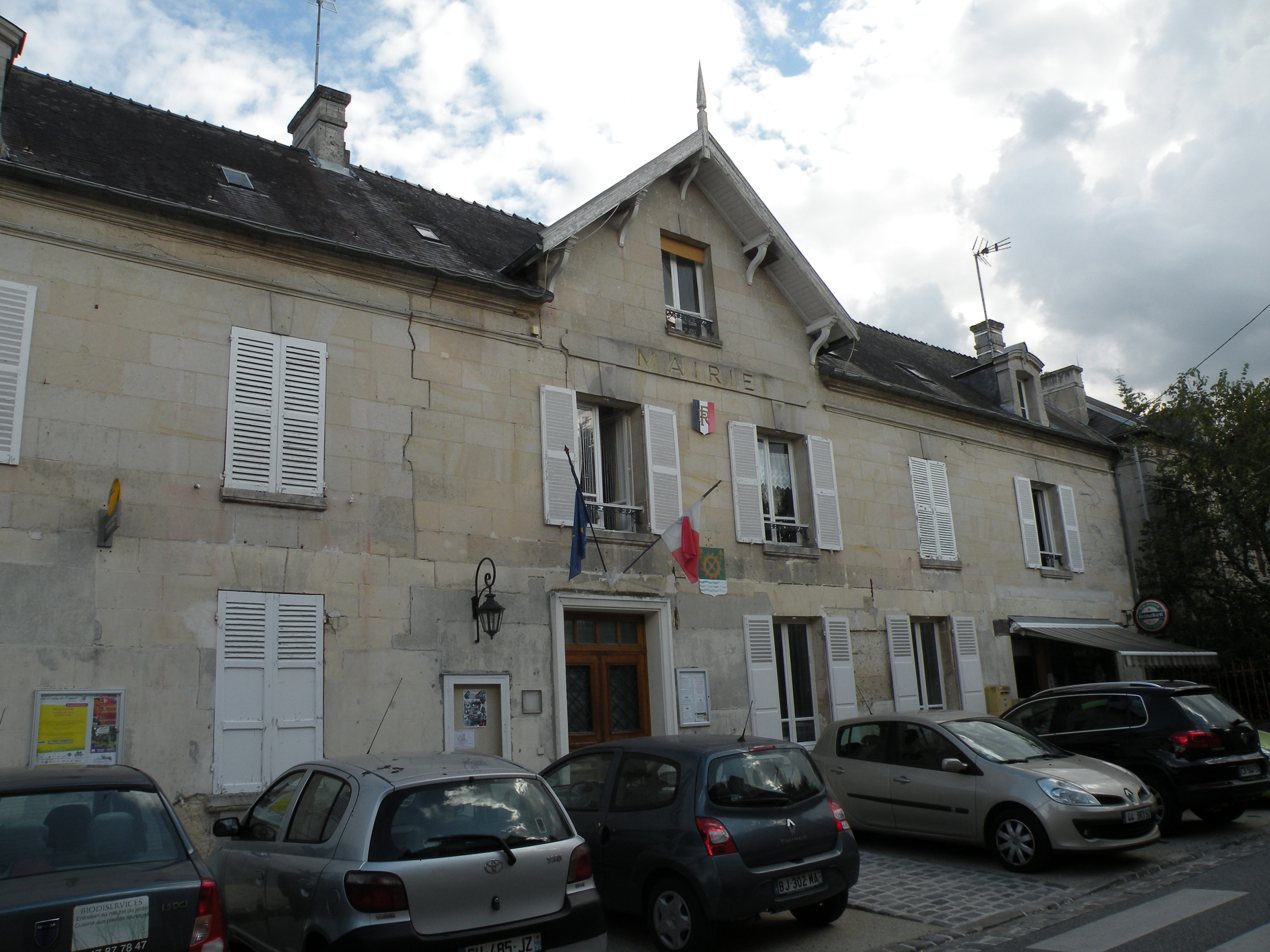
- The town hall in Vieux-Moulin
- Location of Vieux-Moulin
- Location within France Location within Hauts-de-France
- Coordinates: 49°23′35″N 2°55′57″E
- Country: France
- Region: Hauts-de-France
- Department: Oise
- Arrondissement: Compiègne
- Canton: Compiègne-2
- Intercommunality: CA Région de Compiègne et Basse Automne
- Area^{1}: 17.65 km^{2} (6.81 sq mi)
- Elevation: 49 m (161 ft)
- Highest elevation: 130 m (430 ft)
- Lowest elevation: 35 m (115 ft)
- Population (2023): 593
  - Density: 33.6/km^{2} (87.0/sq mi)
- Time zone: UTC+01:00 (CET)
  - Summer (DST): UTC+02:00 (CEST)
- INSEE/Postal code: 60674 /60350
- ^{1} French Land Register data, which excludes lakes, ponds, glaciers > 1 km^{2} (0.386 sq mi or 247 acres) and river estuaries.

Vieux-Moulin (French pronunciation: [vjø mulɛ̃]) is a commune in the Oise department in northern France.

== See also ==
- Communes of the Oise department
