= Béthisy-Saint-Pierre =

- Commune
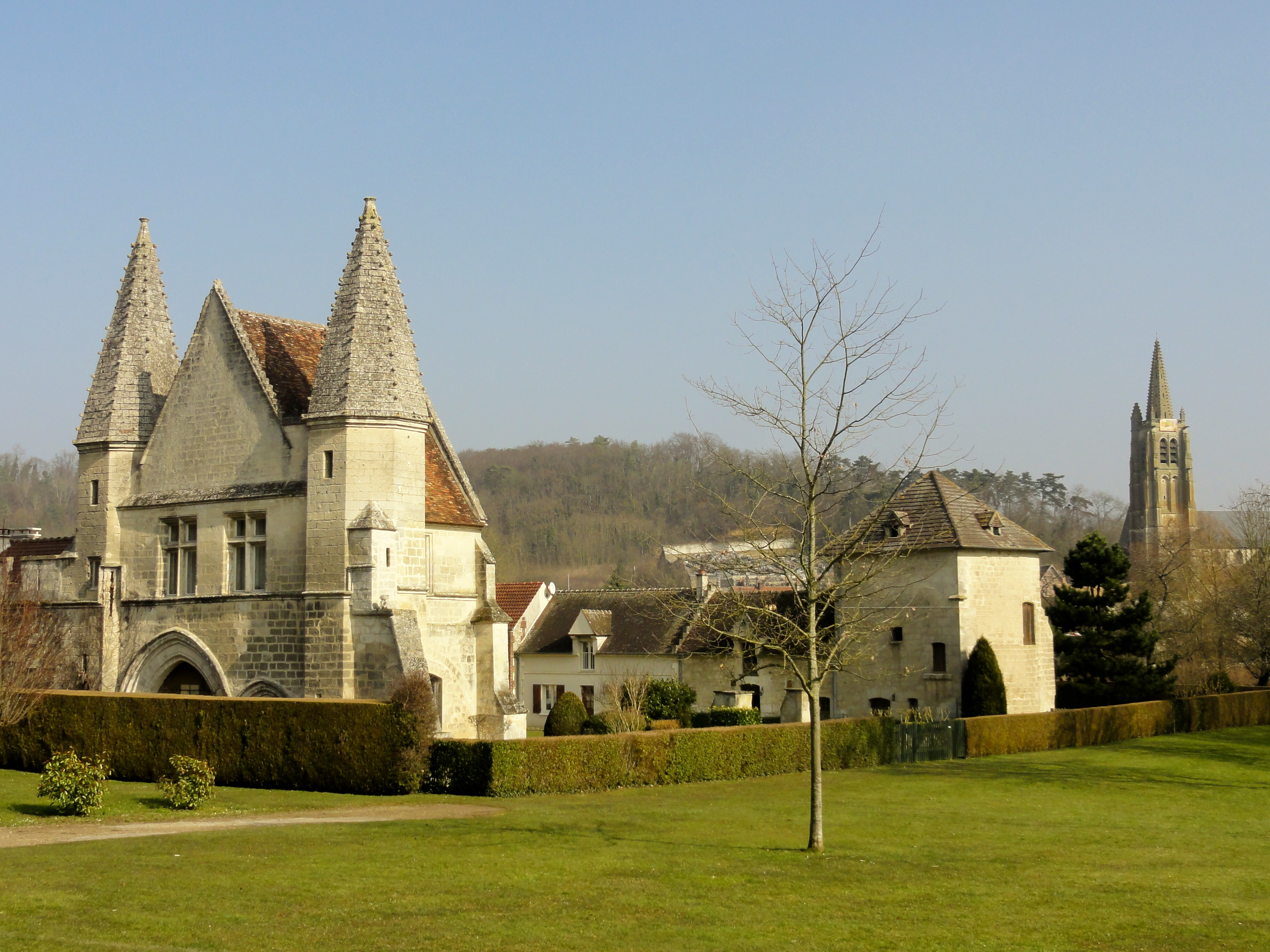
- The chateau and church in Béthisy-Saint-Pierre
- Location of Béthisy-Saint-Pierre
- Location within France Location within Hauts-de-France
- Coordinates: 49°18′07″N 2°48′14″E
- Country: France
- Region: Hauts-de-France
- Department: Oise
- Arrondissement: Senlis
- Canton: Crépy-en-Valois
- Intercommunality: CA Région de Compiègne et Basse Automne

Government
  - Mayor (2020–2026): Jean-Marie Lavoisier
- Area^{1}: 6.53 km^{2} (2.52 sq mi)
- Elevation: 48 m (157 ft)
- Highest elevation: 132 m (433 ft)
- Lowest elevation: 35 m (115 ft)
- Population (2023): 3,111
  - Density: 476/km^{2} (1,230/sq mi)
- Time zone: UTC+01:00 (CET)
  - Summer (DST): UTC+02:00 (CEST)
- INSEE/Postal code: 60068 /60320
- ^{1} French Land Register data, which excludes lakes, ponds, glaciers > 1 km^{2} (0.386 sq mi or 247 acres) and river estuaries.

Béthisy-Saint-Pierre (French pronunciation: [betizi sɛ̃ pjɛʁ]) is a commune in the Oise department in northern France.

== Population ==
Historical population

Year	Pop.	±% p.a.
1793	827	—
1821	1,237	+1.45%
1846	1,633	+1.12%
1872	1,587	−0.11%
1901	1,810	+0.45%
1926	1,899	+0.19%
1946	1,759	−0.38%
1962	1,994	+0.79%
1968	2,263	+2.13%

Year	Pop.	±% p.a.
1975	2,818	+3.18%
1982	3,034	+1.06%
1990	3,140	+0.43%
1999	3,135	−0.02%
2007	3,124	−0.04%
2012	3,247	+0.78%
2017	3,078	−1.06%
2023	3,111	+0.18%

Source: EHESS and INSEE (1968-2023)

== See also ==
- Communes of the Oise department
