= Charles Huntziger =

General in French Army (1880–1941)

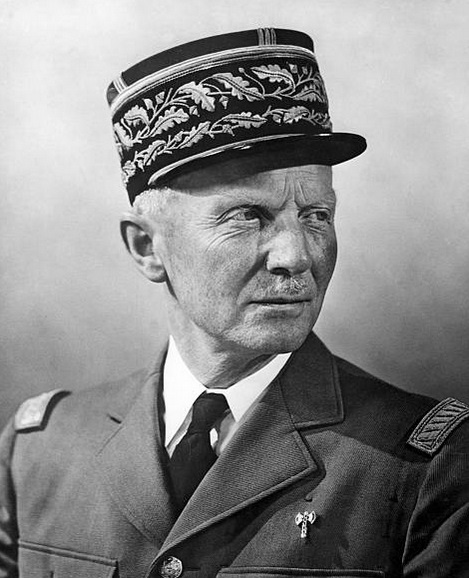
- General Huntziger in 1941

Minister of War
- In office 6 September 1940 – 12 November 1941
- Prime Minister: Philippe Pétain
- Preceded by: Louis Colson [fr]
- Succeeded by: François Darlan (interim)

Commander-in-Chief of the Armistice Army
- In office 6 September 1940 – 12 November 1941
- Prime Minister: Philippe Pétain
- Preceded by: Maxime Weygand
- Succeeded by: François Darlan (interim)

Personal details
- Born: 25 June 1880 Lesneven, France
- Died: 12 November 1941 (aged 61) Bréau, Vichy France
- Cause of death: Plane accident
- Spouse: Marie Alice Maurin (m.1909)
- Children: Yvonne Huntziger; Jacques Huntziger

Military service
- Allegiance: French Third Republic; Vichy France
- Branch/service: French Army; Armistice Army
- Years of service: 1898–1941
- Rank: Général d'armée
- Battles/wars: First World War; Second Battle of Champagne; Battle of Skra-di-Legen; Vardar offensive; Second World War; Battle of France; Battle of Sedan
- Awards: Order of the Francisque; Legion of Honour (Grand officier); Et al.

Charles Léon Clément Huntziger (French: [ʃaʁl œ̃tsiʒe]; 25 June 1880 – 12 November 1941) was a French Army general best known for his role in the Battle of Sedan in May 1940 and as Minister of War of Vichy France until his death in a plane accident in 1941. He also headed the French delegations to the Franco-German and Franco-Italian armistice negotiations in June 1940, signing them on behalf of France.

Huntziger distinguished himself during the First World War as head of operations for the Allied Army of the Orient on the Macedonian front from January 1918, where he served as a key architect behind the Vardar offensive that knocked Bulgaria out of the war that September. Between 1924 and 1928, he commanded French troops in the French concession in Tianjin before heading the French military mission to Brazil from 1930 to 1934. Between 1934 and 1938, Huntziger commanded French troops in the Levant, where he assisted in negotiating the 1936 Franco-Lebanese and Franco-Syrian independence treaties.

In command of the Second Army during the Battle of France, he was faced with the Schwerpunkt (main effort) of the German offensive through the Ardennes. Overwhelmed at Sedan, Huntziger opted to cover the rear of the Maginot Line, leaving the way clear for the German Panzer divisions to advance northwards to the English Channel. The decisions Huntziger made leading up to and during the battle have been criticised by historians. Alongside his ministerial position, Huntziger also served as commander-in-chief of the Armistice Army. Though largely forgotten, he remains a controversial figure in France.

== Early life and education ==
Charles Léon Clément Huntziger was born in Lesneven, Finistère on 25 June 1880 to Léon Jacques Huntziger (b.1853), a music and German teacher, and Marie Élise Julie Manière. Following the Franco-Prussian War, his father had emigrated from Alsace in 1871 to avoid conscription into the German army.

In 1896, Huntziger enrolled at the Lycée of Nantes on a national scholarship and as a boarder, where he studied elementary mathematics. After receiving his baccalauréat, he prepared for Saint-Cyr to which he was admitted in 1898.

== Early military career ==
Upon leaving Saint-Cyr in 1900 as a second lieutenant, Huntziger joined the colonial infantry, specifically the 2nd Colonial Infantry Regiment garrisoned in Brest. In 1902, he was assigned to the 2nd Malagasy Tirailleurs Regiment [fr] in Madagascar as commander of the sub-sector of Andemaka. He transferred to the 3rd Senegalese Tirailleurs Regiment [fr] in June 1903 and returned to the 2nd Colonial Infantry Regiment in France at the end of 1904, after his end-of-campaign leave. In November 1905, Huntziger was assigned to the 2nd Senegalese Tirailleurs Regiment in Upper Senegal and Niger. He finished his stay in July 1907 and was assigned to the 21st Colonial Infantry Regiment in Paris in February 1908, entering the War College (ESG) in autumn 1909 after completing required training with the 1st Colonial Infantry Regiment.

On 30 June 1909, Huntziger married Marie Alice Maurin who was the daughter of Jean Félix Albert Maurin, the quartermaster general at the Ministry of War. He graduated from the ESG in 1911, being promoted to the rank of capitaine in September, and began his staff internship in the 4th Army Corps in Le Mans. Huntziger was sent to Indochina in 1912, where he finished his internship at the High Command of Indochina in Hanoi. In December 1913, he assumed command of the 2nd company of the 1st Tonkinese Tirailleurs Regiment [fr], where he remained at the outbreak of the First World War.

=== First World War ===
At Huntziger's request he was transferred back to France, assuming command of a company of the 6th Colonial Battalion in Morocco in November 1914. Upon arriving in France, he was sent to the front on the Somme where he distinguished himself and earned a citation to the order of the army [fr] in December. In January 1915, he was assigned to the staff of the 24th Infantry Division [fr] in Champagne and Lorraine. In June, he was transferred to the 2nd Colonial Army Corps [fr] and was in charge of supplies during the Champagne offensive in September, for which he was made a knight of the Legion of Honour the following month. Huntziger became head of the 3rd Bureau (operations) of the 2nd Army Corps in early 1916 and was promoted to chef de bataillon in October.

In November 1917, Huntziger assumed command of a battalion of the 6th Colonial Infantry Regiment [fr] in the Troyon sector. He was subsequently assigned to the staff of the Allied Army of the Orient, under General Adolphe Guillaumat and based in Salonika, in January 1918. General Guillaumat selected Huntziger as head of the 3rd Bureau, where he was tasked with planning raids along the Macedonian front and the Battle of Skra-di-Legen in May. Huntziger developed the plan that underpinned the successful Vardar offensive in September, which led to an armistice with Bulgaria, and became a protégé of General Louis Franchet d'Espèrey, who had replaced Guillaumat in June.

== Interwar period ==
General d'Espèrey promoted Huntziger to lieutenant colonel in December and, by the end of 1918, he was Deputy Chief of the General Staff of the Allied armies in Constantinople (2nd and 3rd bureaus). Having established himself as a specialist in the Balkans, he was sent on missions to southern Russia and Romania in 1919. Huntziger returned to France in January 1920 and assumed the position of deputy chief of staff to Minister of War André Lefèvre. In January 1921, he enrolled at the Centre for Advanced Military Studies [fr] and became head of the 1st Bureau (organisation) of the Directorate of Colonial Troops in September, being conferred the rank of colonel in 1922.

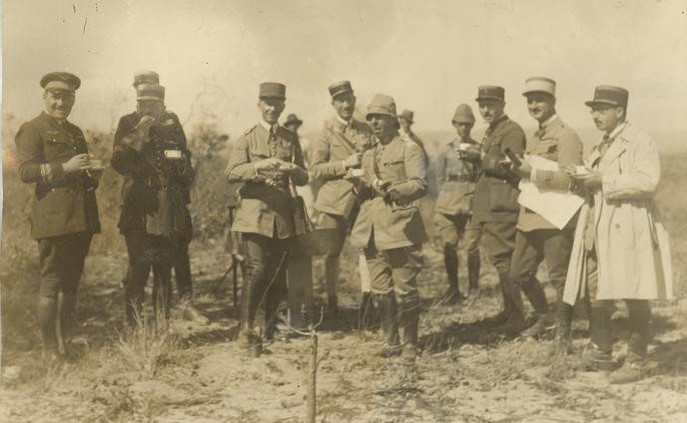
Brazilian military exercises with French instructors in Belo Horizonte, 1931. Huntziger is fourth from the left.

Between 1924 and 1928, Huntziger commanded the French occupation corps [fr] in the French concession in Tianjin. He returned to France in early 1928 and assumed the position of chief of staff of the General Inspectorate of Colonial Troops in February. Huntziger was promoted to the rank of brigadier general in December, making him the youngest general in the French Army at 48.

Huntziger was assigned to command the French military mission to Brazil between 1930 and 1934, during which time he was promoted to major general. In April 1934, he assumed the position of commander-in-chief of the French forces in the Levant. Huntziger was subsequently selected to assist the negotiations pertaining to the 1936 Franco-Lebanese and Franco-Syrian treaties. According to historian Pierre Rocolle, he skillfully reconciled divergent interests, particularly ethnic tensions, and demonstrated a "masterful command of diplomatic protocol". Returning to France in 1938, Huntziger was promoted to général d'armée in April and became a member of the Conseil supérieur de la guerre in May.

Having initially established useful contacts in attendance at Mustafa Kemal Atatürk's funeral, Huntziger was selected to lead the Franco-Turkish rapprochement. In July 1939, he was entrusted with leading the military mission to negotiate the Tripartite Treaty of Ankara [de] and presented its findings to Prime Minister Édouard Daladier in Paris and the British government in London. Huntziger had been proposed as the new High Commissioner of the Levant but this was opposed by General Maurice Gamelin who wanted to reserve him for an important command in France. He was replaced in the Levant in August by General Maxime Weygand who headed the broader Eastern Mediterranean Theatre of Operations and finalised the treaty with the Turks.

== Battle of France ==
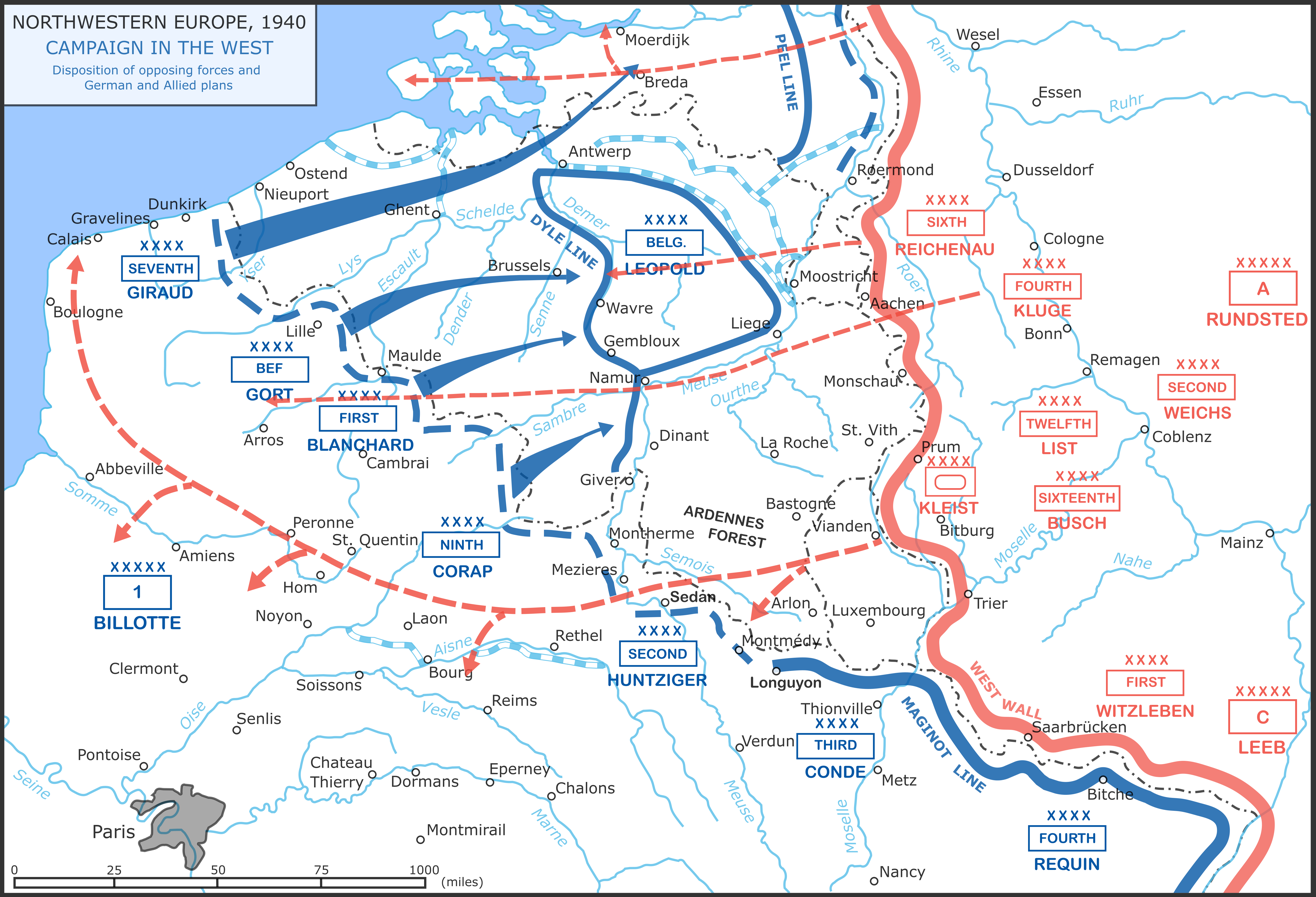
Positions and plans of the Allied and German armies on the eve of battle, May 1940

Huntziger received command of the Second Army, composed of seven divisions, that was to maintain defensive positions along the Meuse. He was at that point the youngest général d'armée and Gamelin reportedly considered him his most qualified successor as commander-in-chief if he were removed.

Huntziger's section of the front ran from where the Meuse entered France just north of Sedan to where the Maginot Line ended at Longuyon and included the 75 km (47 mi) of the French Ardennes. On his left was the Ninth Army under General André Corap and on his right the Third Army under General Charles-Marie Condé. Huntziger established a modest command post in the village of Senuc on 2 September 1939.

=== Preparations ===
Though Huntziger benefited from 20 km (12 mi) of strong fortifications on his right flank, other parts of his section of the front were only lightly fortified. During the Phoney War, Huntziger directed his men to spend most of their time building fortifications and increased the density of blockhouses in the sector. He poured more concrete in the Fortified Sector of Montmédy than the Sedan sector and this meant that his troops had little time to train. Due to the nature of the terrain, Huntziger considered Sedan to be the least vulnerable sector of his line and his main worry was that the Germans might attack further to the south-east, near Mouzon, with the view of assaulting the Maginot Line from the rear. To counter this, he placed his strongest units on his right flank while the Sedan sector on his left flank was covered by the 55th Infantry Division, one of his two weaker and poorly resourced Series B divisions. In contrast to Corap who complained to Gamelin on several occasions about the inadequacies of his troops and their insufficient number, Huntziger was more complacent.

To compensate for the almost complete lack of anti-aircraft defences against low-flying aircraft, Huntziger positioned machine guns in circular trenches. He frequently visited his units, paying close attention to troops' food, clothing, and hygiene and drafted a manual incorporating lessons from the German invasion of Poland. Requests for additional fortifications had to pass through Huntziger, who typically took several weeks to respond. In March 1940, local troops took the initiative in constructing anti-tank obstacles on the outskirts of Sedan on the two roads that led from the Ardennes; an order arrived from Huntziger on 3 May to demolish them. Speaking at Pétain's trial in 1945, Huntziger's chief of staff Henri Lacaille responded that the fortifications, albeit well-intentioned, obstructed an offensive mission of the Second Army. (Note: Streicher doesn't explicitly clarify what this "offensive mission" was that Lacaille referred to. As part of one of the first phases of the Dyle plan, Huntziger and Corap were required to send cavalry reconnaissance groups deep into the Belgian Ardennes. These groups encountered resistance and were pushed back, crossing the Meuse back to the French lines on 12 May.)

Huntziger organised a press office that published a bimonthly bulletin aimed at preparing officers for the coming battle, assigning prominent Maurrassian Henri Massis to head it. Elitist in his tastes, Huntziger entrusted Xavier de Courville [fr] with setting up a theatre troupe and orchestra, which employed pianist Alfred Cortot, as an alternative to the usual army theatre. This led to some ridicule in the French press, with General Victor Bourret (in command of the Fifth Army in Bas-Rhin) later remarking that Huntziger appeared "more concerned with theatrical performances than with work".

In March 1940 a parliamentary delegation visited Huntziger's section of the front, following which its rapporteur, Pierre Taittinger, sent an alarmist report to Daladier and Gamelin pointing out "grave insufficiencies" at Sedan and describing it as a "particularly weak point" in the French defences. In his report, Taittinger was sceptical of the effectiveness of the Meuse as a natural barrier. In his reply on 8 April, Huntziger criticised civilian involvement in military affairs and responded that he had reported the lack of anti-aircraft defences to command on several occasions and lacked the means by which to improve it. In conclusion, he stated: "I believe that no urgent measures are necessary to reinforce the Sedan front". On the evening of 9 May, amid indications of a German offensive, Huntziger attended the army theatre in Vouziers.

=== German offensive ===
On 10 May, Huntziger decided at the last minute to call up the 71st Infantry Division, his other Series B division that was held in reserve, to reinforce the front at Sedan. A delay in transferring command meant that the division only arrived on 12 May, during the German attack across the Meuse. Its units thereafter became entangled with those of the 55th Infantry Division, causing significant confusion that was further aggravated by changes in fire plans and the French communication system. On 13 May, Huntziger sent an urgent telegram to the Grand Quartier Général (GQG), following which the order was given and maintained to commit the 3rd Armoured Division held in reserve in spite of Huntziger's telegram later that day downplaying the urgency of the situation. Huntziger subsequently directed General Jean Adolphe Louis Robert Flavigny to disperse his tanks into smaller pockets along the 12 km (7.5 mi) front, in contradiction to French doctrine. Together with the poor combat readiness of the division and further delays, this meant that the opportunity to mount an effective counterattack and contain the German breach was lost.

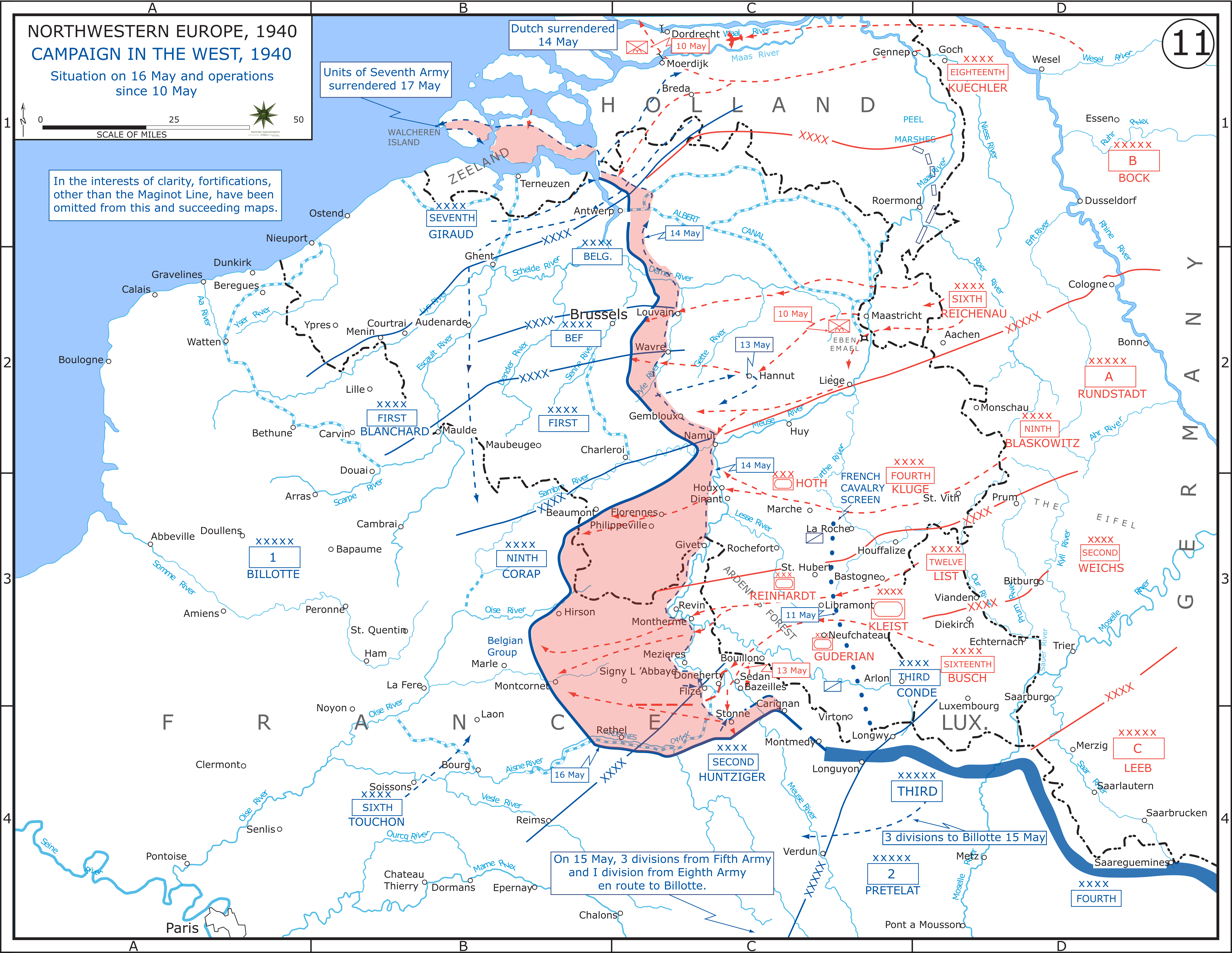
Front line situation between 14 – 16 May. See Huntziger's Second Army, centre bottom.

On 14 May Huntziger telephoned General Alphonse Joseph Georges (commander-in-chief of the Northeastern Front) to ask whether he should withdraw to cover Paris or the Maginot Line. Georges responded indirectly that Huntziger should do the best possible and maintain contact with Corap's Ninth Army. Huntziger subsequently opted to cover the Maginot Line, leaving the way clear for the Panzer divisions to advance all the way to the English Channel. The second line around Stonne held firm, though this battle had become irrelevant as the Germans pushed northwest into France.

As early as 15 May, Georges proposed that Huntziger be dismissed and Corap swapped with General Henri Giraud in command of the Seventh Army; Gamelin refused but agreed to swap Corap. This allowed Corap to be scapegoated by Prime Minister Paul Reynaud. On 18 May, Huntziger distributed a pamphlet among his troops, written by Massis, that was intended to restore the confidence of soldiers disoriented by the new German tactics that involved dive-bombing, massive tank attacks, and paratrooper incursions. After forwarding it to Reynaud's office, the pamphlet was widely distributed to the French press and radio, making Huntziger a popular figure overnight. With a reorganisation on 3 June, Weygand, having replaced Gamelin as commander-in-chief, entrusted Huntziger with command of the new Fourth Army Group that included the Second Army and which held a front that spanned from the Aisne to the northwestern end of the Maginot Line.

==== Meeting with de Gaulle ====
As early as 27 May, Huntziger is said to have believed that fighting on was pointless and that a negotiated armistice was the best possible outcome. Having met with Weygand on 8 June and found him to be defeatist, General Charles de Gaulle insisted to Reynaud that he be replaced with Huntziger, remarking: "Although he doesn't have everything going for him, he is capable, in my opinion, of rising to the level of a global strategy". This was supported by Hélène de Portes, Reynaud's mistress, who was close to Huntziger. De Gaulle subsequently met with Huntziger at Arcis-sur-Aube on 11 June and asked him whether he would be willing to replace Weygand and continue the war by moving to Africa. According to de Gaulle, Huntziger consented, but this account is disputed by Weygand, Marcel Peyrouton, Massis, and Huntziger's personal notes. Huntziger's personal notes indicate that he responded cautiously, with him writing: "I said that we must continue to the limit of our forces, but that limit could be reached very quickly."

=== Armistice negotiations ===
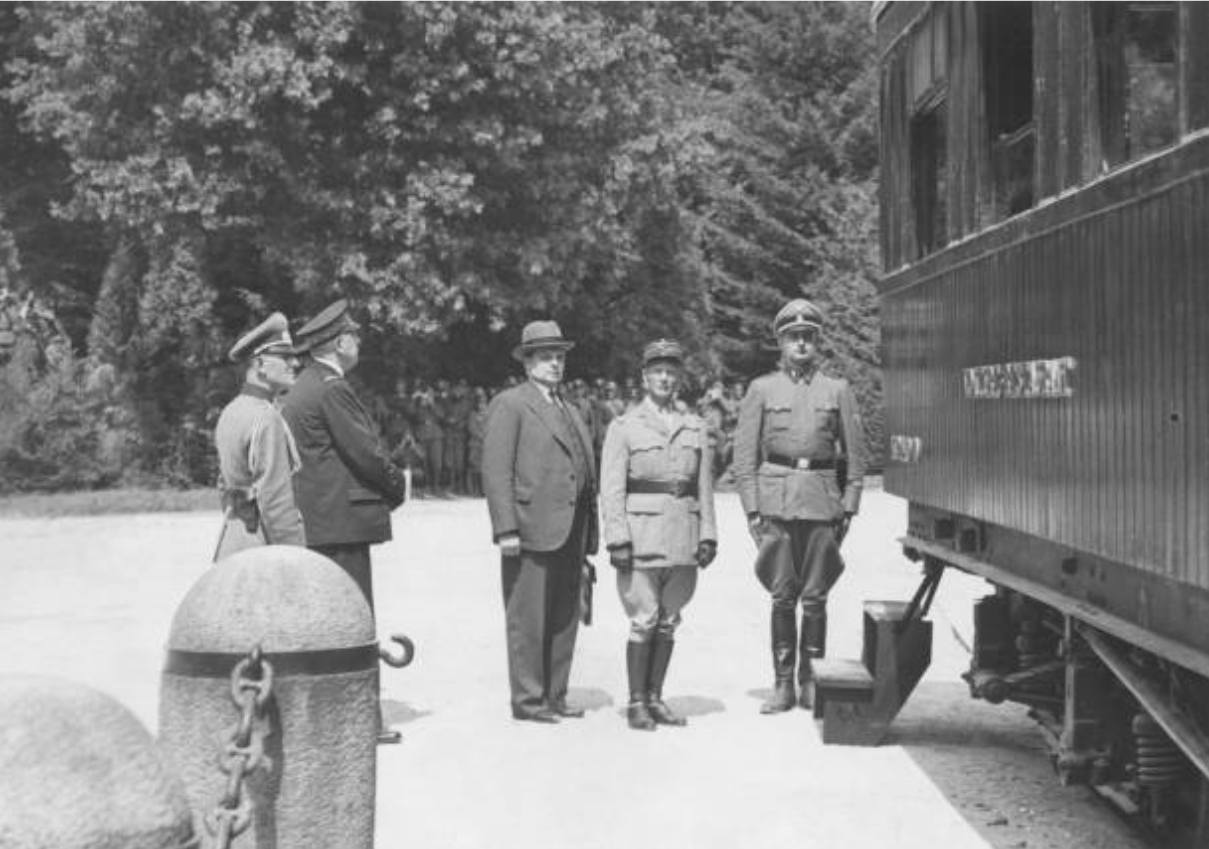
French delegation outside the Compiègne Wagon. Huntziger is second from the right

At a meeting of French military and political leaders of Marshal Philippe Pétain's government in Bordeaux on 19 June, Huntziger was selected to head the French delegation that would review and potentially sign the armistice. Arriving that afternoon, Huntziger received instructions to break off negotiations immediately if the Germans demanded the total or partial surrender of the fleet, the total occupation of Metropolitan France, or the occupation of any part of the colonial empire. On 20 June, the delegation travelled to Amboise from where they were escorted to Paris and subsequently on 21 June to Rethondes, in the Forest of Compiègne. Huntziger and the French delegation boarded the Compiègne Wagon where they were handed a copy of the armistice conditions by Adolf Hitler, in the presence of his entourage, (Note: This included Reichsmarschall Hermann Goerring, Grand Admiral Erich Raeder, Generalfeldmarschall Walther von Brauchitsch, Joachim von Ribbentrop, and Rudolf Hess.) who subsequently left the process in the hands of Generalfeldmarschall Wilhelm Keitel.

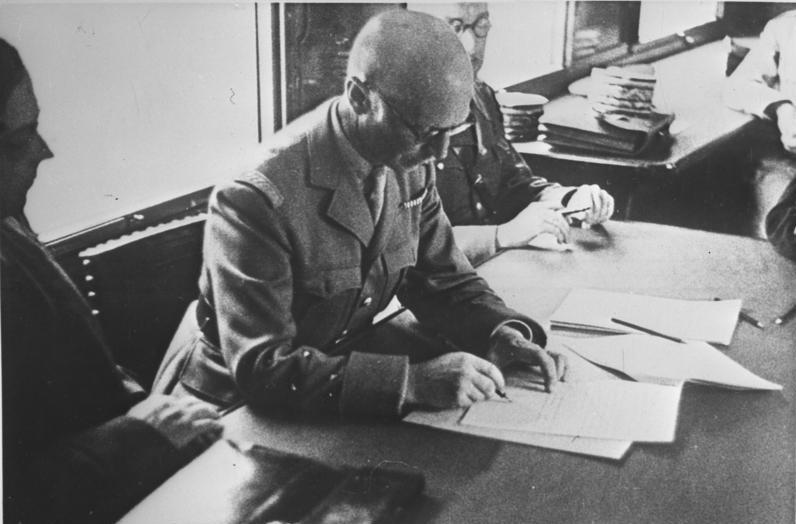
Huntziger signing the armistice on behalf of France

Keitel informed the French delegation that the text could not be changed but that they could request clarifications. Since they required the approval of their government, the delegation was allowed use of a tent to telephone Bordeaux, under surveillance and by open channels. Huntziger then spent two hours reading the translated armistice conditions to Weygand and presented Keitel with the French objections the following morning—especially concerning the condition that the armistice would only be valid once another had been concluded with Italy. Though he initially described the armistice to Weygand as "hard but not dishonouring", he called the proposed occupation zone "an abominable humiliation" and made clear that if the Italian demands were similarly harsh then France would continue the war from its African territories. At 6:40 p.m. on 22 June, Huntziger received the order to sign the armistice which he did at 6:50 p.m., prior to the deadline given of 7:30 p.m. Following the signing, Keitel dismissed all other participants such that the two were left alone in the carriage, whereby he expressed respect and understanding for Huntziger's position. According to Keitel's account, Huntziger apologised if he had lost his temper during the negotiations but conveyed his great offense at the condition for an Italian armistice given that France had not been defeated by the Italian army.

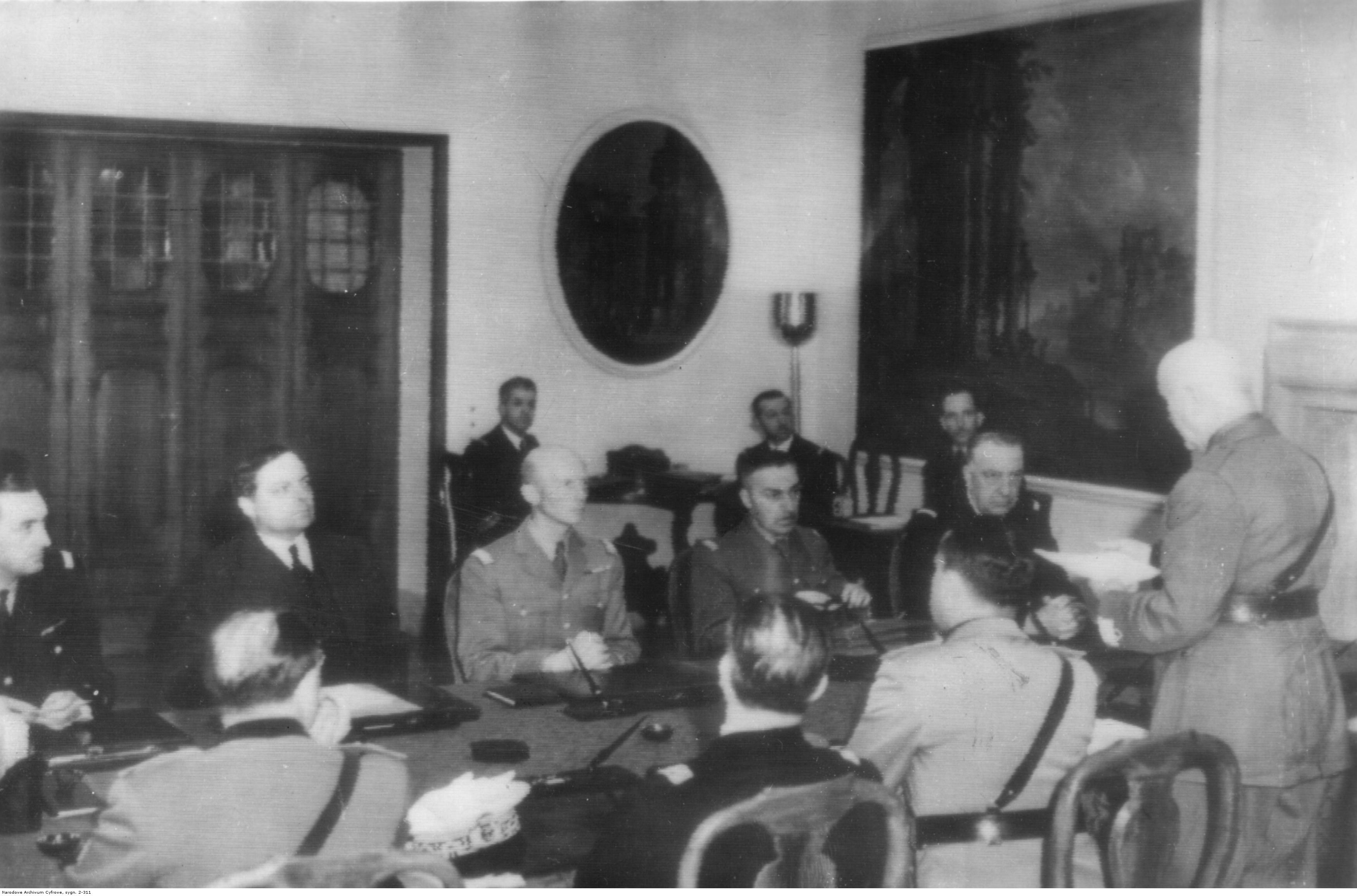
The French and Italian delegations in Rome. Huntziger is middle row, third from the left.

Given that it was in their interest to sign an armistice with Italy as soon as possible, the French delegation took a Luftwaffe plane from Le Bourget Airport to Rome on 23 June. Negotiations with the Italian side, led by Marshal Pietro Badoglio, began on 24 June, with the Italians taking into account almost all French requests. Since any delay would allow Germany the opportunity to expand their occupation zone, Huntziger and Léon Noël convinced Weygand to forgo receiving a physical copy of the text and it was again dictated by telephone. Huntziger and Noël also insisted on receiving powers of attorney to expedite the process, with Weygand giving the order to sign at 7:10 p.m. which was done five minutes later.

=== Postwar analysis ===
Julian Jackson asserts the view that it is pointless to seek out individual culprits for the French defeat, pointing to how "almost the entire French High Command had been caught unawares by the new kind of warfare". Jackson describes the decision to select Corap as the principal scapegoat as "an entirely arbitrary choice", noting that Huntziger's Second Army had performed no better and pointing to his complacency and failure to make effective use of the 3rd Armoured Division for a powerful counterattack. According to Jackson, the only reason Huntziger survived and Corap did not was because Corap had fewer protectors in high places.

Huntziger's biographer Jean-Claude Streicher asserts that the 3rd Armoured Division couldn't have been used any other way, having pointed to widespread deficiencies in the French armoured divisions. According to Streicher, Huntziger was selected to head the armistice delegation because he was of an appropriate rank and was available by telephone. Beyond Huntziger's "network of allies", Claude Quétel considers it likely that Reynaud protected him since he was one of Gamelin's potential successors. Quétel asserts the view that Pétain, Weygand, and their surrounding ministers, industrialists, senior civil servants betrayed France's interests to seize power and establish their new order.

Annie Lacroix-Riz claims that Huntziger was part of a seditious conspiracy and was to open the way for the German advance, describing him as a "Synarcho–Cagoulard". This is disputed by Streicher who dismisses it as a fallaciously supported Communist narrative, though he says that Huntziger certainly had Action Française sympathies. Streicher notes that Huntziger may have been associated with La Cagoule on account of his acquaintance with Colonel Georges Groussard.

== Vichy government ==
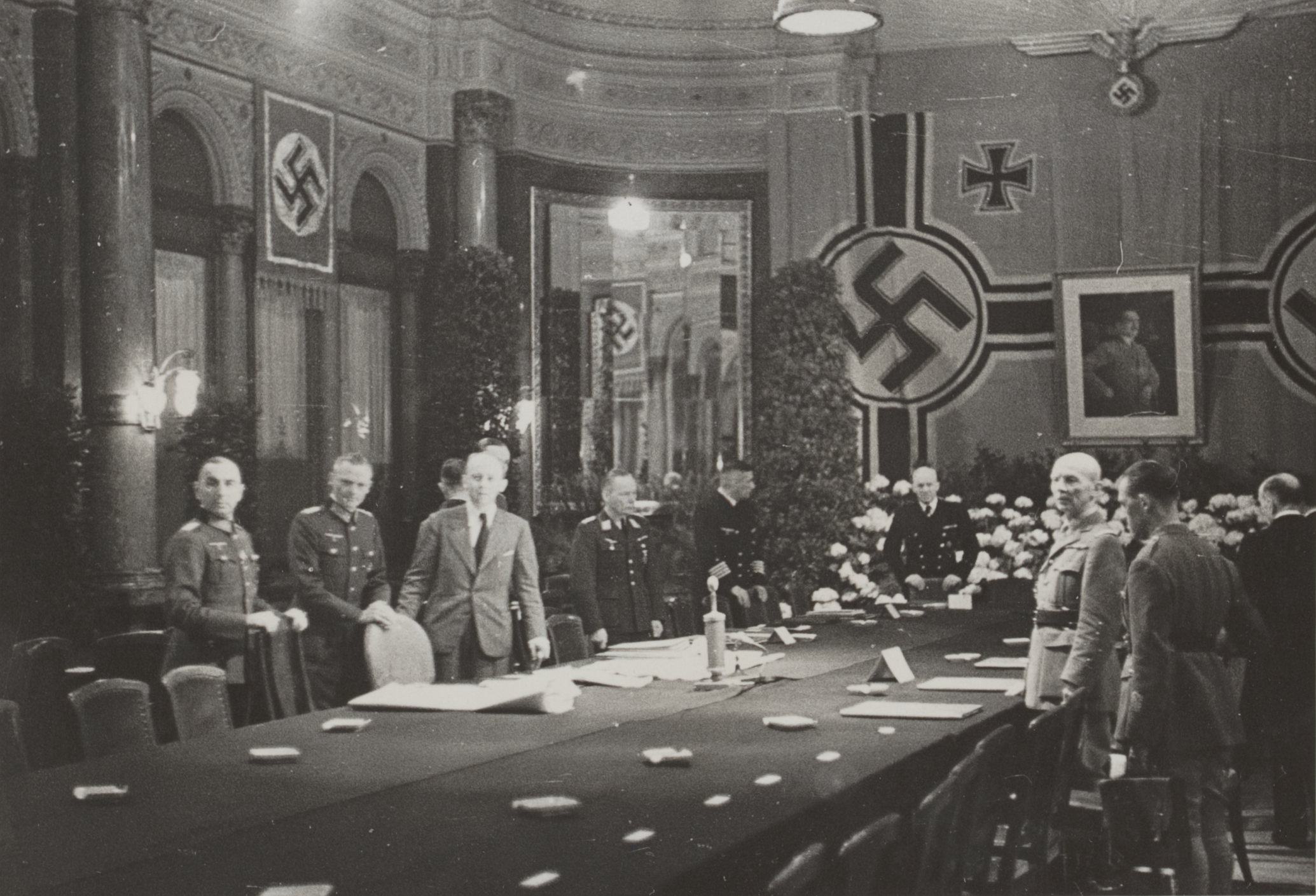
Huntziger (third from the right) at the Armistice Commission in Wiesbaden

Upon his return from Rome, Huntziger was entrusted with leading the French delegation to the German Armistice Commission in Wiesbaden. Huntziger remained in this role between 26 June and 13 September 1940, liaising between Vichy and Wiesbaden. Hitler described him as "one of the wiliest and cleverest of French representatives". In the aftermath of the attack on Mers-el-Kébir, Huntziger proposed on 7 July that the relationship between France and Germany extend beyond the Armistice Commission. He was able to secure the return of the Gendarmerie to the occupied zone in July but was unsuccessful in securing the freedom of French soldiers still holding out along the Maginot Line in late June and in reducing the exorbitant occupation costs that the Germans demanded in August. Huntziger also protested the progressive de facto annexation of Alsace–Lorraine.

=== Minister of War ===
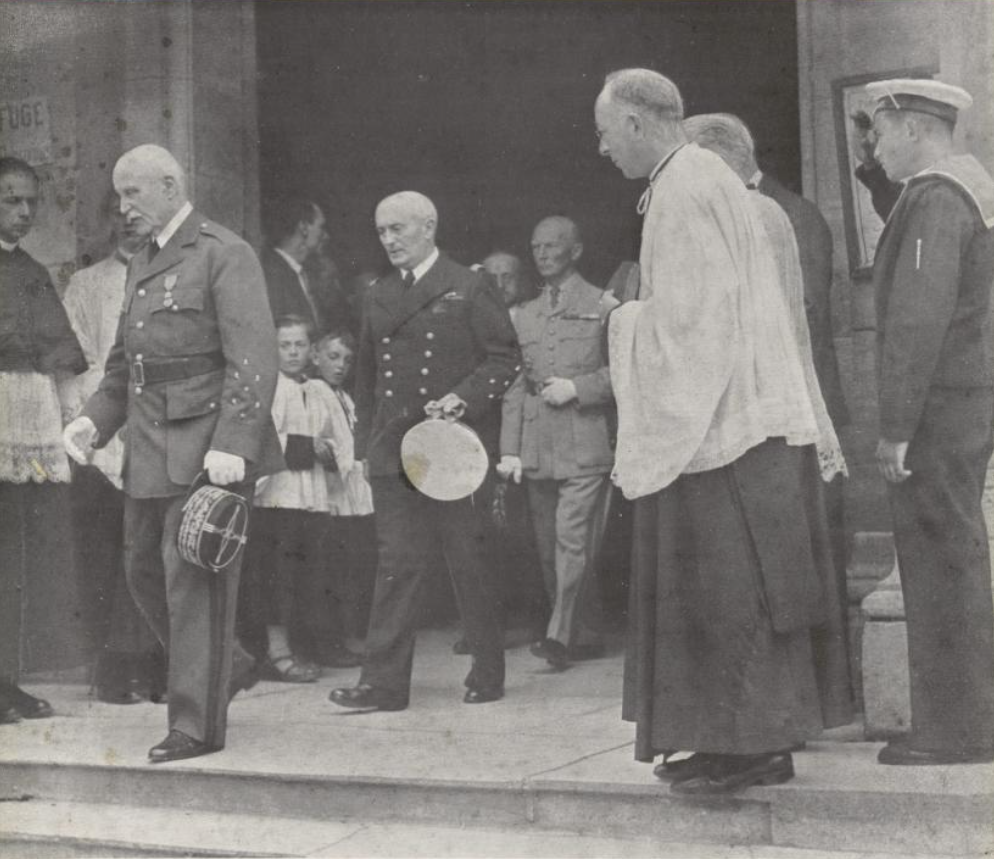
Pétain, Darlan, and Huntziger leaving a memorial service at the Church of Saint-Louis in Vichy on the first anniversary of Mers-el-Kébir

With the growing strategic importance of Vichy-controlled Africa, Pétain decided to reshuffle his government and appoint Weygand Delegate-General in French Africa. With the other likely candidates for Minister of War either killed or in prison, (Note: Robert Paxton refers to generals Gaston Billotte and Henri Giraud.) Huntziger assumed the position on 6 September almost by default. Huntziger was also appointed commander-in-chief of the Armistice Army, which he set about organising and which was originally limited to 100,000 men recruited from the zone libre.

Huntziger sympathised with Pétain's views and was similarly preoccupied with questions of morale and education, leading the two to develop warm relations. He displayed a more cautious attitude towards the Germans and opposed Weygand's idea for the establishment of a counterespionage service under the guise of fighting Communism. Huntziger shared Weygand's revanchist vision for the army and oversaw efforts led by René Carmille to plan for a rapid remobilisation in the event of a resumption of hostilities. He also introduced sport and vocational training into the army but this was largely pared back by Admiral François Darlan who was his successor and main rival in government. (Note: Darlan famously described Huntziger as having "une cervelle de noisette", or "a brain of a hazelnut".) There was a rumour at the time that Huntziger had used his position to suppress a commissioned report on the responsibility for the French defeat that, in its conclusions, had exonerated Corap and called into question his command of the Second Army.

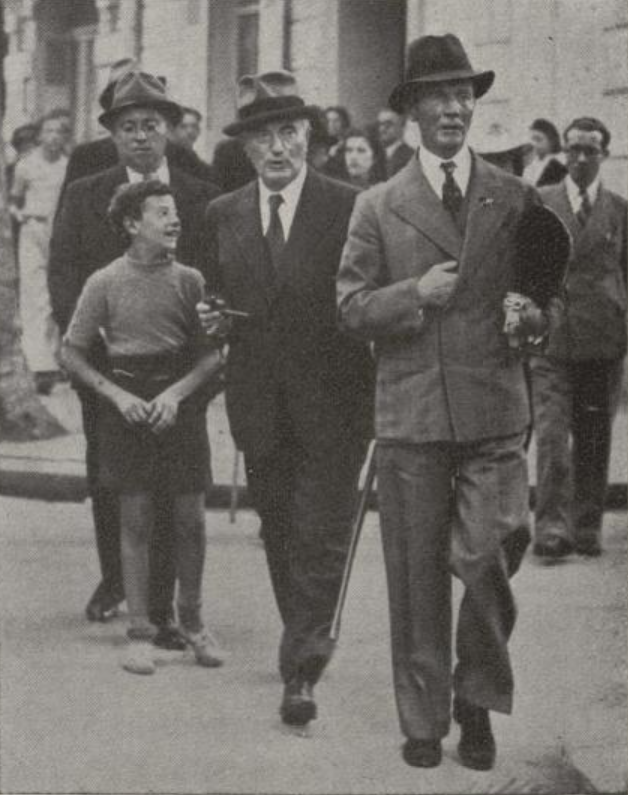
Darlan and Huntziger after a meeting of the Council of Ministers in Vichy

Huntziger was among the signatories of the First Statute on the Status of Jews on 3 October, though he had Pétain sign a decree on 13 December exempting Lieutenant General Darius Paul Dassault. On 31 October, Huntziger requested at Wiesbaden that Vichy France be granted a bigger and more independent armed forces that would work in "military collaboration" with Germany to keep or extend Vichy's control over French Africa. He announced a new combat training program on 25 November that was to teach soldiers to be more adaptive, rather than relying on preconceived theories as before. According to Colonel Groussard, Huntziger clandestinely collaborated with him to set up an anti-German intelligence network within Vichy France and met with him to prepare for his trip to London. Following the dismissal of Pierre Laval, Huntziger formed a governing triumvirate with Pierre-Étienne Flandin and Darlan between 13 December and 9 February 1941.

In a 28 February letter to Weygand, Huntziger stated that "the defeat [of May–June 1940] is the fault of the Jewish soldiers" and claimed that "reports on the morale of the troops in North Africa show that the Jews who remained in the units have a harmful influence and that, through their lack of national identity, they undermine the morale of the units". Huntziger asked Weygand to have all Jewish soldiers removed from the North African units. This commenced in March with Jewish soldiers subsequently interned at Bedeau camp, south of Oran.

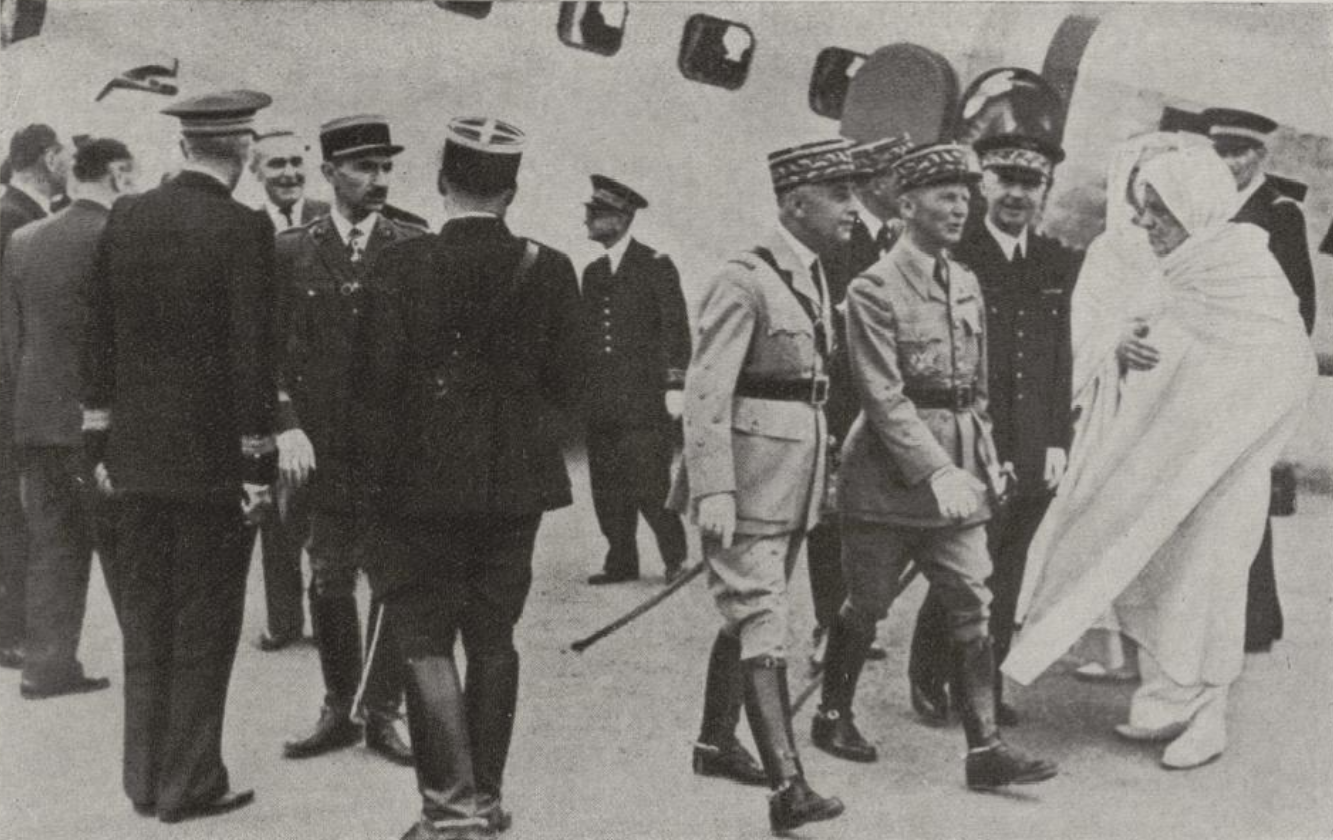
Huntziger (right, centre) being received in Rabat by General Charles Noguès and Grand Vizier Muhammad al-Muqri

Though he wasn't involved in the negotiations, Huntziger met with General Walter Warlimont to finalise the Paris Protocols and signed the three military protocols on 28 May. Huntziger also handled the repatriation of POWs in German captivity and welcomed Vichy soldiers returning from the Syria–Lebanon campaign. In June 1941, he secured the release of General Alphonse Juin. Huntziger was superseded by Darlan on 12 August whereby the position of Minister of War was subordinated to the re-established Minister of National Defence. To prevent them from escaping with the help of the British or the French Resistance, Huntziger proposed that Léon Blum, Édouard Daladier, Paul Reynaud, Georges Mandel, and Maurice Gamelin be interned at Fort du Portalet in the lead up to the Riom Trial. They were transferred there from Château de Bourassol on the day of his death.

On 22 October, Huntziger embarked on an inspection tour of Vichy forces in Africa to coincide with the centenary of the first Algerian riflemen regiments and spahis and the anniversary of the 1918 armistice. He departed Algiers on 12 November, intending to take his ministerial aircraft back to Vichy. There was a rumour at the time that he had cut his trip short upon learning that Darlan wanted to remove him. According to Huntziger's biographer, this rumour "does not hold water" with it being Weygand whose position was under threat at the time.

== Death ==
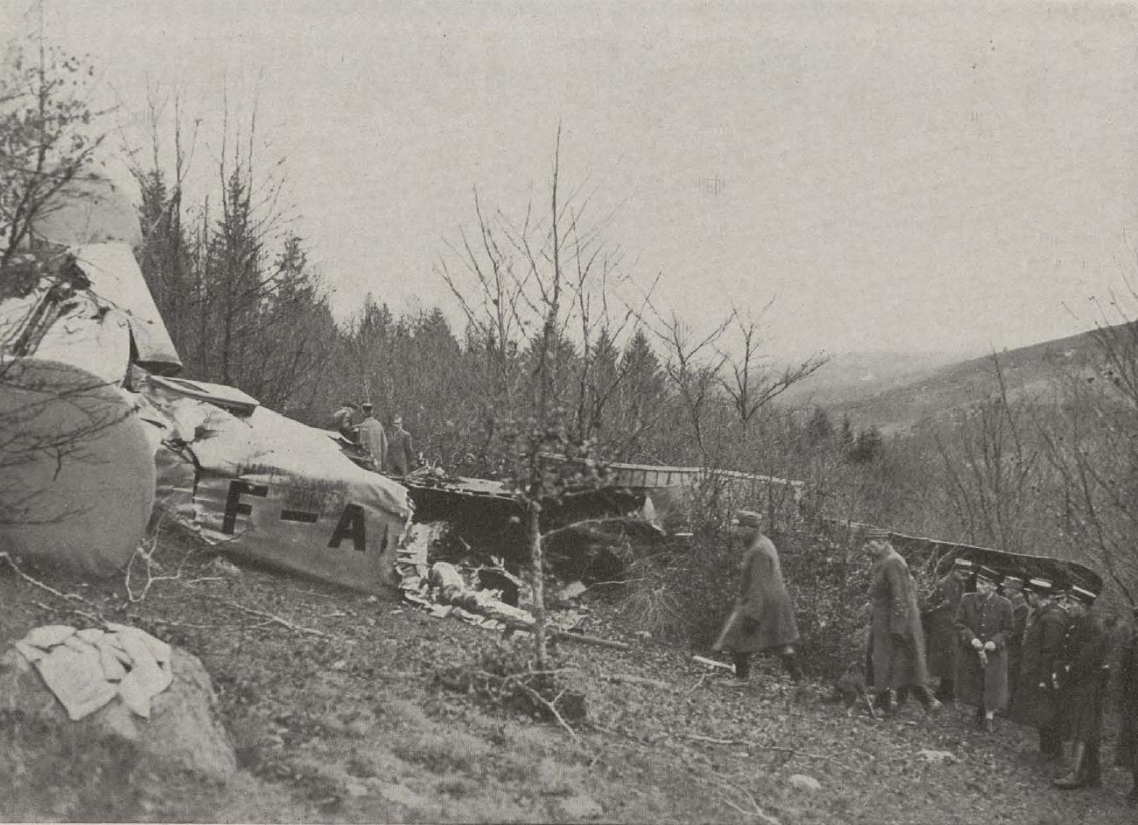
The site of the crash

Huntziger was killed on 12 November 1941 when his Potez 662 ministerial aircraft [fr] crashed into the Cévennes, near Bréau, having fallen victim to icing upon encountering a cold front. All six passengers and the pilot were killed. Upon receiving the news, Pétain reportedly locked himself in his room. High ranking Nazis, including Hitler, and Benito Mussolini sent Pétain and their French counterparts their condolences.

=== Commemoration ===
A state funeral (obsèques nationales) for the victims of the plane crash was held on 15 November at the Church of Saint Louis in Vichy. It was attended by German and Italian delegations on account of Huntziger signing the June 1940 armistices. Their remains were subsequently interred in a cemetery, north of Vichy. The funeral was German ambassador Otto Abetz's second, final, and only friendly visit to Vichy and gave the Germans the opportunity to obtain Weygand's dismissal from Pétain. Charles Maurras contributed a front-page editorial to L'Action française on 18 November in memory of Huntziger.

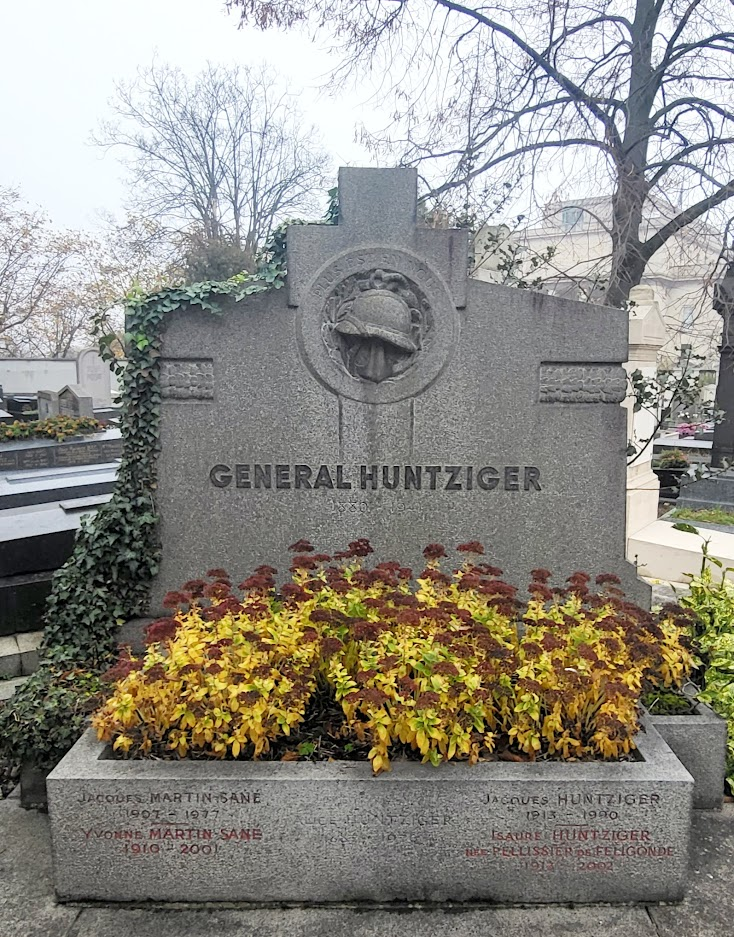
Huntziger's grave in Passy Cemetery, Paris

Members of the 18th Chantier de la jeunesse who found the wreckage used the money they were awarded to erect a granite stele near the crash site and on the Col du Minier pass. It was inaugurated on 10 June 1942.

On 19 September 1942, the Armistice Army erected a second granite stele at the site of the accident though it was never signposted and remains difficult to find without a guide. The stele has since been allowed to fall into disrepair, owing to Huntziger's signing of the armistices and his participation in the Vichy regime.

Though the date is unknown, Huntziger's family later transferred his remains from Vichy to Passy Cemetery in Paris. According to historian Jean-Noël Grandhomme, Huntziger has largely been forgotten in contemporary France.

== Decorations ==
France

- Grand Officer of the Legion of Honour – 30 June 1937
  - Commander – 23 December 1927
  - Officer – 16 June 1920
  - Knight – 25 October 1915
- Croix de guerre 1914–1918 (one palm)
- Colonial Medal (AOF and MADAGASCAR clasps)
- 1914–1918 Inter-Allied Victory medal
- 1914–1918 Commemorative War Medal
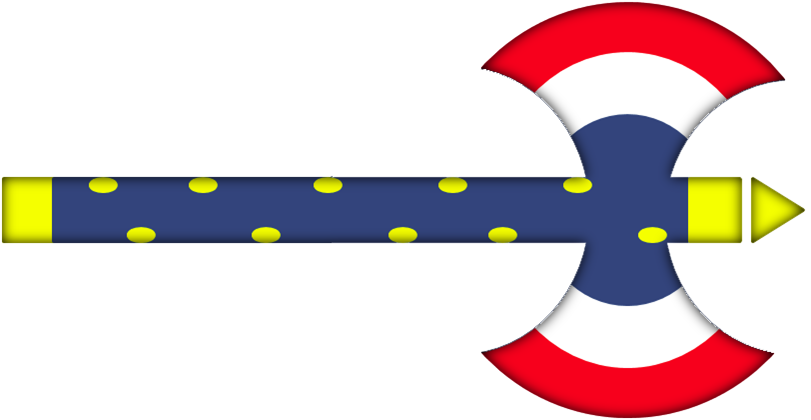
- Order of the Francisque – November 1940

United Kingdom

- Distinguished Service Order

== See also ==
- Jacques Gabriel Huntzinger (great-nephew)
- France during World War II
- French West Africa in World War II
- North African Campaign
- Vichy France
- Historiography of Vichy France
- Vichy Syndrome

== Bibliography ==
- Fonvieille-Alquier, François (1973). The French and the Phoney War, 1939–40. Translated by Ashcroft, Edward. London: T. Stacey. ISBN 978-085-468-442-7.
- Grandhomme, Jean-Noël (2015). "STREICHER (Jean-Claude), Le général Huntziger. L' « Alsacien » du maréchal Pétain. Jérôme Do Bentzinger, 2015, 241 p." Revue d'Alsace (in French) (141): 515–516. doi:10.4000/alsace.2284.
- Guiffan, Jean; Barreau, Joël; Liters, Jean-Louis (2008). Le lycée clemenceau, nantes : 200 ans d'histoire [Clemenceau High School, Nantes: 200 years of history] (in French). Nantes: Coiffard. ISBN 978-291-036-685-8.
- Jackson, Julian (2004). The Fall of France: The Nazi Invasion of 1940. Oxford University Press. ISBN 978-019-280-550-8.
- Jackson, Robert (1975). The Fall of France: May–June 1940. London: Barker. ISBN 978-021-316-557-4.
- Lormier, Dominique (2005). Comme des lions: Mai–juin 1940, le sacrifice héroïque de l'armée française [Like Lions: May–June 1940, The Heroic Sacrifice of the French Army] (in French). Paris: Calmann-Lévy. ISBN 2-7021-3445-9.
- Paxton, Robert O. (1966). Parade and Politics at Vichy: The French Officer Corps Under Marshal Pétain. Princeton, NJ: Princeton University Press. ISBN 978-069-105-142-0.
- Paxton, Robert O. (2001). Vichy France: Old Guard and New Order 1940–1944. New York: Columbia University Press. ISBN 978-023-112-469-0.
- Quétel, Claude (2010). L'impardonnable défaite: 1918–1940 [The Unforgivable Defeat: 1918–1940] (in French). Paris: Perrin. ISBN 978-226-203-398-9.
- Rocolle, Pierre (1990). La Guerre de 1940: La Défaite, 10 mai – 25 juin [The War of 1940: The Defeat, 10 May – 25 June] (in French). Malakoff: Armand Colin. ISBN 978-220-037-202-6.
- Schiavon, Max (2019). "Charles Huntziger, depuis sa naissance jusqu'en 1938" [Charles Huntziger, From His Birth Until 1938]. In Schiavon, Max (ed.). Les Carnets secrets du général Huntziger (1938–1941) [The Secret Notebooks of General Huntziger (1938–1941)] (in French). Paris: Éditions Pierre de Taillac. pp. 11–37. ISBN 978-2-36-445142-1.
- Streicher, Jean-Claude (2014). Le général Huntziger: l'"Alsacien" du maréchal Pétain [General Huntziger: Marshal Pétain's "Alsatian"] (in French). Colmar: J. Do Bentzinger. ISBN 978-284-960-435-9.
