= Georges Groussard (French army officer) =

French army officer and resistance leader

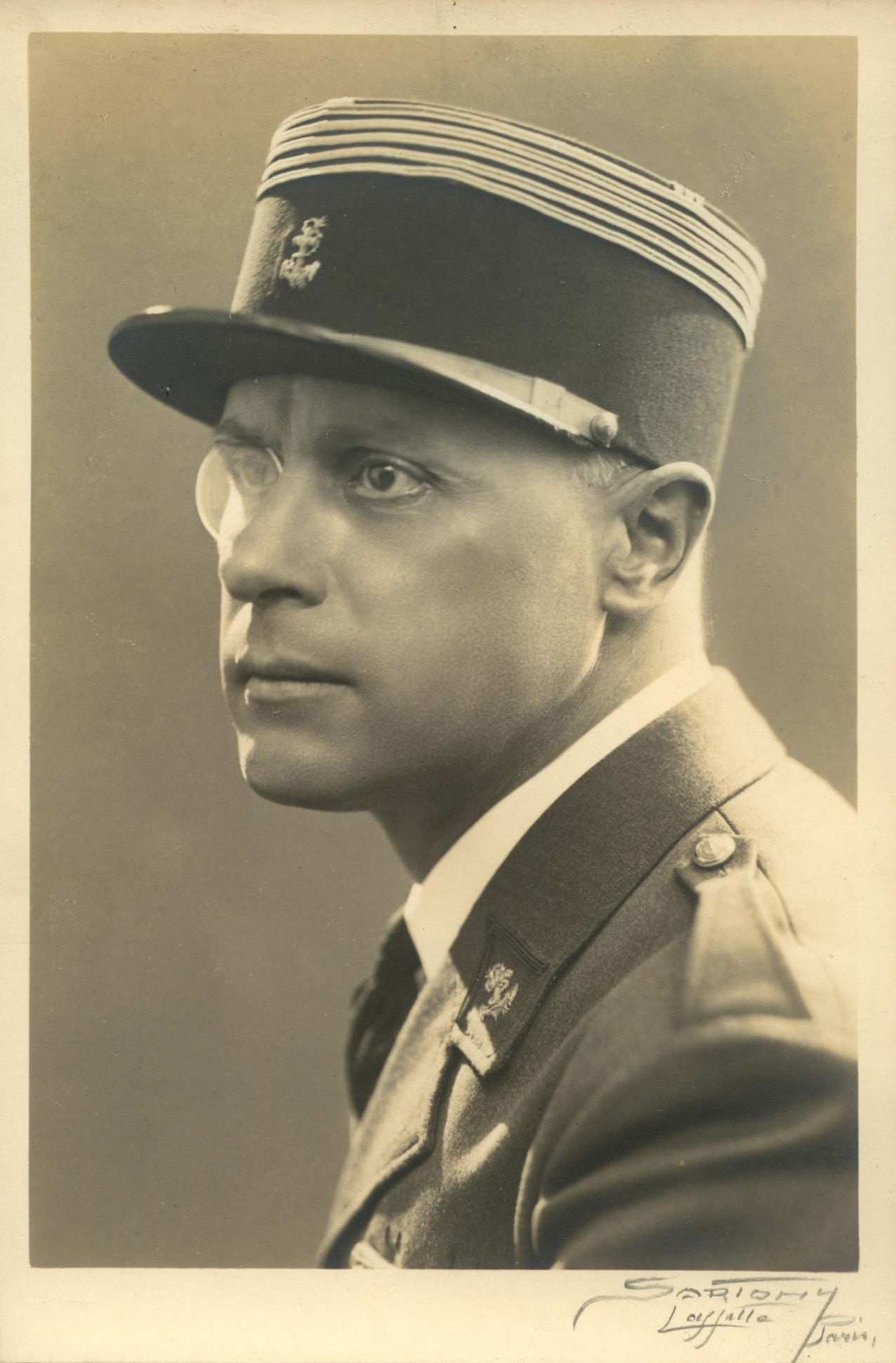
- Georges Groussard in the 1930s
- Born: November 21, 1891; Saint-Martin-lès-Melle, France
- Died: March 22, 1980 (aged 88)
- Spouse: Véra Bernstein (m. 1914; died 1971) Suzanne Kohn (m. 1971)
- Children: 5, including Serge
- Military career
- Allegiance: France
- Branch: French Army
- Rank: Colonel

Georges André Groussard (21 November 1891 – 22 March 1980), also known as Colonel Groussard, was a French army officer and Resistance leader. He fought in World War I and became an active anti-communist associated with the extreme-right-wing organisation La Cagoule. Resigned to the Vichy régime after the surrender of France in World War II, he ran separate organisations within it, was twice imprisoned and created the reseaux Gilbert [Gilbert resistance networks] with support from the UK and Switzerland.

== Early years and First World War ==
He was born in Saint-Martin-lès-Melle (Deux-Sèvres) to Magdeleine Églantine (née Chataigneau) and Jean Honoré Groussard, from a line of Huguenot families. He was a graduate of the Marie-Louise class (1911–1913) and Montmirail promotion, becoming an infantry officer of la Coloniale in WWI, distinguishing himself in the Champagne offensive.

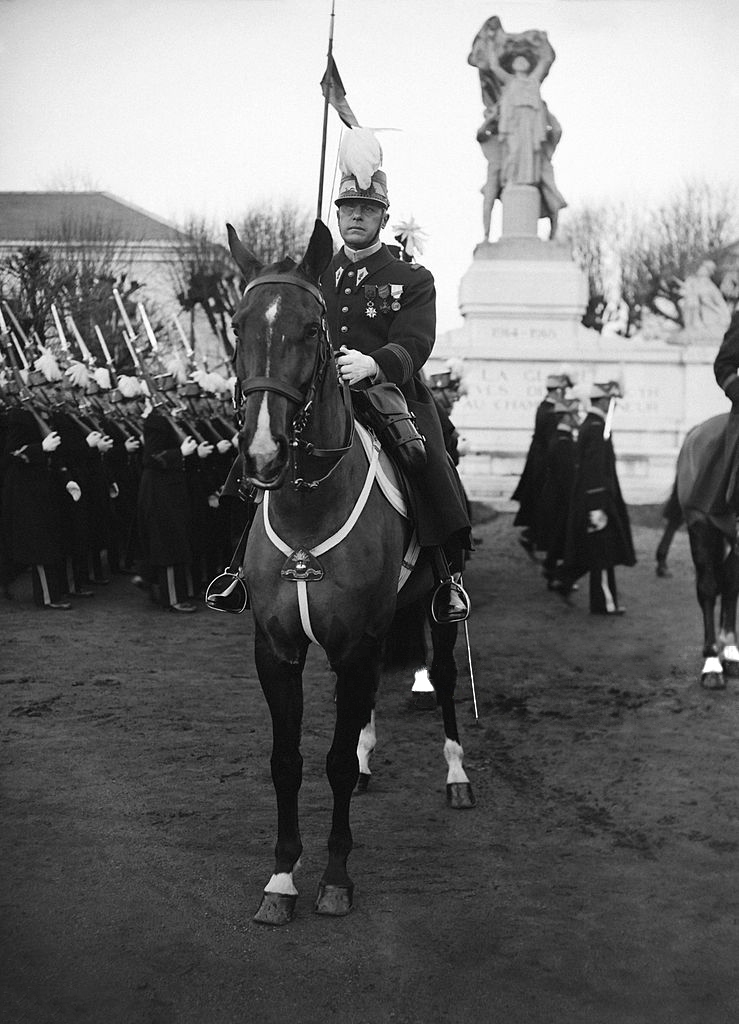
Second-in-command colonel Georges Groussard during a ceremony in the courtyard of the Saint-Cyr officer school, 31 March 1938.

== Interwar period ==
Between the World Wars, he continued an army career in charge of imports at the Secrétariat général de la Défense et de la Sécurité nationale during which time he learned of German stockpiling of resources, control of markets and deals concerning Fascist Italy and the Soviet Union. At the same time, he was active in the anti-communist networks of the Cagoule militaire. In the mid-1930s, he created - with captain Jean Chrétien - a clandestine army network to react to any communist coup attempt, which gained support from André Brouillard, head of the Deuxième Bureau (former secret service) in Paris. In August 1936, this network merged with the Corvignolles network of Georges Loustaunau-Lacau, initially led by the three men, then by Georges Loustaunau-Lacau alone after the transfer of Groussard and Chrétien. He was made a colonel and posted to Morocco that year. In 1939, he was made second-in-command of the Saint-Cyr military school - his alma mater - where he formed a Franco-British friendship promotion.

== Second World War and the Nazi occupation of Paris ==
Groussard was posted to Alsace at the commencement of the Battle of France. On 5 June 1940, he became chief-of-staff to general Pierre Héring, gouverneur militaire of Paris from 1939, a city from which most residents had fled. On 13 June, general Henri Dentz replaced Héring as gouverneur. Already angry at the collapsed government, Groussard berated Dentz for his perceived submission to the Nazis. They were summoned to the newly requisitioned Hôtel de Crillon by Nazi general Bogislav von Studnitz, who said Groussard should be shot for burning fuel depots after he complained about not being allowed to rejoin army comrades who'd moved south of Paris. They were placed under house arrest at the villa of the Aga Khan; he went on a short hunger strike to the alarm of his staff. After the Armistice of 22 June 1940 was signed, they were escorted to Vichy in the zone libre.

== Chief of the Centre d'informations et d'études ==
He joined the Armistice army hoping, like Loustaunau-Lacau, to build a clandestine army from the anti-Nazi Vichyssois. He began recruiting, including many who were former cagoulards (members of La Cagoule). One, Gabriel Jeantet, in charge of propaganda for Vichy, put him in contact with another, industrialist Paul Dungler, who created the 7e colonne network in Alsace which collected intelligence on the Nazis. Groussard created the Centre d'informations et d'études (CIE) - an intelligence service - coupled with an "action service" - the groupes de protection - officially an auxiliary police force but planned also as a cover to train thousands to supervise a liberation army; he did not regard it (nor was it generally regarded afterwards) as part of the Resistance. He took cagoulard François Métenier as his deputy and gained the sanction of Raphael Alibert, anglophile Vichy minister of justice (also a cagoulard), fellow coloniale general Charles Huntziger, minister of war and Marcel Peyrouton, minister of the interior; the latter provided funds and appointed Groussard inspecteur général des services de la sureté nationale as a suitable cover.

On 13 December 1940, Groussard gladly organised the arrest of deputy prime minister Pierre Laval at the suggestion of Peyrouton - Laval was disliked by Vichy prime minister marshal Philippe Pétain and regarded as being too pro-Nazi by others; he was soon released after Nazi ambassador Otto Abetz intervened. The groupes de protection were then officially dissolved. Groussard, nominally disavowed, resigned his position. Huntziger, however, asked him to continue to work against the Nazis as a "sniper"; he authorised Groussard's request to visit Free French leader Charles de Gaulle in London on a mission named Gilbert. The CIE was also officially dissolved on 20 December but continued to operate unofficially - and not clandestinely - under commander Robert Labat, a former frigate captain who was Groussard's assistant in the CIE, benefiting from special government funds. Labat ran it secretly from his home before it was recast with an avowable title as an 'anti-masonic intelligence service'; he sent information to Vichy with a broad scope, covering the activities of freemasons, gaullistes, Nazis and communists.

Groussard also acted in his Vichy roles in an 'official' manner: he refused a patriotic request from the Marseille-based and openly vichysto-résistant general Gabriel Cochet, instead giving local CIE director Joseph Darnand a search order regarding Cochet and trying to infiltrate his group(Cochet was interned by admiral François Darlan in June 1941); Méténier wrote to the Nazi leader in Paris, Helmut Knocken, to explain the CIE's shared goals in extending their operations into the zone occupée, specifically to root out communists in the Resistance; Antoine Marchi, former cagoulard and a member of a groupe de protection, was arrested on the instruction of police commissioner Charles Chenevier as he appeared to be behind of the assassination of Marx Dormoy, the former Front Populaire minister who had tried to suppress La Cagoule. The CIE was a prototype of other auxiliary police forces in Vichy France.

== The Gilbert mission to London ==
With the help of resister Pierre Fourcaud, Groussard reached London via Portugal in June 1941, but could not get to see de Gaulle. He met prime minister Winston Churchill and then foreign secretary Anthony Eden (with de Gaulle now in Cairo) explaining the limits of Pétain's role and the anti-Nazi will amongst Vichy staff - the meeting was unofficial because although Pétain was aware of it, admiral Darlan was kept in ignorance. Churchill respected Pétain but was scornful of the Vichy régime for not helping more and trying to play a balancing act between the Nazis and their former ally. Groussard, amazed at how well-informed the British were about France, promised to return with instructions. He saw former Saint-Cyr colleague and Free France intelligence leader André Dewavrin - better known by his codename colonel Passy - several times and made an agreement with him to provide information to Free France in London from the networks of the former groupes de protection and from Dungler's 7e colonne; the UK would subsidise groupes d'action in France for terrorist activities, which was of no direct interest to Dewavrin. On his return to France, Groussard was arrested on the instructions of general Darlan, joining former prime minister Paul Reynaud, his fellow politicians Georges Mandel and Jean-Louis Tixier-Vignancour and aircraft manufacturer Marcel Dassault as a detainee in Vals-les-Bains. He was released the following year, under house arrest in Cannes. He was arrested again, began another hunger strike and was interned in a lunatic asylum. After a final release, he returned to Cannes before evading another arrest attempt and escaping to Switzerland in November 1942 in a market gardener's cart during the invasion of the zone occupée by the Wehrmacht and Italian forces.

== The Reseaux Gilbert ==
He reactivated military intelligence networks while in Switzerland, which he made work for the intelligence services. From Switzerland, he directed the networks in France at the request of the UK, having given up on joining the Free France forces (following his trip to London) and fighting openly as he'd intended. Because he had been second-in-command at Saint-Cyr, all young active or reserve officers in France knew him. Many of these staffed the networks. He was known as Eric to these men because his appearance - shaven head and monocle - was like film-maker Eric von Stroheim. In Geneva, he met French lieutenant (and future general) André Devigny and British vice-consul Victor Farell, the latter promising financial support. With the help of Swiss intelligence officer captain Pierre Clément as their technical advisor, they quickly cast the net of the Gilbert networks, named after Groussard's abortive mission to London, across France, Germany and Italy. In one Geneva network, Groussard was introduced by Swiss intelligence agent Marcel Durupthy to Salesian priest Louis Favre who helped resisters cross the Swiss border and couriered mail on behalf of the Swiss intellingence services. Favre was arrested by the Gestapo, tortured and executed in Annecy.

== Liberation and post-war ==
After the liberation of France, Groussard turned down the offer of promotion to general by de Gaulle, eventually leaving the army.

In 1947, he was challenged on his role in the Vichy police by Maurice Garçon and Georges Chadirat, lawyers at the Paris court of appeal, who twice defended resister René Hardy, accused of complicity in the arrest and execution of leading resistance organiser Jean Moulin. Groussard sent two letters to the lawyers and challenged them to a duel.

During the developing crises of the Fourth Republic, he welcomed the return of de Gaulle from retirement, like most others on the right; during the Algiers putsch of 1961 and the 1962 Algerian independence referendum, he was angry with de Gaulle and supported general Raoul Salan, who then founded the extreme-right terror group, the Organisation armée secrète.

He published his memoirs, Service secret 1940-1945, in which he argued that the situation of Salan in 1962 was similar to that experienced by de Gaulle in 1940.

== Personal life ==
In January 1914, he married Véra Bernstein (1892–1971). They had five children. Their son, Serge. was arrested by the Gestapo and deported. After Véra's death in July 1971, Groussard married his former partner and secretary, Suzanne Kohn (sister of Antoinette Sasse and former collaborator of Jean Moulin) in December 1971. He died on 22 March 1980 in Opio, Alpes-Maritimes.

== Awards ==
- Croix de Guerre (1914–1918)
- Commandeur de la Légion d'honneur

== Publications ==
- Chemins secrets, Bader-Dufour, Mulhouse/Paris/Lausanne, 1948
- Service secret: 1940-1945, La Table ronde, Paris, 1964
- L'armée et ses drames La Table Ronde, Paris, 1968
