= Glade of the Armistice =

French WWI national and war memorial

- France
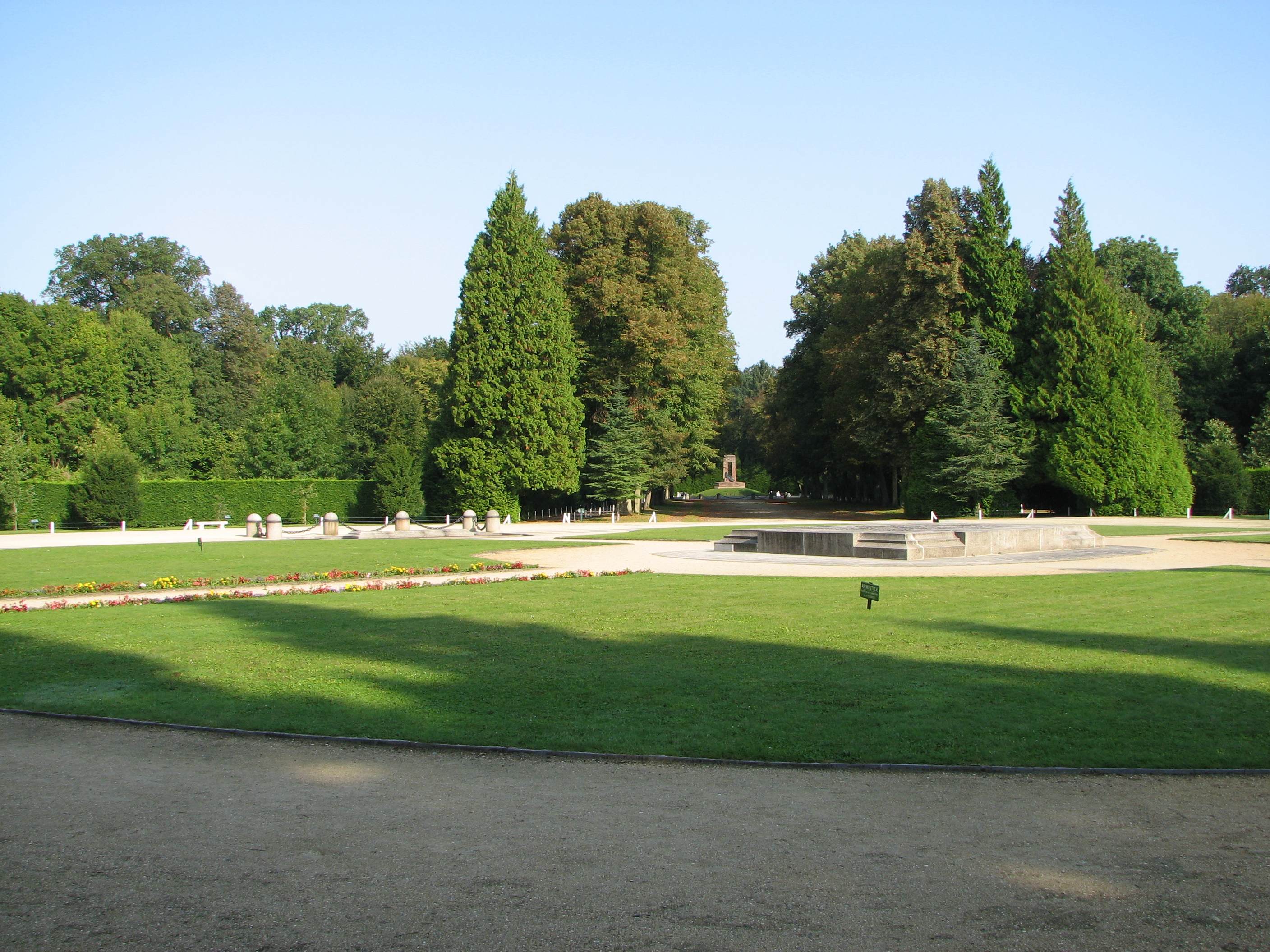
- The Glade of Armistice
- For French soldiers of World War I and signing of the Armistice
- Location: 49°25′38″N 2°54′23″E
- "1914-1918 / To the heroic soldiers of France / Defenders of the Fatherland and of Justice / Glorious liberators of Alsace-Lorraine"

The Glade of the Armistice (French: Clairière de l'Armistice) is a French war memorial in the Forest of Compiègne in Picardy, France, near the city of Compiègne approximately 60 kilometres (37 mi) north of Paris. It was built at the location where the Germans signed the Armistice of 11 November 1918 that ended World War I. During World War II, Adolf Hitler chose the same spot for the French and Germans to sign the Armistice of 22 June 1940 after Germany won the Battle of France. The site was destroyed by the Germans but rebuilt after the war.

Today, the Glade of the Armistice contains a statue of World War I French military leader and Allied supreme commander Marshal Ferdinand Foch, and the reconstructed Alsace–Lorraine memorial, depicting a German Eagle impaled by a sword.

== History ==
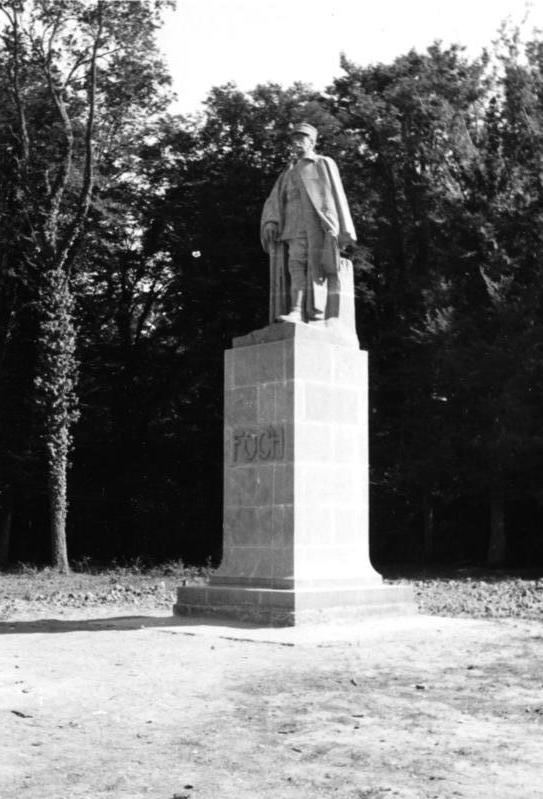
The statue of Foch in 1940

The Armistice of 11 November 1918 was signed in one of the rail carriages ("Le Wagon de l'Armistice") of Foch's private train in Rethondes. The carriage was Compagnie Internationale des Wagons-Lits (CIWL) No. 2419D.

Foch had convened the armistice talks deep in the forest beside the small village of Rethondes, because he wanted to shield the meeting from intrusive journalists, as well as spare the German delegation any hostile demonstrations by French locals.

The carriage was put back into regular service with the Compagnie des Wagons-Lits, but after a short period it was withdrawn to be attached to the French presidential train. From April 1921 to April 1927, it was on exhibition in the Cour des Invalides in Paris.

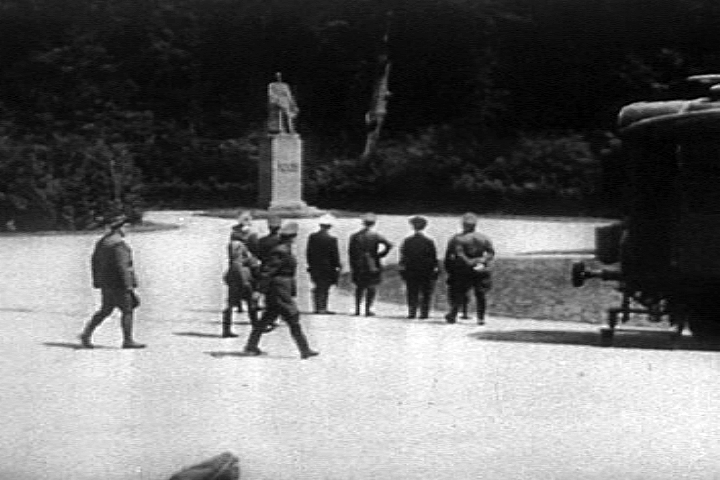
Adolf Hitler (hand on hip) looking at the statue of Foch before the 1940 armistice negotiations at Compiègne (21 June 1940)

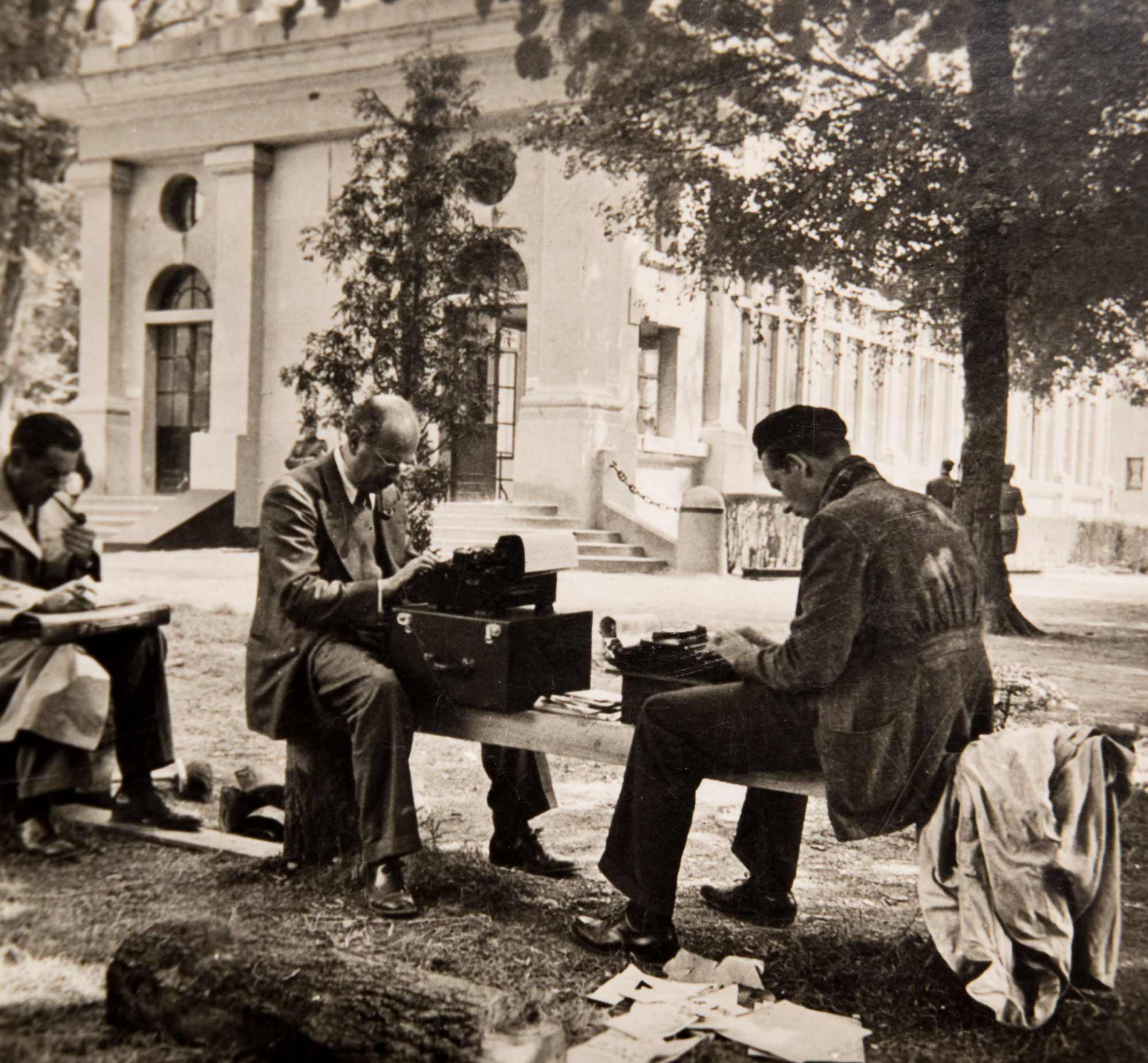
CBS war correspondent William Shirer in Compiegne, reporting on the 1940 armistice. The building houses the railway carriage in which the armistices were signed.

In November 1927, this carriage was ceremonially returned to the forest in the exact spot where the Armistice was signed, a part of the newly constructed monument the Glade of the Armistice. Marshal Foch, General Weygand and many others watched it being placed in a specially constructed building, near, but not on, the exact place of the signing.

There it remained, a monument to the defeat of Imperial Germany and the triumph of France, until 22 June 1940, when German staff cars bearing Adolf Hitler, Hermann Göring, Wilhelm Keitel, Joachim von Ribbentrop and others swept into the Clairière and, in that same carriage, having been moved back to the 1918 signing-place, the World War II armistice with France was signed; this time with Germany triumphant. CBS war correspondent William Shirer, who afterwards wrote the book The Rise and Fall of the Third Reich, was present, and wrote of Hitler's reaction to seeing the monument:

"Through my glasses I saw the Führer stop, glance at the [Alsace-Lorraine] monument. ... Then he read the inscription on the great granite block in the center of the clearing: Here on the eleventh of November 1918 succumbed the criminal pride of the German empire ... vanquished by the free peoples which it tried to enslave." I look for the expression on Hitler's face. I am but fifty yards from him and see him through my glasses as though he were directly in front of me. I have seen that face many times at the great moments of his life. But today! It is afire with scorn, anger, hate, revenge, triumph. He steps off the monument and contrives to make even this gesture a masterpiece of contempt. He glances back at it contemptuous, angry. ... Suddenly, as though his face were not giving quite complete expression to his feelings, he throws his whole body into harmony with his mood. He swiftly snaps his hands on his hips, arches his shoulders, plants his feet wide apart. It is a magnificent gesture of defiance, of burning contempt.

== Destruction of the armistice site in Compiègne ==
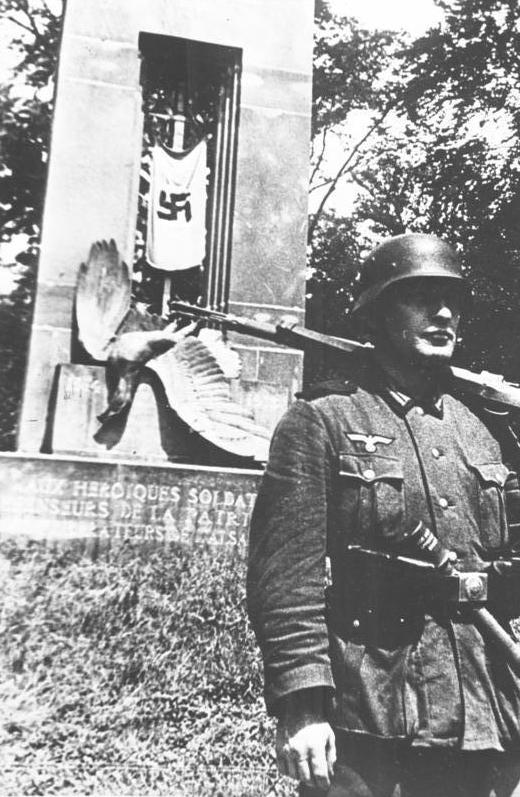
The 1918 Alsace-Lorraine monument, depicting a German Eagle impaled by a sword, in 1940 covered with the Third Reich flag and guarded by a German soldier

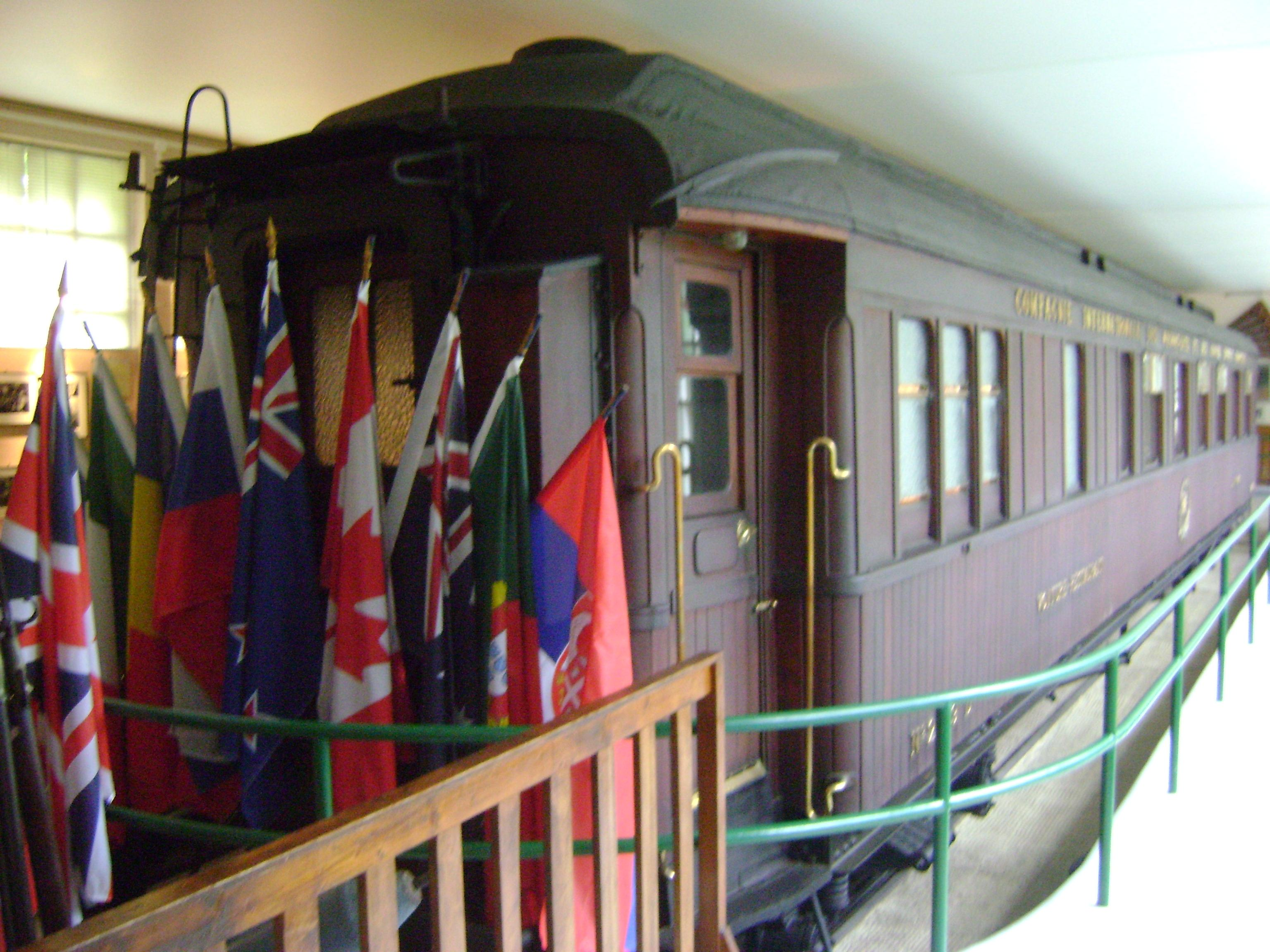
A replica of the railway carriage where the 1918 and 1940 armistices were signed, at the Clairière de l'Armistice (Rethondes) museum

The Armistice site was demolished on Hitler's orders three days after the signing of the 1940 armistice. The carriage itself was taken to Berlin as a trophy of war, along with pieces of a large stone tablet which bore the inscription (in French):

Here on the eleventh of November 1918 succumbed the criminal pride of the German Reich. Vanquished by the free peoples which it tried to enslave.

The Alsace-Lorraine monument was also destroyed and all evidence of the site was obliterated, with the notable exception of the statue of Marshal Foch: Hitler intentionally ordered it to be left intact, so that it would be honouring only a wasteland.

The railway carriage itself was later exhibited in Berlin. After the Allied advance into Germany in early 1945, the carriage was removed by the Germans for safe-keeping to the town of Crawinkel in Thuringia, but as an American armoured column entered the town, the detachment of the SS guarding it destroyed it by fire and buried the remains. Some pieces were however preserved by a private person; they are also exhibited at Compiègne.

After the war, the Compiègne site was restored by German POW labour. On Armistice Day, 1950, a replacement carriage was re-dedicated: an identical Compagnie des Wagon-Lits carriage, No. 2439, built in 1913 in the same batch as the original and also part of Foch's private train during the 1918 signing, was renumbered No. 2419D.
