= Order of the Francisque =

Order and medal awarded by the French Vichy Regime

Official emblem of Marshal Pétain and de facto coat of arms of the Vichy regime.

The Order of the Gallic Francisque (French: L’ordre de la Francisque gallique) is an order and medal which was awarded by the Vichy Regime, the Nazi-aligned government of France during World War II.

The order was created by the arrêtés of 26 May 1941, the law of 16 May 1941, and the decrees of 14 March 1942 and 31 July 1942.

The Francisque was the personal symbol of Philippe Pétain, Marshal of France and Head of State.

Although the personal symbol of Philippe Pétain, the francisque was gradually used on official documents as the coat of arms of the Vichy regime.

== Description ==
Although called francisque, the medal and generally speaking the symbol used on official document is a labrys.

== Notable holders ==
All in all, 2626 persons received the order of the Francisque. The official number remains unknown as the archives listing all the holders burnt at the end of the Second World War. The holders include:

- The widow of the général Charles Huntziger was the first to receive the order of the francisque;
- The Lumière brothers in 1941;
- Raymond Marcellin;
- François Mitterrand (1943), later French president, recipient number 2202;
- Raoul Salan;
- Marc Boegner, reverend of the French Protestant Church and president of the Protestant Federation of France;
- Paul Dungler;
- Charles Vanel, actor;
- Pierre Fresnay, actor;
- Edmond Giscard d'Estaing, father of the former French president Valéry Giscard d'Estaing;
- Jacques Ploncard d'Assac, journalist and writer;
- Charles Maurras, journalist and writer;
- Henry Coston, journalist and writer;
- Maxime Real del Sarte, sculptor;
- Antoine Pinay, French politician;
- Henri Pourrat, actor;
- Xavier Vallat, French politician;
- Jean-Louis Tixier-Vignancour, French politician;
- Pierre Dunoyer de Segonzac, founder of the École des cadres d'Uriage;
- Paul Morand, writer;
- Louis II, Prince of Monaco;
- Émile Roblot, Minister of State of Monaco
- René de Chambrun, lawyer, and son-in-law of Pierre Laval;
- Maurice Couve de Murville, French politician and former Prime Minister;
- Jean Védrine, member of the French resistance, affiliated to the resistance network of François Mitterrand, father of Hubert Védrine, former French minister of foreign affairs;
