= Compiègne Wagon =

Train carriage

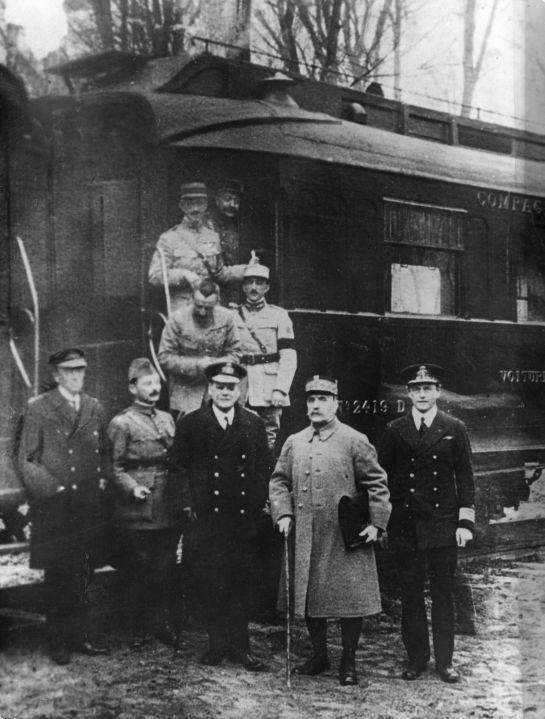
Marshal Ferdinand Foch, second from right, pictured outside the Compiègne Wagon after the German Empire agreed to the armistice that ended World War I in November 1918.

The Compiègne Wagon (2419D) was a train carriage in which the armistices of the First World War and the Battle of France in World War II were signed. The wagon, which was a dining car, hosted both treaty meetings at the same spot in the Forest of Compiègne, France, almost 22 years apart. It was built by the Belgian-founded French company Compagnie Internationale des Wagons-Lits in May 1914. The company was known for supplying and operating luxury trains with sleepers and dining cars.

During the First World War, the Compiègne Wagon had been the dining car on the personal train of Marshal Ferdinand Foch. In November 1918, it hosted the armistice talks between the Allied Powers and the German Empire. After the war, it was put on museum display at the Glade of the Armistice in France. However, after the victorious invasion of France by Nazi Germany, Adolf Hitler, in a symbolic act to show total subjugation of the French, had the wagon moved back to its exact spot of the 1918 Armistice for the signing of the 1940 Armistice. After the signing, the Glade of the Armistice was destroyed and the Compiègne Wagon was taken to Germany. It was destroyed by the SS near the end of World War II.

In 1950, Compagnie Internationale des Wagons-Lits donated an identical dining car (from the same fleet) to the museum to replace the original Compiègne Wagon. It remains on display at the Glade of Armistice museum, Rethondes.

== History ==
=== First World War ===
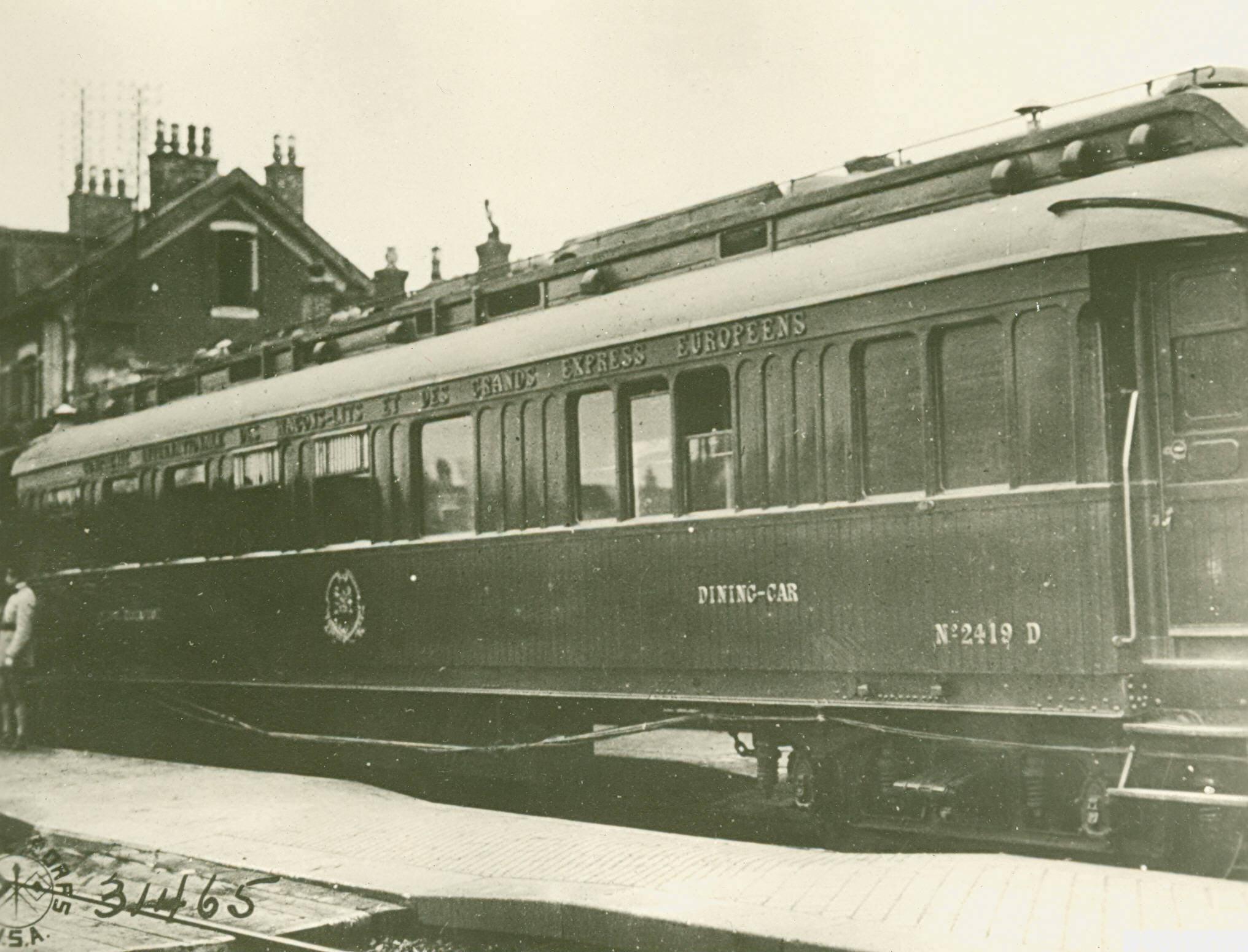
The Compiègne Wagon (2419D) was part of Marshal Ferdinand Foch's personal train in 1918.

The Compiègne Wagon was built in May 1914 in Saint-Denis as dining car No. 2419D. The wooden carriage with a steel frame was one among 22 roughly identical restaurant cars of the 2403–2424 series. A metal frame with tie rods for better rigidity was added with a varnished teak wood: a usual practice in the early 20th century. It was used throughout the First World War in that capacity for Compagnie Internationale des Wagons-Lits, the company best known for operating the Orient Express. In October 1918, after two years of being stored in Clichy in the northern part of Paris, the wagon was commandeered by the French Army and converted into the office and mobile headquarters of Ferdinand Foch, the Supreme Allied Commander, who began using it from 28 October 1918. The famous French general was promoted to marshal as late as 7 August 1918, two months before getting his own train.

On 8 November 1918, Foch and representatives from the Allied Powers met representatives from the German Empire to discuss the terms of armistice in the then-called "Wagon of Compiègne". The agreement was signed in the carriage on 11 November, and was the final ceasefire which ended fighting in the First World War; the other Central Powers had already reached agreements with the Allied Powers to end hostilities.

=== Inter-war period ===
The car was later returned to Compagnie Internationale des Wagons-Lits and briefly resumed service as a dining car. On 1 October 1919, it was donated to the Army Museum. The wagon was on display in the Musée's Cour des Invalides from 27 April 1921 to 8 April 1927.

At the request of the mayor of Compiègne, and with the support of the American Arthur Henry Fleming, the car was restored at the workshops of Saint-Denis, which took half a year, and returned to Compiègne in late October 1927. It was housed in a specially created museum building as part of the "Glade of the Armistice" historic monument, with the car a few meters from the exact site of the signing ceremony. The official opening of the carriage shelter was set on 11 November 1927 to commemorate the ninth anniversary of the Armistice agreement, and the fifth year of the memorial.

=== Second World War ===
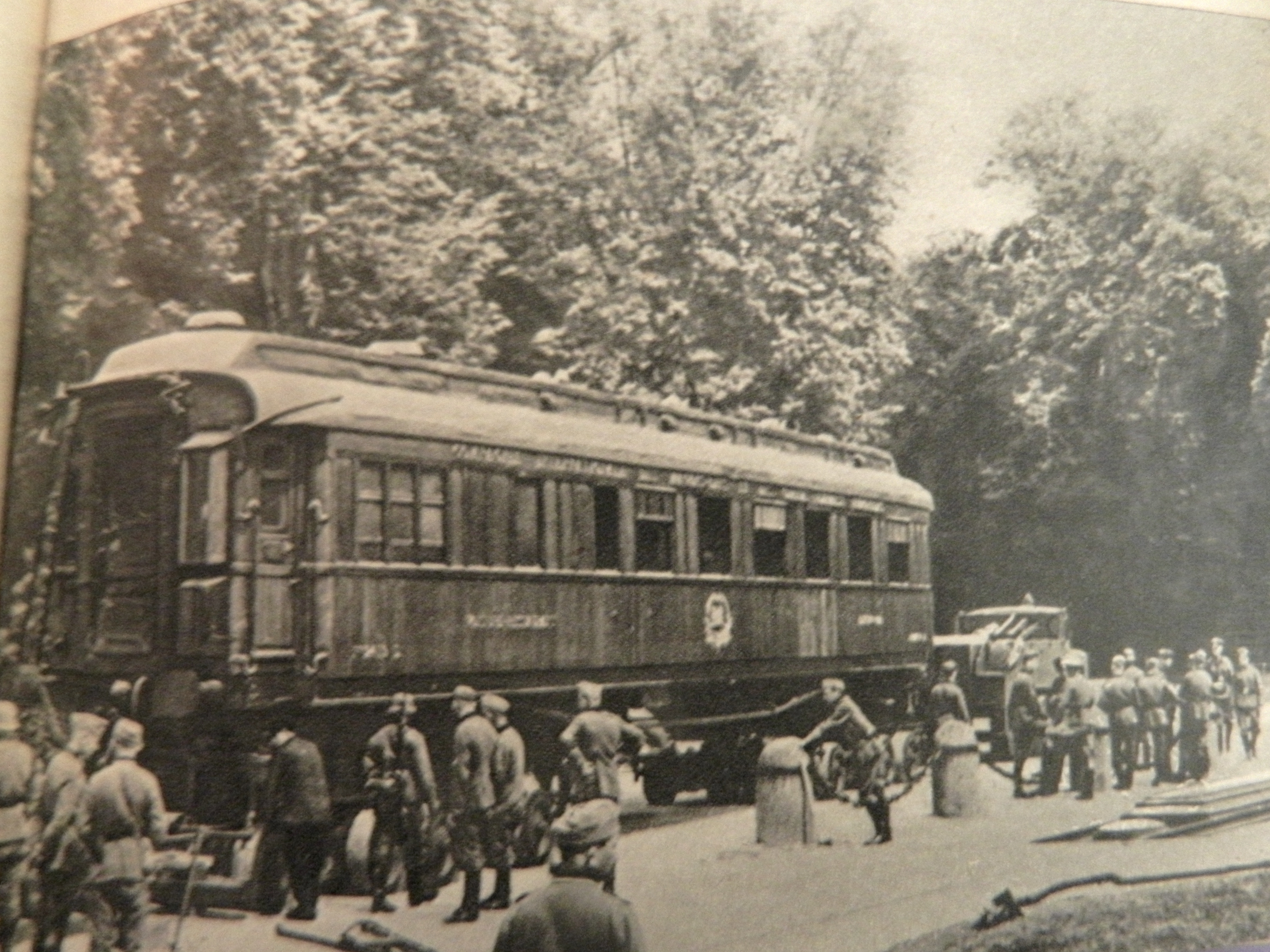
The Compiègne Wagon (2419D) being pulled out of its museum by the Wehrmacht on 21 June 1940 in preparation for the signing of the French Armistice the next day.

Following Nazi Germany's decisive victory in the Battle of France, Adolf Hitler ordered that the same railway carriage in which the 1918 Armistice had been signed be re-used for the second "armistice at Compiègne". On 21 June 1940, the car was removed from its museum building and placed on the exact spot it had been in 1918. On 22 June 1940 the signing took place. American journalist William Shirer, who was present, reported:

"I am but fifty yards from [Hitler] ... I have seen that face many times at the great moments of his life. But today! It is afire with scorn, anger, hate, revenge, triumph."

Hitler sat in the same chair in which Marshal Ferdinand Foch had sat when he faced the representatives of the defeated German Empire. After listening to the reading of the preamble, Hitler—in a calculated gesture of disdain for the French delegates—exited the carriage, as Foch had done in 1918, leaving negotiations to the chief of the Oberkommando der Wehrmacht General Wilhelm Keitel. The negotiations lasted one day, until the evening of 22 June 1940 when an agreement was reached.

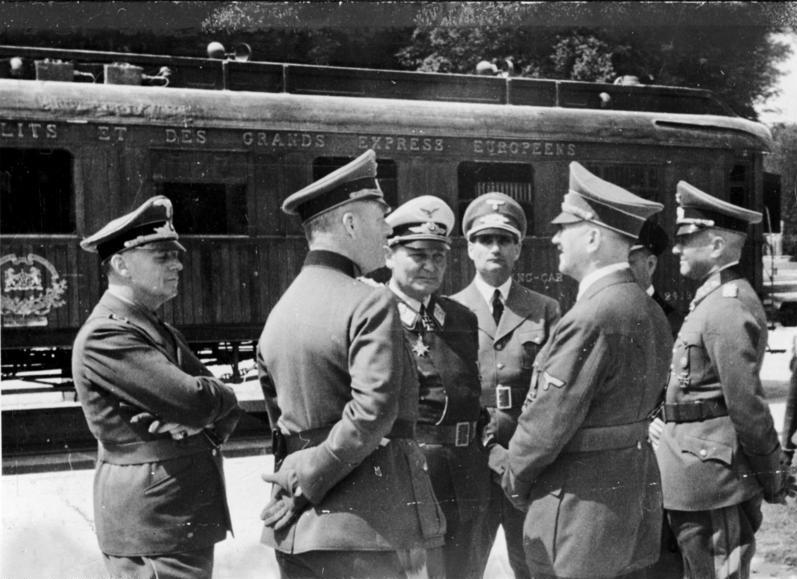
Left to right: Joachim von Ribbentrop, Wilhelm Keitel, Hermann Göring, Rudolf Hess, Adolf Hitler, Erich Raeder partially obscured and Walther von Brauchitsch in front of the Armistice carriage

Three days after armistice meeting, the Glade of the Armistice was destroyed on Hitler's orders. The railway car was taken to Berlin where it went on display from 5 July, first next to the Brandenburg Gate, and then later on Museum Island.

In 1944, the wagon was sent to Thuringia, in central Germany. Then it was moved to Ruhla and later Crawinkel, Gotha, where there was an extensive railway tunnel system. However by the end of the war, the car had been destroyed. Two versions exists to its demise. Some SS veterans and civilian eyewitnesses claim the wagon was hit by an air attack near Ohrdruf, while it was still in Thuringia in April 1944. Other evidence suggests it was destroyed by the SS with fire and/or dynamite as the advancing U.S. Army neared the area in March 1945. Overall it is believed the car was destroyed in 1945 in the latter months of WWII. A small memorial sign has been erected in the Crawinkel commune on the site where the car was destroyed in 1945.

== Replica ==
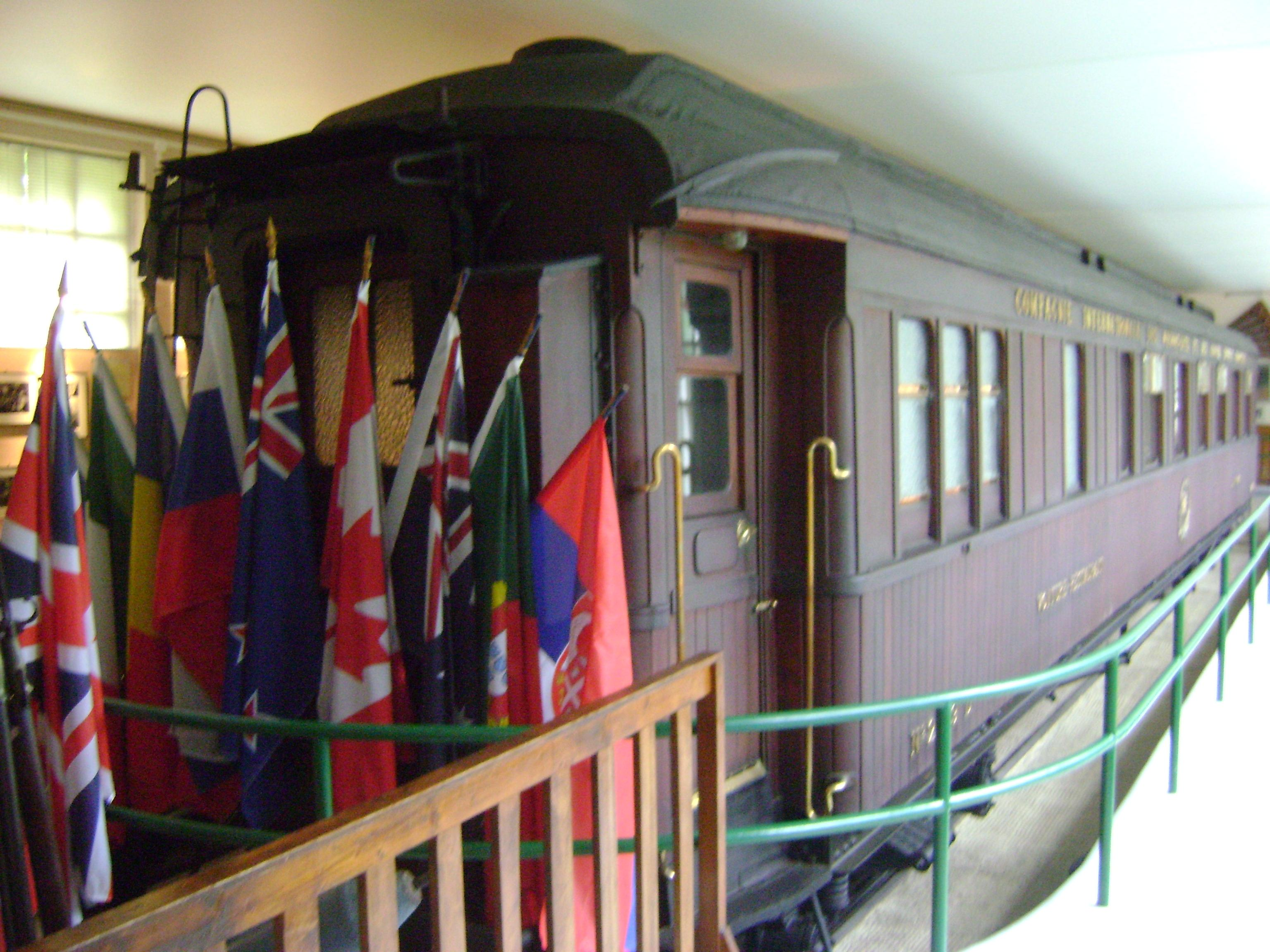
Replica (2439D) in the Glade of Armistice museum

In 1950, French manufacturer Wagons-Lits, the company that ran the Orient Express, donated a car (2439D) of the same series to the museum. It is identical to the destroyed historical original with polished wooden finishes to studded, leather-bound chairs. The car (2439D) was among those 37 carriages created in two series between 1913–1914. The donated car had been part of Foch's private train during the 1918 signing. The inauguration ceremony took place on 11 November 1950 when the car (2439D) was renumbered No. 2419D. It is parked beside the display of the original car's remains: a few fragments of bronze decoration and two access ramps.

== See also ==
- Iron diplomacy
