= Claude Quétel =

French historian

- Born: 1939 (age 85–86); Bernières-sur-Mer, Calvados, France
- Occupation: Historian

Claude Quétel (born Bernières-sur-Mer, 1939) is a French historian. The author of two dozen books, he has won a number of prizes for his work, including the Prix Marianne 2015 for L'effrayant docteur Petiot - fou ou coupable?, the Prix Therouanne 1982 for De par le Roy. Essai sur les lettres de cachet and the Prix Therouanne 1989 (silver medal) for La Bastille. His History of Syphilis has been translated into English.
