= 2nd Regiment of Senegalese Tirailleurs =

Regiment of Senegalese Tirailleurs in the French Army

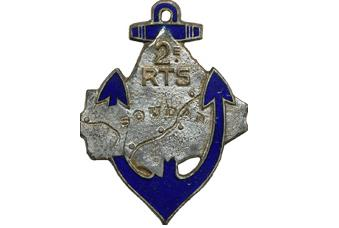
- Active: 1892 to 1946
- Allegiance: France
- Type: Tirailleur
- Role: Infantry

The 2nd Regiment of Senegalese Tirailleurs was a regiment composed of African infantry formed by the French Army. It was created by decree on 23 April 1892 as the Régiment de Tirailleurs Soudanais. Godefroy Cavaignac, the Minister of Marine and of the Colonies, reported to President Carnot, that the regiment consisted of six companies of Senegalese Tirailleurs at the time stationed in Sudan with two additional companies of Sudanese auxiliaries. They participated in the capture of Sikasso in 1898.

== Creation and various names ==
- 1892: Creation of the Régiment de Tirailleurs Soudanais
- 1900: Renamed 2nd Régiment de Tirailleurs Sénégalais
- 2 September 1939: Renamed 2nd Régiment Mobile de Tirailleurs Sénégalais
- 1 April 1940: Went back to 2nd Régiment de Tirailleurs Sénégalais
- 1 October 1940: became Régiment de Tirailleurs Sénégalais du Soudan
- 31 December 1946: Dissolved
