= Rethondes =

- Commune
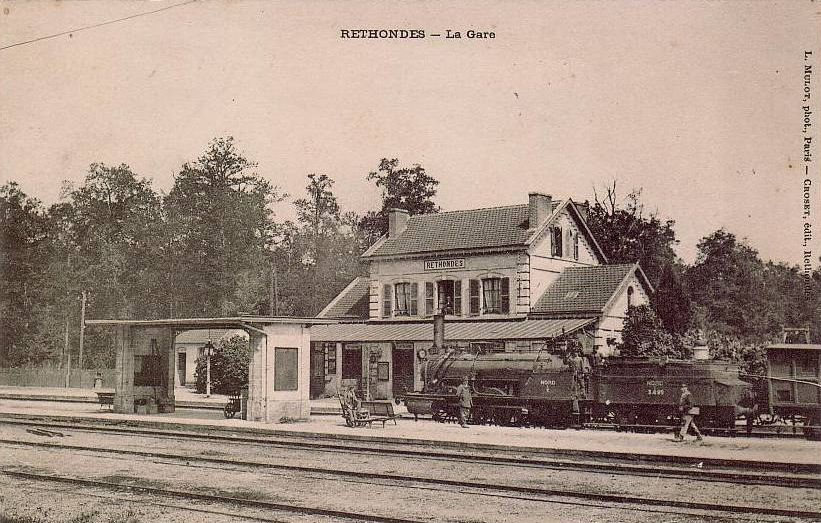
- The railway station in Rethondes

- Coat of arms
- Location of Rethondes
- Location within France Location within Hauts-de-France
- Coordinates: 49°24′58″N 2°56′24″E
- Country: France
- Region: Hauts-de-France
- Department: Oise
- Arrondissement: Compiègne
- Canton: Compiègne-1

Government
  - Mayor (2020–2026): Jean-Jacques Lecat
- Area^{1}: 9.48 km^{2} (3.66 sq mi)
- Elevation: 38 m (125 ft)
- Highest elevation: 110 m (360 ft)
- Lowest elevation: 33 m (108 ft)
- Population (2023): 647
  - Density: 68.2/km^{2} (177/sq mi)
- Time zone: UTC+01:00 (CET)
  - Summer (DST): UTC+02:00 (CEST)
- INSEE/Postal code: 60534 /60153
- ^{1} French Land Register data, which excludes lakes, ponds, glaciers > 1 km^{2} (0.386 sq mi or 247 acres) and river estuaries.

Rethondes (French pronunciation: [ʁətɔ̃d]) is a commune in the Oise department in northern France. It is associated with the signing of the armistice of 11 November 1918, which ended World War I, although the actual location of the signing was on the other side of the Aisne in the commune of Compiègne. The same spot was also where Nazi Germany had Vichy government sign the armistice of 22 June 1940, during World War II.

== Population ==
Historical population
Year	Pop.	±% p.a.
1968	451	—
1975	458	+0.22%
1982	504	+1.38%
1990	591	+2.01%
1999	668	+1.37%
2007	709	+0.75%
2012	743	+0.94%
2017	656	−2.46%
2023	647	−0.23%
Source: INSEE

== See also ==
- Communes of the Oise department
