= Paul Dungler =

Paul Dungler (1902 in Thann, Haut-Rhin – 1974 in Colmar) was a French industrialist, royalist militant and Resistance worker.

Dungler joined the ranks of Action Française then of La Cagoule, and launched himself into politics during the inter-war period. Upon France's defeat in 1940, he was in Périgord where he returned to Alsace to join the Resistance. He returned secretly to Thann in Alsace on 25 August 1940, and founded the 7e Colonne d'Alsace, registered at London under the name of the Martial network.

Général Giraud's escape was one of the network's greatest successes. Dungler was one of the initiators of the Organisation de résistance de l'armée (ORA) and involved in the founding of Groupes Mobiles d'Alsace. Threatened with arrest, Dungler decided to take refuge in the unoccupied zone of France, all the while planning secret operations through London. In 1943 he negotiated with General Charles de Gaulle and the Americans at Algiers so that Alsace would be present in the next wars of liberation.
