= Armistice of 22 June 1940 =

Franco-German armistice in World War II

Coordinates: 49°25′39″N 02°54′22″E

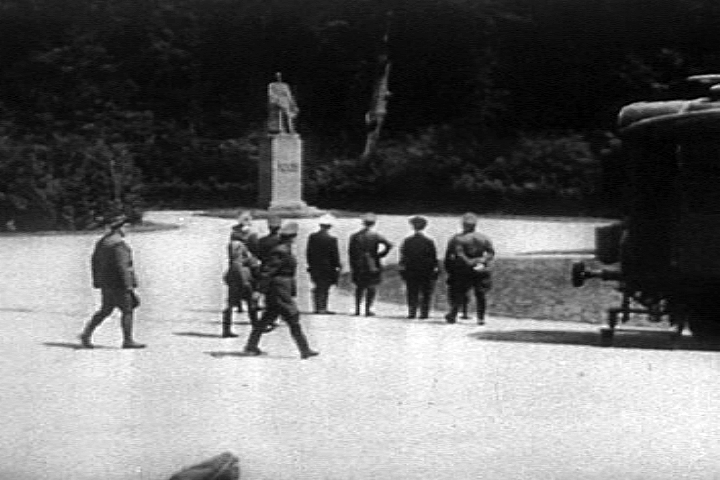
Adolf Hitler (hand on hip) looking at the statue of Ferdinand Foch before starting the negotiations for the armistice at Compiègne, France (21 June 1940)

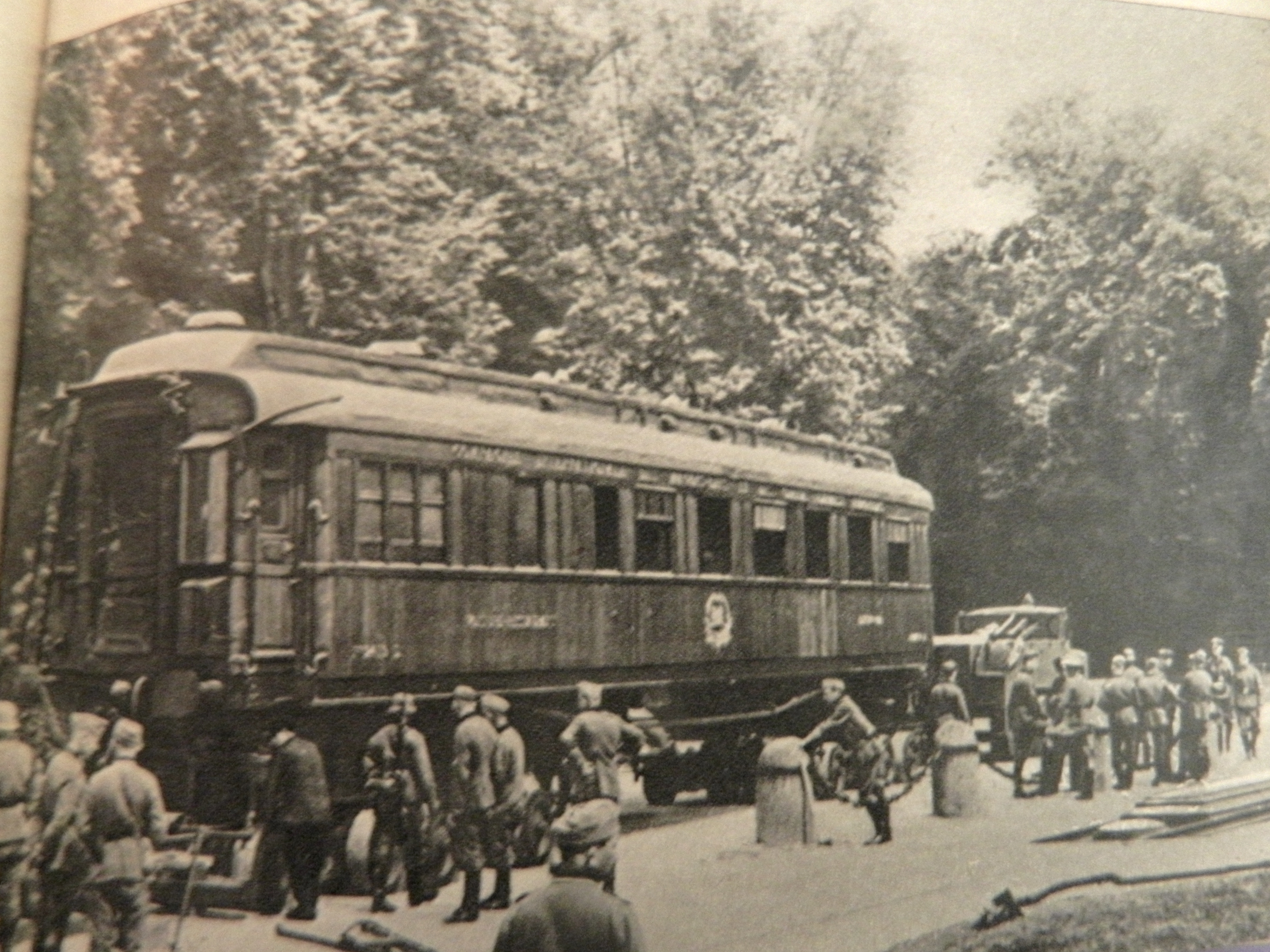
Ferdinand Foch's railway car, at the same location as after World War I, prepared by the Germans for the second armistice at Compiègne, June 1940

The Armistice of 22 June 1940 (French: Armistice du 22 juin 1940; German: Waffenstillstand vom 22. Juni), sometimes referred to as the Second Armistice at Compiègne, was an agreement signed at 18:36 on 22 June 1940 near Compiègne, France, by officials of Nazi Germany and the French Third Republic. It became effective at midnight on 25 June. Signatories for Germany included Colonel General Wilhelm Keitel, head of the German armed forces (OKW), while those on the French side held lower ranks, led by General Charles Huntziger.

Following the decisive German victory in the Battle of France, the armistice established a German occupation zone in Northern and Western France that encompassed about three-fifths of France's European territory, including all English Channel and Atlantic Ocean ports. The remainder of the country was to be left unoccupied, although the new regime that replaced the Third Republic was mutually recognised as the legitimate government of all of Metropolitan France except Alsace–Lorraine.

The French were also permitted to retain control of all of their non-European territories. Adolf Hitler deliberately chose Compiègne Forest as the site to sign the armistice because of its symbolic role as the site of the Armistice of 11 November 1918 that signaled the end of World War I with Germany's surrender.

== Battle of France ==
The best, most modernised French armies had been sent north and lost in the resulting encirclement; the French had lost their best heavy weaponry and their best armoured formations. Between May and June, French forces were in general retreat and Germany threatened to occupy Paris. The French government was forced to relocate to Bordeaux on 10 June to avoid capture and declared Paris to be an open city the same day.

The proposal of a Franco-British Union to shore up support for Paul Reynaud's government following the fall of Paris split support. With many pro-Armistice ministers in the cabinet, such as the Deputy Prime Minister Philippe Pétain, and the commander-in-chief of the French Army General Weygand, Reynaud resigned on 16 June. Pétain became prime minister. While French resistance continued with the Free French Forces led by Charles de Gaulle, the surrender of Metropolitan France ended any further attempts by the British to unite the two countries.

By 22 June, the German Armed Forces (Wehrmacht) had losses of 27,000 dead, more than 111,000 wounded and 18,000 missing. French losses were 92,000 dead and more than 200,000 wounded. The British Expeditionary Force suffered 68,000 casualties, with around 10,000 killed.

== Choice of Compiègne ==
When Adolf Hitler received word from the French government that it wished to negotiate an armistice, he selected Compiègne Forest as the place for the negotiations. Compiègne had been the site of the 1918 Armistice, which ended World War I with Germany's surrender. As an act of revenge Hitler held the signing in the Compiègne Wagon, the same rail carriage where the Germans had signed the 1918 Armistice. The preamble describes the German view of the World War I Armistice, including accusations of Allied breaches. The preamble states, "On 11 November 1918, in this railcar, the time of suffering for the German people began." The preamble goes on to claim that the choice of the forest of Compiègne for this new armistice will re-establish "justice", and end Germany's "deepest humiliation".

In the last sentence of the preamble, the drafters inserted: "However, Germany does not have the intention to use the armistice conditions and armistice negotiations as a form of humiliation against such a valiant opponent", referring to the French forces. In Article 3, Clause 2, the drafters said that Germany did not intend to heavily occupy north-west France after the cessation of hostilities with Britain.

William Shirer, who was present on that day, reported, "I am but fifty yards from him. [...] I have seen that face many times at the great moments of his life. But today! It is afire with scorn, anger, hate, revenge, triumph." Then, on 21 June 1940, in the same railway carriage in which the 1918 Armistice had been signed (removed from a museum building and placed exactly where it was in 1918), Hitler sat in the same chair in which Marshal Ferdinand Foch had sat when he faced the representatives of the defeated German Empire. After listening to the reading of the preamble, Hitler—in a calculated gesture of disdain for the French delegates—exited the carriage, as Foch had done in 1918, leaving the negotiations to the chief of the Oberkommando der Wehrmacht (High Command of the Armed Forces), General Wilhelm Keitel. The negotiations lasted one day, until the evening of 22 June 1940: General Huntziger had to discuss the terms by phone with the French government representatives, who had fled to Bordeaux, mainly with the newly nominated defence minister, General Maxime Weygand.

== Terms ==
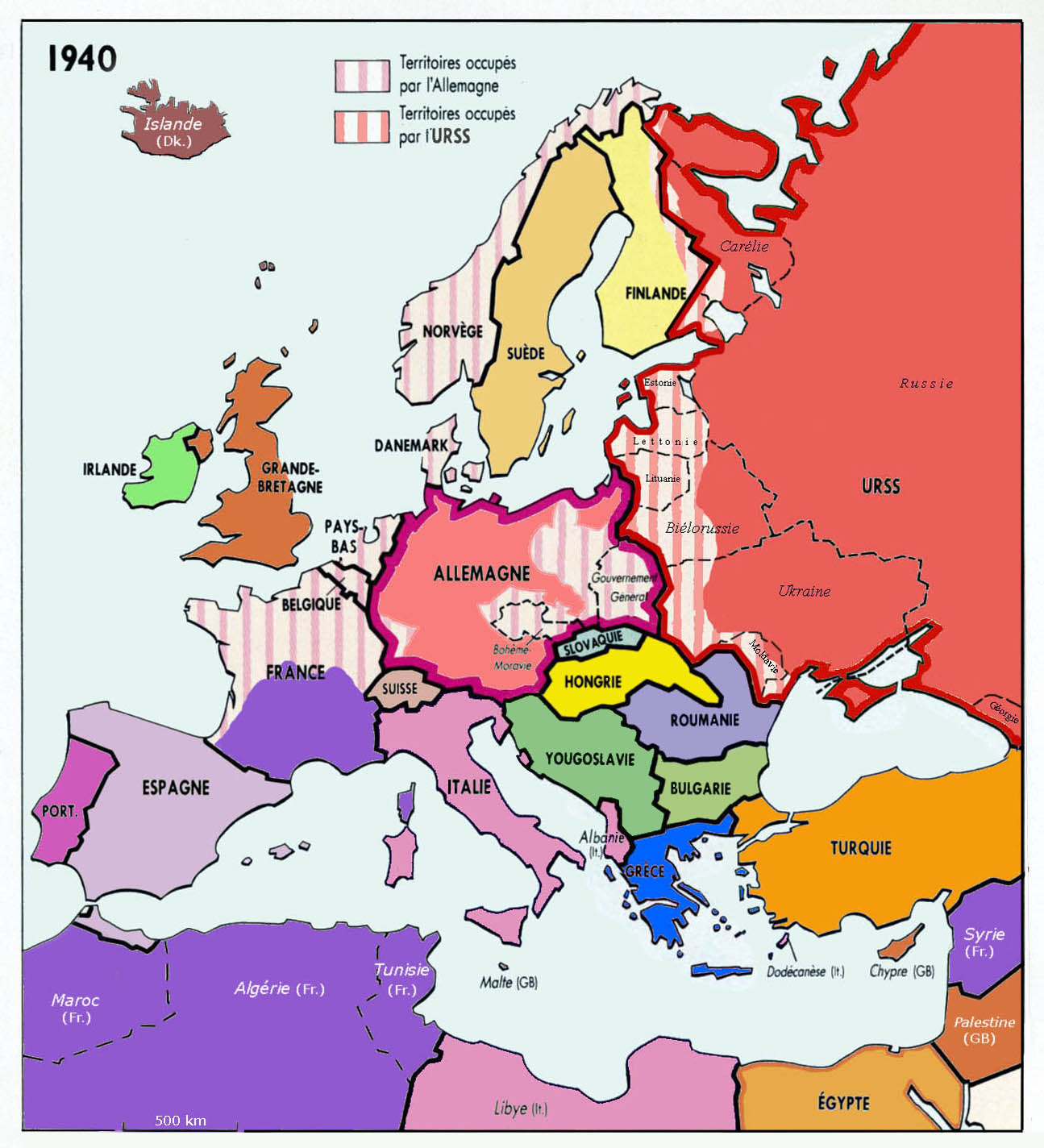
The map shows the division of France as per all the historical realities of the era: Nazi Germany annexed Alsace Lorraine, and occupied northern metropolitan France and all the Atlantic coastline down to the border with Spain. That left the rest of France, including the remaining two-fifths of southern and eastern metropolitan France, Overseas France and North Africa unoccupied, and under the control of a collaborationist French government based at the city of Vichy, and headed by Marshal Philippe Pétain.

Fall Rot in June exploited and sealed the German blitzkrieg of Fall Gelb in May

Adolf Hitler had a number of reasons for agreeing to an armistice. He wanted to ensure that France did not continue to fight from French North Africa, and he wanted to ensure that the French Navy was taken out of the war. In addition, leaving a French government in place would relieve Germany of the considerable burden of administering French territory, particularly as he turned his attentions towards Britain. Finally, as Germany lacked a navy sufficient to occupy France's overseas territories, Hitler's only practical recourse to deny the British use of them was to maintain a formally independent and neutral French rump state.

According to William Shirer's book Rise and Fall of the Third Reich, French General Charles Huntziger complained that the armistice terms imposed on France were harsher than those imposed on Germany in 1918. They provided for German occupation of three-fifths of metropolitan France north and west of a line through Geneva and Tours and extending to the Spanish border, so as to give Nazi Germany's Kriegsmarine access to all French Channel and Atlantic ports. All people who had been granted political asylum had to be surrendered and high occupation costs were demanded of France by Germany, approximately 400 million French francs a day. A minimal French Army would be permitted. As one of Hitler's few concessions, the French Navy was to be disarmed but not surrendered, for Hitler realised that pushing France too far could result in France fighting on from the French colonial empire. An unoccupied region in the south, the Zone libre, was left relatively free to be governed by a rump French administration based in Vichy. The Vichy regime also administered the occupied zones (other than Alsace-Lorraine) to some extent, albeit under severe restrictions.

This was envisaged as a temporary treaty until a final peace treaty was negotiated. At the time, both French and Germans thought the occupation would be a provisional state of affairs and last only until Britain came to terms, which they both thought was imminent. For instance, none of the French delegation objected to the stipulation that French soldiers would remain prisoners of war until the cessation of all hostilities. Nearly 1,000,000 Frenchmen were thus forced to spend the next five years in German POW camps. About a third of the initial 1,500,000 prisoners taken were released or exchanged as part of the Germans' Service du Travail Obligatoire forced labour programme by the time the war ended.

A final peace treaty was never negotiated, and the free zone (zone libre) was invaded by Germany and its ally Italy in Case Anton following the invasion of French North Africa by the Allies in November 1942.

Article 19 of the Franco-German armistice required the French state to turn over to German authorities any German national on French territory, who would then frequently face deportation to a concentration camp (the "Surrender on Demand" clause). Keitel gave verbal assurances that this would apply mainly to those refugees who had "fomented the war", a euphemism for Jews, and especially German Jews who until then had enjoyed asylum in France. Keitel also made one other concession, that French aircraft need not be handed over to the Germans.

The French delegation—led by General Charles Huntziger—tried to soften the harsher terms of the armistice, but Keitel replied that they would have to accept or reject the armistice as it was. Given the military situation that France was in, Huntziger had "no choice" but to accede to the armistice terms. The cease-fire went into effect at 00:35 on 25 June 1940, more than two days later, only after another armistice was signed between France and Italy, the main German ally in Europe.

The armistice did have some relative advantages for the French, compared to worse possible outcomes, such as keeping the colonial empire and the fleet, and, by avoiding full occupation and disarmament, the remaining French rump state in the unoccupied zone could enforce a certain de facto independence and neutrality vis-à-vis the Axis.

== Destruction of the armistice site in Compiègne ==
The Armistice site was demolished by the Germans on Hitler's orders three days later. The carriage itself was taken to Berlin as a trophy of war, along with pieces of a large stone tablet. The Alsace-Lorraine Monument (depicting a German Eagle impaled by a sword) was also destroyed and all evidence of the site was obliterated, except notably the statue of Ferdinand Foch; Hitler ordered it to be left intact, so that it would be honoring only a wasteland. The railway carriage was later exhibited in Berlin, and then taken to Crawinkel in Thuringia in 1945, where it was destroyed by SS troops and the remains buried. After the war, the site and memorials were restored by German POW labour.

== See also ==
- Paris Protocols
