= V-1 flying bomb facilities =

World War II sites

V-1 facilities
- Part of Nazi Germany
- locations in France and Germany
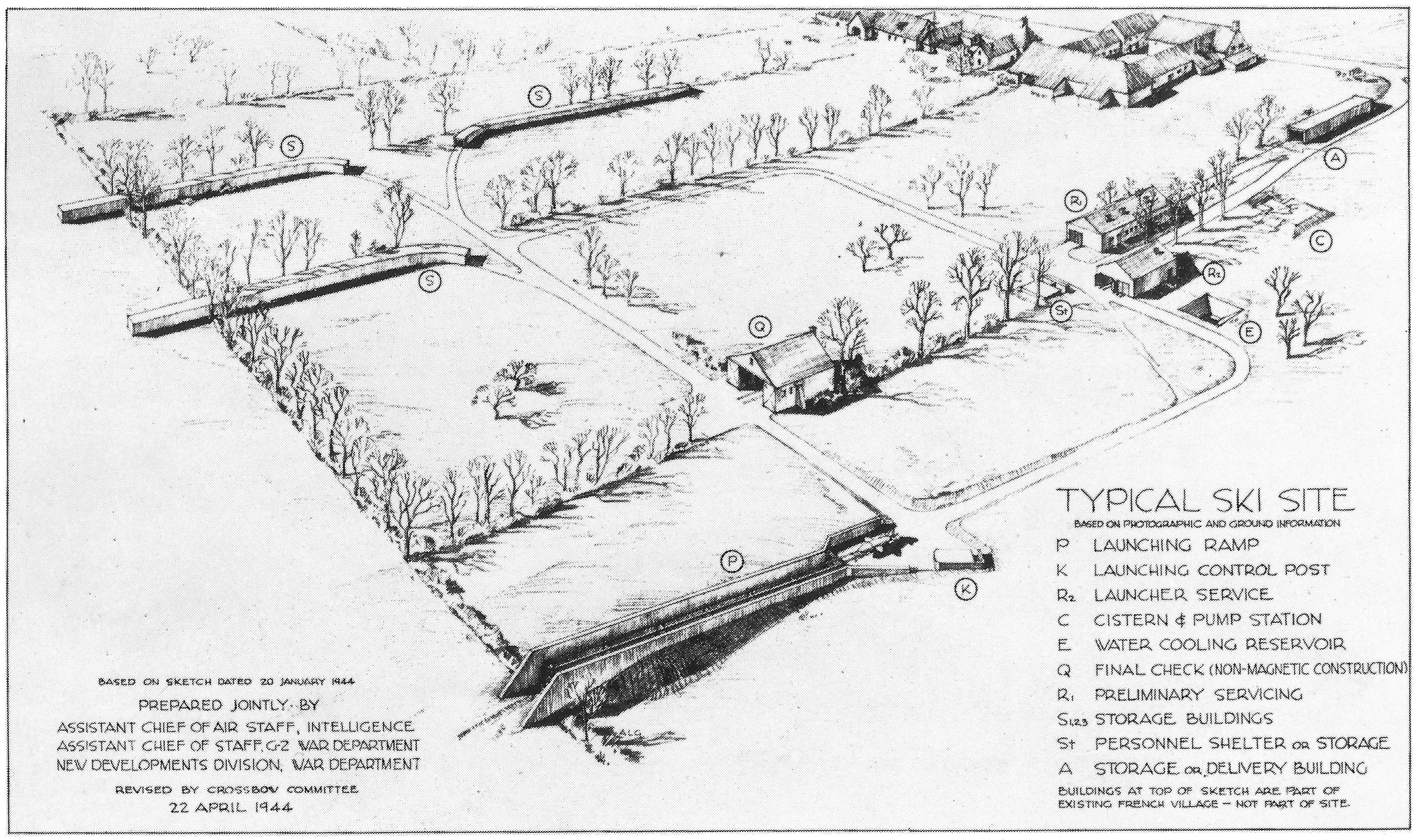
- Diagram for Maisoncelle V-1 "ski site"

Site history
- Built: 1943–1945
- Built by: Organisation Todt et al.
- In use: World War II
- Battles/wars: Operation Crossbow, Operation Aphrodite

To carry out the planned V-1 "flying bomb" attacks on the United Kingdom, Germany built a number of military installations including launching sites and depots. Some of the installations were huge concrete fortifications.

The Allies became aware of the sites at an early stage and carried out multiple bombing raids to destroy them before they came into use.

== Production ==
The robot was sub-contracted by centers like Bruns Werke and Neidersachswerfen's Mittelwerk. The unpiloted aircraft was assembled at the KdF-Stadt (now Wolfsburg) (Note: A different source puts the Fallersleben KdF-Stadt V-1 factory in Wolfsburg; Fallersleben become a district of Wolfsburg in 1972. The Allies also bombed the Opel plant at Rüsselsheim in the incorrect belief that it was a V-1 plant.) Volkswagenwerke ("Volkswagen works", described as "the largest pressed-steel works in Germany") at Fallersleben, and at the Mittelwerk, underground factory in central Germany. Production plants to modify several hundred standard V-1s to Reichenberg R-IV manned aircraft were in the woods of Dannenberg and at Pulverhof, with air-launch trials at Lärz and Rechlin. Flight testing was performed by the Luftwaffe at Peenemünde West and, after the August 1943 Operation Hydra bombing, at Brüsterort. Launch crew training was at Zempin, and the headquarters for the operational unit, Flak-Regiment 155(W), was originally based at Saleux, near Amiens, but was subsequently moved c. December 1943 to a chateau near Creil ("FlakGruppeCreil"), with the unit's telephone relay station at Doullens.

Other V-1 production-related sites included a Barth plant which used forced labor, Buchenwald (V-1 parts), and Allrich in the Harz.

In addition to the storage and launching sites listed below, operational facilities included the airfields for Heinkel He 111 H-22 bombers which air-launched the V-1 from low altitude over the North Sea. The ten-day-long aircrew training was at Peenemünde, and the bases were at Gilze-Rijen airfield, Netherlands, for launches through 15 September 1944, and in Venlo for launches after the first week in December. Aircrews were billeted five miles away at Grossenkneten for secrecy.

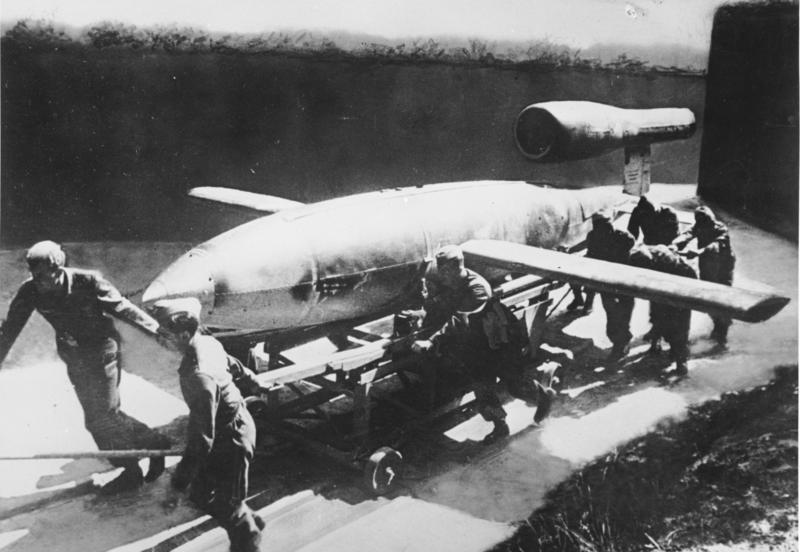
V-1 rolled-out by German crew

== Storage depots ==
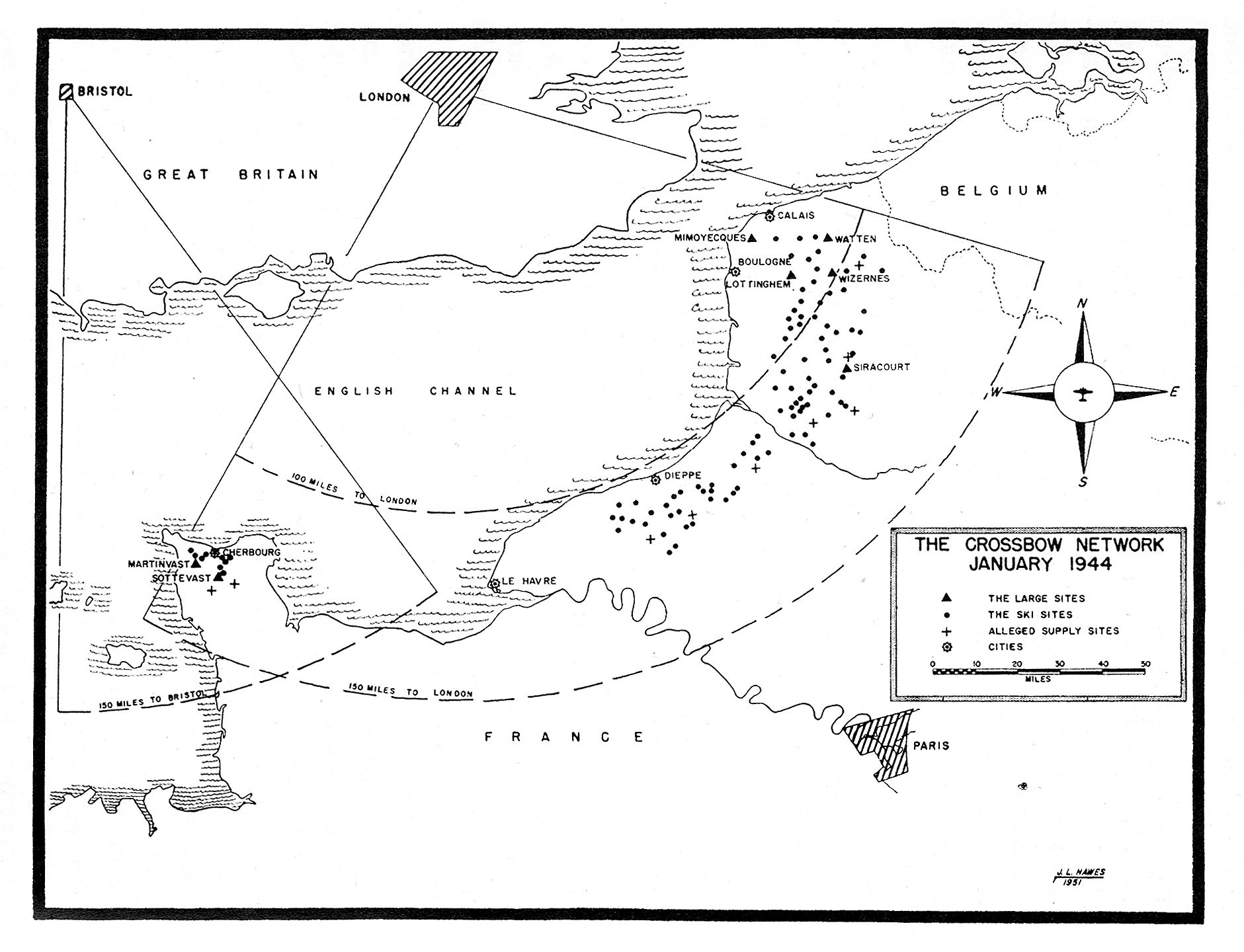
A World War II map shows the two areas where the Germans were setting up their secret "V" weapons to bombard England (right, center). These are the areas in which the Royal Air Force and 8th Air Force heavy bombers concentrated their bombs to destroy the weapons -- part of the pre-invasion plan. This event was given the operational code name Crossbow during World War II.

To supply the V-1 flying bomb launch sites in the Calais region, construction began on several storage depots in August 1943. Sites at Biennais, Brécourt, Couville, Oisemont Neuville-au-Bois, and Saint-Martin-l'Hortier were not completed. An RCAF Halifax pilot's logbook describes the target of his raids on "flying-bomb sites" on July 1, 4, and 5, 1944, as "Biennais #1", "Biennais #2," and "Biennais #3". This suggests that these storage sites were perhaps not completed because they were destroyed prior to completion.

The completed sites were:

- Domléger near Abbeville – bombed on June 14 and 16, and on July 4, 1944.
- Renescure near Saint-Omer – finished in November 1943, it was bombed by the USAAF on June 16, 1944, by 48 Consolidated B-24 Liberators and on July 2 by 21.
- Sautricourt near Saint-Pol (bombed June 16, 1944).

To serve the ten launch sites planned for Normandy, a depot was constructed at Beauvais. It was bombed June 14, 15 and 16, 1944.

A depot to serve Cherbourg launches was built near Valognes. By February/March 1944, a plan for three new underground V-1 storage sites was put into effect. The Nucourt limestone cave complex between Pontoise and Gisors was bombed on June 22, 1944 with 298 V-1s buried or severely damaged.One in the Rilly-la-Montagne railway tunnel was attacked by the British with Tallboy "earthquake bombs" on July 31, collapsing both ends of the tunnel. The Saint-Leu-d'Esserent mushroom caves was the largest of the underground V-1 sites. It was attacked by No. 617 Squadron RAF with Tallboys on July 4.

A larger "Heavy Crossbow" bunker was built at Siracourt, between Calais and the river Somme, as a V-1 storage depot.

RAF Bomber Command attacked "Bois de Cassan" (bombed August 2–4, 1944), "Forêt de Nieppe" (bombed July 28, 29, 31, August 3,4, 5, 6, 1944 and "Trossy St. Maximin" (bombed August 3–4, 1944) (Note: Ian Bazalgette, one of the pathfinders was awarded a VC for his efforts during the attack)

== V-1 launch sequence ==
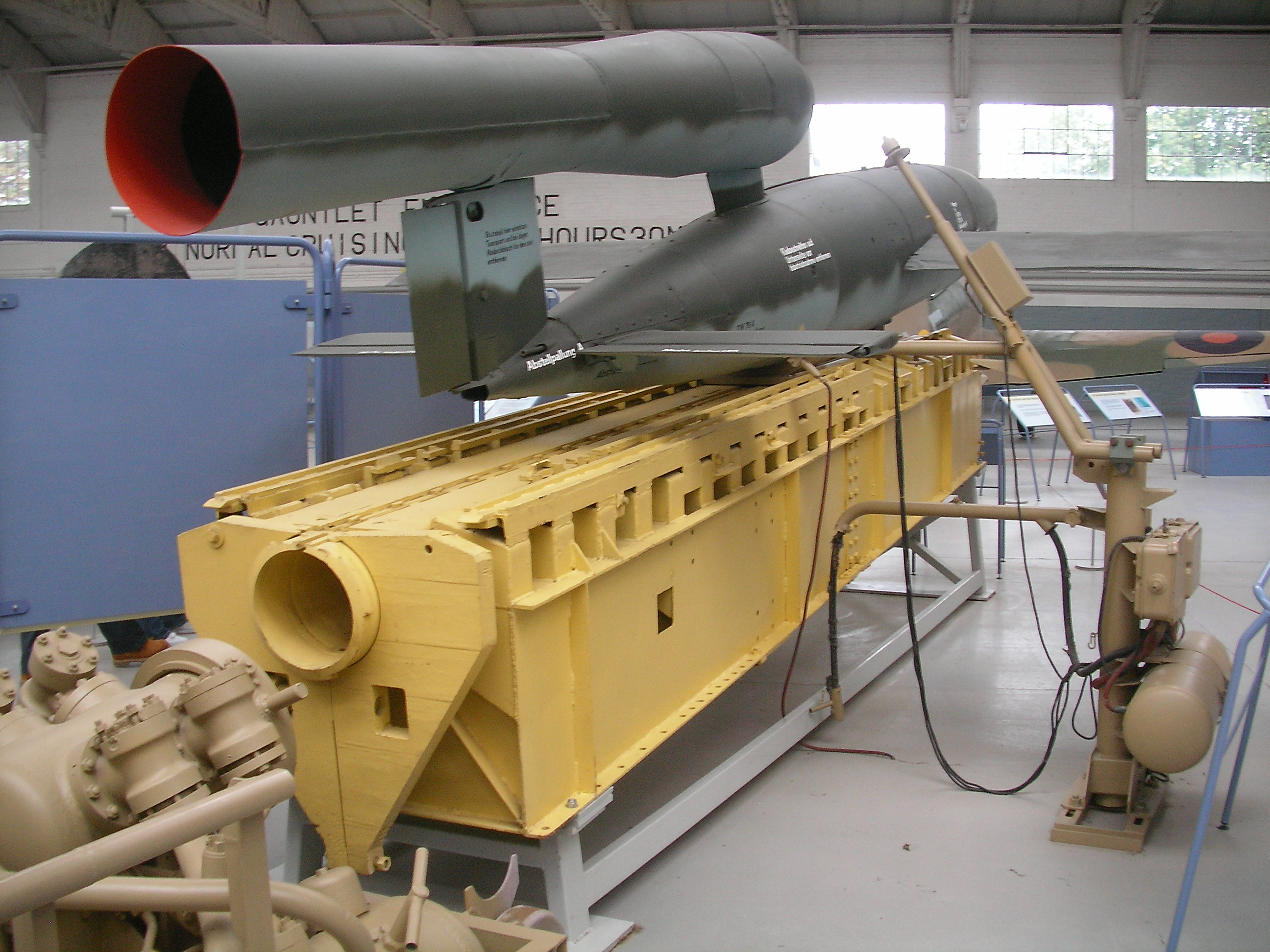
A V-1 displayed on a launch ramp section at the Imperial War Museum Duxford. To the right of the missile, the Anlaßgerät (launch device) carries electrical connections, including safe and arm connections to the missile. Part of the starter trolley, which chemically produces steam for the catapult, can also be seen.

1. Final Assembly: After moving the V-1 from the storage area, the wings were slid/bolted over/to the tubular spar.
2. Final Checkout: In the non-magnetic building, "compass swinging" was completed by hanging the V-1 and pointing it toward the target. The missile's external casing of 16-gauge sheet steel was beaten with a mallet until its magnetic field was suitably aligned. The automatic pilot was set with the flight altitude input (300–2500 metres) to the barometric (aneroid) height control and with the range set within the air log (journey computer).
3. Hoisting: The V-1 was delivered to the launching ramp via a wooden handling trolley on rails. A wooden lifting gantry on rails was connected to the V-1 lifting lug to hoist and move it onto the launching spot at the lower end of the launching ramp.
4. Fueling and Charging: Via the tank filler cap, 640 litres (140 imp gal) of petrol (German: B-Stoff) were added (later longer-range models held more). The twin spherical iron air bottles were charged with 6,200 kPa (900 psi) air to power the automatic pilot (Steuergerät). Air at 620 kPa (90 psi) powered the pneumatic servo-motors for the elevators and rudder.
5. Catapult setup: The starter trolley with the hydrogen peroxide (German: T-Stoff) and catalyst (potassium permanganate granules, Z-Stoff) was connected to provide steam to the ramp's firing tube, and the steam piston was placed into the firing tube with the piston's launching lug connected to the V-1.
6. V-1 startup: While the steam-generating trolley was being connected, the Argus As 109-014 Ofenrohr pulsejet engine was started.
7. Launch
8. Post-launch: The steam piston, having separated from the V-1 at the end of the ramp during launch, was collected for re-use (the site nominally had only two pistons). Personnel in rubber boots and protective clothing used a catwalk along the ramp and washed the launching rail with brooms.

== V-1 launching sites ==
V-1 launching sites in France were located in nine general areas – four of which had the ramps aligned toward London, and the remainder toward Brighton, Dover, Newhaven, Hastings, Southampton, Manchester, Portsmouth, Bristol, and Plymouth. The sites on the Cherbourg peninsula targeting Bristol and Plymouth were captured before being used, and eventually launching ramps were moved to Holland to target Antwerp (first launched on 3 March 1945 from Delft).

Initially the V-1 launching sites had storage buildings that were curved at the end to protect the contents against damage from air attacks. On aerial reconnaissance pictures these storage from above looked like snow skis ("ski sites"). An October 28, 1943 intelligence report regarding construction at Bois Carré near Yvrench prompted No. 170 Squadron RAF reconnaissance sortie E/463 on November 3 which detected "ski-shaped buildings 240-270 feet long." By November 1943, 72 of the ski sites had been located by Allied reconnaissance, and Operation Crossbow began bombing the original ski sites on December 5, 1943. Nazi Germany subsequently began constructing modified V-1 launch sites with limited structures that could be completed quickly, as necessary. This also allowed the modified sites to be quickly repaired after bombing. The limited work necessary to complete a modified site before launching allowed the Allied photographic interpreters to predict on June 11, 1944, that the V-1 attacks would begin within 48 hours, and the first attacks began on June 13.

== Allied attacks ==
Notable bombings of V-1 facilities during World War II
Site	"Noball" number	Bombing date	Notes
Abbeville/Amiens		December 22, 1943	51 aircraft attacked 2 flying-bomb sites between Abbeville and Amiens. One was destroyed, but the other was not located.
Abbeville/Amiens		August 28, 1944	The Amiens ("Wemars/Cappel") site was attacked.
Abbeville (Flixecourt)		December 16/17, 1943	9 Avro Lancasters of No. 617 Squadron RAF (The Dambusters) attacked the "Abbeville site in a wood at Flixecourt" and dropped their 12,000 lb Tallboy bombs accurately on the markers placed by a Oboe-equipped Mosquito. The markers were 350 yards from the target and none of the bombs were within 100 yards of the markers. No aircraft lost.
Abbeville (Tilley-le-Haut)		December 16/17, 1943	26 Short Stirlings attacked the "Tilley-le-Haut site near Abbeville" but failed because the Pathfinder markers of the Oboe-equipped de Havilland Mosquito were no closer than 450 yards from the small target. No aircraft lost.
Abbeville (Gorenflos)		December 23, 1943	Near Abbeville, the 401 BG bombed the Gorenflos Noball target.
Ailly-le-Haut-Clocher	27	December 22/23, 1943	The flying bomb site at Ailly was attacked without loss.
Ailly-le-Haut-Clocher	27	January 14, 1944	
Abbeville (Gorenflos)		March 18, 1944	
Abbeville (Gorenflos)		April 9, 1944	
Abbeville (Gorenflos)		April 10, 1944	The 457 BG bombed the Gorenflos Noball site.
Abbeville (Gorenflos)		June 9, 1944	
Acquet		July 19, 1944	6 RAF Mosquitos on a diversionary raid bombed the Scholven/Buer and Wessling synthetic oil plants, railway junctions at Aulnoye and Revigny and "a flying-bomb launching site at Acquet".
Beauvais		April 24 & 25, 1944	The 397 BG bombed the Beauvoir V-1 site.
Beauvais		May 16, 1944	The Normandy V-1 storage site at Beauvais was bombed.
Beauvais		June 11, 1944	The 466 BS bombed the Beauvais V-1 storage depot.
Beauvais		June 14, 15, & 16, 1944	The Beauvais V-1 storage depot was bombed.
Belloy-Sur-Somme		July 6, 1944	The 487 BG bombed the V-weapon site.
Bois Carré near Yvrench		February 10, 1944	The 387 BG bombed the "Yorench-Bois Carre [sic] V-1 site"
Bonneton le Faubourg ski site		December 22/23, 1943	82 aircraft attacked flying bomb sites at Ailly, Bonneton and Bristillerie without loss.
Bonneton le Faubourg ski site		January 14/15, 1944	
Bristillerie		December 22/23, 1943	82 aircraft attacked flying bomb sites at Ailly, Bonneton and Bristillerie without loss.
Bristillerie		January 4/5, 1944	
Bristillerie		January 14/15, 1944	
Bouillancourt		April 13, 1944	"Bouillancourt, near le Tréport", was attacked by No. 602 Squadron RAF and No. 132 Squadron RAF.
Brécourt		November 11, 1943	The 387th Bombardment Group records indicate Operation Crossbow bombing in Manche of a "Martinvast V-1 site" on 11 November 1943, which may have been Brécourt or Couville.
Creil		July 2, 1944	The Creil storage depot was bombed.
Bois de la Justice	74	February 28, 1944	447 BG
Bois de la Justice	74	March 13, 1944	447 BG
Drionville	50	December 24, 1943	447 BG
Grand Parc	107	January 14, 1944	447 BG
Grand Parc	107	January 21, 1944	447 BG
Herbouville		January 27/28, 1944	
Herbouville		January 29/30, 1944	22 Mosquitos attacked the Herbouville flying-bomb site and Duisburg.
La Briqueterie & Val-des-Joncs		August 2, 1944	The 487 BG bombed the V-weapon sites.
Laloge Au Pain		July 8, 1944	The 487 BG bombed the V-weapon site.
Ligercourt [sic]		April 16, 1944	The "heavily-defended ramp and bunkers at Ligercourt" were bombed in the "forest of Crécy near Abbeville."
Ligescourt		December 5, 1943	B-26s of the Ninth Air Force attacked three V-1 ski sites near Ligescourt-Bois de St. Saulve, the first No-Ball mission.
Lottinghen		March 13, 1944	Ninth Air Force: 40 B-26s attacked a "V-weapon site at Lottinghen/Les Grands Bois", France; 37 abort due to bad weather.
Maisoncelle		June 1, 1944	
Oisemont Neuville-au-Bois		June 20, 1944	
Oisemont		June 21, 1944	
Oisemont		June 23, 1944	
Oisemont		June 30, 1944	
Oisemont		July 1, 1944	
Söttevast		February 29/March 1, 1944	1 Mosquito to a "flying-bomb site at Sottevaast [sic]"
Söttevast		March 3/4, 1944	2 Mosquitos to the "Sottevaast [sic] flying-bomb site"
Söttevast		May 5, 1944	
Saint-Martin-l'Hortier		June 17, 1944	
Saint-Martin-l'Hortier		June 21, 1944	
Saint-Martin-l'Hortier		July 1, 1944	
