= V-1 complex of Saint-Leu-d'Esserent =

World War II Nazi flying bomb depot in France

- FeldMuLag 1106 Leopold
- Part of German V-1 flying bomb logistics network (Feldmulag)
- Saint-Leu-d'Esserent, Oise, France in France
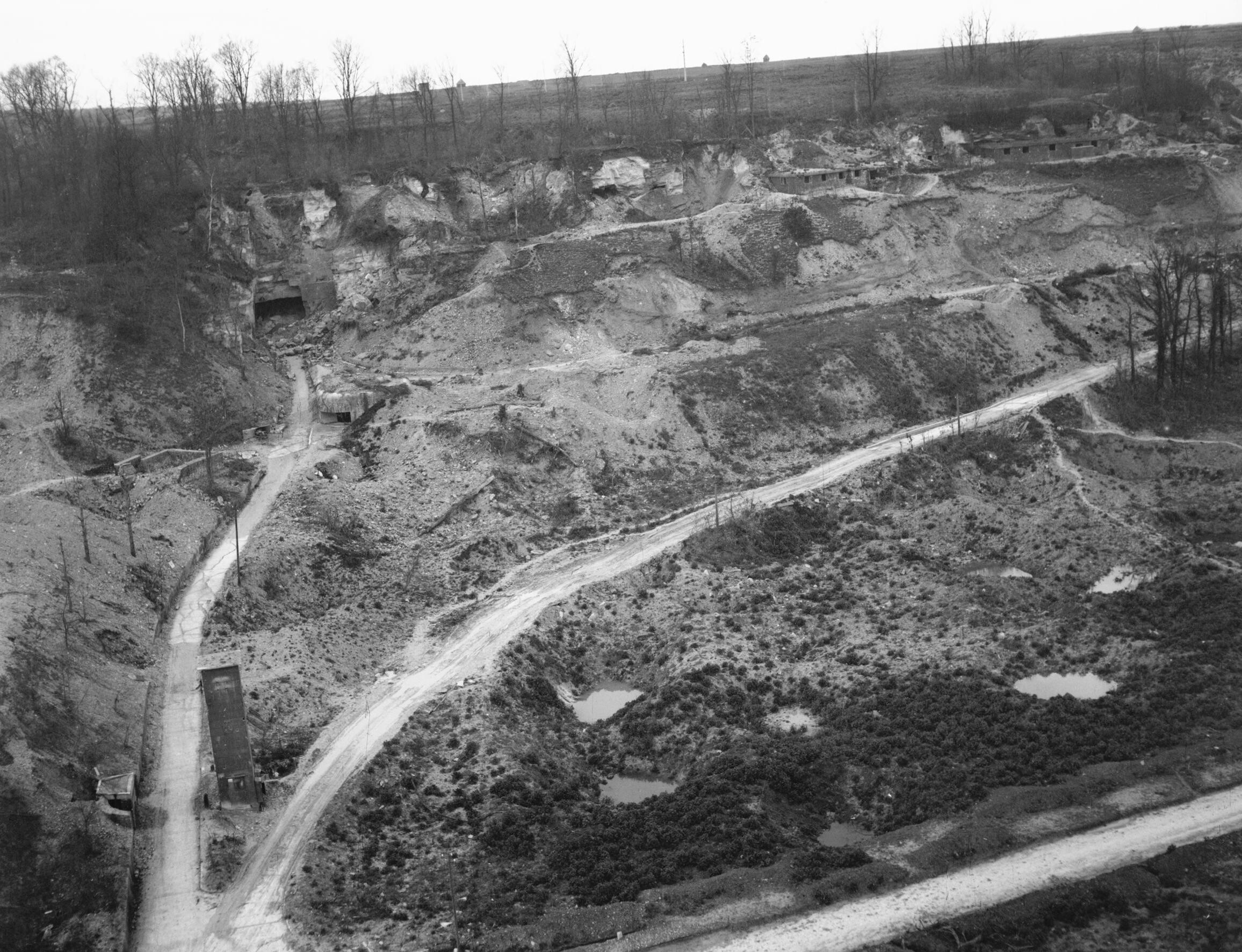
- Wartime aerial view of Saint-Leu-d'Esserent

Site information
- Type: Underground V-1 flying bomb storage and assembly depot
- Open to the public: Partially (restricted)
- Condition: Partially preserved underground; surface extensively damaged in 1944

Location
- Location in France
- Coordinates: 49°14′N 2°26′E

Site history
- Built: 19th century (quarries)
- Built by: French quarry operators; later adapted by Brissonneau et Lotz and Nazi Germany
- In use: 1939–1944
- Battles/wars: Operation Crossbow

Garrison information
- Garrison: Luftwaffe logistical and technical units (1943–1944)

The V-1 complex of Saint-Leu-d'Esserent is a complex of underground stone quarries in Saint-Leu-d'Esserent, a commune of the Oise department in northern France, which was used during the Second World War as one of Nazi Germany's largest depots for the storage, assembly and rail distribution of the V-1 flying bomb. Originally extensive limestone quarries, the galleries were progressively adapted for industrial and then military use. By mid-1944, the site had become a key V-1 logistical node in France and was subjected to repeated Allied bombing as part of Operation Crossbow, causing the destruction of much of the nearby town.

== Background ==
The town of Saint-Leu-d'Esserent is situated on the right bank of the river Oise, a few kilometres south of Creil and near Chantilly. Its underground stone quarries have been exploited since the medieval period. In the 19th century, quarrying was a major activity and represented the commune's third-largest source of employment, and the limestone, known as pierre de Saint-Leu, was valued for its quality and was used in the construction of the Château de Versailles and several other Parisian buildings. At the end of the 19th century, when the easily accessible stone was exhausted, many galleries were converted into mushroom farms (champignonnières), a common use of disused quarries in the region.

Owing to its location close to a navigable river, a main road and a railway line with a classification yard, the quarry area acquired a strategic importance on the eve of the Second World War. Its extensive network of quarries offered large, concealed underground spaces which would later be used for both French and German military purposes. From August 1939, 75 mm anti-aircraft guns were installed by the French army to protect the town and its industrial facilities. In October 1939, fearing German air raids, Brissonneau et Lotz transferred part of its production of fuselages for the Lioré et Olivier LeO 45 bomber into the large underground Carrière du Couvent at Saint-Leu-d'Esserent from Creil-Montataire. Approximately 3,000 m^{2} of galleries were equipped with production lines, electrical lighting, ventilation, heating, canteens, dormitories and other facilities for roughly 1,100 workers.

During the campaign of May–June 1940, the town was bombed by the Luftwaffe on 18 May, 21 May and 1 June. The anti-aircraft units withdrew on 8 June during the retreat of the 10th French Army, and Saint-Leu-d'Esserent fell to German forces shortly afterwards. By August 1940, the Luftwaffe had taken over the complex of underground quarries and initially used the galleries for ammunition storage for units based at nearby Creil, beginning in December 1941.

== Design and construction ==
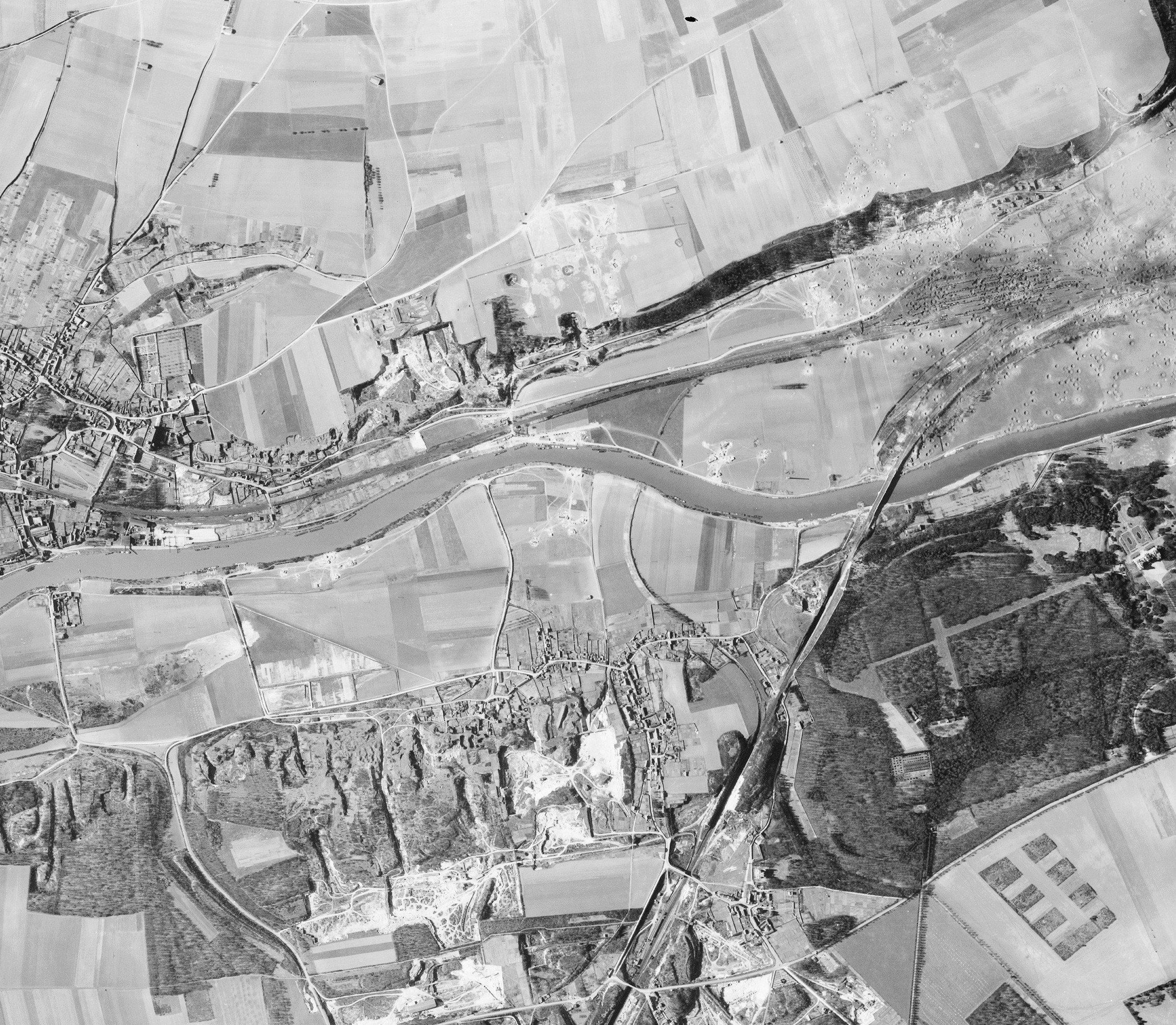
Wartime aerial view of the V-1 complex of Saint-Leu-d'Esserent (1944)

Late in 1942, the Luftwaffe decided to establish, under cover of the quarries, an installation protected from Allied bombing for the assembly of sub-assemblies supplied from Germany and the storage of V-1 flying bombs. The thickness of the limestone roof, up to around 30 m in places, provided a natural protection from aerial reconnaissance and bombing, while its connection to regional rail networks made it ideal for large-scale storage and distribution. These underground installations were used to organize the transport of the V-1 bombs by train to the launching pads in northern France and to store fuel, launch equipment and chemicals needed for firing the missiles. The thickness of the limestone roof, up to around 30 m in places, provided a natural protection against conventional bombing.

The German high command gave the V-1 complex of Saint-Leu-d'Esserent the code name "Leopold" (also referred to as FeldMuLag 1106 Leopold). The complex formed part of a network of twelve V-1 storage depots in France known as FeldMuLag (German: Feldmunitionslager, lit. 'Field ammunition depots'). From early 1943, Organisation Todt was tasked with upgrading the underground complex for V-1 storage and assembly. Anti-aircraft batteries, bunkers, fuel and ammunition depots were installed to defend the site, while inside the quarry further galleries were concreted and new access roads built. Concealed railway spurs feeding directly into the hillside were built, and the entrances were reworked to improve concealment and protection. Several thousand square metres of additional tunnels were concreted, forming hundreds of storage and work bays over an underground area of several hectares. Power generators, an improved ventilation system, communications facilities, specialized workshops, offices, barracks, infirmaries and kitchens were installed to support the workforce. French workers were employed for the initial phase of construction, and Russian prisoners of war were later used extensively.

In early 1944, the first trains transporting V-1s arrived from the production facilities around Nordhausen in Germany. On 1 June 1944, it dispatched its first flying bombs to the launch sites. The Saint-Leu-d'Esserent complex soon became a vital hub for rail transport of V-1s between Mittelwerk and the various storage and launch sites in northern France. The explosive charge of the V-1 warhead was inserted before the missiles were dispatched to the launch sites, and its location near the Pontoise–Creil railway line made it well suited for supplying the V-1 launch bases in the Pas-de-Calais region. The V-1 complex Saint-Leu-d’Esserent provided about 70 percent of the V-1s that were launched during November 1944.

On 11 August 1944, German forces evacuated the V-1 complex of Saint-Leu-d'Esserent after destroying part of the remaining V-1 stocks. Saint-Leu-d'Esserent was liberated by American troops on 31 August 1944. Allied engineers examined missiles that had not been destroyed. After the war, the quarry complex returned to civilian uses.

== Air raids on the V1 complex of Saint-Leu-d'Esserent ==
Because of its role in the V-1 programme, the Saint-Leu-d'Esserent complex and the surrounding town were heavily bombed as part of Operation Crossbow, the Allied bombing campaign against German V-weapon facilities. Intelligence about the construction and purpose of the underground installation was provided to the Allies by French resistance networks such as Valmy, Marco Polo and Octave. Along with Nucourt (49°9′56.46″N 1°51′1.42″E) to the west, the V-1 complex Saint-Leu-d’Esserent was identified by Allied intelligence in June 1944 as one of the three principal underground V-1 storage depots.

Between 17 March and 31 August 1944, the town and its surroundings were the target of numerous bombings by the 8th and 9th US Army Air Forces and the British Royal Air Force, with sources indicating about eighteen separate attacks. The targets included the classification yard, the Creil–Pontoise railway, the river port installations, bridges, anti-aircraft batteries and the quarry entrances sheltering the V-1s. On 27 June 1944, the US Army Air Force attacked the Saint-Leu-d'Esserent area for the first time, in a raid intended to disrupt the rail infrastructure and surface installations associated with the complex. On 29 June 1944, the Leopold complex was formally designated a priority target for RAF Bomber Command, alongside Nucourt (FeldMuLag 1111 Nordpol) and Rilly-la-Montagne (FeldMuLag 1116 Richard).

The first major RAF attack took place on the evening of 4 July 1944, when 17 Lancasters, a Mosquito and a Mustang of 617 Squadron ("Dambusters") dropped eleven Tallboy earthquake bombs on the quarry area, but the galleries withstood the attack. This was followed the same night (4–5 July) by a much larger raid in which 231 Lancasters and 15 Mosquitos of No. 5 Group RAF dropped about 1,157 tonnes of high-explosive and 5 tonnes of incendiary bombs in three waves. The RAF regarded the bombing as accurate, but a German report intercepted by the British on 5 July indicated that although the access road and railway line had been destroyed, the quarry entrance itself had not been hit and could be made operational again within about 24 hours. German losses at the complex were reported as five missing men, with further casualties among the flak crews. Thirteen Lancasters failed to return from this mission, with 77 airmen killed. A third major raid took place during the night of 7–8 July 1944, when 208 Lancasters and 13 Mosquitos of No. 5 Group attacked, dropping about 1,121 tonnes of high explosives and 4 tonnes of incendiaries in three waves. Thirty-two aircraft were lost, with heavy casualties among their crews. On the ground, this was the deadliest raid for the inhabitants of Saint-Leu-d’Esserent, causing ten civilian deaths. This raid, combined with the earlier attacks, succeeded in blocking several of the tunnel entrances and reducing the effectiveness of the complex. The final large raid on Saint-Leu-d'Esserent itself took place on the afternoon of 5 August 1944, when an initial force of 456 RAF aircraft (of which about 441 took part) dropped roughly 2,193 tonnes of bombs in two main waves against the complex and transport infrastructure. This was the heaviest bombing raid ever carried out in the Oise department and also caused extensive damage in surrounding communes such as Précy-sur-Oise, Gouvieux, Lamorlaye and Creil.

In total, Saint-Leu-d'Esserent was attacked at least 18 times between 17 March and 28 August 1944. The most destructive raids took place on the night of 7–8 July and on 5 August 1944. The tonnage of bombs dropped on Saint-Leu-d’Esserent and the immediate area in July and August 1944 has been estimated at 9,000 tonnes. RAF Bomber Command losses in the raids on Saint-Leu-d’Esserent and nearby Saint-Maximin in the summer of 1944 amounted to 54 bombers destroyed, with 264 aircrew killed, 45 taken prisoner and 62 evaders recovered in the Oise and surrounding departments.

Other raids in July and August 1944 targeted associated sites in the local V-1 logistical network. On 12 July 1944, 168 Halifax, 46 Lancasters and 8 Mosquitos attacked the quarries at Thiverny, where another V-1 storage dump was located. Subsequent attacks on 2, 3 and 4 August 1944 were directed mainly at the V-1 storage and launch installations in the quarries of Trossy-Saint-Maximin, causing very severe damage to that town.

By the liberation in September 1944, Saint-Leu-d'Esserent was described as a "ghost town": about 85 percent of the commune was heavily damaged, with roughly 45 percent totally destroyed. In total, 31 civilians, including 16 inhabitants of Saint-Leu-d'Esserent, were killed in the various 1944 bombings of the town, with additional deaths in neighboring communes when the complex was targeted. On 11 November 1948, the commune of Saint-Leu-d'Esserent was awarded the Croix de Guerre 1939–1945 with citation in recognition of the scale of the destruction and the endurance of its population.

== See also ==
- V-1 flying bomb (facilities)
- Siracourt V-1 bunker
