= Villers-sous-Saint-Leu =

- Commune
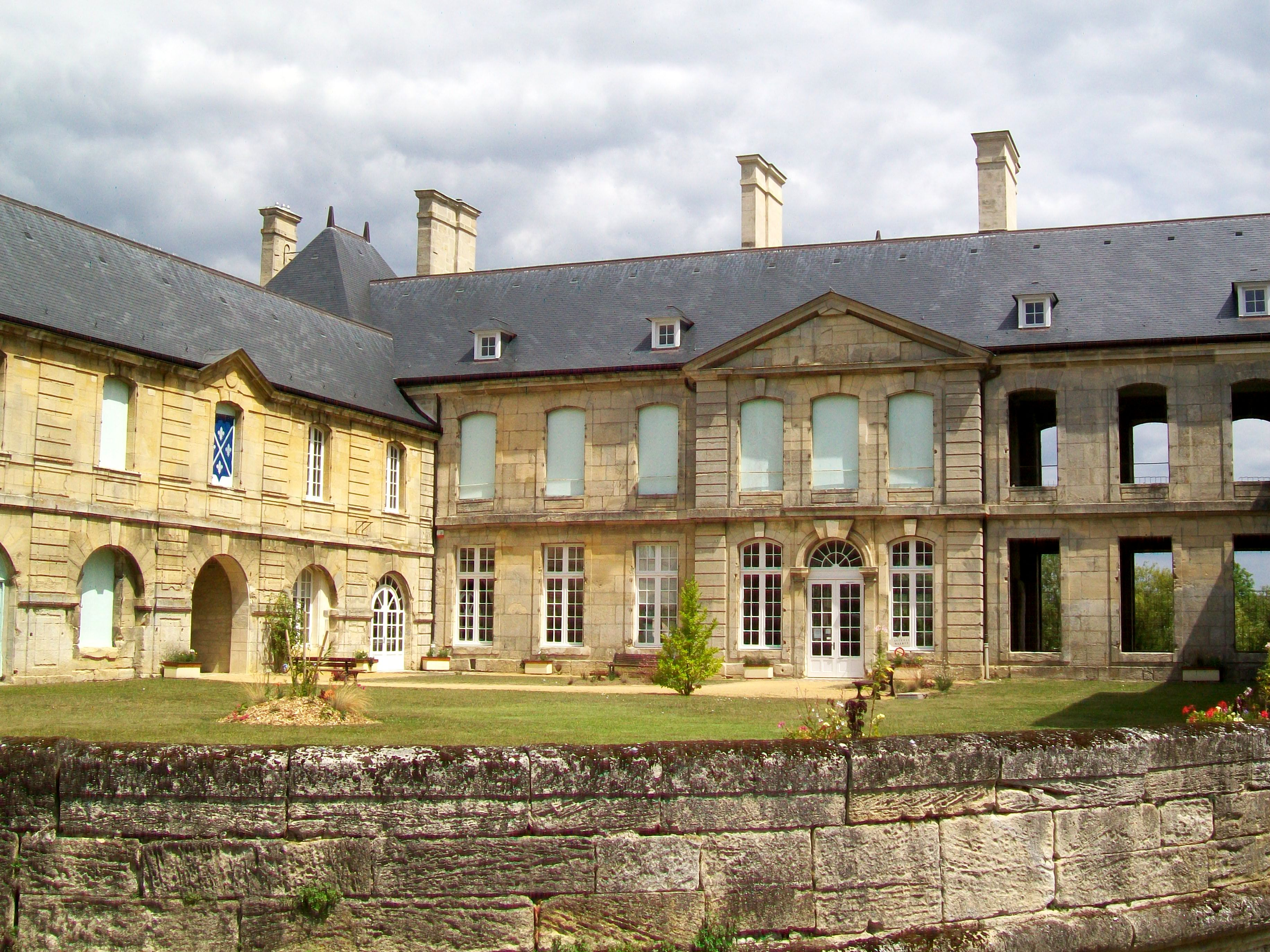
- The town hall in Villers-sous-Saint-Leu

- Coat of arms
- Location of Villers-sous-Saint-Leu
- Location within France Location within Hauts-de-France
- Coordinates: 49°12′48″N 2°23′55″E
- Country: France
- Region: Hauts-de-France
- Department: Oise
- Arrondissement: Senlis
- Canton: Montataire

Government
  - Mayor (2020–2026): Guy Laforest
- Area^{1}: 4.37 km^{2} (1.69 sq mi)
- Elevation: 45 m (148 ft)
- Highest elevation: 123 m (404 ft)
- Lowest elevation: 26 m (85 ft)
- Population (2023): 2,284
  - Density: 523/km^{2} (1,350/sq mi)
- Time zone: UTC+01:00 (CET)
  - Summer (DST): UTC+02:00 (CEST)
- INSEE/Postal code: 60686 /60340
- ^{1} French Land Register data, which excludes lakes, ponds, glaciers > 1 km^{2} (0.386 sq mi or 247 acres) and river estuaries.

Villers-sous-Saint-Leu (French pronunciation: [vilɛʁ su sɛ̃ lø], literally Villers under Saint-Leu) is a commune in the Oise department in northern France.

== Population ==
Historical population
Year	Pop.	±% p.a.
1968	770	—
1975	1,356	+8.42%
1982	1,857	+4.59%
1990	2,347	+2.97%
1999	2,083	−1.32%
2007	2,122	+0.23%
2012	2,337	+1.95%
2017	2,335	−0.02%
2023	2,284	−0.37%
Source: INSEE

== See also ==
- Communes of the Oise department
