= Saint-Vaast =

Saint Vaast or Saint-Vaast may refer to:

- Vedast, (died c. 540), Frankish bishop
- Abbey of St. Vaast, a former Benedictine monastery

== Belgium ==
- Saint-Vaast, a commune, merged into La Louvière

== France ==
- Airon-Saint-Vaast, in the Calvados department
- Aubin-Saint-Vaast, in the Pas-de-Calais department
- Biache-Saint-Vaast, in the Pas-de-Calais department
- Neuville-Saint-Vaast, in the Pas-de-Calais department
- Saint-Vaast-en-Auge, in the Pas-de-Calais department
- Saint-Vaast-en-Cambrésis, in the Nord department
- Saint-Vaast-en-Chaussée, in the Somme department
- Saint-Vaast-Dieppedalle, in the Seine-Maritime department
- Saint-Vaast-d'Équiqueville, in the Seine-Maritime department
- Saint-Vaast-la-Hougue, in the Manche department
- Saint-Vaast-de-Longmont, in the Oise department
- Saint-Vaast-lès-Mello, in the Oise department
- Saint-Vaast-sur-Seulles, in the Calvados department
- Saint-Vaast-du-Val, in the Seine-Maritime department

== See also ==
- Saint-Waast (aka. Saint-Waast-la Vallée), in the Nord department
- Monceau-Saint-Waast, in the Nord department
- Arras Cathedral (Cathédrale Notre-Dame-et-Saint-Vaast d'Arras)
