= Blaincourt-lès-Précy =

- Commune
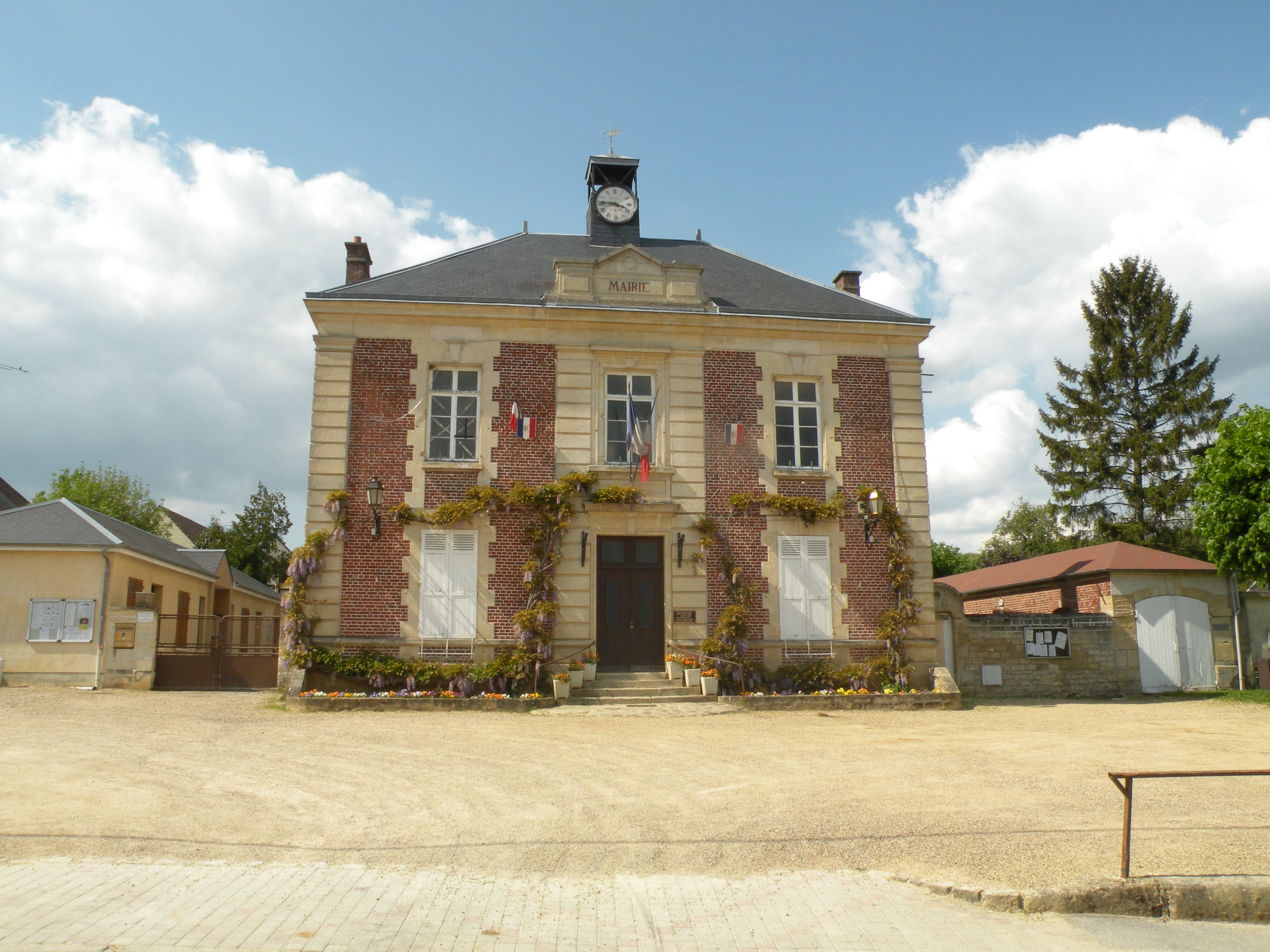
- The town hall in Blaincourt-lès-Précy
- Location of Blaincourt-lès-Précy
- Location within France Location within Hauts-de-France
- Coordinates: 49°13′25″N 2°21′26″E
- Country: France
- Region: Hauts-de-France
- Department: Oise
- Arrondissement: Senlis
- Canton: Montataire

Government
  - Mayor (2023–2026): Mickaël Dequin
- Area^{1}: 8.13 km^{2} (3.14 sq mi)
- Elevation: 100 m (330 ft)
- Highest elevation: 150 m (490 ft)
- Lowest elevation: 46 m (151 ft)
- Population (2023): 1,189
  - Density: 146/km^{2} (379/sq mi)
- Time zone: UTC+01:00 (CET)
  - Summer (DST): UTC+02:00 (CEST)
- INSEE/Postal code: 60074 /60460
- ^{1} French Land Register data, which excludes lakes, ponds, glaciers > 1 km^{2} (0.386 sq mi or 247 acres) and river estuaries.

Blaincourt-lès-Précy (French pronunciation: [blɛ̃kuʁ lɛ pʁesi], literally Blaincourt near Précy, before 1992: Blaincourt) is a commune in the Oise department in northern France.

== Population ==
Historical population
Year	Pop.	±% p.a.
1968	438	—
1975	522	+2.54%
1982	889	+7.90%
1990	1,253	+4.38%
1999	1,158	−0.87%
2007	1,217	+0.62%
2012	1,195	−0.36%
2017	1,190	−0.08%
2023	1,189	−0.01%
Source: INSEE

== See also ==
- Communes of the Oise department
