= Cramoisy station =

Railway station in Cramoisy, France

Cramoisy
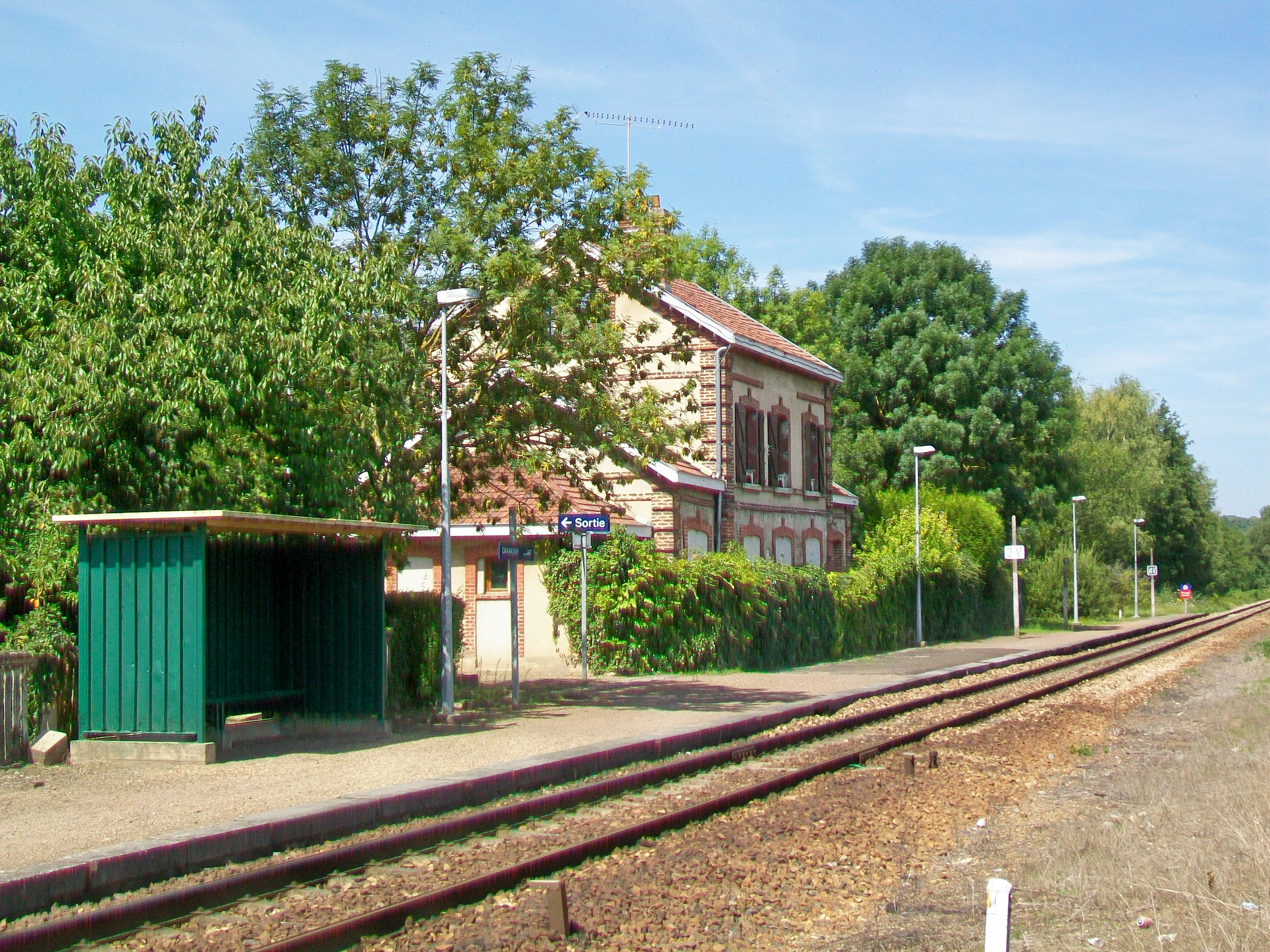

General information
- Location: Cramoisy
- Coordinates: 49°15′23″N 2°24′20″E
- Owner: RFF/SNCF
- Line: Creil–Beauvais railway

Other information
- Station code: 87313544

Services
Preceding station	TER Hauts-de-France	Following station
Cires-lès-Mello towards Beauvais	Proxi P32	Montataire towards Creil
Location

Cramoisy is a railway station located in the commune of Cramoisy in the Oise department, France. The station is served by TER Hauts-de-France trains (Beauvais - Creil line, line P32).

== See also ==
- List of SNCF stations in Hauts-de-France
