= Château de Montataire =

Coordinates: 49.2563°N 2.4429°E

- Montataire, Oise, France

Site information
- Type: Castle

Location

Site history
- Built: 12th century CE

The Château de Montataire is a 12th-century castle in the commune of Montataire in the Oise département of France.

The castle was constructed in the 12th century by Count Renaud II de Clermont (c. 1074 – c. 1154). It comprises a right-angled corps de logis flanked by four round towers of different diameters. The building was subject to several alterations up to the 19th century. The grounds now contain several buildings but are not accessible to the public.

== See also ==
- List of castles in France
