= Canton of Montataire =

Canton of France

Coordinates: 49.26°N 2.43°E

- Canton
- Situation of the canton of Montataire in the department of Oise
- Country: France
- Region: Hauts-de-France
- Department: Oise
- No. of communes: {{{nbcomm}}}
- Population (2023): 37,356
- INSEE code: 6013

The canton of Montataire is an administrative division of the Oise department, northern France. Its borders were modified at the French canton reorganisation which came into effect in March 2015. Its seat is in Montataire.

It consists of the following communes:

1. Balagny-sur-Thérain
2. Blaincourt-lès-Précy
3. Cires-lès-Mello
4. Cramoisy
5. Foulangues
6. Maysel
7. Mello
8. Montataire
9. Précy-sur-Oise
10. Rousseloy
11. Saint-Leu-d'Esserent
12. Saint-Vaast-lès-Mello
13. Thiverny
14. Ully-Saint-Georges
15. Villers-sous-Saint-Leu
