= Montataire station =

Railway station in Montataire, France

Montataire
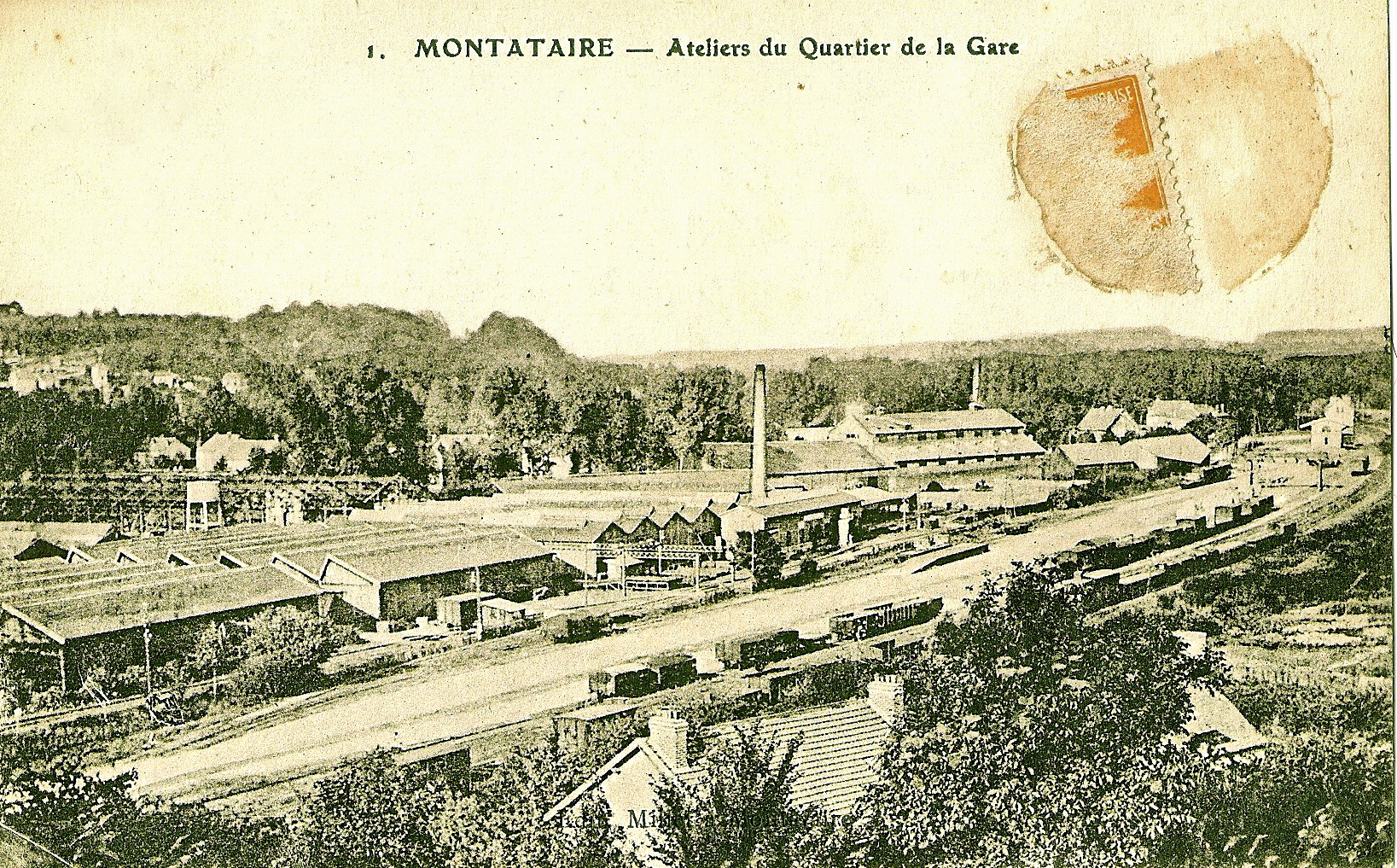
- The area around the station in the 1920s

General information
- Location: Montataire, Oise, Hauts-de-France; France
- Coordinates: 49.2511°N 2.4360°E
- Line: Creil–Beauvais railway

Other information
- Station code: 87276618

Services
Preceding station	TER Hauts-de-France	Following station
Cramoisy towards Beauvais	Proxi P32	Creil Terminus
Location

Montataire is a railway station located in the French municipality of Montataire, (Oise). The station is served by TER Hauts-de-France (Beauvais - Creil line).
