= Ully-Saint-Georges =

- Commune
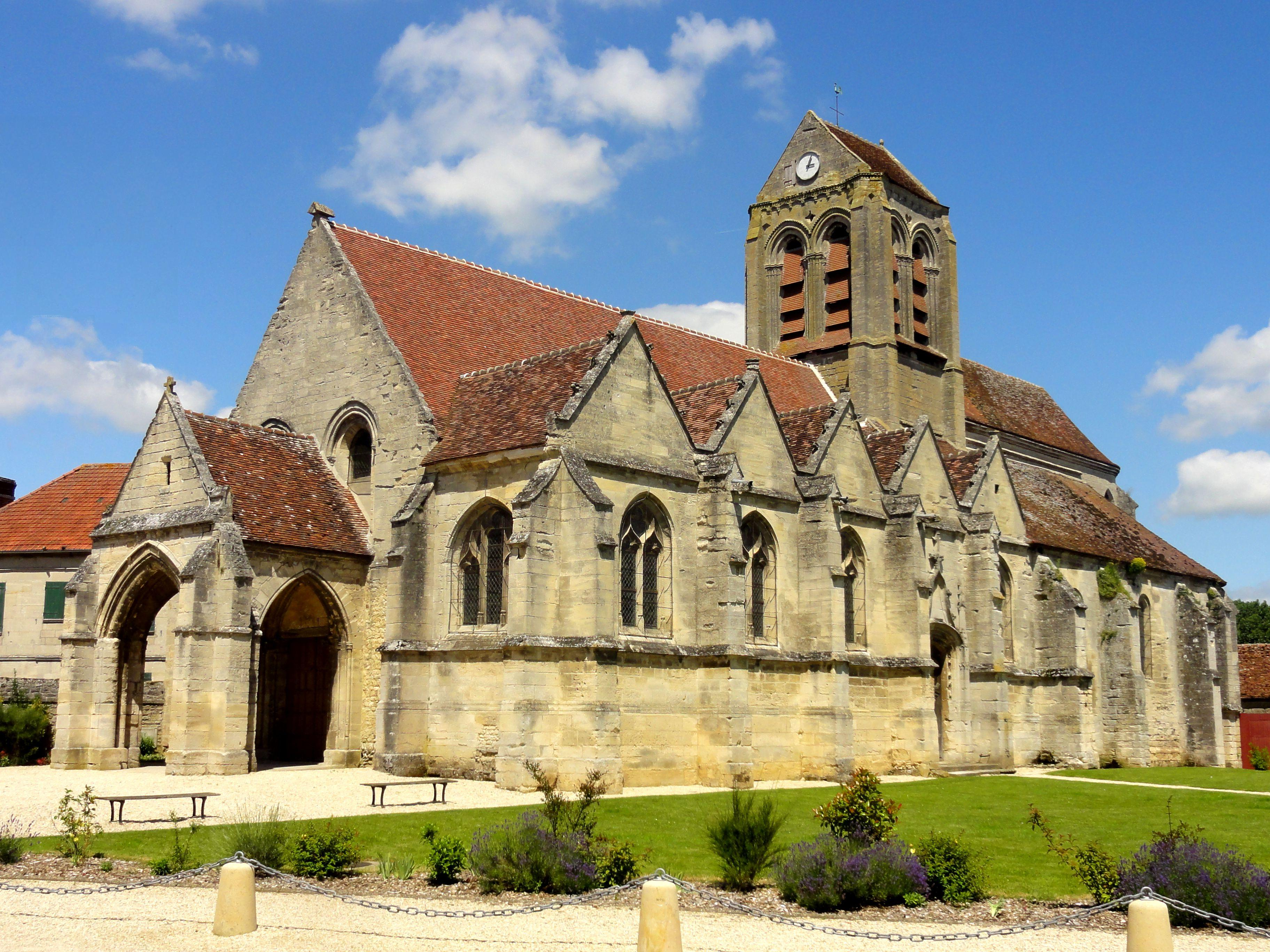
- The church in Ully-Saint-Georges
- Location of Ully-Saint-Georges
- Location within France Location within Hauts-de-France
- Coordinates: 49°16′43″N 2°16′52″E
- Country: France
- Region: Hauts-de-France
- Department: Oise
- Arrondissement: Senlis
- Canton: Montataire

Government
  - Mayor (2024–2026): Colette Dewez
- Area^{1}: 18.71 km^{2} (7.22 sq mi)
- Elevation: 52 m (171 ft)
- Highest elevation: 193 m (633 ft)
- Lowest elevation: 52 m (171 ft)
- Population (2023): 1,941
  - Density: 103.7/km^{2} (268.7/sq mi)
- Time zone: UTC+01:00 (CET)
  - Summer (DST): UTC+02:00 (CEST)
- INSEE/Postal code: 60651 /60730
- ^{1} French Land Register data, which excludes lakes, ponds, glaciers > 1 km^{2} (0.386 sq mi or 247 acres) and river estuaries.

Ully-Saint-Georges (French pronunciation: [yli sɛ̃ ʒɔʁʒ]) is a commune in the Oise department in northern France.

== See also ==
- Communes of the Oise department
