= Communauté d'agglomération Creil Sud Oise =

Federation of municipalities in France

Coordinates: 49.26081°N 2.45750°E

Creil Sud Oise
- Communauté d'agglomération
- Country: France
- Region: Hauts-de-France
- Department: Oise
- No. of communes: 11
- Established: January 1, 2017

Government
  - President: Jean-Claude Villemain (PS)
- Area: 83.49 km^{2} (32.24 sq mi)
- Population (2023): 90,234
  - Density: 1,081/km^{2} (2,799/sq mi)
- Website: creilsudoise.fr

The Communauté d'agglomération Creil Sud Oise is an agglomeration community located in the Oise department within the Hauts-de-France region of France, seated in the town Creil. The community was created on 1 January 2017, with an area of 83.5 km^{2}, and a population of 88,665 (2020), of which 35,970 live in Creil.

== Composition ==
The agglomeration community consists of the following 11 communes:

1. Creil
2. Cramoisy
3. Maysel
4. Montataire
5. Nogent-sur-Oise
6. Rousseloy
7. Saint-Leu-d'Esserent
8. Saint-Maximin
9. Saint-Vaast-lès-Mello
10. Thiverny
11. Villers-Saint-Paul

== Demography ==
Historical population
Year	Pop.	±% p.a.
1968	66,540	—
1975	76,016	+1.92%
1982	79,787	+0.69%
1990	79,030	−0.12%
1999	78,152	−0.12%
2007	81,905	+0.59%
2012	82,560	+0.16%
2017	86,512	+0.94%
2023	90,234	+0.70%
In its geography at 1 January 2025. Source: INSEE

== See also ==
- Communes of the Oise department
