= Maysel =

- Commune
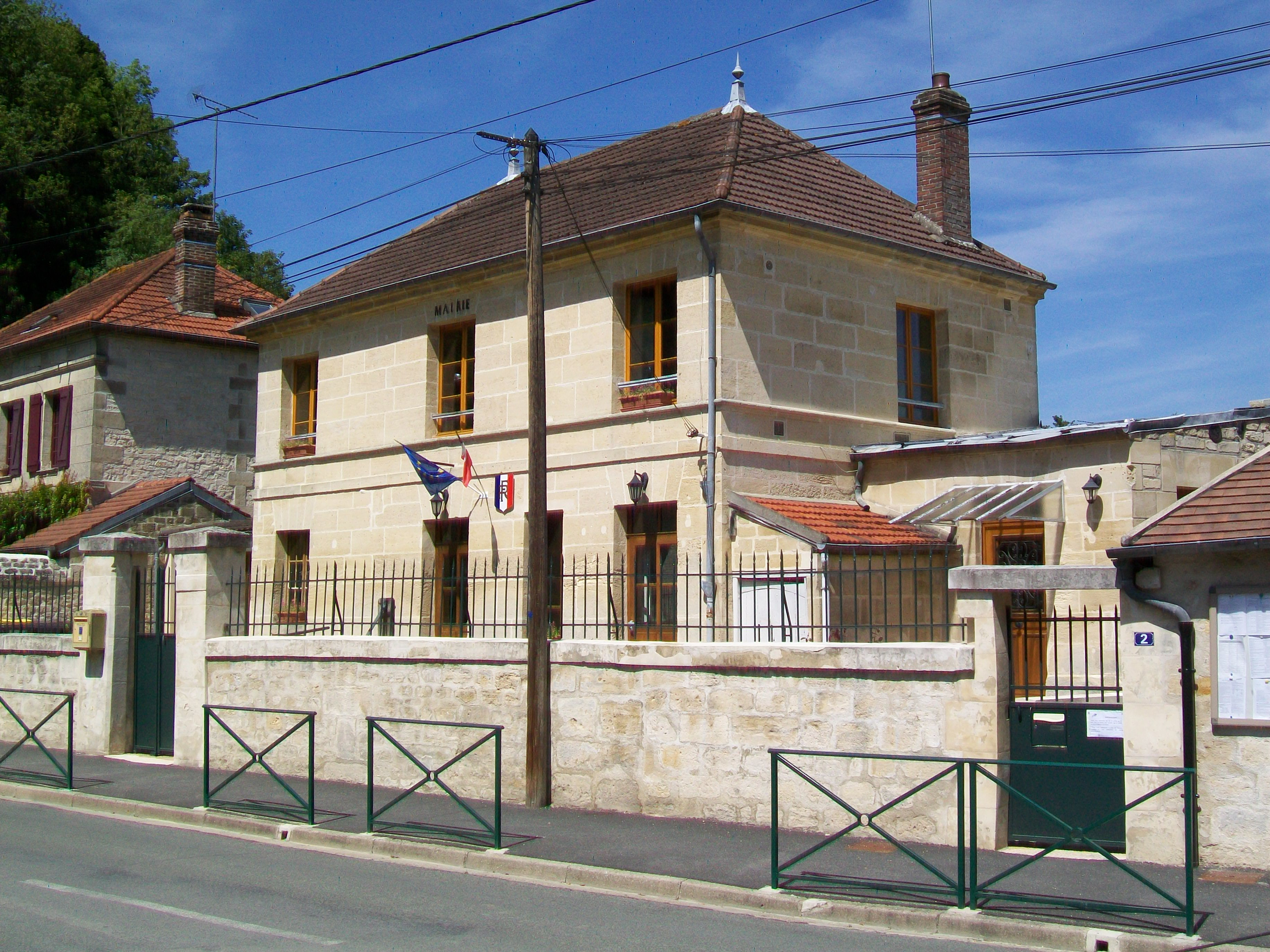
- The town hall in Maysel
- Location of Maysel
- Location within France Location within Hauts-de-France
- Coordinates: 49°15′40″N 2°22′30″E
- Country: France
- Region: Hauts-de-France
- Department: Oise
- Arrondissement: Senlis
- Canton: Montataire
- Intercommunality: CA Creil Sud Oise

Government
  - Mayor (2020–2026): Hervé Lefez
- Area^{1}: 3.71 km^{2} (1.43 sq mi)
- Elevation: 35 m (115 ft)
- Highest elevation: 142 m (466 ft)
- Lowest elevation: 32 m (105 ft)
- Population (2023): 211
  - Density: 56.9/km^{2} (147/sq mi)
- Time zone: UTC+01:00 (CET)
  - Summer (DST): UTC+02:00 (CEST)
- INSEE/Postal code: 60391 /60660
- ^{1} French Land Register data, which excludes lakes, ponds, glaciers > 1 km^{2} (0.386 sq mi or 247 acres) and river estuaries.

Maysel (French pronunciation: [mɛzɛl]) is a commune in the Oise department in northern France.

== See also ==
- Communes of the Oise department
