= Montataire =

- Commune
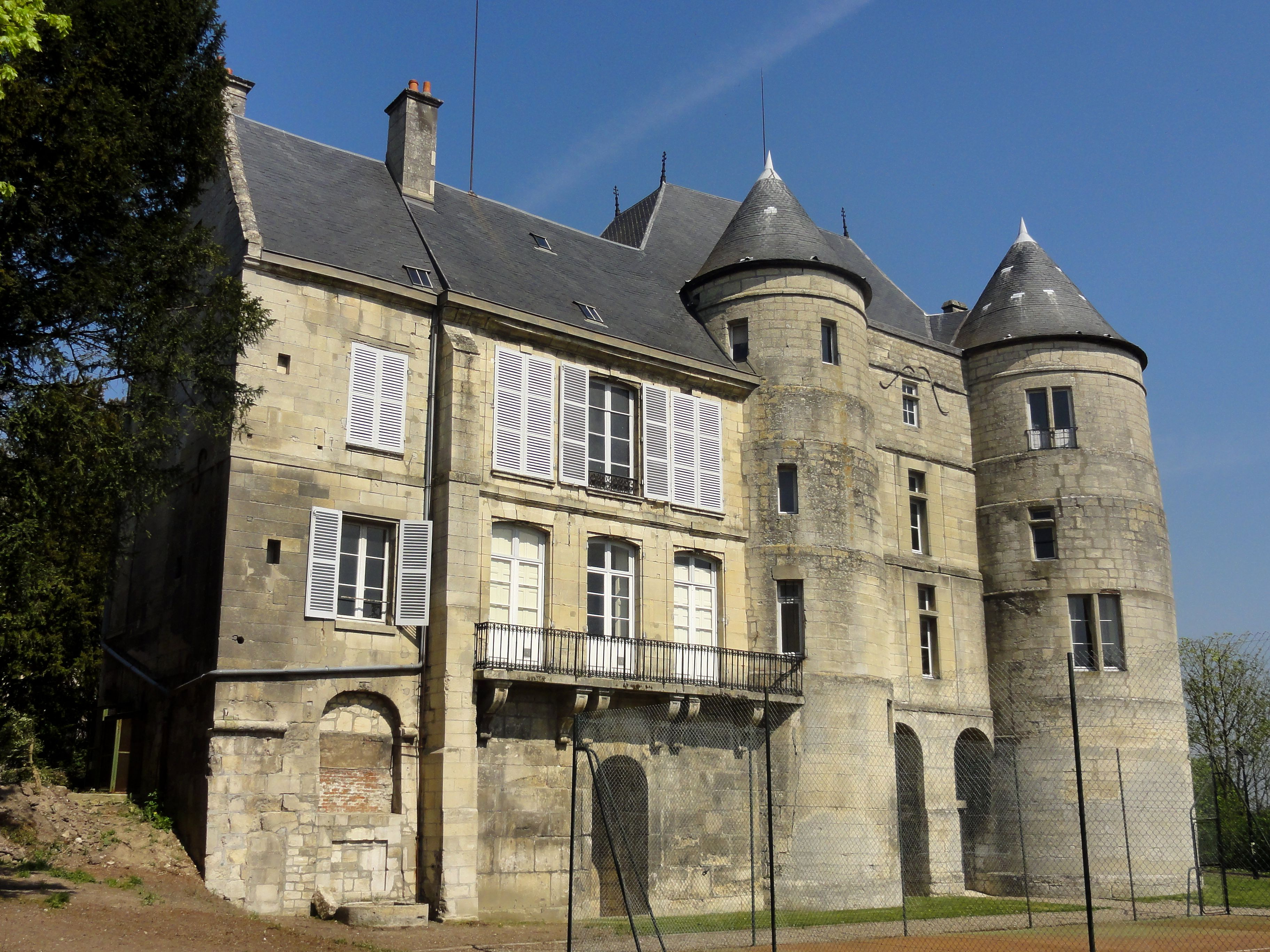
- The chateau in Montataire
- Location of Montataire
- Location within France Location within Hauts-de-France
- Coordinates: 49°15′22″N 2°26′21″E
- Country: France
- Region: Hauts-de-France
- Department: Oise
- Arrondissement: Senlis
- Canton: Montataire
- Intercommunality: CA Creil Sud Oise

Government
  - Mayor (2020–2026): Jean-Pierre Bosino
- Area^{1}: 10.66 km^{2} (4.12 sq mi)
- Elevation: 30 m (98 ft)
- Highest elevation: 110 m (360 ft)
- Lowest elevation: 26 m (85 ft)
- Population (2023): 14,257
  - Density: 1,337/km^{2} (3,464/sq mi)
- Time zone: UTC+01:00 (CET)
  - Summer (DST): UTC+02:00 (CEST)
- INSEE/Postal code: 60414 /60160
- ^{1} French Land Register data, which excludes lakes, ponds, glaciers > 1 km^{2} (0.386 sq mi or 247 acres) and river estuaries.

Montataire (French pronunciation: [mɔ̃tatɛʁ]) is a commune in the Oise department in northern France. Montataire station has rail connections to Beauvais and Creil. The journalist and historian Arthur Dinaux (1795–1864) died in Montataire.

== History ==
=== Middle ages ===
In 1095, Peter the Hermit stoppes by the city

In May 1358, the Jacquerie, a peasant revolt lasting a month, took place. It was led by Guillaume Calle, who established his headquarters in Montataire.

== Population ==
Historical population
Year	Pop.	±% p.a.
1968	10,020	—
1975	13,166	+3.98%
1982	12,855	−0.34%
1990	12,353	−0.50%
1999	12,048	−0.28%
2007	12,265	+0.22%
2012	12,626	+0.58%
2017	13,263	+0.99%
2023	14,257	+1.21%
Source: INSEE

== Sights ==
- Château de Montataire, 12th century castle.

== See also ==
- Communes of the Oise department
