= Cramoisy =

- Commune
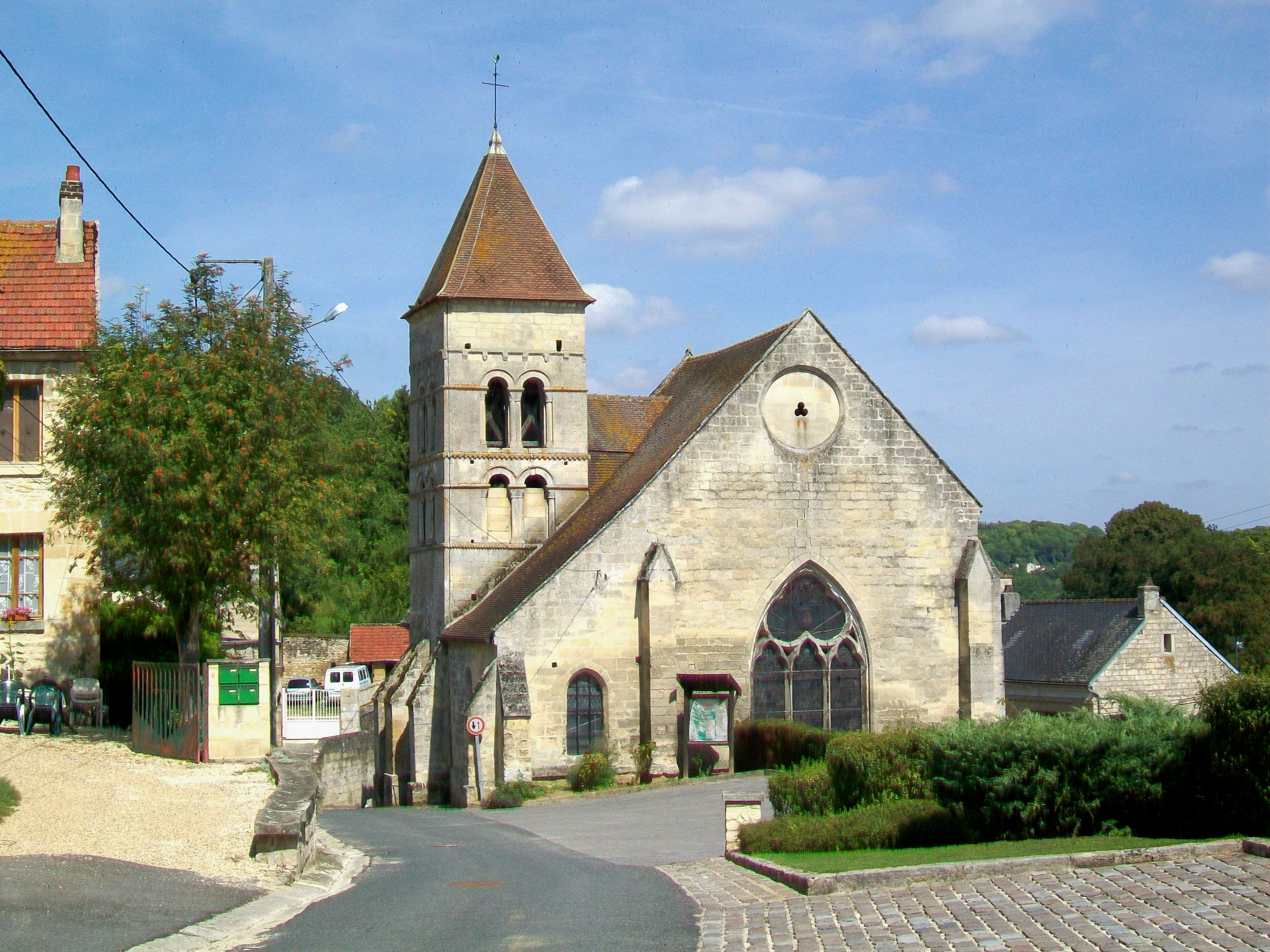
- The church in Cramoisy
- Location of Cramoisy
- Location within France Location within Hauts-de-France
- Coordinates: 49°15′21″N 2°24′08″E
- Country: France
- Region: Hauts-de-France
- Department: Oise
- Arrondissement: Senlis
- Canton: Montataire
- Intercommunality: CA Creil Sud Oise

Government
  - Mayor (2020–2026): Raymond Galliegue
- Area^{1}: 6.3 km^{2} (2.4 sq mi)
- Elevation: 33 m (108 ft)
- Highest elevation: 127 m (417 ft)
- Lowest elevation: 30 m (98 ft)
- Population (2023): 803
  - Density: 130/km^{2} (330/sq mi)
- Time zone: UTC+01:00 (CET)
  - Summer (DST): UTC+02:00 (CEST)
- INSEE/Postal code: 60173 /60660 (ex-60910)
- ^{1} French Land Register data, which excludes lakes, ponds, glaciers > 1 km^{2} (0.386 sq mi or 247 acres) and river estuaries.

Cramoisy (French pronunciation: [kʁamwazi]) is a commune in the Oise department in northern France. Cramoisy station has rail connections to Beauvais and Creil.

== See also ==
- Communes of the Oise department
