= Rousseloy =

- Commune
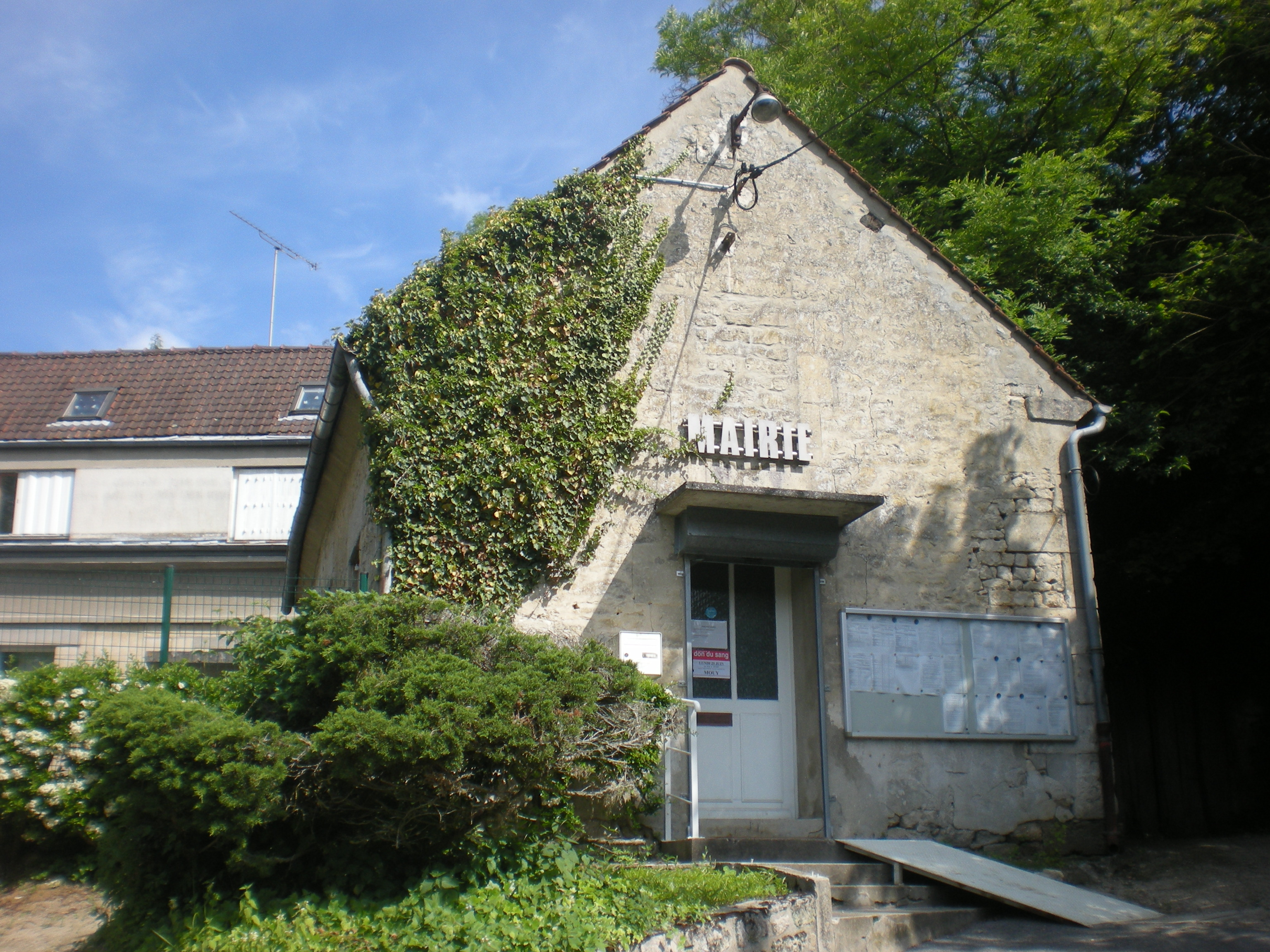
- The town hall in Rousseloy
- Location of Rousseloy
- Location within France Location within Hauts-de-France
- Coordinates: 49°17′59″N 2°23′36″E
- Country: France
- Region: Hauts-de-France
- Department: Oise
- Arrondissement: Clermont
- Canton: Montataire
- Intercommunality: CA Creil Sud Oise

Government
  - Mayor (2020–2026): Didier Rosier
- Area^{1}: 3.9 km^{2} (1.5 sq mi)
- Elevation: 110 m (360 ft)
- Highest elevation: 116 m (381 ft)
- Lowest elevation: 41 m (135 ft)
- Population (2023): 277
  - Density: 71/km^{2} (180/sq mi)
- Time zone: UTC+01:00 (CET)
  - Summer (DST): UTC+02:00 (CEST)
- INSEE/Postal code: 60551 /60660
- ^{1} French Land Register data, which excludes lakes, ponds, glaciers > 1 km^{2} (0.386 sq mi or 247 acres) and river estuaries.

Rousseloy (French pronunciation: [ʁus(ə)lwa]) is a commune in the Oise department in northern France.

== See also ==
- Communes of the Oise department
