= Saint-Leu-d'Esserent =

- Commune
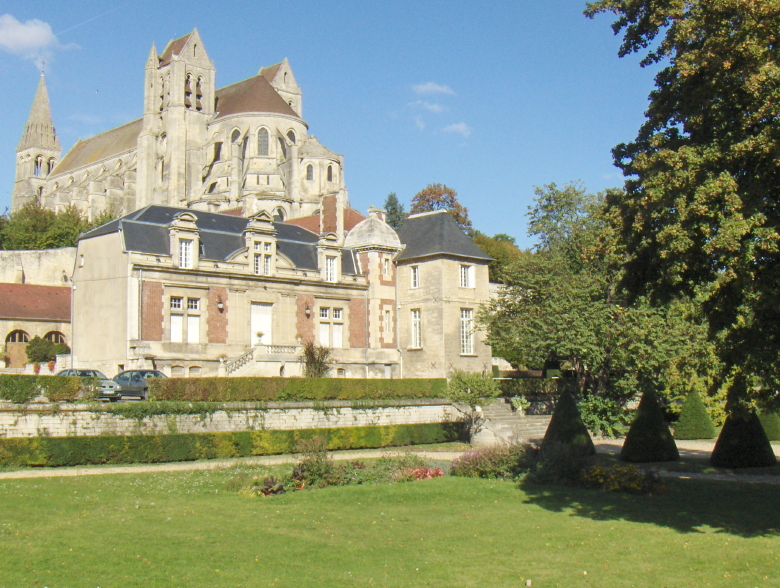
- The town hall and abbey in Saint-Leu-d'Esserent

- Coat of arms
- Location of Saint-Leu-d'Esserent
- Location within France Location within Hauts-de-France
- Coordinates: 49°13′05″N 2°25′22″E
- Country: France
- Region: Hauts-de-France
- Department: Oise
- Arrondissement: Senlis
- Canton: Montataire
- Intercommunality: CA Creil Sud Oise

Government
  - Mayor (2020–2026): Frédéric Besset
- Area^{1}: 13.08 km^{2} (5.05 sq mi)
- Elevation: 29 m (95 ft)
- Highest elevation: 137 m (449 ft)
- Lowest elevation: 25 m (82 ft)
- Population (2023): 4,638
  - Density: 354.6/km^{2} (918.4/sq mi)
- Time zone: UTC+01:00 (CET)
  - Summer (DST): UTC+02:00 (CEST)
- INSEE/Postal code: 60584 /60340
- ^{1} French Land Register data, which excludes lakes, ponds, glaciers > 1 km^{2} (0.386 sq mi or 247 acres) and river estuaries.

Saint-Leu-d'Esserent (French pronunciation: [sɛ̃ lø dɛsʁɑ̃]) is a commune in the Oise department in northern France.

Saint Leu is notable for 3,000 square metres (32,000 sq ft) of mushroom quarries under the Thiverny plateau.

== History ==
During World War II, the quarries were one of three major underground V-1 flying bomb storage depots. In addition to the quarries, the facility included blockhouses, bunkers, flak emplacements and railway links. Allied intelligence firmly identified late in June 1944 that Saint-Leu-d'Esserent and Nucourt were V-1 storage depots. On 27 June 1944, Saint-Leu-d'Esserent was initially bombed by the US Army Air Force, then on 4/5 July 1944 by two RAF forces (the first unsuccessfully used Tallboy bombs in an attempt to collapse the limestone roof of the quarries). Finally on 7 July 1944, an evening RAF raid successfully blocked the tunnels.

The storage dump at Thiverny was bombed in 1944 on 5 May, 11 July, 12 July and 19 July.

== Population ==
Historical population
Year	Pop.	±% p.a.
1968	3,587	—
1975	4,462	+3.17%
1982	4,459	−0.01%
1990	4,288	−0.49%
1999	4,867	+1.42%
2007	4,724	−0.37%
2012	4,667	−0.24%
2017	4,688	+0.09%
2023	4,638	−0.18%
Source: INSEE

== See also ==
- Communes of the Oise department
- V-1 flying bomb (facilities)
