= Cires-lès-Mello =

- Commune
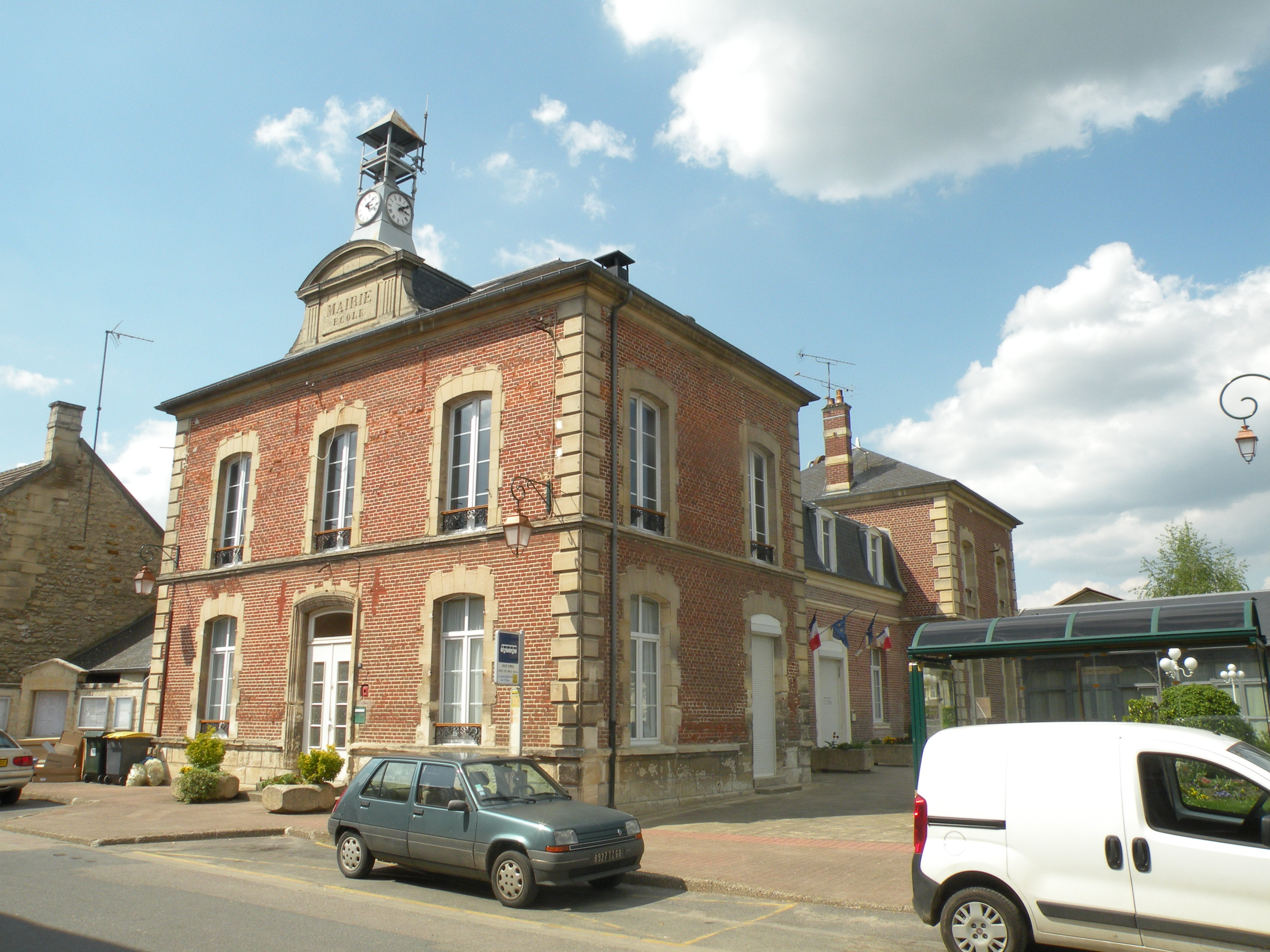
- The town hall in Cires-lès-Mello

- Coat of arms
- Location of Cires-lès-Mello
- Location within France Location within Hauts-de-France
- Coordinates: 49°16′26″N 2°21′27″E
- Country: France
- Region: Hauts-de-France
- Department: Oise
- Arrondissement: Senlis
- Canton: Montataire

Government
  - Mayor (2020–2026): Alain Guerinet
- Area^{1}: 16.73 km^{2} (6.46 sq mi)
- Elevation: 37 m (121 ft)
- Highest elevation: 149 m (489 ft)
- Lowest elevation: 32 m (105 ft)
- Population (2023): 3,978
  - Density: 237.8/km^{2} (615.8/sq mi)
- Time zone: UTC+01:00 (CET)
  - Summer (DST): UTC+02:00 (CEST)
- INSEE/Postal code: 60155 /60660
- ^{1} French Land Register data, which excludes lakes, ponds, glaciers > 1 km^{2} (0.386 sq mi or 247 acres) and river estuaries.

Cires-lès-Mello (French pronunciation: [siʁ lɛ mɛlo], literally Cires near Mello) is a commune in the Oise department in northern France. Cires-lès-Mello station has rail connections to Beauvais and Creil.

== Population ==
Historical population
Year	Pop.	±% p.a.
1968	1,490	—
1975	1,884	+3.41%
1982	2,992	+6.83%
1990	3,458	+1.83%
1999	3,585	+0.40%
2007	3,482	−0.36%
2012	3,696	+1.20%
2017	3,977	+1.48%
2023	3,978	+0.00%
Source: INSEE

== See also ==
- Communes of the Oise department
