= Cires-lès-Mello station =

French railway station

Cires-lès-Mello
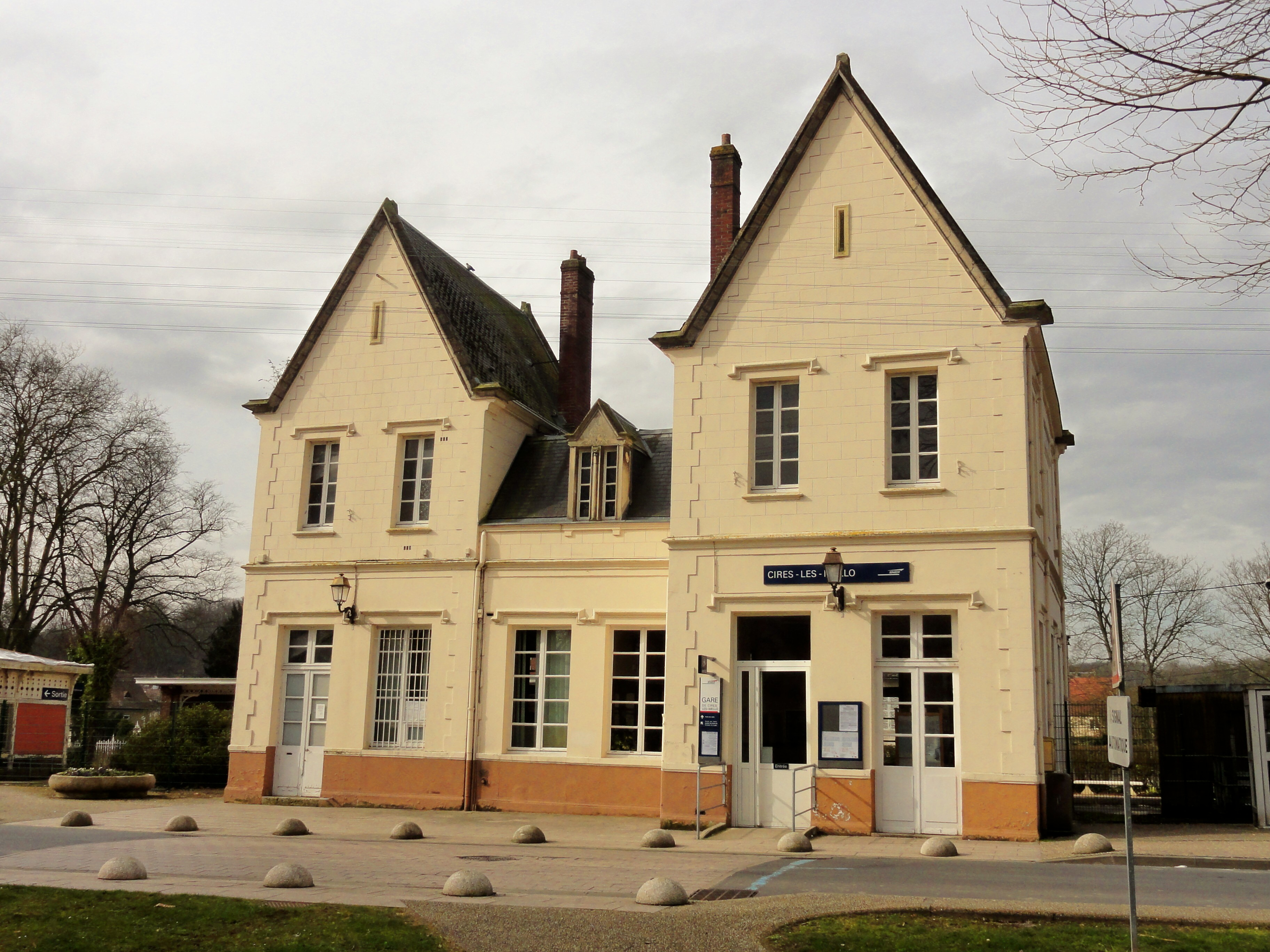
- Station building and entrance

General information
- Location: Rue de la Station; Cires-lès-Mello
- Coordinates: 49°16′21″N 2°21′37″E
- Owner: RFF/SNCF
- Line: Creil–Beauvais railway

Other information
- Station code: 87313551

Services
| Preceding station | TER Hauts-de-France | Following station |
|---|---|---|
| Balagny–Saint-Épin towards Beauvais | Proxi P32 | Cramoisy towards Creil |
Location

Cires-lès-Mello is a railway station located in the commune of Cires-lès-Mello in the Oise department, France. The station is served by TER Hauts-de-France trains (Beauvais - Creil line, line P32).

== See also ==
- List of SNCF stations in Hauts-de-France
