= Foulangues =

- Commune
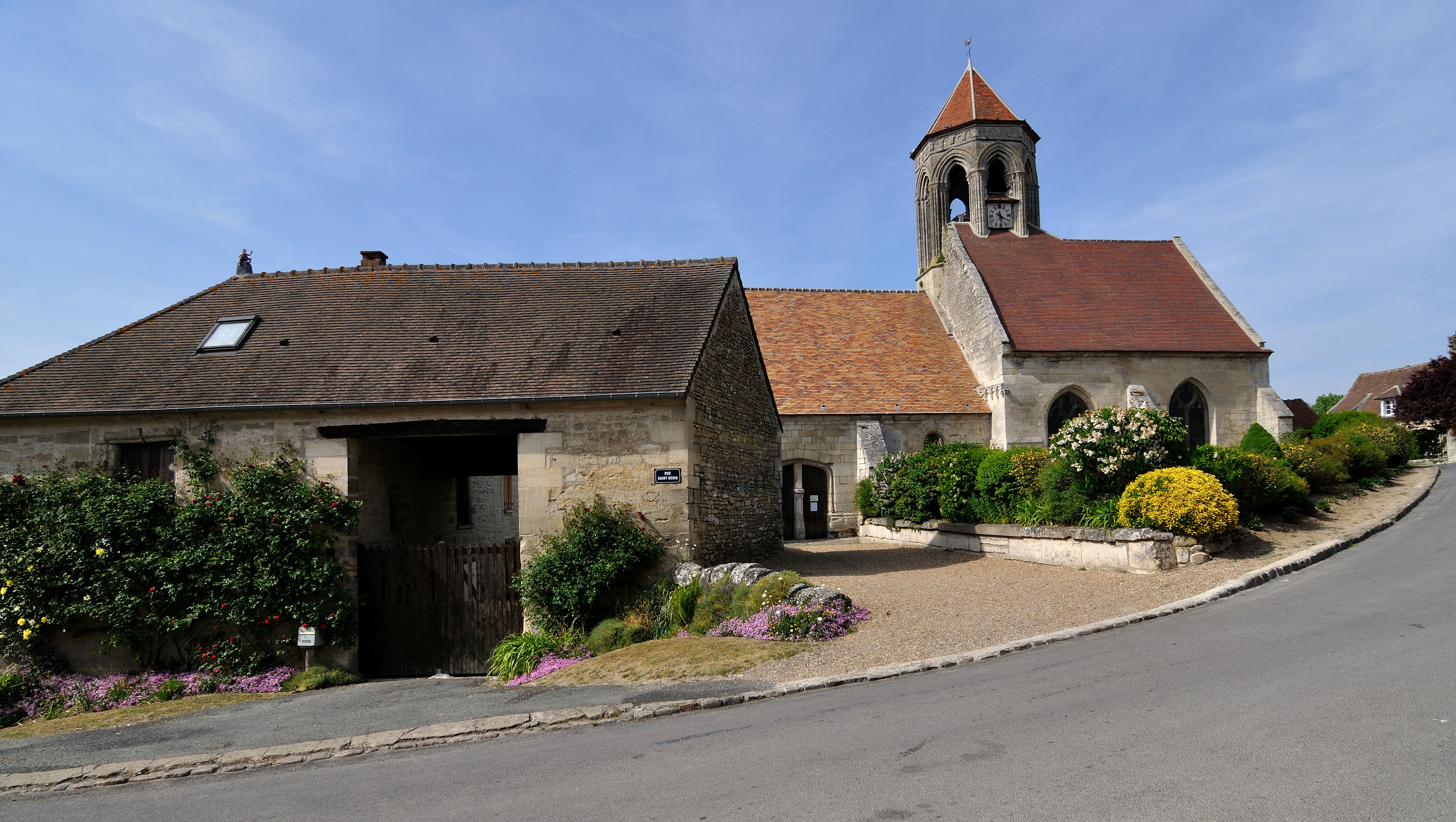
- The church in Foulangues
- Location of Foulangues
- Location within France Location within Hauts-de-France
- Coordinates: 49°16′32″N 2°18′52″E
- Country: France
- Region: Hauts-de-France
- Department: Oise
- Arrondissement: Senlis
- Canton: Montataire

Government
  - Mayor (2020–2026): Annie Blanquet
- Area^{1}: 5.13 km^{2} (1.98 sq mi)
- Elevation: 70 m (230 ft)
- Highest elevation: 119 m (390 ft)
- Lowest elevation: 42 m (138 ft)
- Population (2023): 193
  - Density: 37.6/km^{2} (97.4/sq mi)
- Time zone: UTC+01:00 (CET)
  - Summer (DST): UTC+02:00 (CEST)
- INSEE/Postal code: 60249 /60250
- ^{1} French Land Register data, which excludes lakes, ponds, glaciers > 1 km^{2} (0.386 sq mi or 247 acres) and river estuaries.

Foulangues (French pronunciation: [fulɑ̃ɡ]) is a commune in the Oise department in northern France.

== See also ==
- Communes of the Oise department
