= Saint-Vaast-lès-Mello =

- Commune
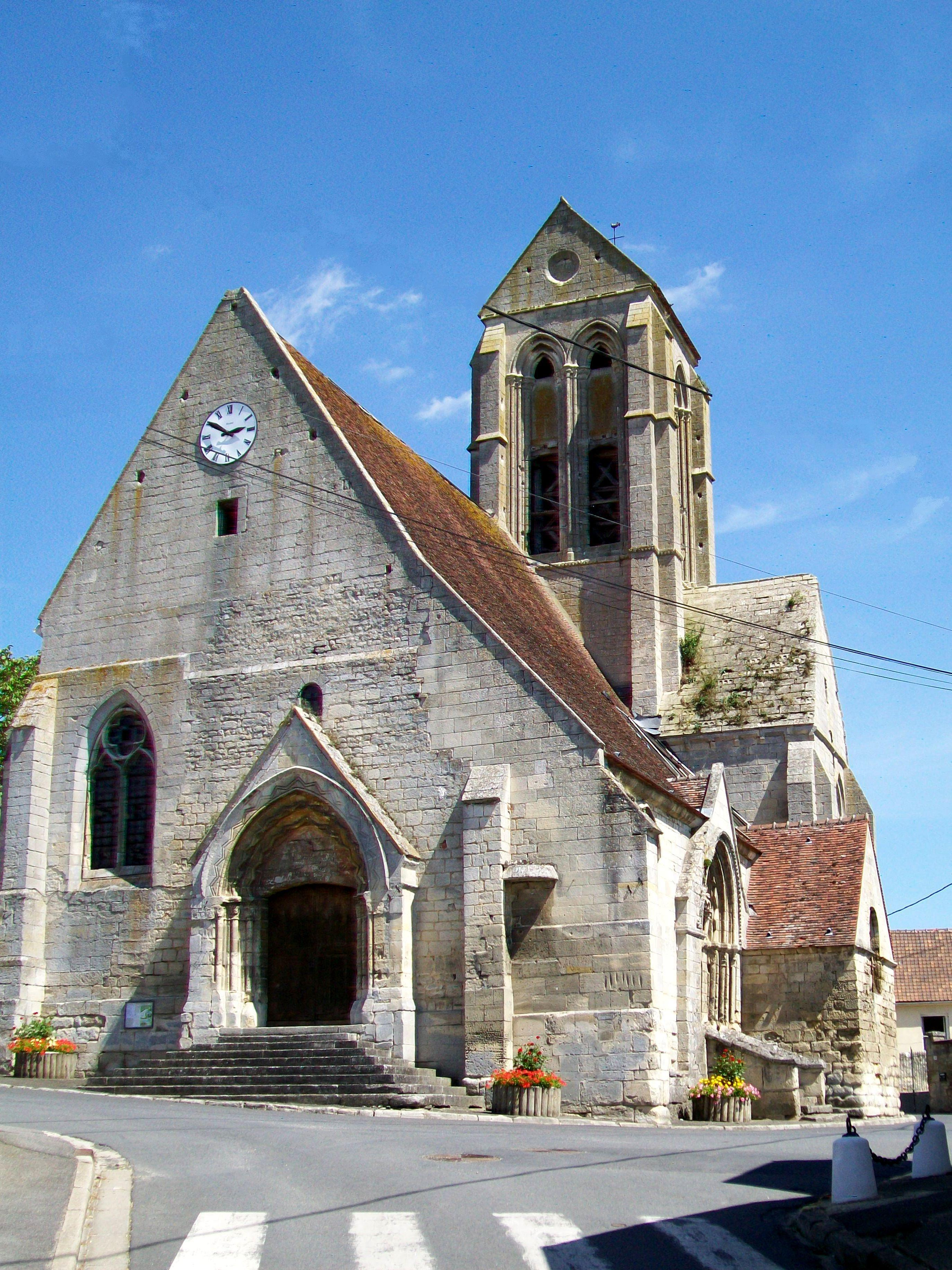
- The church in Saint-Vaast-lès-Mello
- Location of Saint-Vaast-lès-Mello
- Location within France Location within Hauts-de-France
- Coordinates: 49°16′04″N 2°23′35″E
- Country: France
- Region: Hauts-de-France
- Department: Oise
- Arrondissement: Senlis
- Canton: Montataire
- Intercommunality: CA Creil Sud Oise

Government
  - Mayor (2021–2026): Nathalie Varlet
- Area^{1}: 7.97 km^{2} (3.08 sq mi)
- Elevation: 100 m (330 ft)
- Highest elevation: 112 m (367 ft)
- Lowest elevation: 30 m (98 ft)
- Population (2023): 984
  - Density: 123/km^{2} (320/sq mi)
- Time zone: UTC+01:00 (CET)
  - Summer (DST): UTC+02:00 (CEST)
- INSEE/Postal code: 60601 /60660
- ^{1} French Land Register data, which excludes lakes, ponds, glaciers > 1 km^{2} (0.386 sq mi or 247 acres) and river estuaries.

Saint-Vaast-lès-Mello (French pronunciation: [sɛ̃ va(st) lɛ mɛlo], literally Saint-Vaast near Mello) is a commune in the Oise department in northern France.

== See also ==
- Communes of the Oise department
