= Neuville-au-Bois =

- Commune
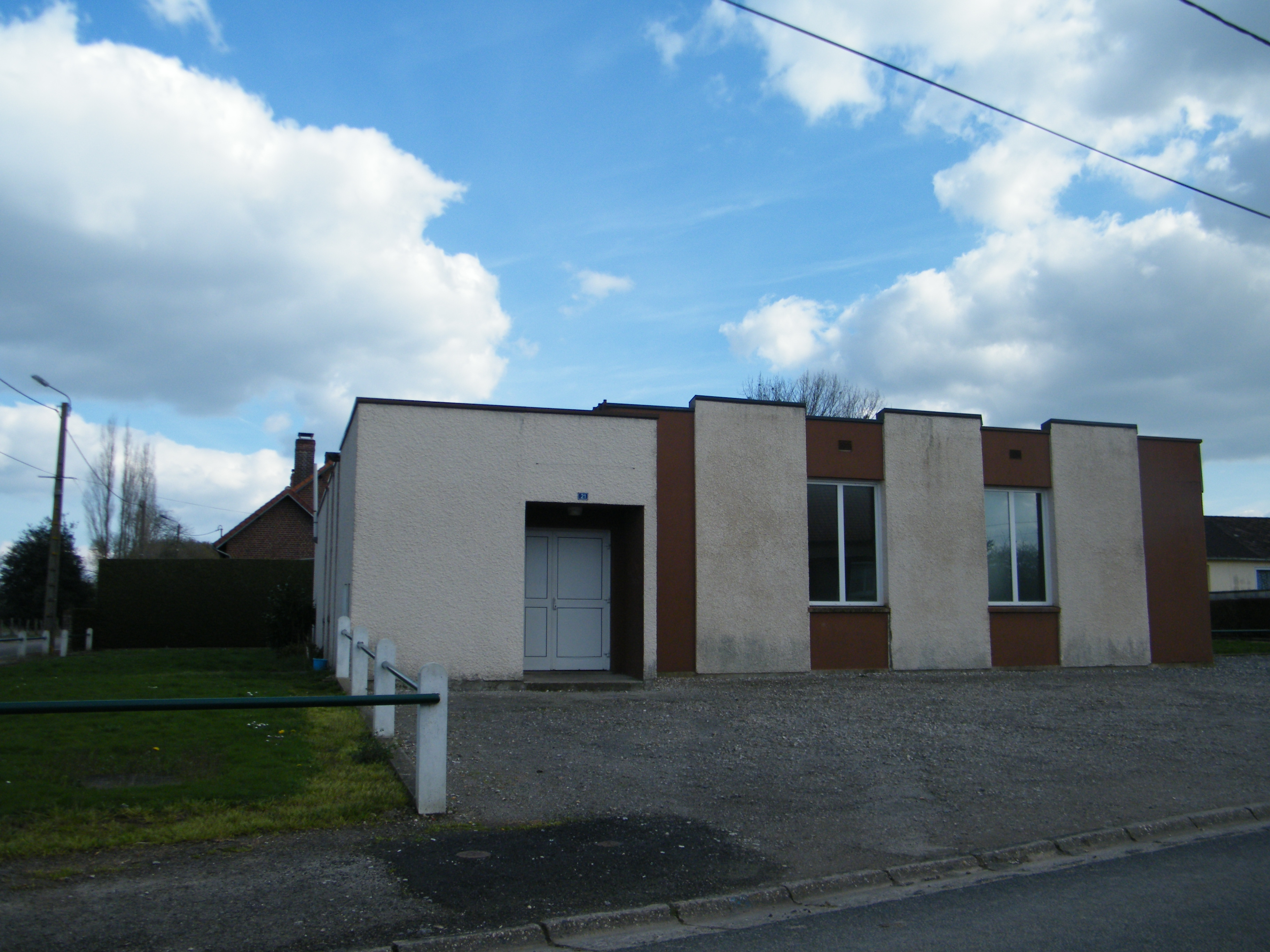
- The town hall in Neuville-au-Bois
- Location of Neuville-au-Bois
- Location within France Location within Hauts-de-France
- Coordinates: 49°58′25″N 1°47′24″E
- Country: France
- Region: Hauts-de-France
- Department: Somme
- Arrondissement: Amiens
- Canton: Poix-de-Picardie
- Intercommunality: CC Somme Sud-Ouest

Government
  - Mayor (2020–2026): Daniel Dancourt
- Area^{1}: 2.93 km^{2} (1.13 sq mi)
- Elevation: 100 m (330 ft)
- Highest elevation: 118 m (387 ft)
- Lowest elevation: 89 m (292 ft)
- Population (2023): 144
  - Density: 49.1/km^{2} (127/sq mi)
- Time zone: UTC+01:00 (CET)
  - Summer (DST): UTC+02:00 (CEST)
- INSEE/Postal code: 80591 /80140
- ^{1} French Land Register data, which excludes lakes, ponds, glaciers > 1 km^{2} (0.386 sq mi or 247 acres) and river estuaries.

Neuville-au-Bois (French pronunciation: [nøvil o bwa]) is a commune in the Somme department in Hauts-de-France in northern France.

== Geography ==
The commune is situated on the D53 road, some 10 miles (16 km) south of Abbeville.

== Population ==
Historical population
Year	Pop.	±% p.a.
1968	160	—
1975	174	+1.21%
1982	169	−0.42%
1990	190	+1.47%
1999	183	−0.42%
2007	183	+0.00%
2012	159	−2.77%
2017	153	−0.77%
2023	144	−1.01%
Source: INSEE

== See also ==
- Communes of the Somme department
