= Siracourt =

- Commune
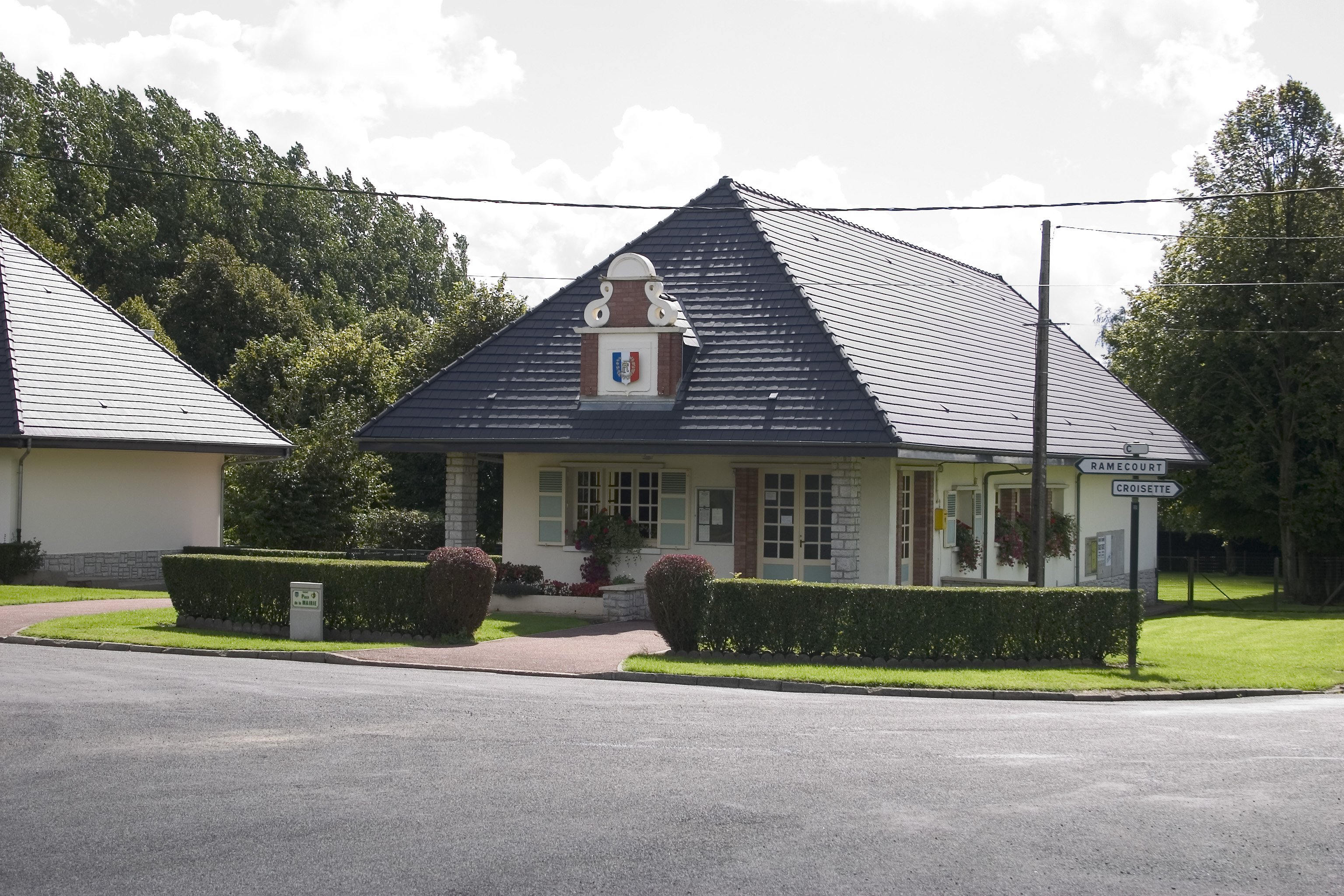
- The town hall and school of Siracourt

- Coat of arms
- Location of Siracourt
- Location within France Location within Hauts-de-France
- Coordinates: 50°22′24″N 2°16′18″E
- Country: France
- Region: Hauts-de-France
- Department: Pas-de-Calais
- Arrondissement: Arras
- Canton: Saint-Pol-sur-Ternoise
- Intercommunality: CC Ternois

Government
  - Mayor (2020–2026): André Genelle
- Area^{1}: 3.14 km^{2} (1.21 sq mi)
- Highest elevation: 154 m (505 ft)
- Lowest elevation: 124 m (407 ft)
- Population (2023): 286
  - Density: 91.1/km^{2} (236/sq mi)
- Time zone: UTC+01:00 (CET)
  - Summer (DST): UTC+02:00 (CEST)
- INSEE/Postal code: 62797 /62130
- ^{1} French Land Register data, which excludes lakes, ponds, glaciers > 1 km^{2} (0.386 sq mi or 247 acres) and river estuaries.

Siracourt (French pronunciation: [siʁakuʁ]) is a commune in the Pas-de-Calais department in the Hauts-de-France region of France.

== Geography ==
Siracourt lies 27 miles (43 km) west of Arras and 3 miles (5 km) west of Saint-Pol-sur-Ternoise, near the junction of the D100 and N39 roads.

== Population ==
Historical population
Year	Pop.	±% p.a.
1968	158	—
1975	163	+0.45%
1982	140	−2.15%
1990	223	+5.99%
1999	228	+0.25%
2007	240	+0.64%
2012	257	+1.38%
2017	269	+0.92%
2023	286	+1.03%
Source: INSEE

== Places of interest ==
- The modern church of St. Germain, rebuilt, along with the entire village after World War II.
- The Siracourt V-1 bunker, built during World War II.

== See also ==
- Communes of the Pas-de-Calais department
