= Saint-Martin-l'Hortier =

- Commune
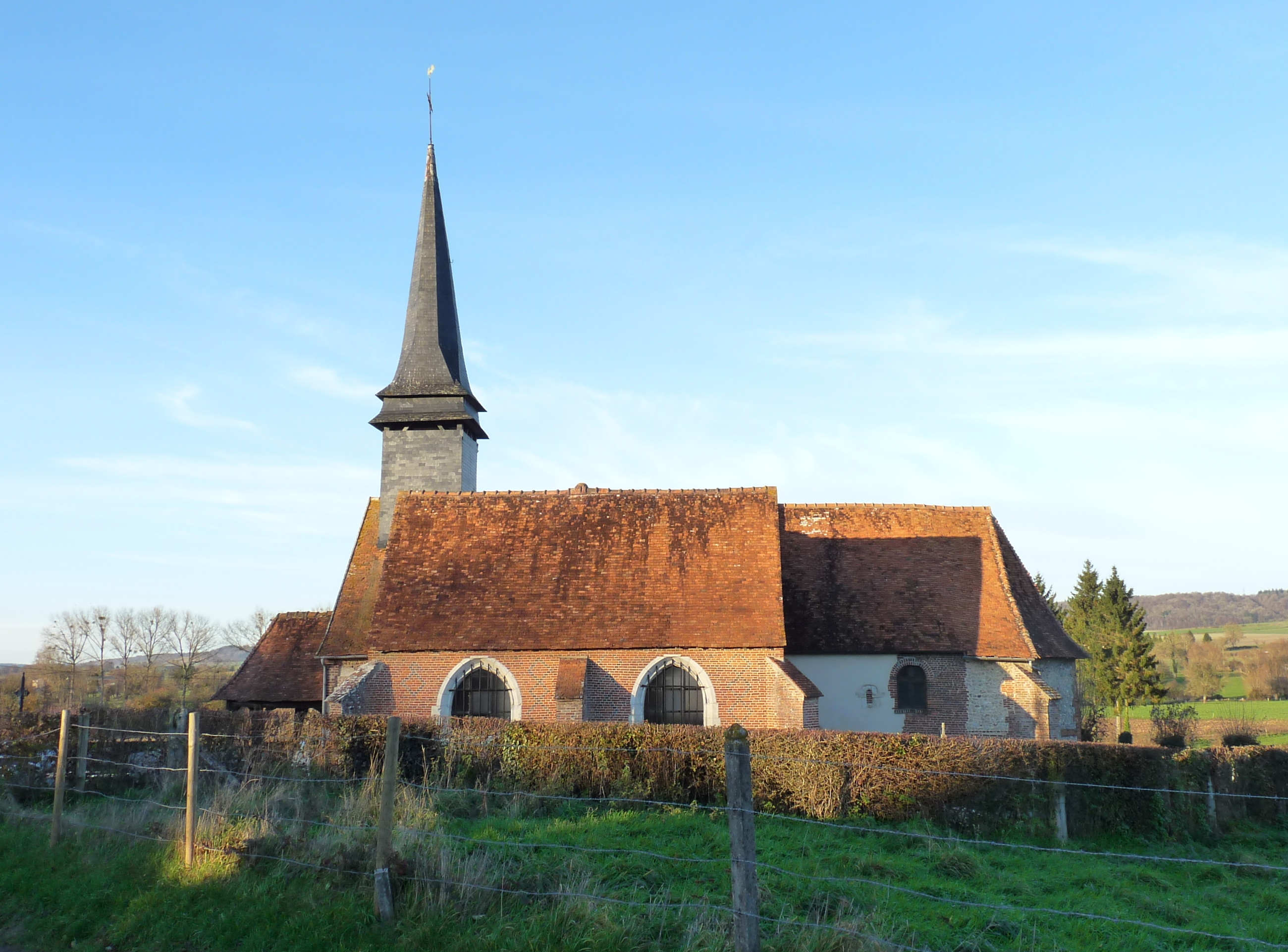
- The church in Saint-Martin-l'Hortier
- Location of Saint-Martin-l'Hortier
- Location within France Location within Normandy
- Coordinates: 49°44′38″N 1°24′30″E
- Country: France
- Region: Normandy
- Department: Seine-Maritime
- Arrondissement: Dieppe
- Canton: Neufchâtel-en-Bray
- Intercommunality: CC Bray-Eawy

Government
  - Mayor (2026–32): Sylvain Papillon
- Area^{1}: 5.79 km^{2} (2.24 sq mi)
- Elevation: 71 m (233 ft)
- Highest elevation: 221 m (725 ft)
- Lowest elevation: 64 m (210 ft)
- Population (2023): 272
  - Density: 47.0/km^{2} (122/sq mi)
- Time zone: UTC+01:00 (CET)
  - Summer (DST): UTC+02:00 (CEST)
- INSEE/Postal code: 76620 /76270
- ^{1} French Land Register data, which excludes lakes, ponds, glaciers > 1 km^{2} (0.386 sq mi or 247 acres) and river estuaries.

Saint-Martin-l'Hortier (French pronunciation: [sɛ̃ maʁtɛ̃ lɔʁtje]) is a commune in the Seine-Maritime department in the Normandy region in northern France.

== Geography ==
A small farming village situated by the banks of the river Béthune in the Pays de Bray, at the junction of the roads, some 18 miles (29 km) southeast of Dieppe.

== Population ==
Historical population
Year	Pop.	±% p.a.
1968	160	—
1975	175	+1.29%
1982	202	+2.07%
1990	197	−0.31%
1999	198	+0.06%
2007	239	+2.38%
2012	263	+1.93%
2017	278	+1.12%
2023	272	−0.36%
Source: INSEE

== Places of interest ==
- The church of St. Martin, dating from the seventeenth century.

== See also ==
- Communes of the Seine-Maritime department
