= Maisoncelle =

- Commune
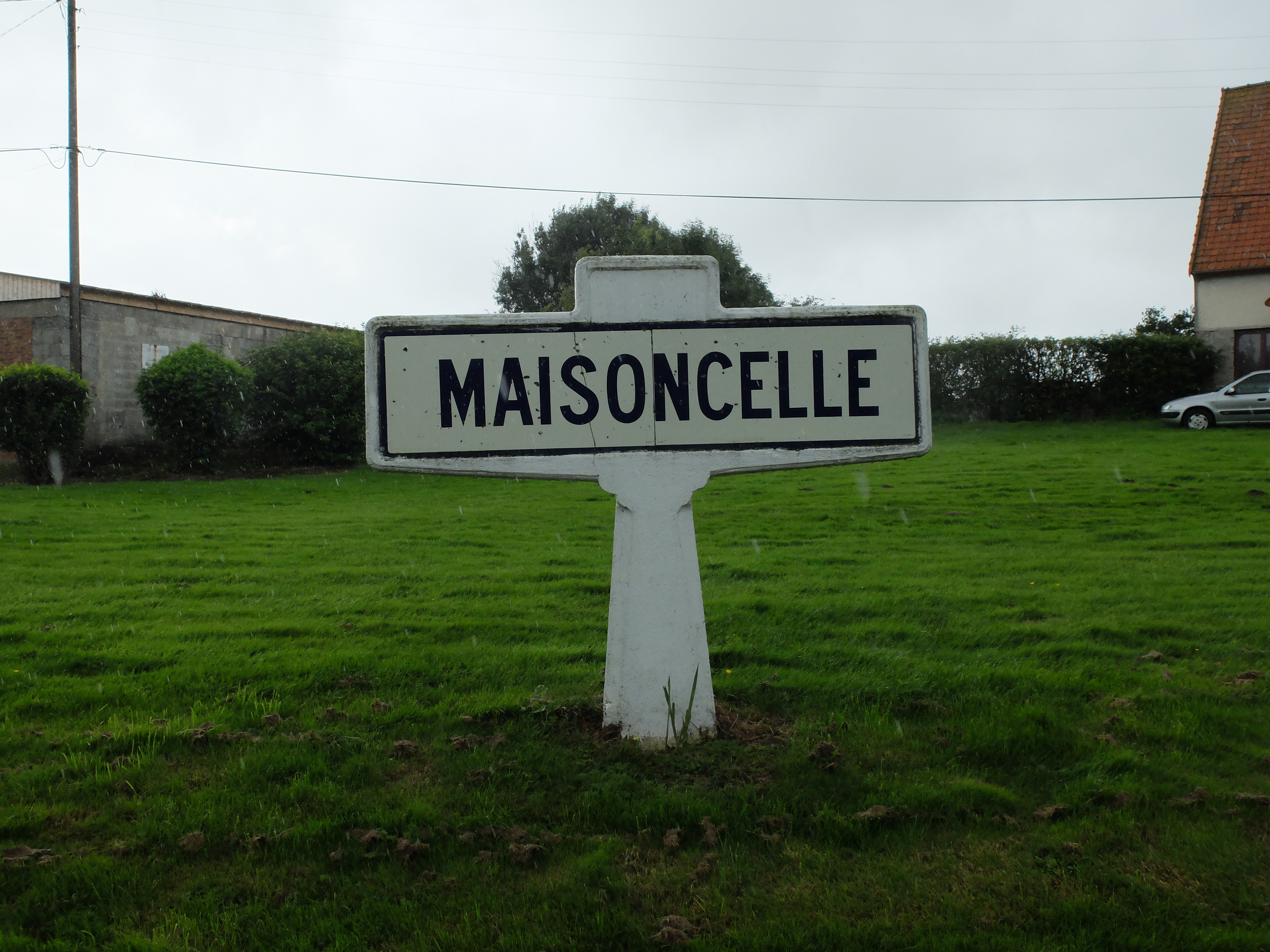
- An old road sign on the way into Maisoncelle

- Coat of arms
- Location of Maisoncelle
- Location within France Location within Hauts-de-France
- Coordinates: 50°26′56″N 2°08′39″E
- Country: France
- Region: Hauts-de-France
- Department: Pas-de-Calais
- Arrondissement: Montreuil
- Canton: Auxi-le-Château
- Intercommunality: CC des 7 Vallées

Government
  - Mayor (2020–2026): Etienne Perin
- Area^{1}: 4.3 km^{2} (1.7 sq mi)
- Elevation: 120 m (390 ft)
- Highest elevation: 131 m (430 ft)
- Lowest elevation: 87 m (285 ft)
- Population (2023): 119
  - Density: 28/km^{2} (72/sq mi)
- Time zone: UTC+01:00 (CET)
  - Summer (DST): UTC+02:00 (CEST)
- INSEE/Postal code: 62541 /62310
- ^{1} French Land Register data, which excludes lakes, ponds, glaciers > 1 km^{2} (0.386 sq mi or 247 acres) and river estuaries.

Maisoncelle (French pronunciation: [mɛzɔ̃sɛl]) is a commune in the Pas-de-Calais department in the Hauts-de-France region of France 14 miles (23 km) east of Montreuil-sur-Mer.

== Population ==
Historical population
Year	Pop.	±% p.a.
1968	141	—
1975	122	−2.05%
1982	118	−0.48%
1990	103	−1.69%
1999	106	+0.32%
2007	114	+0.91%
2012	126	+2.02%
2017	125	−0.16%
2023	119	−0.82%
Source: INSEE

== See also ==
- Communes of the Pas-de-Calais department
