= Gorenflos =

- Commune
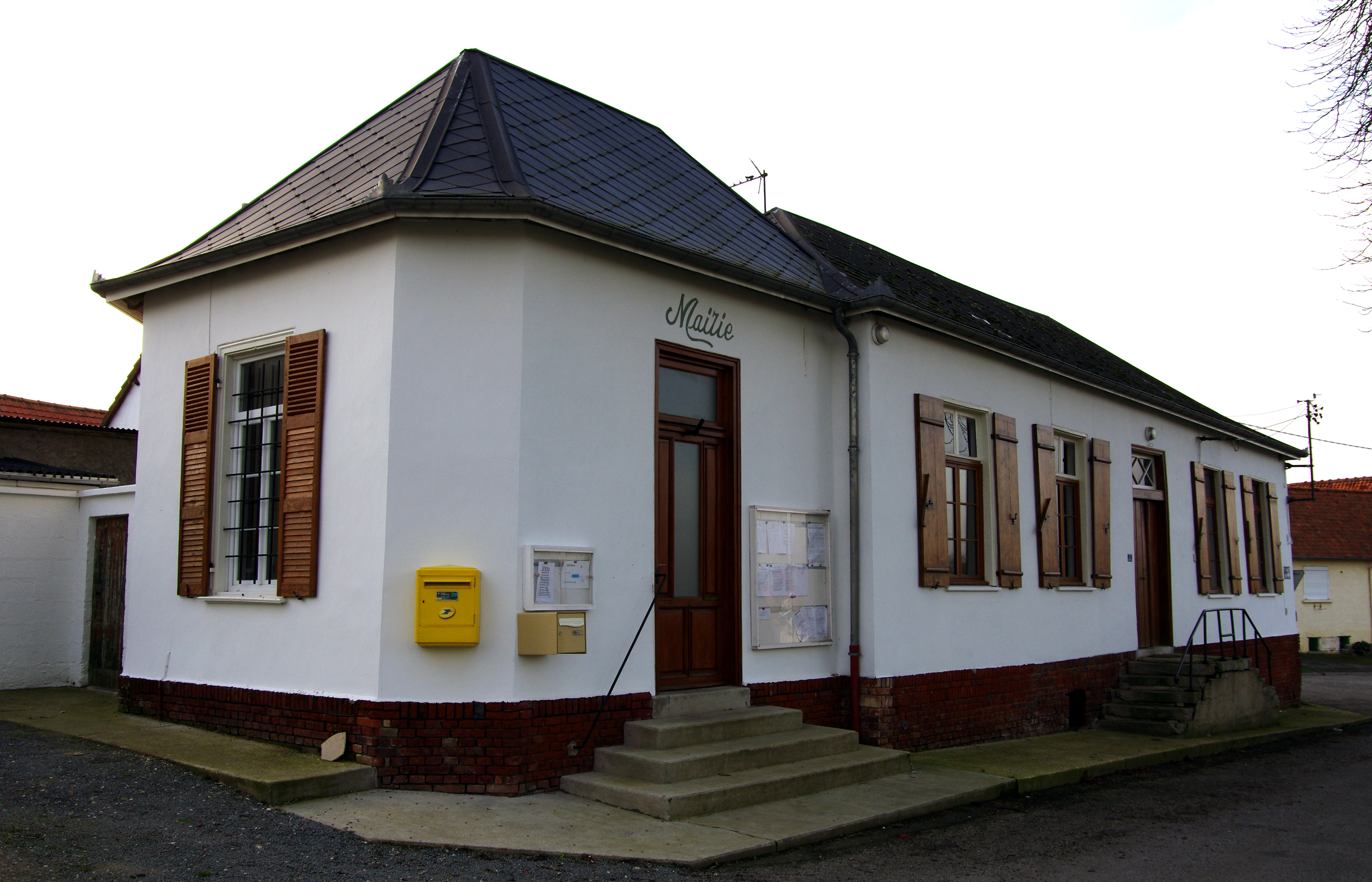
- The town hall in Gorenflos

- Coat of arms
- Location of Gorenflos
- Location within France Location within Hauts-de-France
- Coordinates: 50°05′45″N 2°03′03″E
- Country: France
- Region: Hauts-de-France
- Department: Somme
- Arrondissement: Abbeville
- Canton: Rue
- Intercommunality: CC Ponthieu-Marquenterre

Government
  - Mayor (2020–2026): Jean-Paul Pruvot
- Area^{1}: 6.17 km^{2} (2.38 sq mi)
- Elevation: 100 m (330 ft)
- Highest elevation: 117 m (384 ft)
- Lowest elevation: 77 m (253 ft)
- Population (2023): 234
  - Density: 37.9/km^{2} (98.2/sq mi)
- Time zone: UTC+01:00 (CET)
  - Summer (DST): UTC+02:00 (CEST)
- INSEE/Postal code: 80380 /80690
- ^{1} French Land Register data, which excludes lakes, ponds, glaciers > 1 km^{2} (0.386 sq mi or 247 acres) and river estuaries.

Gorenflos (French pronunciation: [ɡɔʁɑ̃flo]; Picard: Granflo) is a commune in the Somme department in Hauts-de-France in northern France.

== Geography ==
Gorenflos is situated at the junction of the D12, D46 and D66 roads, some 13 miles (21 km) east of Abbeville.

== Population ==
Historical population
Year	Pop.	±% p.a.
1968	251	—
1975	219	−1.93%
1982	215	−0.26%
1990	198	−1.02%
1999	232	+1.78%
2007	259	+1.39%
2012	212	−3.93%
2017	254	+3.68%
2023	234	−1.36%
Source: INSEE

== See also ==
- Communes of the Somme department
