= Précy-sur-Oise =

- Commune
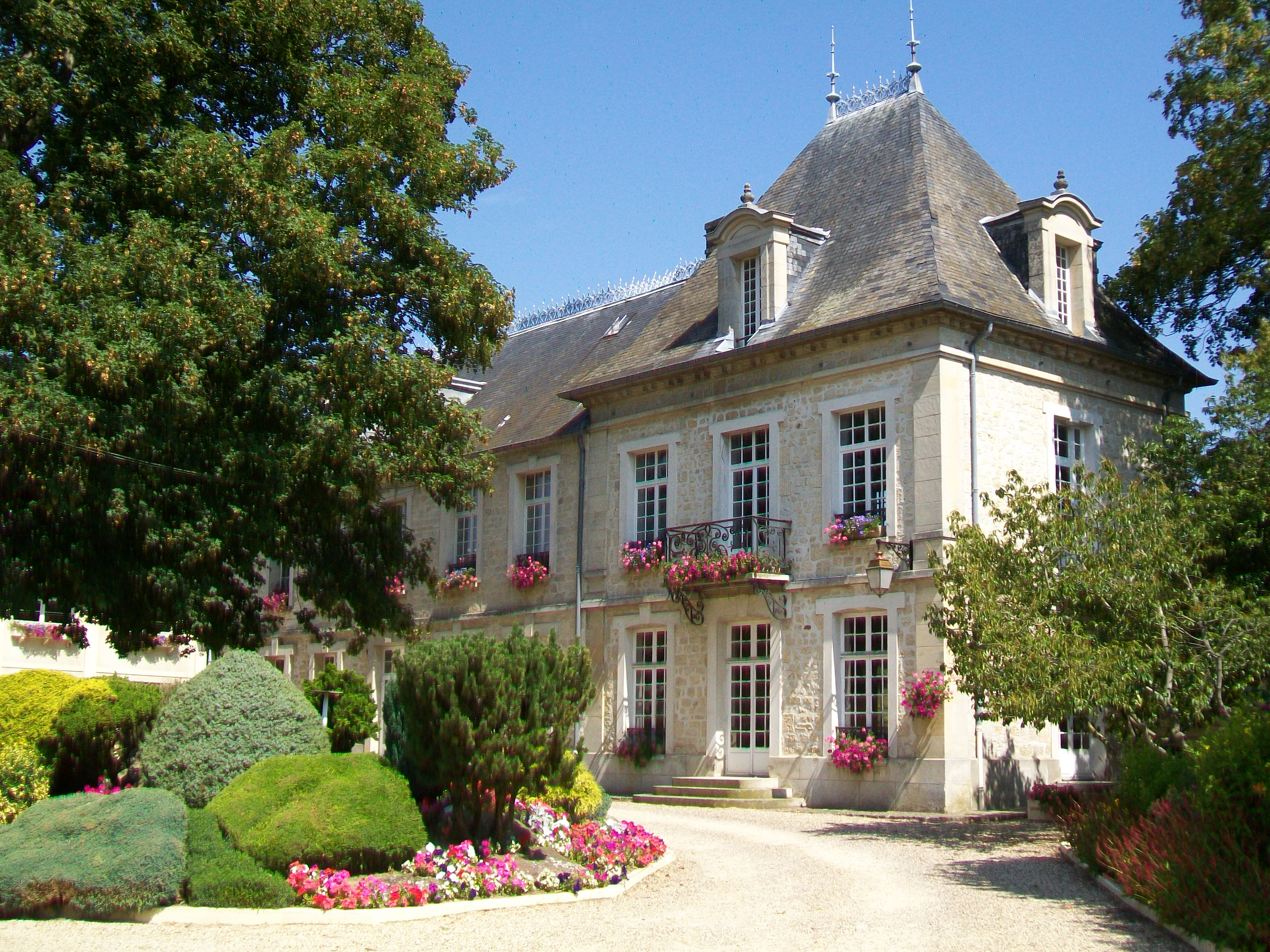
- The château in Précy-sur-Oise

- Coat of arms
- Location of Précy-sur-Oise
- Location within France Location within Hauts-de-France
- Coordinates: 49°12′24″N 2°22′16″E
- Country: France
- Region: Hauts-de-France
- Department: Oise
- Arrondissement: Senlis
- Canton: Montataire
- Intercommunality: CC Thelloise

Government
  - Mayor (2020–2026): Philippe Eloy
- Area^{1}: 9.65 km^{2} (3.73 sq mi)
- Highest elevation: 123 m (404 ft)
- Lowest elevation: 23 m (75 ft)
- Population (2023): 3,332
  - Density: 345/km^{2} (894/sq mi)
- Demonym: Précéens
- Time zone: UTC+01:00 (CET)
  - Summer (DST): UTC+02:00 (CEST)
- INSEE/Postal code: 60513 /60460
- Website: precy.fr
- ^{1} French Land Register data, which excludes lakes, ponds, glaciers > 1 km^{2} (0.386 sq mi or 247 acres) and river estuaries.

Précy-sur-Oise (French pronunciation: [pʁesi syʁ waz]; lit. 'Précy-on-Oise') or simply Précy is a commune in the Oise department in northern France.

== Transport ==
Précy-sur-Oise station is served by Transilien Line H on the Pierrelaye–Creil railway.

== Population ==
Historical population
Year	Pop.	±% p.a.
1968	2,045	—
1975	2,113	+0.47%
1982	2,694	+3.53%
1990	3,137	+1.92%
1999	3,120	−0.06%
2007	3,341	+0.86%
2012	3,197	−0.88%
2017	3,205	+0.05%
2023	3,332	+0.65%
Source: INSEE

== See also ==
- Communes of the Oise department
