= Thiverny =

- Commune
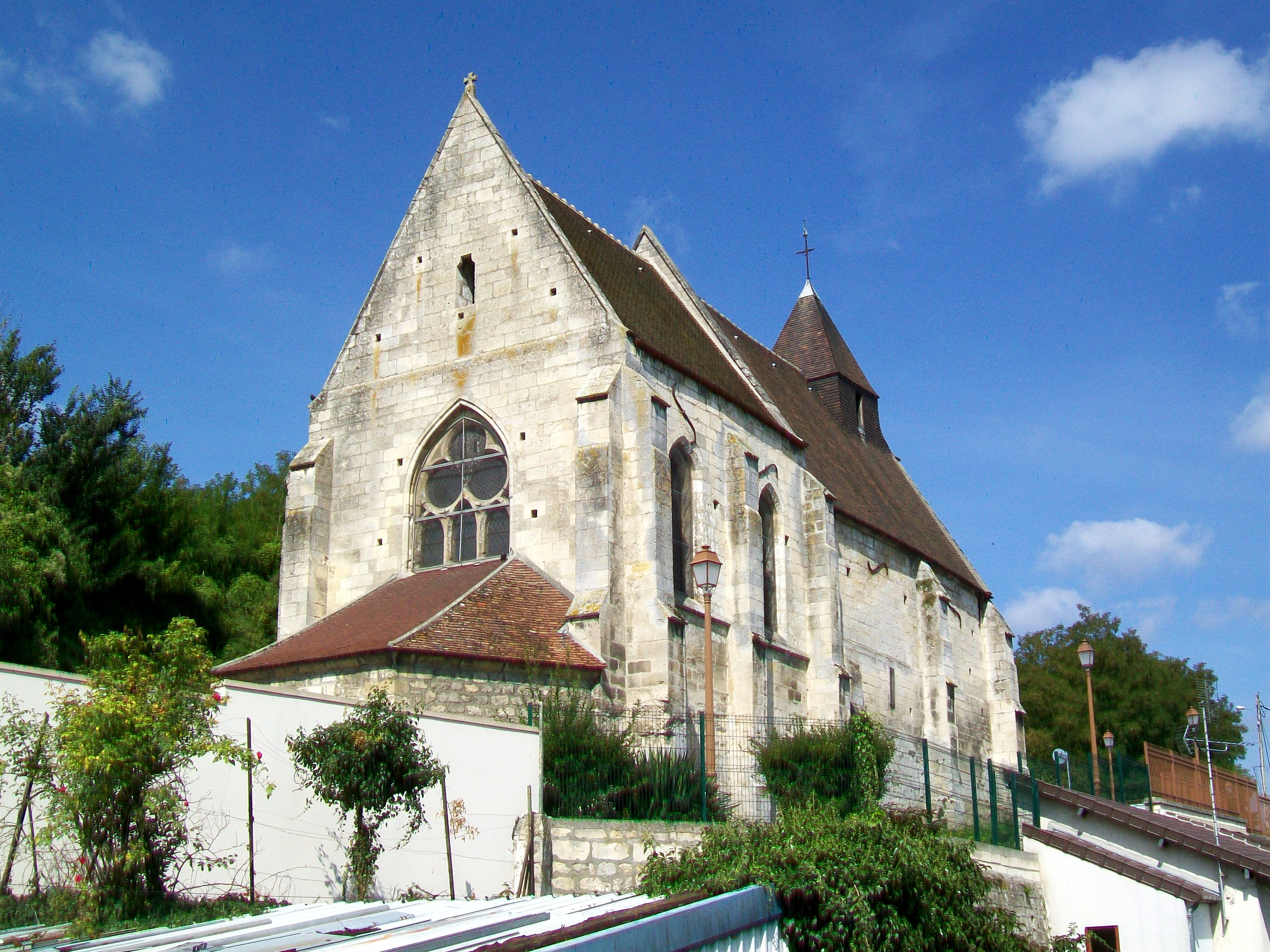
- The church in Thiverny
- Location of Thiverny
- Location within France Location within Hauts-de-France
- Coordinates: 49°14′55″N 2°25′59″E
- Country: France
- Region: Hauts-de-France
- Department: Oise
- Arrondissement: Senlis
- Canton: Montataire
- Intercommunality: CA Creil Sud Oise

Government
  - Mayor (2020–2026): Michel Blary
- Area^{1}: 2.06 km^{2} (0.80 sq mi)
- Elevation: 31 m (102 ft)
- Highest elevation: 86 m (282 ft)
- Lowest elevation: 27 m (89 ft)
- Population (2023): 1,041
  - Density: 505/km^{2} (1,310/sq mi)
- Time zone: UTC+01:00 (CET)
  - Summer (DST): UTC+02:00 (CEST)
- INSEE/Postal code: 60635 /60160
- ^{1} French Land Register data, which excludes lakes, ponds, glaciers > 1 km^{2} (0.386 sq mi or 247 acres) and river estuaries.

Thiverny (French pronunciation: [tivɛʁni]) is a commune in the Oise department in northern France.

== See also ==
- Communes of the Oise department
