= Bargny =

Bargny may refer to:

- Bargny, Oise, a commune in the Oise department in France
- Bargny, Senegal
