= Thury =

Thury may refer to:

== People ==
- Pierre de Thury ( -1410), said the cardinal Maillezais, a French cardinal of the Avignon Obedience, see Council of Pisa
- György Thury (1519–1571), a Hungarian nobleman (hu)
- Louis-Pierre Thury (died in 1699), French missionary priest in Acadia
- César-François Cassini de Thury (1714–1784), French geographer
- Louis-Étienne Héricart de Thury (1776–1854), French scientist and politician
- René Thury (1860–1938), a Swiss engineer

== Toponyms ==
=== France ===
- Thury, Côte-d'Or, in the Côte-d'Or (département)
- Thury, Yonne, in the Yonne (département)
- Thury-en-Valois, in the Oise (département)
- Thury-Harcourt, in the Calvados (département)
- Thury-sous-Clermont, in the Oise (département)
- La Villeneuve-sous-Thury, French commune in the Oise (département)

== Engineering ==
- Abbreviation for Thury-System, an outdated mechanical HVDC-system developed by René Thury
