= Antilly =

Antilly is the name of the following communes in France:

- Antilly, Moselle, in the Moselle department
- Antilly, Oise, in the Oise department
