= Gondreville =

Gondreville may refer to the following places in France:

- Gondreville, Loiret, a commune in the Loiret department
- Gondreville, Meurthe-et-Moselle, a commune in the Meurthe-et-Moselle department
- Gondreville, Oise, a commune in the Oise department
