= Versigny =

Versigny may refer to the following places in France:

- Versigny, Aisne, a commune in the department of Aisne
- Versigny, Oise, a commune in the department of Oise
