= Ivors =

- Commune
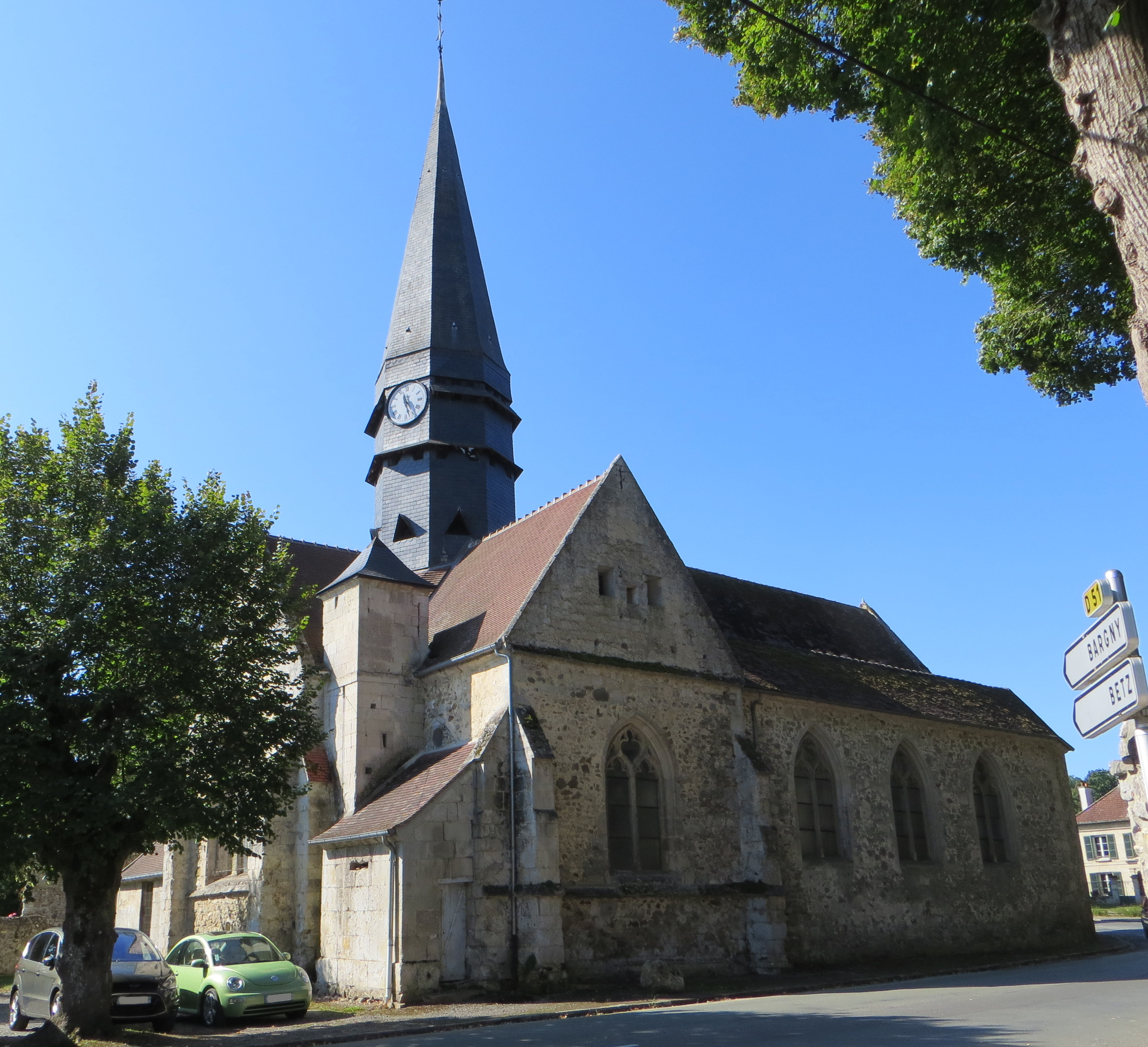
- The church in Ivors
- Location of Ivors
- Location within France Location within Hauts-de-France
- Coordinates: 49°12′07″N 3°01′02″E
- Country: France
- Region: Hauts-de-France
- Department: Oise
- Arrondissement: Senlis
- Canton: Nanteuil-le-Haudouin
- Intercommunality: Pays de Valois

Government
  - Mayor (2020–2026): Michel Collard
- Area^{1}: 8.35 km^{2} (3.22 sq mi)
- Elevation: 100 m (330 ft)
- Highest elevation: 151 m (495 ft)
- Lowest elevation: 82 m (269 ft)
- Population (2023): 250
  - Density: 30/km^{2} (78/sq mi)
- Time zone: UTC+01:00 (CET)
  - Summer (DST): UTC+02:00 (CEST)
- INSEE/Postal code: 60320 /60141
- ^{1} French Land Register data, which excludes lakes, ponds, glaciers > 1 km^{2} (0.386 sq mi or 247 acres) and river estuaries.

Ivors is a commune in the Oise department in northern France.

== See also ==
- Communes of the Oise department
