= Ormoy-Villers =

- Commune
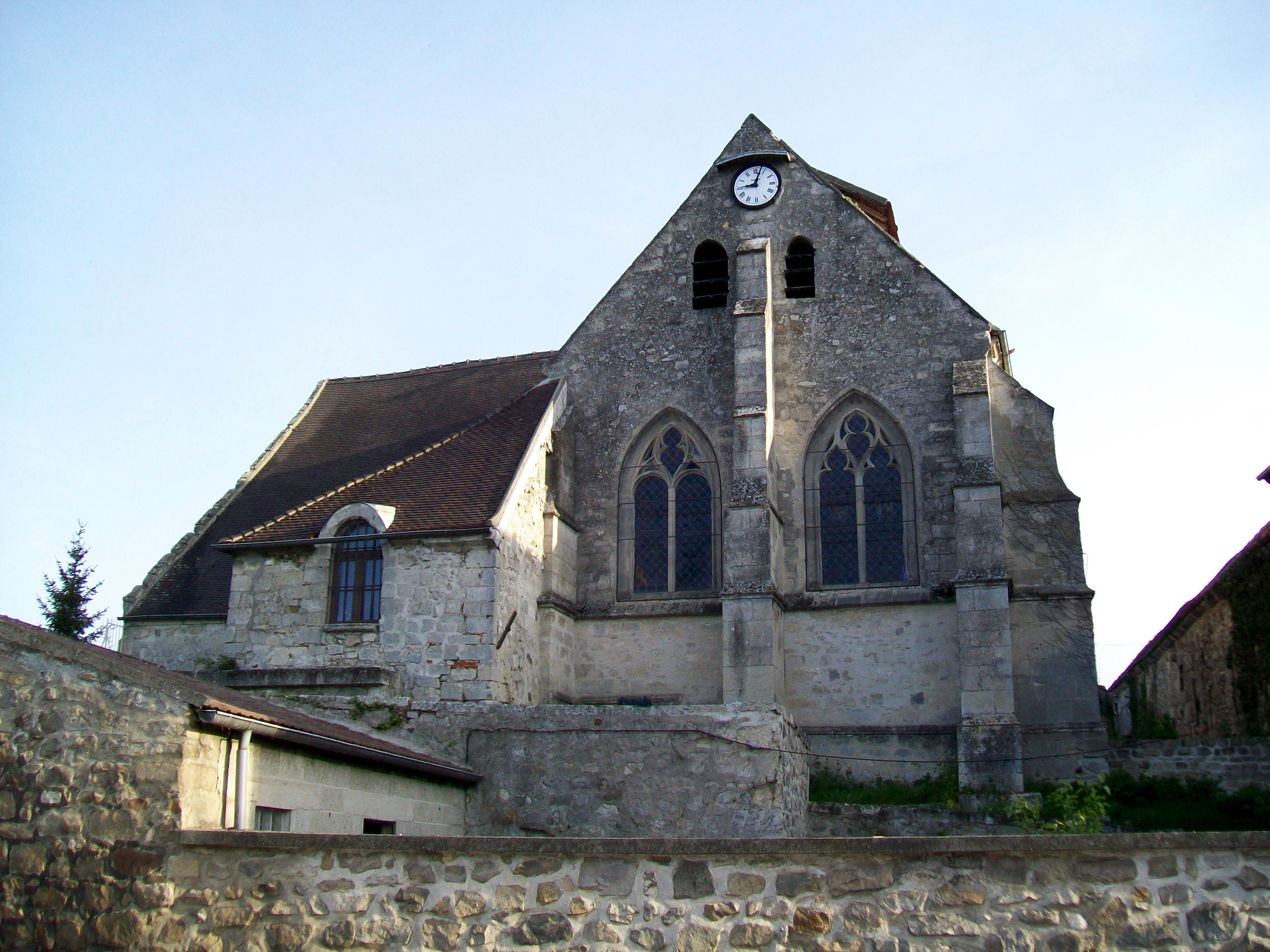
- The church in Ormoy-Villers
- Location of Ormoy-Villers
- Location within France Location within Hauts-de-France
- Coordinates: 49°11′50″N 2°50′28″E
- Country: France
- Region: Hauts-de-France
- Department: Oise
- Arrondissement: Senlis
- Canton: Nanteuil-le-Haudouin
- Intercommunality: Pays de Valois

Government
  - Mayor (2020–2026): Aude WOZNICZKA
- Area^{1}: 10.37 km^{2} (4.00 sq mi)
- Elevation: 94 m (308 ft)
- Highest elevation: 131 m (430 ft)
- Lowest elevation: 84 m (276 ft)
- Population (2023): 805
  - Density: 77.6/km^{2} (201/sq mi)
- Time zone: UTC+01:00 (CET)
  - Summer (DST): UTC+02:00 (CEST)
- INSEE/Postal code: 60479 /60800
- ^{1} French Land Register data, which excludes lakes, ponds, glaciers > 1 km^{2} (0.386 sq mi or 247 acres) and river estuaries.

Ormoy-Villers is a commune in the Oise department in northern France.

== See also ==
- Communes of the Oise department
