= Fresnoy-le-Luat =

- Commune
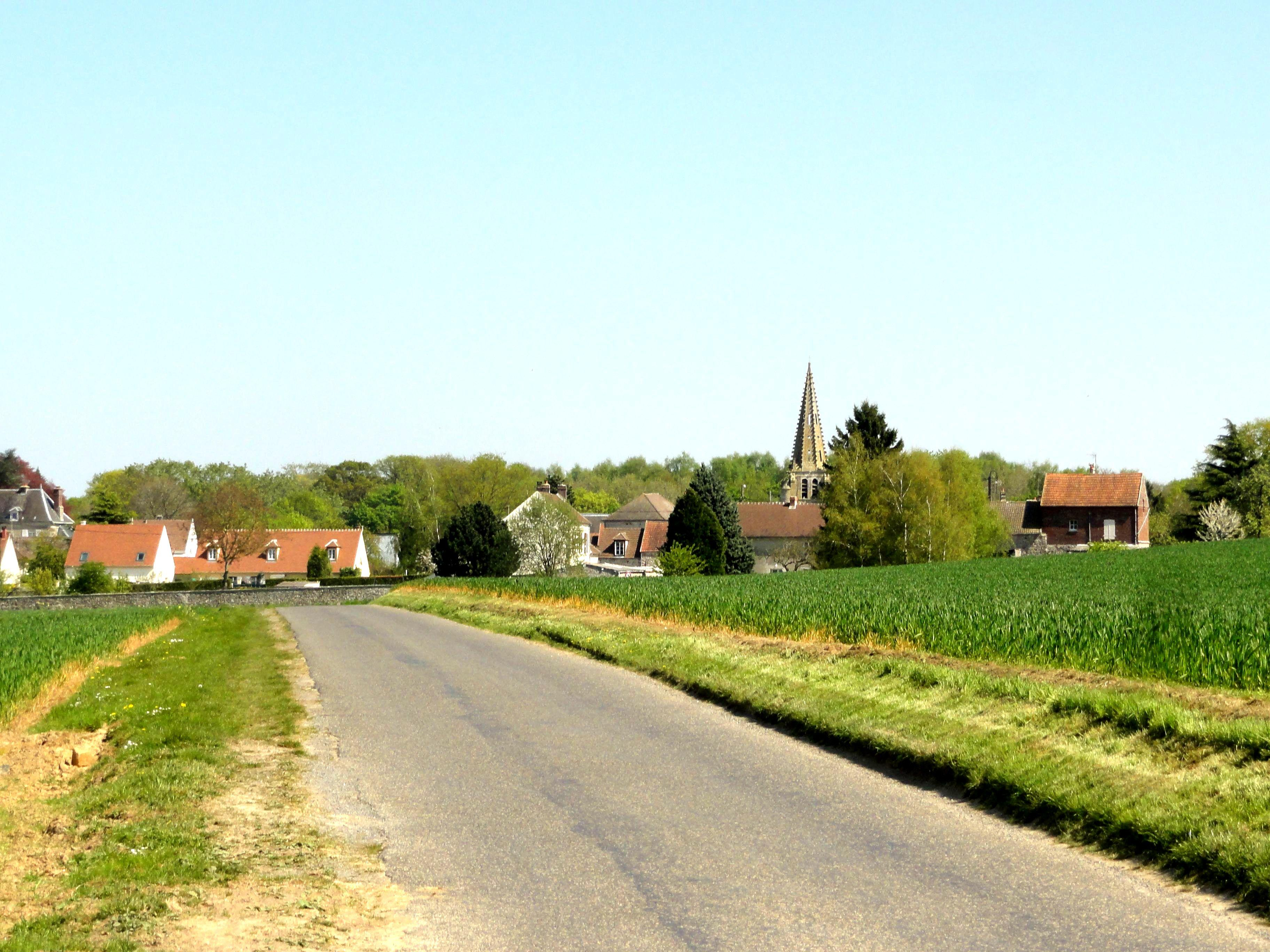
- A general view of Fresnoy-le-Luat
- Location of Fresnoy-le-Luat
- Location within France Location within Hauts-de-France
- Coordinates: 49°12′42″N 2°46′10″E
- Country: France
- Region: Hauts-de-France
- Department: Oise
- Arrondissement: Senlis
- Canton: Nanteuil-le-Haudouin
- Intercommunality: Pays de Valois

Government
  - Mayor (2020–2026): Stéphane Peters
- Area^{1}: 11.5 km^{2} (4.4 sq mi)
- Elevation: 147 m (482 ft)
- Highest elevation: 148 m (486 ft)
- Lowest elevation: 86 m (282 ft)
- Population (2023): 551
  - Density: 47.9/km^{2} (124/sq mi)
- Time zone: UTC+01:00 (CET)
  - Summer (DST): UTC+02:00 (CEST)
- INSEE/Postal code: 60261 /60800
- ^{1} French Land Register data, which excludes lakes, ponds, glaciers > 1 km^{2} (0.386 sq mi or 247 acres) and river estuaries.

Fresnoy-le-Luat (French pronunciation: [fʁɛnwa lə lɥa]) is a commune in the Oise department in northern France.

== See also ==
- Communes of the Oise department
