= Villers-Saint-Genest =

- Commune
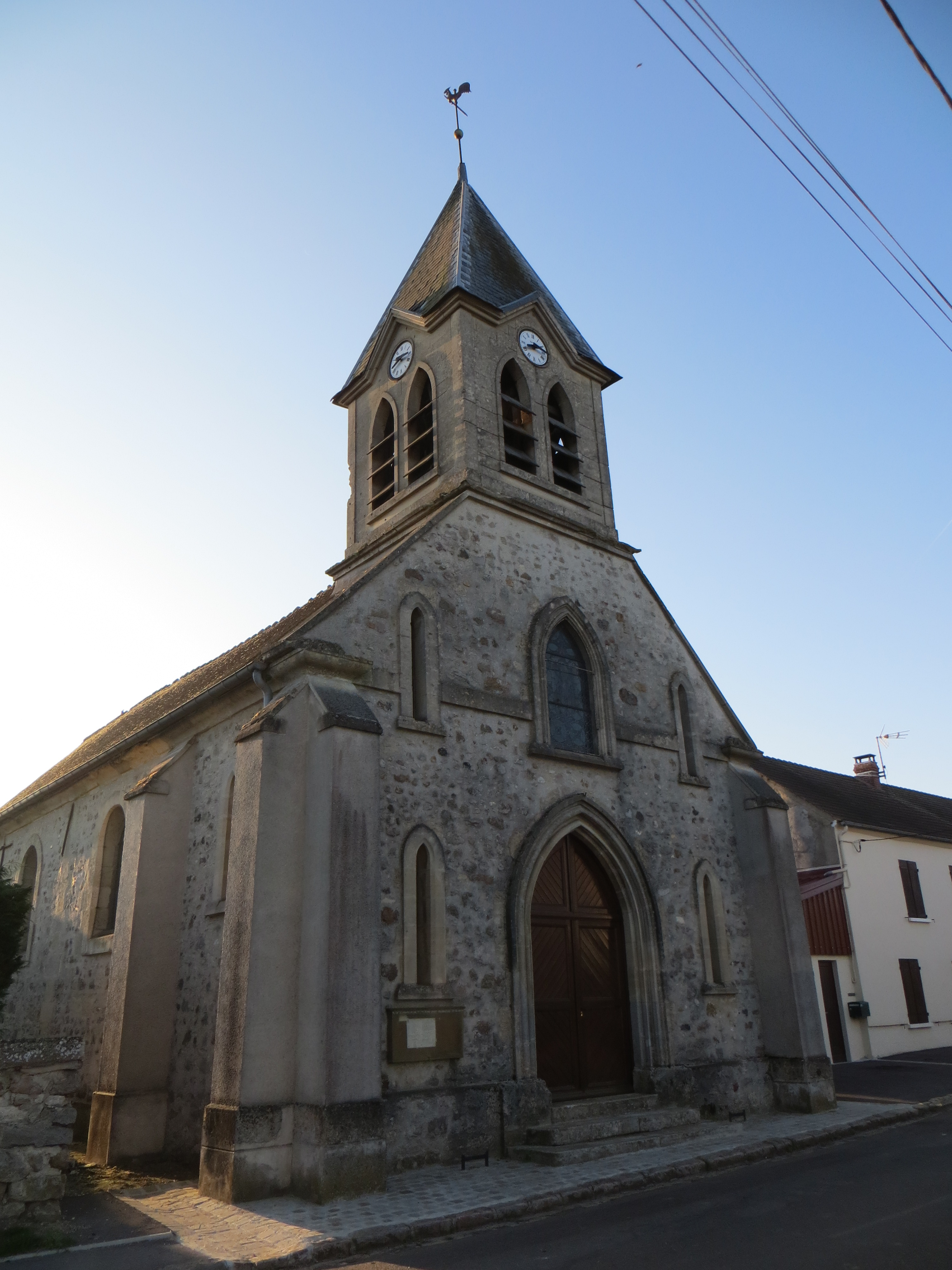
- The church in Villers-Saint-Genest
- Location of Villers-Saint-Genest
- Location within France Location within Hauts-de-France
- Coordinates: 49°08′35″N 2°54′24″E
- Country: France
- Region: Hauts-de-France
- Department: Oise
- Arrondissement: Senlis
- Canton: Nanteuil-le-Haudouin
- Intercommunality: Pays de Valois

Government
  - Mayor (2020–2026): Thierry Tavernier
- Area^{1}: 9.66 km^{2} (3.73 sq mi)
- Elevation: 120 m (390 ft)
- Highest elevation: 135 m (443 ft)
- Lowest elevation: 120 m (390 ft)
- Population (2023): 386
  - Density: 40.0/km^{2} (103/sq mi)
- Time zone: UTC+01:00 (CET)
  - Summer (DST): UTC+02:00 (CEST)
- INSEE/Postal code: 60683 /60620
- ^{1} French Land Register data, which excludes lakes, ponds, glaciers > 1 km^{2} (0.386 sq mi or 247 acres) and river estuaries.

Villers-Saint-Genest (French pronunciation: [vilɛʁ sɛ̃ ʒənɛ]) is a commune in the Oise department in northern France.

== See also ==
- Communes of the Oise department
