= Silly-le-Long =

- Commune
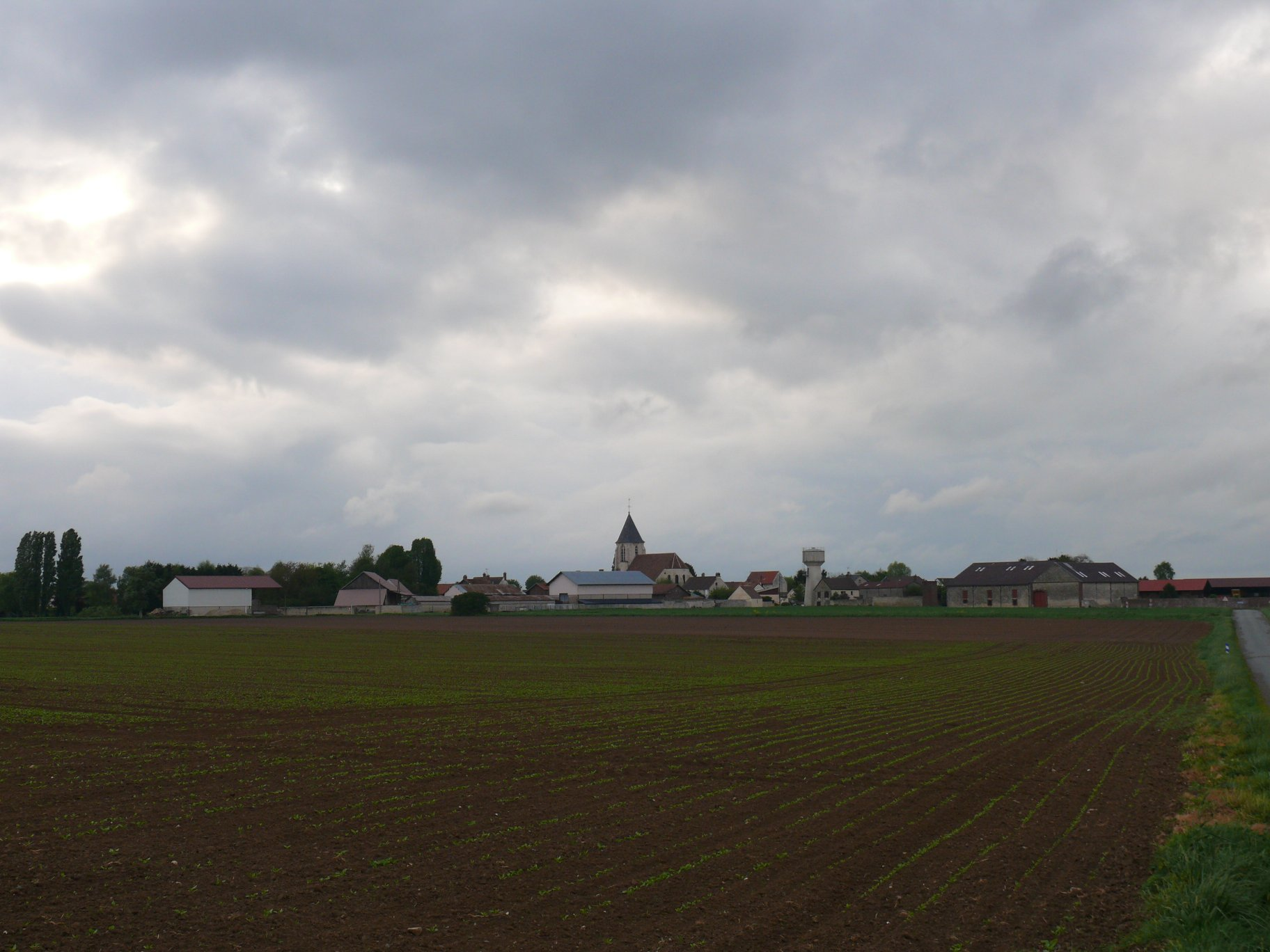
- A general view of Silly-le-Long
- Location of Silly-le-Long
- Location within France Location within Hauts-de-France
- Coordinates: 49°06′28″N 2°47′33″E
- Country: France
- Region: Hauts-de-France
- Department: Oise
- Arrondissement: Senlis
- Canton: Nanteuil-le-Haudouin
- Intercommunality: Pays de Valois

Government
  - Mayor (2020–2026): Daniel Lefranc
- Area^{1}: 11.35 km^{2} (4.38 sq mi)
- Elevation: 116 m (381 ft)
- Highest elevation: 127 m (417 ft)
- Lowest elevation: 98 m (322 ft)
- Population (2023): 1,217
  - Density: 107.2/km^{2} (277.7/sq mi)
- Time zone: UTC+01:00 (CET)
  - Summer (DST): UTC+02:00 (CEST)
- INSEE/Postal code: 60619 /60330
- ^{1} French Land Register data, which excludes lakes, ponds, glaciers > 1 km^{2} (0.386 sq mi or 247 acres) and river estuaries.

Silly-le-Long (French pronunciation: [siji lə lɔ̃]) is a commune in the Oise department in northern France.

== See also ==
- Communes of the Oise department
