= Rouvres-en-Multien =

- Commune
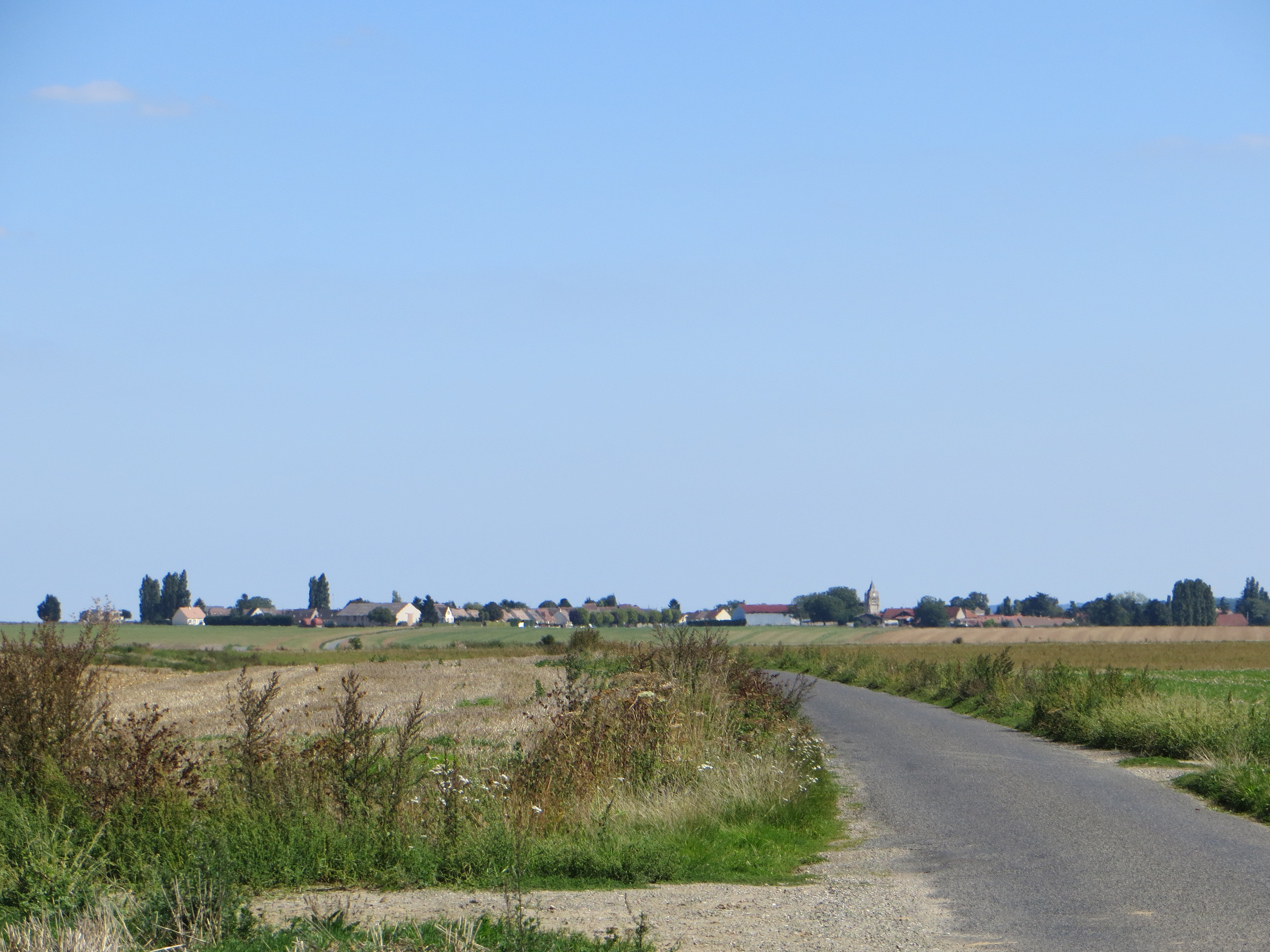
- A general view of Rouvres-en-Multien
- Location of Rouvres-en-Multien
- Location within France Location within Hauts-de-France
- Coordinates: 49°06′41″N 3°01′29″E
- Country: France
- Region: Hauts-de-France
- Department: Oise
- Arrondissement: Senlis
- Canton: Nanteuil-le-Haudouin
- Intercommunality: Pays de Valois

Government
  - Mayor (2020–2026): Jean-Luc Legris
- Area^{1}: 8.12 km^{2} (3.14 sq mi)
- Elevation: 141 m (463 ft)
- Highest elevation: 152 m (499 ft)
- Lowest elevation: 62 m (203 ft)
- Population (2023): 471
  - Density: 58.0/km^{2} (150/sq mi)
- Time zone: UTC+01:00 (CET)
  - Summer (DST): UTC+02:00 (CEST)
- INSEE/Postal code: 60554 /60620
- ^{1} French Land Register data, which excludes lakes, ponds, glaciers > 1 km^{2} (0.386 sq mi or 247 acres) and river estuaries.

Rouvres-en-Multien (French pronunciation: [ʁuvʁ ɑ̃ myltjɛ̃], lit. 'Rouvres in Multien'; before 1993: Rouvres) is a commune in the Oise department in northern France. As of 2023, the population of the commune was 471.

== See also ==
- Communes of the Oise department
