= Ver-sur-Launette =

- Commune
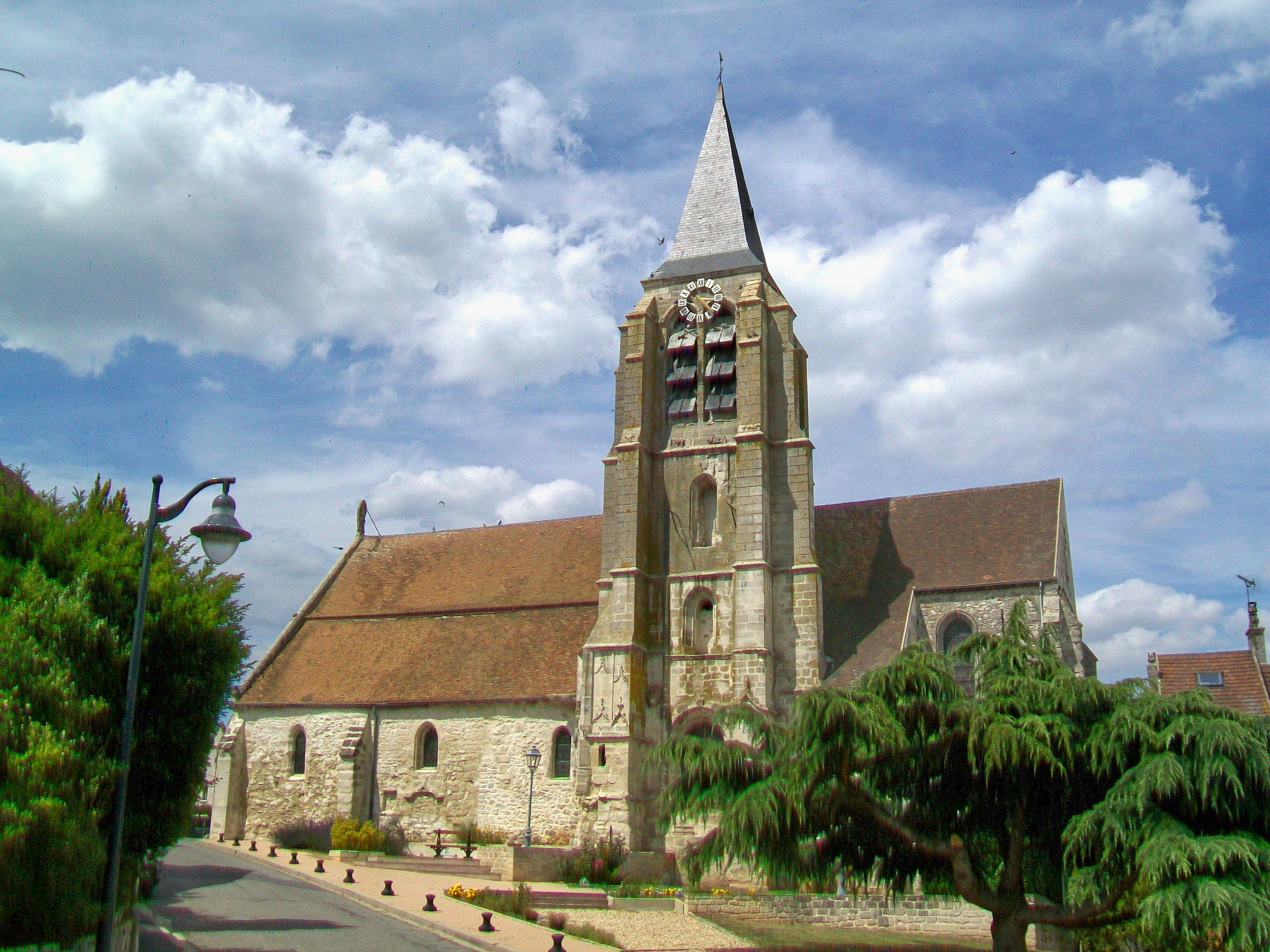
- The church of Saint-Denis in Ver-sur-Launette
- Location of Ver-sur-Launette
- Location within France Location within Hauts-de-France
- Coordinates: 49°06′20″N 2°41′10″E
- Country: France
- Region: Hauts-de-France
- Department: Oise
- Arrondissement: Senlis
- Canton: Nanteuil-le-Haudouin
- Intercommunality: Pays de Valois

Government
  - Mayor (2020–2026): Betty Coëlle
- Area^{1}: 13.18 km^{2} (5.09 sq mi)
- Elevation: 80 m (260 ft)
- Highest elevation: 116 m (381 ft)
- Lowest elevation: 79 m (259 ft)
- Population (2023): 1,130
  - Density: 85.7/km^{2} (222/sq mi)
- Time zone: UTC+01:00 (CET)
  - Summer (DST): UTC+02:00 (CEST)
- INSEE/Postal code: 60666 /60950
- ^{1} French Land Register data, which excludes lakes, ponds, glaciers > 1 km^{2} (0.386 sq mi or 247 acres) and river estuaries.

Ver-sur-Launette (French pronunciation: [vɛʁ syʁ lonɛt]) is a commune in the Oise department in northern France.

== See also ==
- Communes of the Oise department
