= Brégy =

- Commune
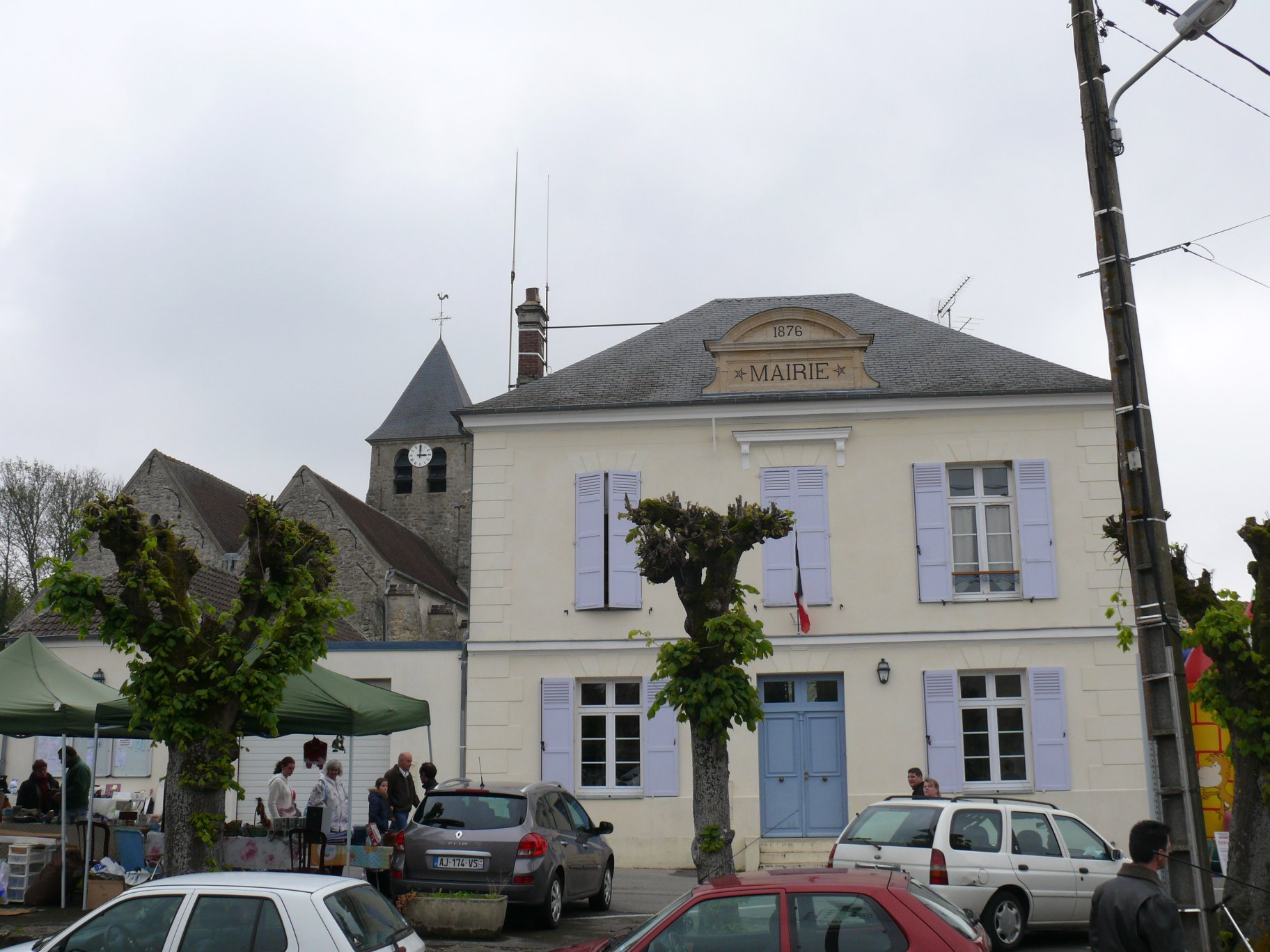
- The town hall in Brégy
- Location of Brégy
- Location within France Location within Hauts-de-France
- Coordinates: 49°05′00″N 2°51′57″E
- Country: France
- Region: Hauts-de-France
- Department: Oise
- Arrondissement: Senlis
- Canton: Nanteuil-le-Haudouin
- Intercommunality: Pays de Valois

Government
  - Mayor (2022–2026): Georges Moreira
- Area^{1}: 13.17 km^{2} (5.08 sq mi)
- Elevation: 100 m (330 ft)
- Highest elevation: 134 m (440 ft)
- Lowest elevation: 86 m (282 ft)
- Population (2023): 627
  - Density: 47.6/km^{2} (123/sq mi)
- Time zone: UTC+01:00 (CET)
  - Summer (DST): UTC+02:00 (CEST)
- INSEE/Postal code: 60101 /60440
- ^{1} French Land Register data, which excludes lakes, ponds, glaciers > 1 km^{2} (0.386 sq mi or 247 acres) and river estuaries.

Brégy (French pronunciation: [bʁeʒi]) is a commune in the Oise department in the Picardy region, located in northern France . Its territory covers 1,317 hectares. It has two public water and sanitation services and one municipality.

== Population ==
Historical population
Year	Pop.	±% p.a.
1968	436	—
1975	422	−0.47%
1982	421	−0.03%
1990	461	+1.14%
1999	483	+0.52%
2007	560	+1.87%
2012	588	+0.98%
2017	636	+1.58%
2023	627	−0.24%
Source: INSEE

== Geographic location ==
Brégy covers an area of 13.2 km², which is smaller than the average city area of 17.5 km². Its minimum altitude is 86 meters, while the average minimum altitude of cities is 194 meters. The maximum altitude in Brégy is 134 meters, compared to the average maximum altitude of 395 meters. The latitude of Brégy is 49.0896, and its longitude is 2.87414.

== Local economy ==
Brégy has a notable number of business owners, artistians, and farmers. Its economy revolves around local services, small enterprises, and agriculture.

== See also ==
- Communes of the Oise department
