= Chèvreville, Oise =

Chèvreville
- Commune
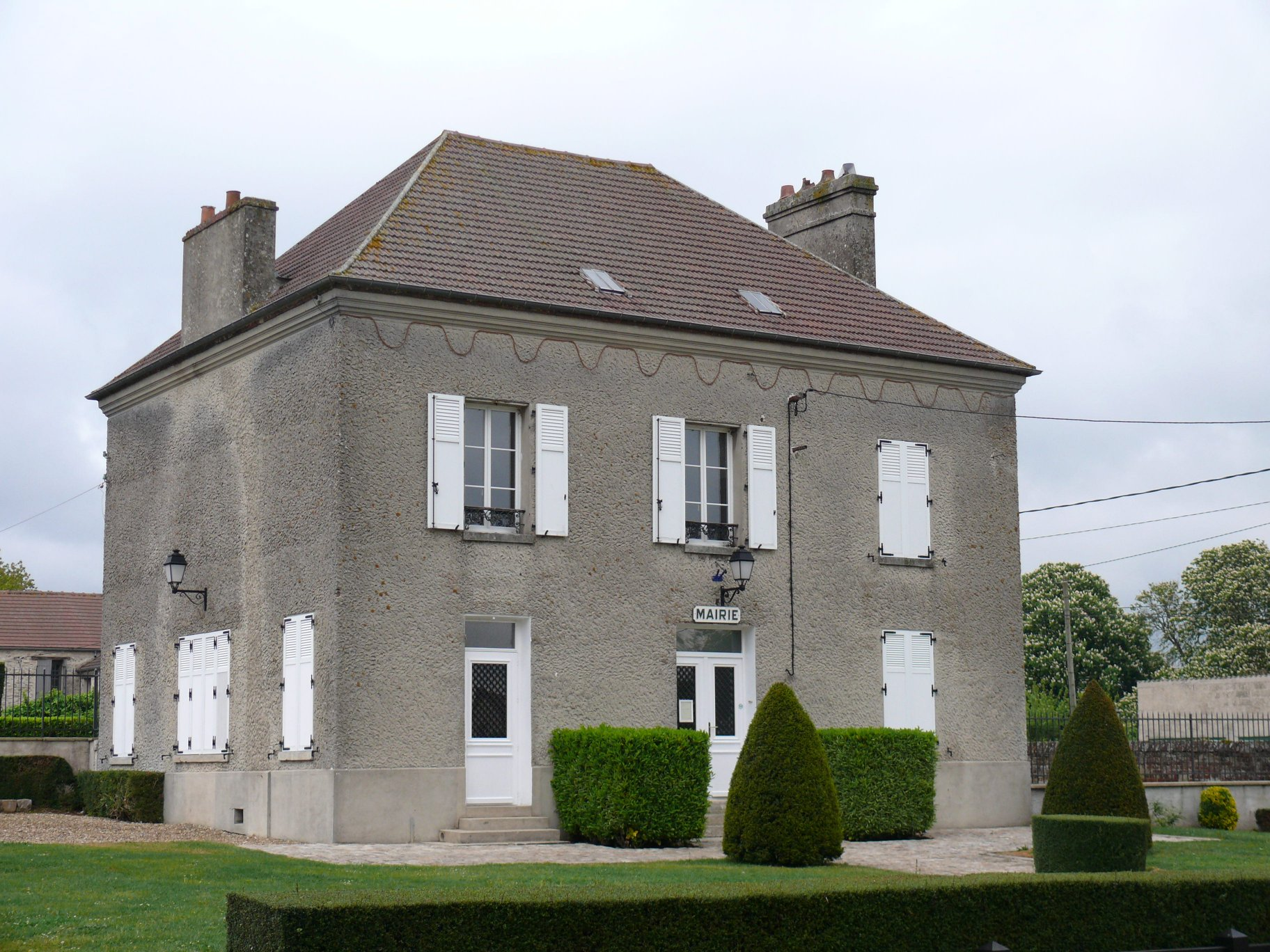
- The town hall in Chèvreville
- Location of Chèvreville
- Location within France Location within Hauts-de-France
- Coordinates: 49°06′38″N 2°51′01″E
- Country: France
- Region: Hauts-de-France
- Department: Oise
- Arrondissement: Senlis
- Canton: Nanteuil-le-Haudouin
- Intercommunality: Pays de Valois

Government
  - Mayor (2020–2026): Jean-Paul Rychtarik
- Area^{1}: 10.34 km^{2} (3.99 sq mi)
- Elevation: 118 m (387 ft)
- Highest elevation: 134 m (440 ft)
- Lowest elevation: 115 m (377 ft)
- Population (2023): 399
  - Density: 38.6/km^{2} (99.9/sq mi)
- Time zone: UTC+01:00 (CET)
  - Summer (DST): UTC+02:00 (CEST)
- INSEE/Postal code: 60148 /60440
- ^{1} French Land Register data, which excludes lakes, ponds, glaciers > 1 km^{2} (0.386 sq mi or 247 acres) and river estuaries.

Chèvreville (French pronunciation: [ʃɛvʁəvil]) is a commune in the Oise department in northern France.

== See also ==
- Communes of the Oise department
