= Ormoy-le-Davien =

- Commune
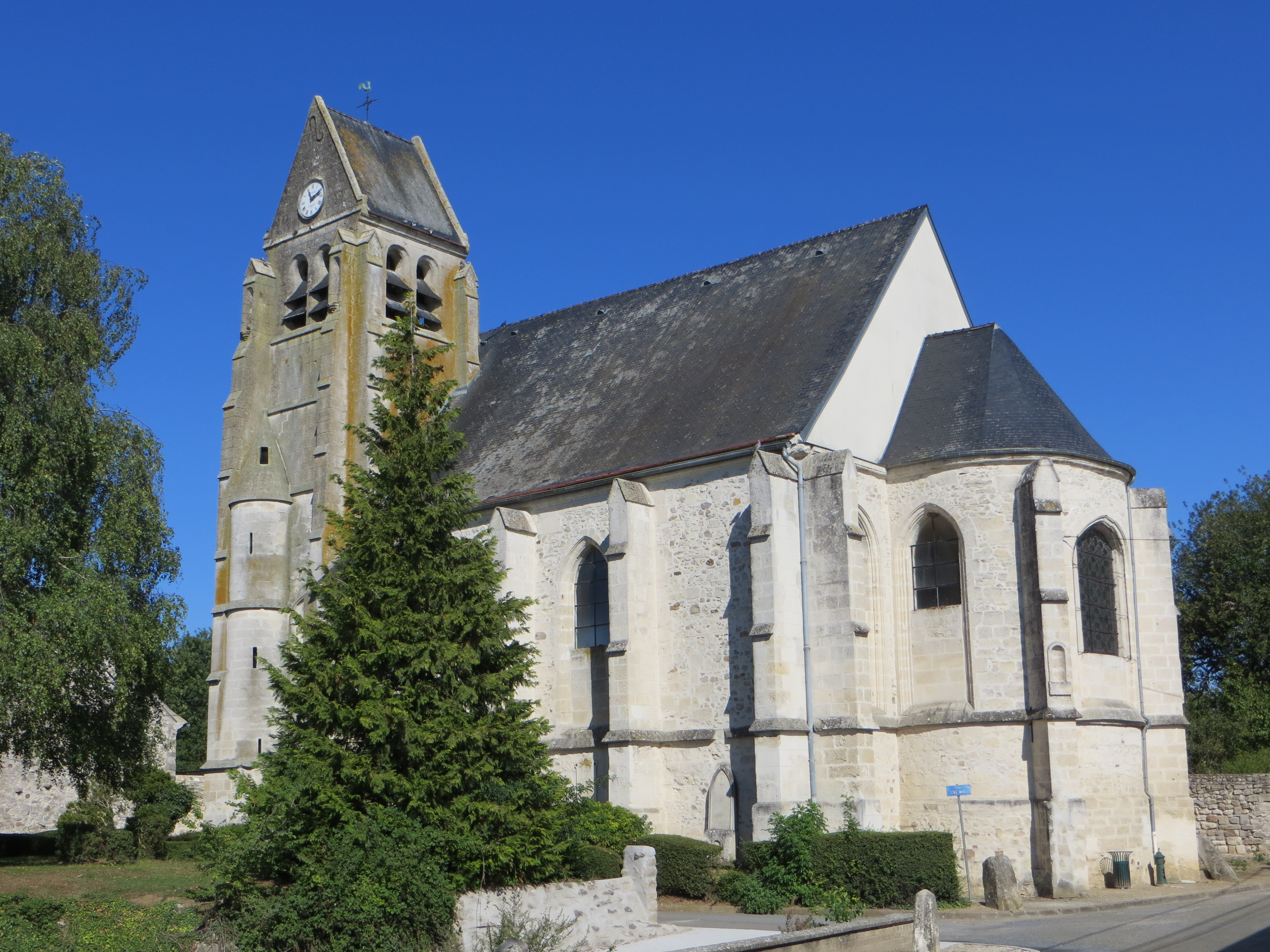
- The church in Ormoy-le-Davien
- Location of Ormoy-le-Davien
- Location within France Location within Hauts-de-France
- Coordinates: 49°11′46″N 2°57′35″E
- Country: France
- Region: Hauts-de-France
- Department: Oise
- Arrondissement: Senlis
- Canton: Nanteuil-le-Haudouin
- Intercommunality: Pays de Valois

Government
  - Mayor (2020–2026): Jean-Marie Salsat
- Area^{1}: 3.95 km^{2} (1.53 sq mi)
- Elevation: 135 m (443 ft)
- Highest elevation: 143 m (469 ft)
- Lowest elevation: 126 m (413 ft)
- Population (2023): 375
  - Density: 94.9/km^{2} (246/sq mi)
- Time zone: UTC+01:00 (CET)
  - Summer (DST): UTC+02:00 (CEST)
- INSEE/Postal code: 60478 /60620
- ^{1} French Land Register data, which excludes lakes, ponds, glaciers > 1 km^{2} (0.386 sq mi or 247 acres) and river estuaries.

Ormoy-le-Davien (French pronunciation: [ɔʁmwa lə davjɛ̃]) is a commune in the Oise department in northern France.

== See also ==
- Communes of the Oise department
