= Canton of Nanteuil-le-Haudouin =

Canton of France

Coordinates: 49.14°N 2.81°E

- Canton
- Situation of the canton of Nanteuil-le-Haudouin in the department of Oise
- Country: France
- Region: Hauts-de-France
- Department: Oise
- No. of communes: {{{nbcomm}}}
- Population (2023): 32,816
- INSEE code: 6015

The canton of Nanteuil-le-Haudouin is an administrative division of the Oise department, northern France. Its borders were modified at the French canton reorganisation which came into effect in March 2015. Its seat is in Nanteuil-le-Haudouin.

It consists of the following communes:

1. Acy-en-Multien
2. Antilly
3. Autheuil-en-Valois
4. Bargny
5. Baron
6. Betz
7. Boissy-Fresnoy
8. Borest
9. Bouillancy
10. Boullarre
11. Boursonne
12. Brégy
13. Chèvreville
14. Cuvergnon
15. Ermenonville
16. Étavigny
17. Ève
18. Fontaine-Chaalis
19. Fresnoy-le-Luat
20. Gondreville
21. Ivors
22. Lagny-le-Sec
23. Lévignen
24. Mareuil-sur-Ourcq
25. Marolles
26. Montagny-Sainte-Félicité
27. Montlognon
28. Nanteuil-le-Haudouin
29. Neufchelles
30. Ognes
31. Ormoy-le-Davien
32. Ormoy-Villers
33. Péroy-les-Gombries
34. Le Plessis-Belleville
35. Réez-Fosse-Martin
36. Rosières
37. Rosoy-en-Multien
38. Rouville
39. Rouvres-en-Multien
40. Silly-le-Long
41. Thury-en-Valois
42. Varinfroy
43. Ver-sur-Launette
44. Versigny
45. La Villeneuve-sous-Thury
46. Villers-Saint-Genest
