= Péroy-les-Gombries =

- Commune
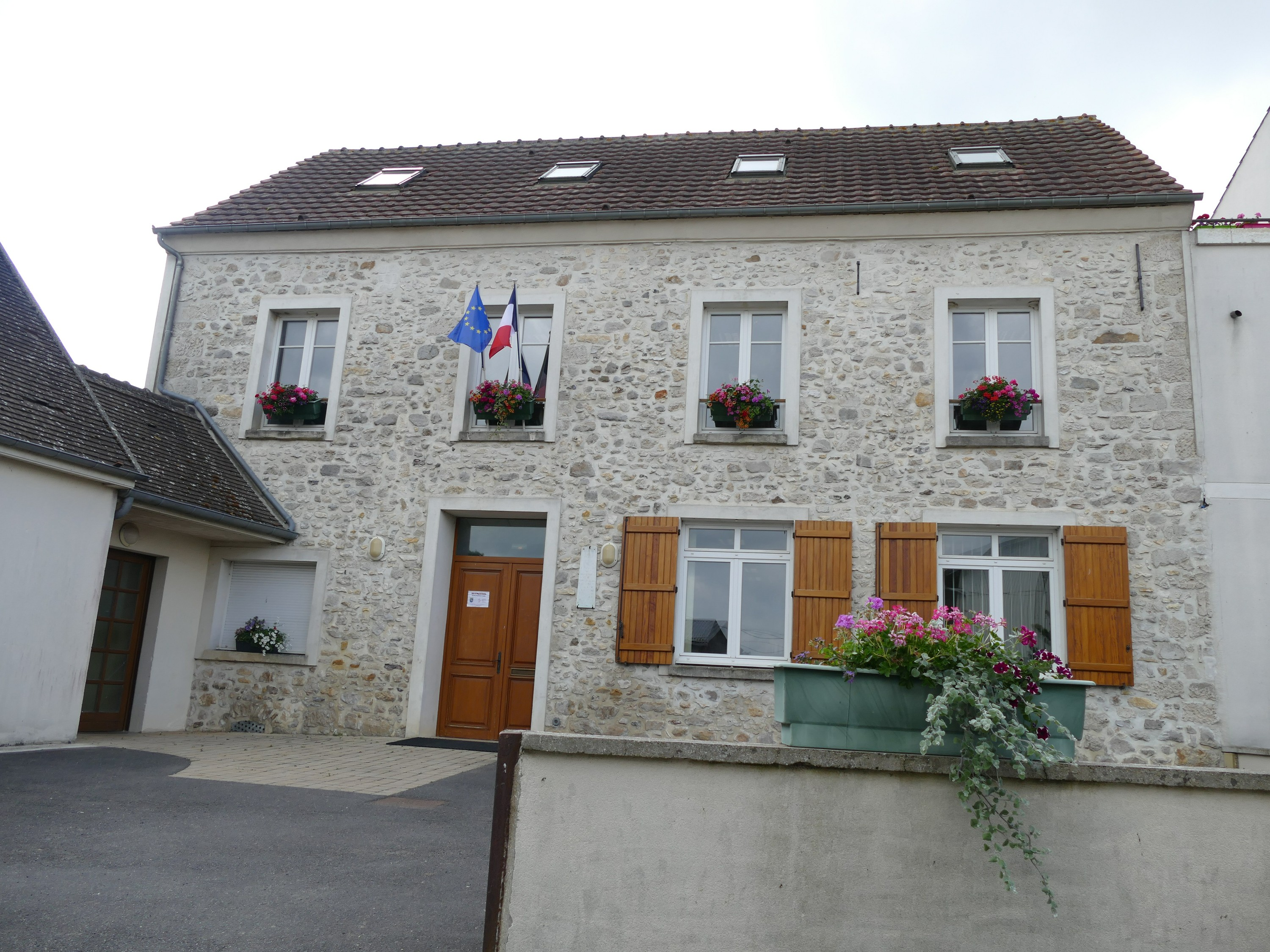
- The town hall in Péroy-les-Gombries
- Location of Péroy-les-Gombries
- Location within France Location within Hauts-de-France
- Coordinates: 49°09′46″N 2°50′43″E
- Country: France
- Region: Hauts-de-France
- Department: Oise
- Arrondissement: Senlis
- Canton: Nanteuil-le-Haudouin
- Intercommunality: Pays de Valois

Government
  - Mayor (2020–2026): Richard Kubisz
- Area^{1}: 11.21 km^{2} (4.33 sq mi)
- Elevation: 127 m (417 ft)
- Highest elevation: 135 m (443 ft)
- Lowest elevation: 97 m (318 ft)
- Population (2023): 1,224
  - Density: 109.2/km^{2} (282.8/sq mi)
- Time zone: UTC+01:00 (CET)
  - Summer (DST): UTC+02:00 (CEST)
- INSEE/Postal code: 60489 /60440
- ^{1} French Land Register data, which excludes lakes, ponds, glaciers > 1 km^{2} (0.386 sq mi or 247 acres) and river estuaries.

Péroy-les-Gombries (French pronunciation: [peʁwa le ɡɔ̃bʁi]) is a commune in the Oise department in northern France.

== See also ==
- Communes of the Oise department
