= Rosières, Oise =

Rosières
- Commune
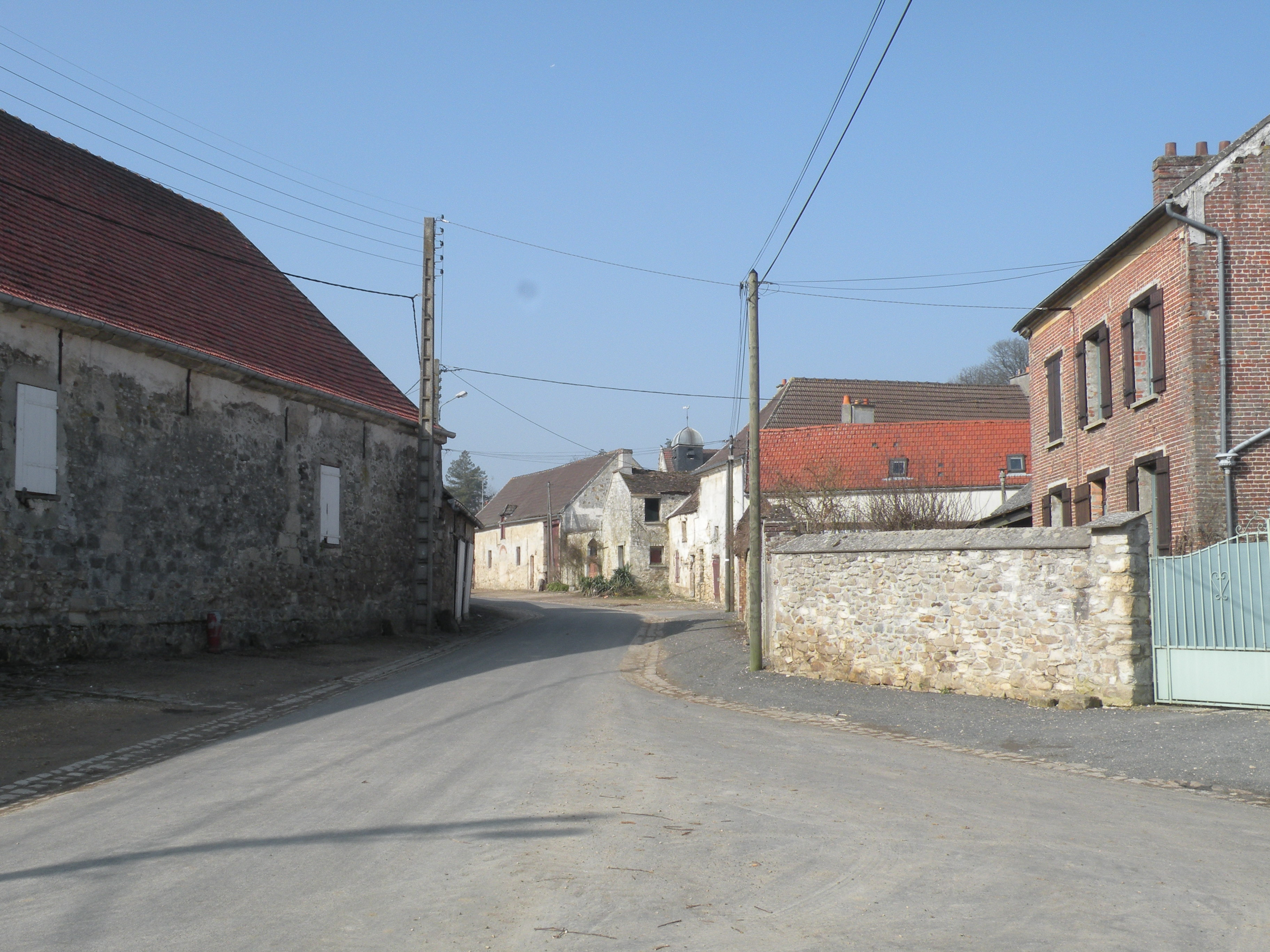
- A road in Rosières
- Location of Rosières
- Location within France Location within Hauts-de-France
- Coordinates: 49°11′21″N 2°46′45″E
- Country: France
- Region: Hauts-de-France
- Department: Oise
- Arrondissement: Senlis
- Canton: Nanteuil-le-Haudouin
- Intercommunality: Pays de Valois

Government
  - Mayor (2021–2026): Pauline Martin-Vanlerberghe
- Area^{1}: 9.27 km^{2} (3.58 sq mi)
- Elevation: 162 m (531 ft)
- Highest elevation: 162 m (531 ft)
- Lowest elevation: 83 m (272 ft)
- Population (2023): 139
  - Density: 15.0/km^{2} (38.8/sq mi)
- Time zone: UTC+01:00 (CET)
  - Summer (DST): UTC+02:00 (CEST)
- INSEE/Postal code: 60546 /60440
- ^{1} French Land Register data, which excludes lakes, ponds, glaciers > 1 km^{2} (0.386 sq mi or 247 acres) and river estuaries.

Rosières (French pronunciation: [ʁozjɛʁ]) is a commune in the Oise department in northern France.

== See also ==
- Communes of the Oise department
