= Réez-Fosse-Martin =

- Commune
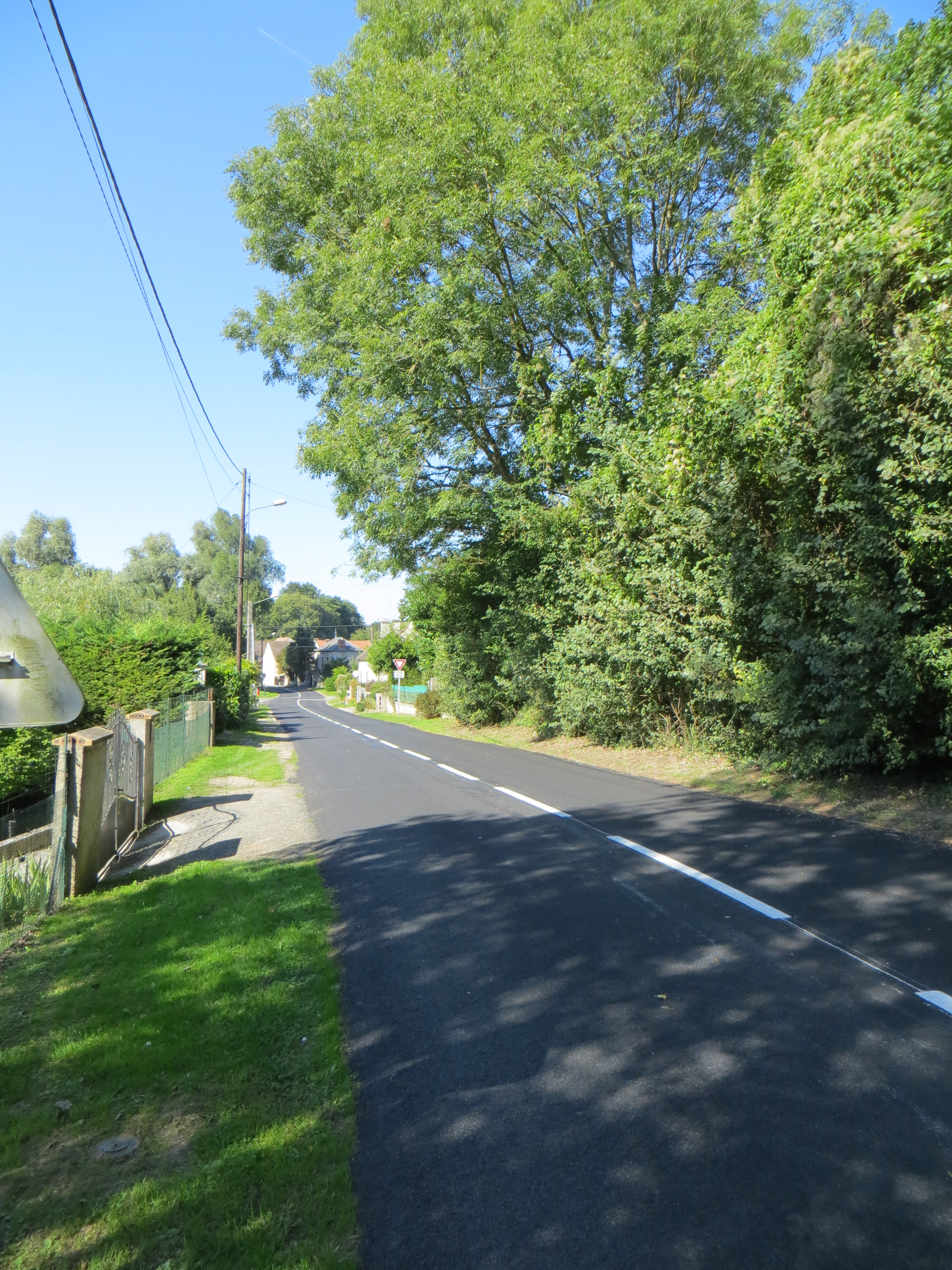
- The main road in Réez-Fosse-Martin
- Location of Réez-Fosse-Martin
- Location within France Location within Hauts-de-France
- Coordinates: 49°06′33″N 2°56′01″E
- Country: France
- Region: Hauts-de-France
- Department: Oise
- Arrondissement: Senlis
- Canton: Nanteuil-le-Haudouin
- Intercommunality: Pays de Valois

Government
  - Mayor (2020–2026): Dominique Gibert
- Area^{1}: 7.11 km^{2} (2.75 sq mi)
- Elevation: 131 m (430 ft)
- Highest elevation: 139 m (456 ft)
- Lowest elevation: 85 m (279 ft)
- Population (2023): 140
  - Density: 20/km^{2} (51/sq mi)
- Time zone: UTC+01:00 (CET)
  - Summer (DST): UTC+02:00 (CEST)
- INSEE/Postal code: 60527 /60620
- ^{1} French Land Register data, which excludes lakes, ponds, glaciers > 1 km^{2} (0.386 sq mi or 247 acres) and river estuaries.

Réez-Fosse-Martin (French pronunciation: [ʁe fos maʁtɛ̃]) is a commune in the Oise department in northern France.

== See also ==
- Communes of the Oise department
