= Varinfroy =

- Commune
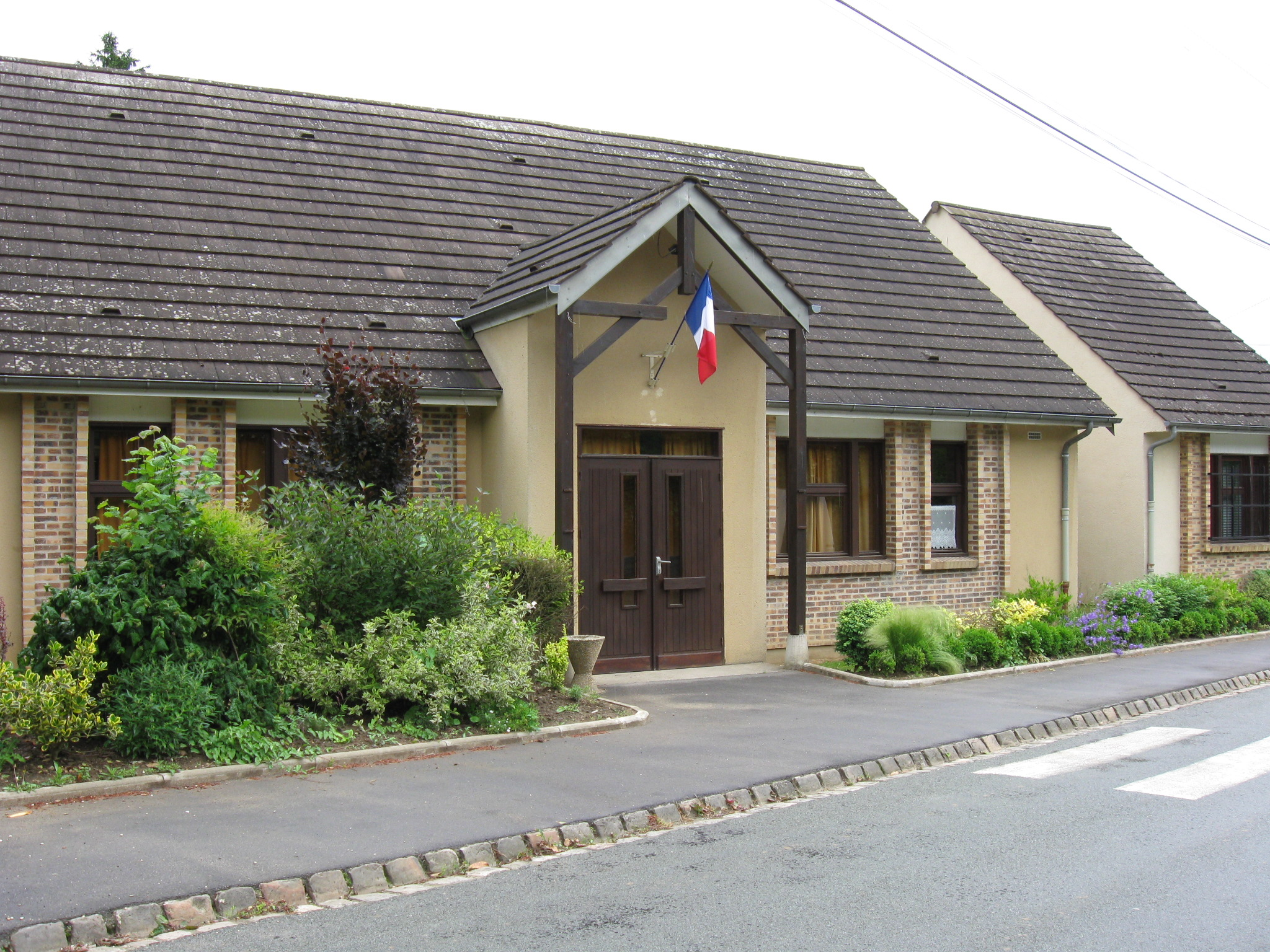
- The town hall in Varinfroy
- Location of Varinfroy
- Location within France Location within Hauts-de-France
- Coordinates: 49°05′59″N 3°02′42″E
- Country: France
- Region: Hauts-de-France
- Department: Oise
- Arrondissement: Senlis
- Canton: Nanteuil-le-Haudouin
- Intercommunality: Pays de Valois

Government
  - Mayor (2020–2026): Pascal Bonventre
- Area^{1}: 2.95 km^{2} (1.14 sq mi)
- Elevation: 74 m (243 ft)
- Highest elevation: 132 m (433 ft)
- Lowest elevation: 55 m (180 ft)
- Population (2023): 265
  - Density: 89.8/km^{2} (233/sq mi)
- Time zone: UTC+01:00 (CET)
  - Summer (DST): UTC+02:00 (CEST)
- INSEE/Postal code: 60656 /60890
- ^{1} French Land Register data, which excludes lakes, ponds, glaciers > 1 km^{2} (0.386 sq mi or 247 acres) and river estuaries.

Varinfroy (French pronunciation: [vaʁɛ̃fʁwa]) is a commune in the Oise department in northern France.

== See also ==
- Communes of the Oise department
