= Montlognon =

- Commune
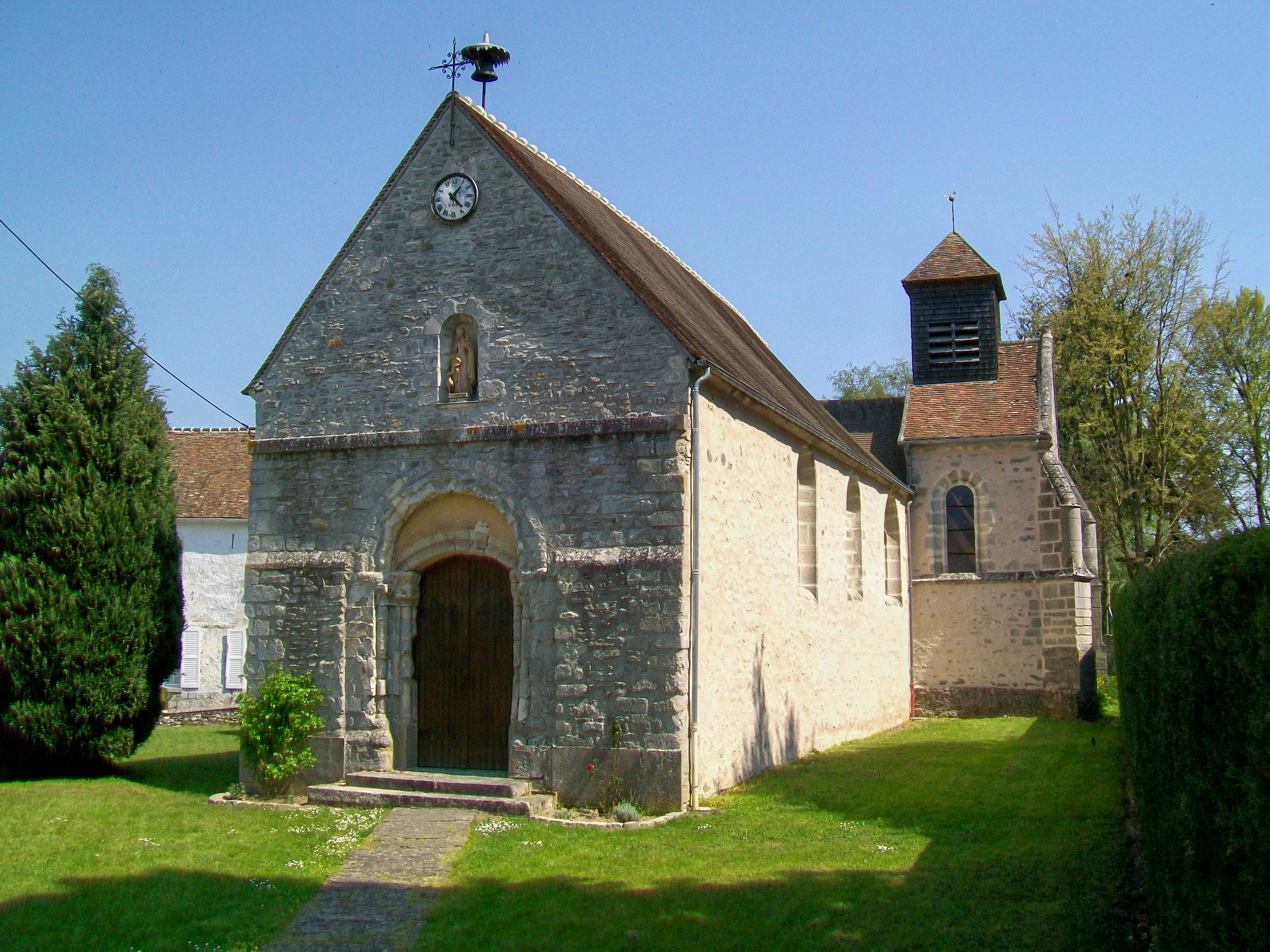
- The church in Montlognon
- Location of Montlognon
- Location within France Location within Hauts-de-France
- Coordinates: 49°09′55″N 2°41′38″E
- Country: France
- Region: Hauts-de-France
- Department: Oise
- Arrondissement: Senlis
- Canton: Nanteuil-le-Haudouin
- Intercommunality: Senlis Sud Oise

Government
  - Mayor (2020–2026): Daniel Froment
- Area^{1}: 5.24 km^{2} (2.02 sq mi)
- Elevation: 61 m (200 ft)
- Highest elevation: 122 m (400 ft)
- Lowest elevation: 62 m (203 ft)
- Population (2023): 207
  - Density: 39.5/km^{2} (102/sq mi)
- Time zone: UTC+01:00 (CET)
  - Summer (DST): UTC+02:00 (CEST)
- INSEE/Postal code: 60422 /60300
- ^{1} French Land Register data, which excludes lakes, ponds, glaciers > 1 km^{2} (0.386 sq mi or 247 acres) and river estuaries.

Montlognon (French pronunciation: [mɔ̃lɔɲɔ̃]) is a commune in the Oise department in northern France.

== See also ==
- Communes of the Oise department
