= Autheuil-en-Valois =

- Commune
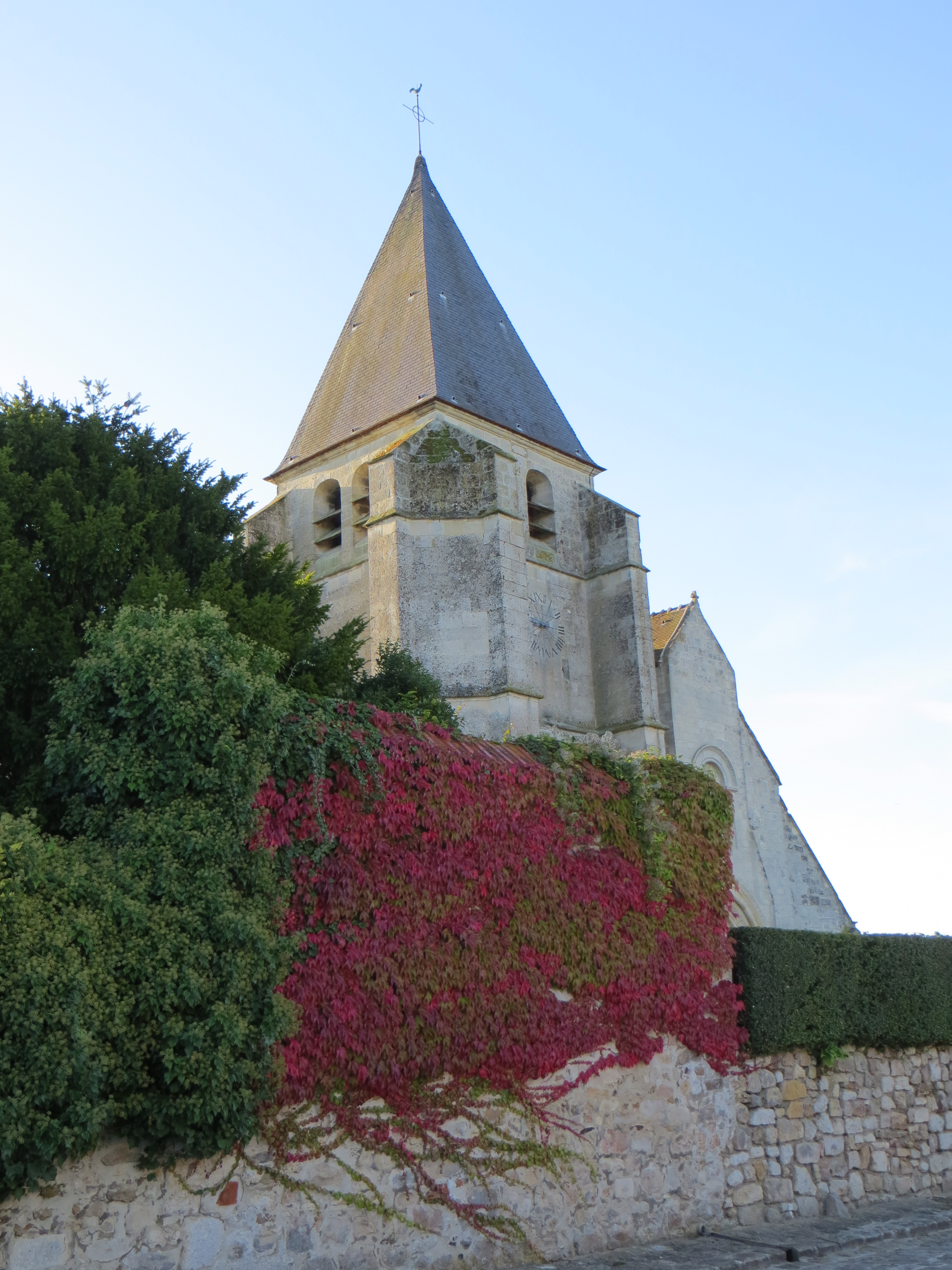
- The town hall in Autheuil-en-Valois
- Location of Autheuil-en-Valois
- Location within France Location within Hauts-de-France
- Coordinates: 49°10′22″N 3°03′41″E
- Country: France
- Region: Hauts-de-France
- Department: Oise
- Arrondissement: Senlis
- Canton: Nanteuil-le-Haudouin
- Intercommunality: CC Pays Valois

Government
  - Mayor (2020–2026): Damien Heurtaut
- Area^{1}: 9.24 km^{2} (3.57 sq mi)
- Elevation: 116 m (381 ft)
- Highest elevation: 149 m (489 ft)
- Lowest elevation: 65 m (213 ft)
- Population (2023): 265
  - Density: 28.7/km^{2} (74.3/sq mi)
- Time zone: UTC+01:00 (CET)
  - Summer (DST): UTC+02:00 (CEST)
- INSEE/Postal code: 60031 /60890
- ^{1} French Land Register data, which excludes lakes, ponds, glaciers > 1 km^{2} (0.386 sq mi or 247 acres) and river estuaries.

Autheuil-en-Valois (French pronunciation: [otœj ɑ̃ valwa], lit. 'Autheuil in Valois') is a commune in the Oise department in northern France.

== Population ==
Historical population
Year	Pop.	±% p.a.
1968	204	—
1975	166	−2.90%
1982	162	−0.35%
1990	230	+4.48%
1999	212	−0.90%
2007	258	+2.49%
2012	283	+1.87%
2017	272	−0.79%
2023	265	−0.43%
Source: INSEE

== See also ==
- Communes of the Oise department
