= Marolles, Oise =

Marolles
- Commune
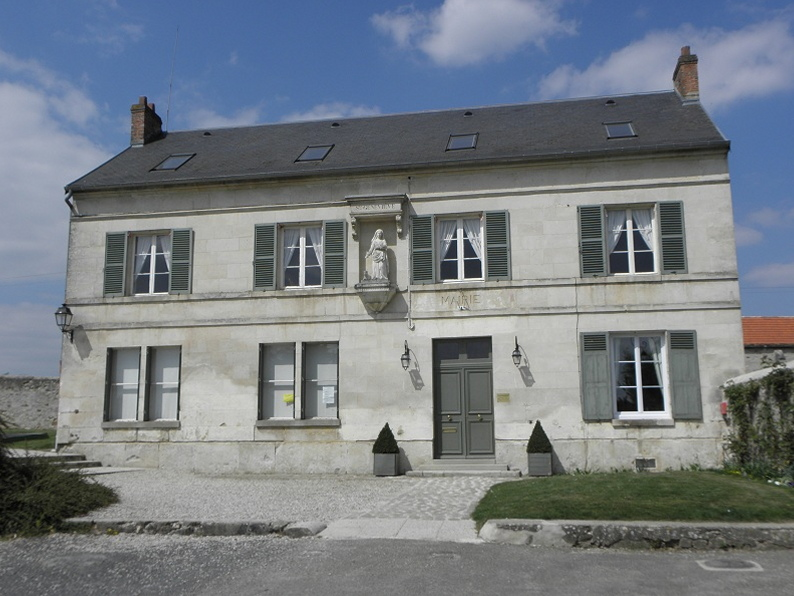
- The town hall in Marolles
- Location of Marolles
- Location within France Location within Hauts-de-France
- Coordinates: 49°10′15″N 3°06′21″E
- Country: France
- Region: Hauts-de-France
- Department: Oise
- Arrondissement: Senlis
- Canton: Nanteuil-le-Haudouin
- Intercommunality: Pays de Valois

Government
  - Mayor (2020–2026): Guy Provost
- Area^{1}: 13.22 km^{2} (5.10 sq mi)
- Elevation: 73 m (240 ft)
- Highest elevation: 151 m (495 ft)
- Lowest elevation: 62 m (203 ft)
- Population (2023): 641
  - Density: 48.5/km^{2} (126/sq mi)
- Time zone: UTC+01:00 (CET)
  - Summer (DST): UTC+02:00 (CEST)
- INSEE/Postal code: 60385 /60890
- ^{1} French Land Register data, which excludes lakes, ponds, glaciers > 1 km^{2} (0.386 sq mi or 247 acres) and river estuaries.

Marolles (French pronunciation: [maʁɔl]) is a commune in the Oise department in northern France.

== See also ==
- Communes of the Oise department
