= Cuvergnon =

- Commune
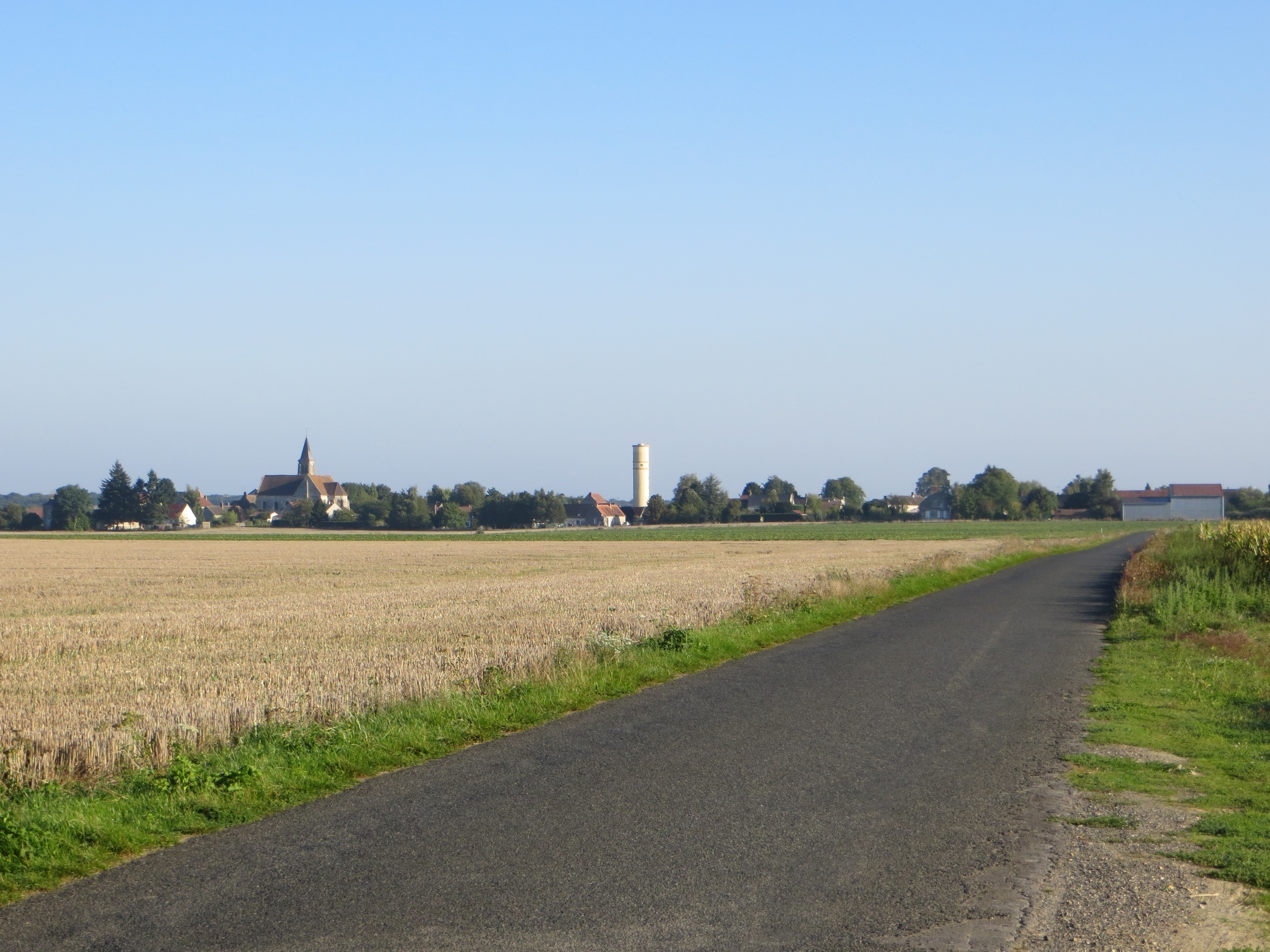
- A general view of Cuvergnon
- Location of Cuvergnon
- Location within France Location within Hauts-de-France
- Coordinates: 49°10′28″N 2°59′24″E
- Country: France
- Region: Hauts-de-France
- Department: Oise
- Arrondissement: Senlis
- Canton: Nanteuil-le-Haudouin
- Intercommunality: Pays de Valois

Government
  - Mayor (2020–2026): Yann Leyris
- Area^{1}: 7.33 km^{2} (2.83 sq mi)
- Elevation: 132 m (433 ft)
- Highest elevation: 141 m (463 ft)
- Lowest elevation: 97 m (318 ft)
- Population (2023): 323
  - Density: 44.1/km^{2} (114/sq mi)
- Time zone: UTC+01:00 (CET)
  - Summer (DST): UTC+02:00 (CEST)
- INSEE/Postal code: 60190 /60620
- ^{1} French Land Register data, which excludes lakes, ponds, glaciers > 1 km^{2} (0.386 sq mi or 247 acres) and river estuaries.

Cuvergnon (French pronunciation: [kyvɛʁɲɔ̃]) is a commune in the Oise department, Hauts-de-France, northern France.

== See also ==
- Communes of the Oise department
