= Boullarre =

- Commune
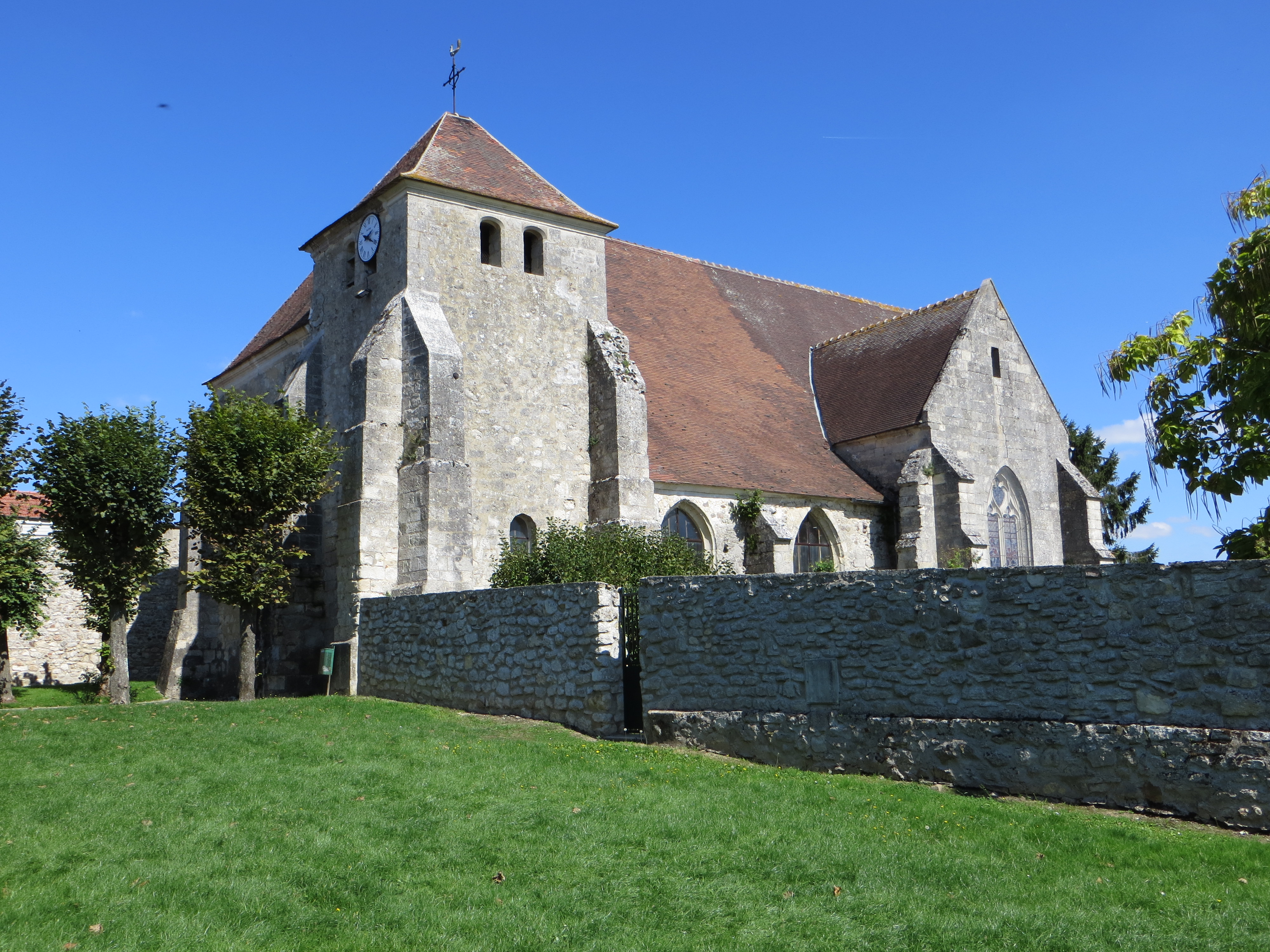
- The church in Boullarre
- Location of Boullarre
- Location within France Location within Hauts-de-France
- Coordinates: 49°07′54″N 3°00′17″E
- Country: France
- Region: Hauts-de-France
- Department: Oise
- Arrondissement: Senlis
- Canton: Nanteuil-le-Haudouin
- Intercommunality: Pays de Valois

Government
  - Mayor (2020–2026): Joël Goniaux
- Area^{1}: 7.58 km^{2} (2.93 sq mi)
- Elevation: 122 m (400 ft)
- Highest elevation: 148 m (486 ft)
- Lowest elevation: 66 m (217 ft)
- Population (2023): 194
  - Density: 25.6/km^{2} (66.3/sq mi)
- Time zone: UTC+01:00 (CET)
  - Summer (DST): UTC+02:00 (CEST)
- INSEE/Postal code: 60092 /60620
- ^{1} French Land Register data, which excludes lakes, ponds, glaciers > 1 km^{2} (0.386 sq mi or 247 acres) and river estuaries.

Boullarre (French pronunciation: [bulaʁ]) is a commune in the Oise department in northern France.

== Population ==
Historical population
Year	Pop.	±% p.a.
1968	129	—
1975	168	+3.85%
1982	169	+0.08%
1990	222	+3.47%
1999	225	+0.15%
2007	227	+0.11%
2012	225	−0.18%
2017	223	−0.18%
2023	194	−2.30%
Source: INSEE

== See also ==
- Communes of the Oise department
