= Bouillancy =

- Commune
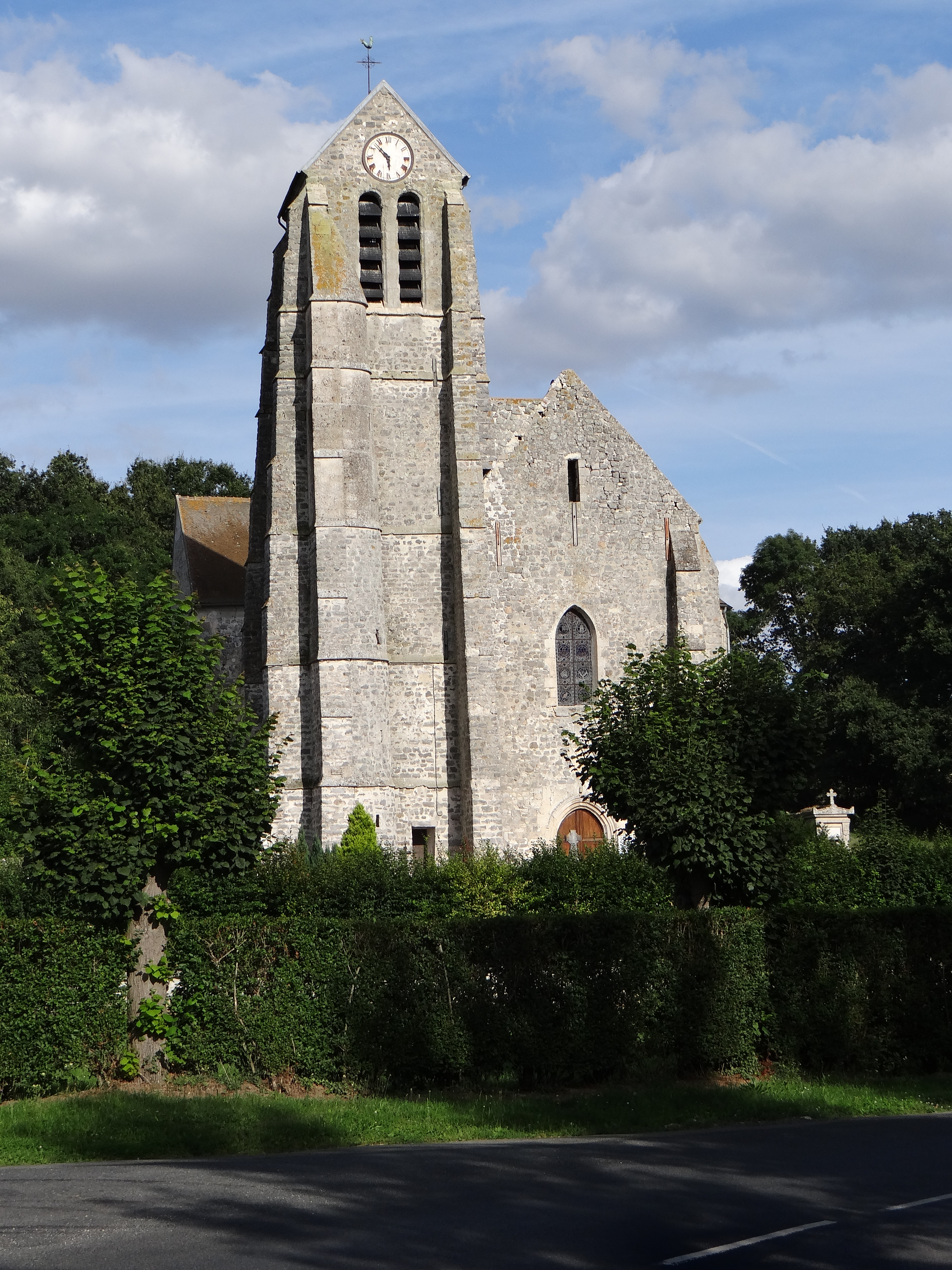
- The church in Bouillancy

- Coat of arms
- Location of Bouillancy
- Location within France Location within Hauts-de-France
- Coordinates: 49°06′48″N 2°55′06″E
- Country: France
- Region: Hauts-de-France
- Department: Oise
- Arrondissement: Senlis
- Canton: Nanteuil-le-Haudouin
- Intercommunality: Pays de Valois

Government
  - Mayor (2020–2026): Yann Delobelle
- Area^{1}: 13.59 km^{2} (5.25 sq mi)
- Elevation: 128 m (420 ft)
- Highest elevation: 137 m (449 ft)
- Lowest elevation: 90 m (300 ft)
- Population (2023): 429
  - Density: 31.6/km^{2} (81.8/sq mi)
- Time zone: UTC+01:00 (CET)
  - Summer (DST): UTC+02:00 (CEST)
- INSEE/Postal code: 60091 /60620
- ^{1} French Land Register data, which excludes lakes, ponds, glaciers > 1 km^{2} (0.386 sq mi or 247 acres) and river estuaries.

Bouillancy (French pronunciation: [bujɑ̃si]) is a commune in the Oise department in northern France.

== Population ==
Historical population
Year	Pop.	±% p.a.
1968	275	—
1975	229	−2.58%
1982	279	+2.86%
1990	354	+3.02%
1999	360	+0.19%
2007	387	+0.91%
2012	365	−1.16%
2017	382	+0.91%
2023	429	+1.95%
Source: INSEE

== See also ==
- Communes of the Oise department
