= Étavigny =

- Commune
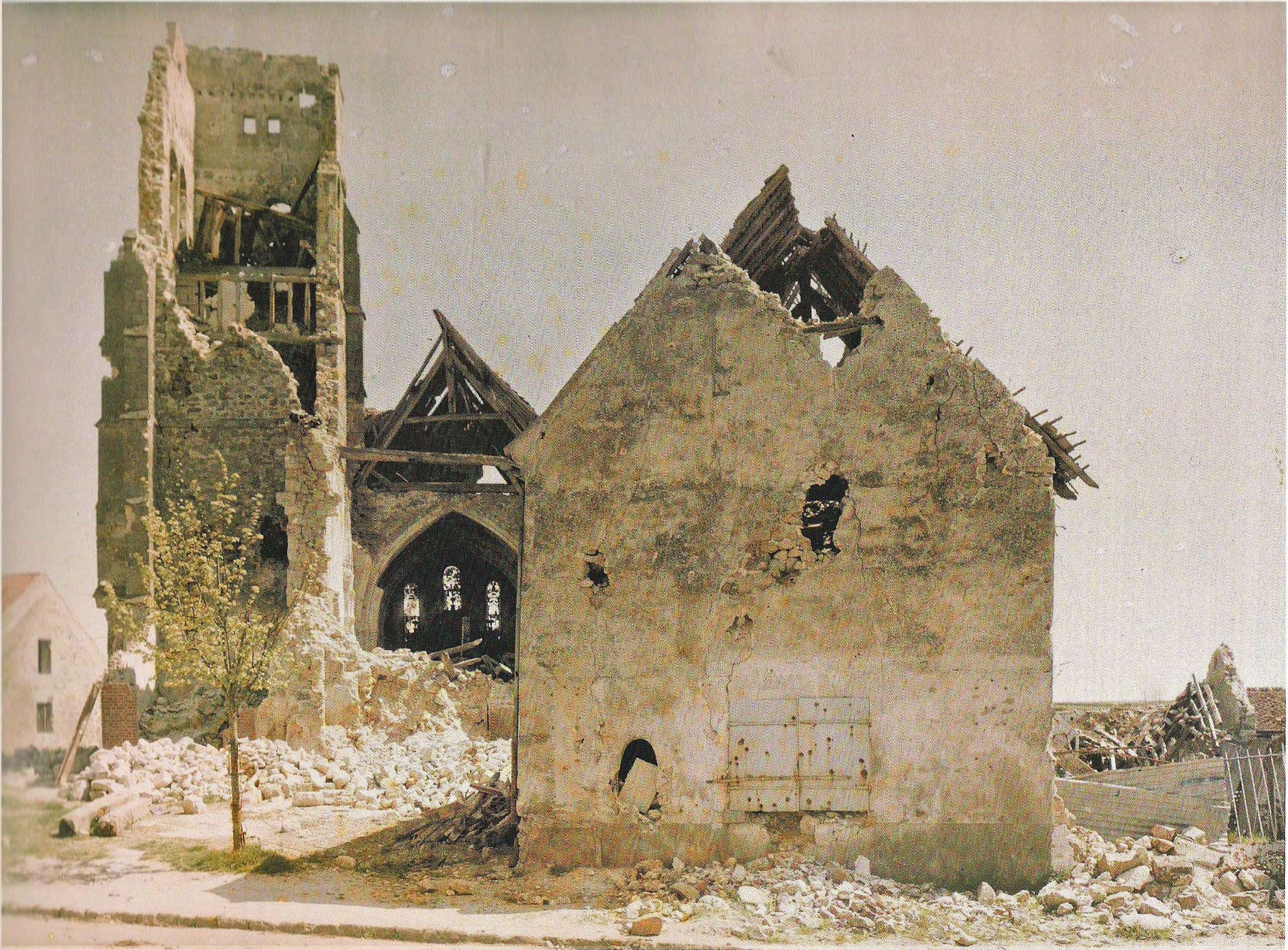
- The church in 1915
- Location of Étavigny
- Location within France Location within Hauts-de-France
- Coordinates: 49°07′15″N 2°58′47″E
- Country: France
- Region: Hauts-de-France
- Department: Oise
- Arrondissement: Senlis
- Canton: Nanteuil-le-Haudouin
- Intercommunality: Pays de Valois

Government
  - Mayor (2020–2026): Thibaud Demory
- Area^{1}: 7.17 km^{2} (2.77 sq mi)
- Elevation: 134 m (440 ft)
- Highest elevation: 145 m (476 ft)
- Lowest elevation: 78 m (256 ft)
- Population (2023): 180
  - Density: 25/km^{2} (65/sq mi)
- Time zone: UTC+01:00 (CET)
  - Summer (DST): UTC+02:00 (CEST)
- INSEE/Postal code: 60224 /60620
- ^{1} French Land Register data, which excludes lakes, ponds, glaciers > 1 km^{2} (0.386 sq mi or 247 acres) and river estuaries.

Étavigny (French pronunciation: [etaviɲi]) is a commune in the Oise department in northern France.

== See also ==
- Communes of the Oise department
