= Boissy-Fresnoy =

- Commune
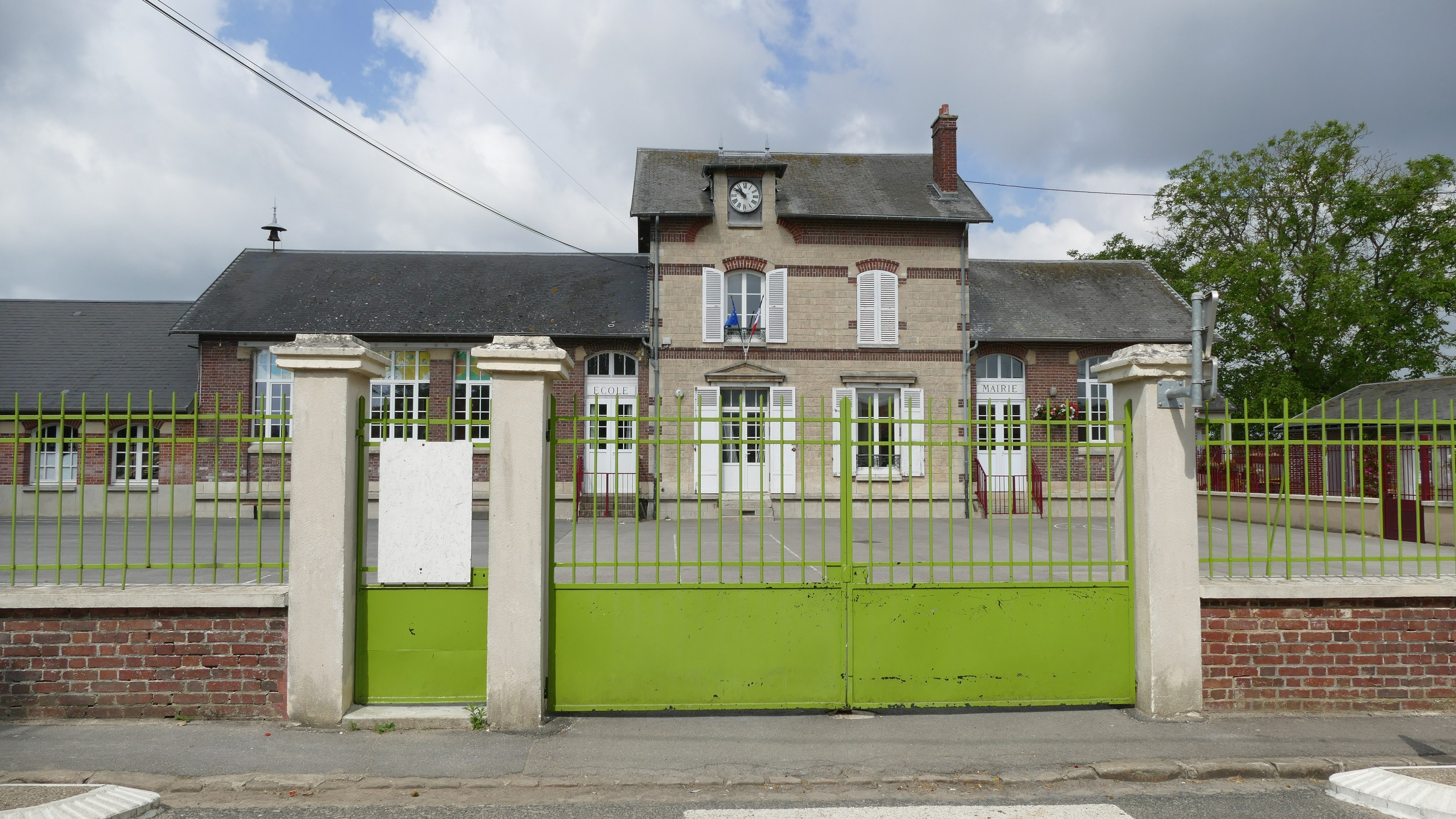
- The town hall and school in Boissy-Fresnoy
- Location of Boissy-Fresnoy
- Location within France Location within Hauts-de-France
- Coordinates: 49°09′52″N 2°52′17″E
- Country: France
- Region: Hauts-de-France
- Department: Oise
- Arrondissement: Senlis
- Canton: Nanteuil-le-Haudouin
- Intercommunality: Pays de Valois

Government
  - Mayor (2021–2026): Martine Bahu
- Area^{1}: 15.87 km^{2} (6.13 sq mi)
- Elevation: 111 m (364 ft)
- Highest elevation: 137 m (449 ft)
- Lowest elevation: 103 m (338 ft)
- Population (2023): 942
  - Density: 59.4/km^{2} (154/sq mi)
- Time zone: UTC+01:00 (CET)
  - Summer (DST): UTC+02:00 (CEST)
- INSEE/Postal code: 60079 /60440
- ^{1} French Land Register data, which excludes lakes, ponds, glaciers > 1 km^{2} (0.386 sq mi or 247 acres) and river estuaries.

Boissy-Fresnoy (French pronunciation: [bwasi fʁɛnwa]) is a commune in the Oise department in northern France.

== Population ==
Historical population
Year	Pop.	±% p.a.
1968	460	—
1975	433	−0.86%
1982	494	+1.90%
1990	634	+3.17%
1999	799	+2.60%
2007	899	+1.48%
2012	1,015	+2.46%
2017	999	−0.32%
2023	942	−0.97%
Source: INSEE

== See also ==
- Communes of the Oise department
