= Rosoy-en-Multien =

- Commune
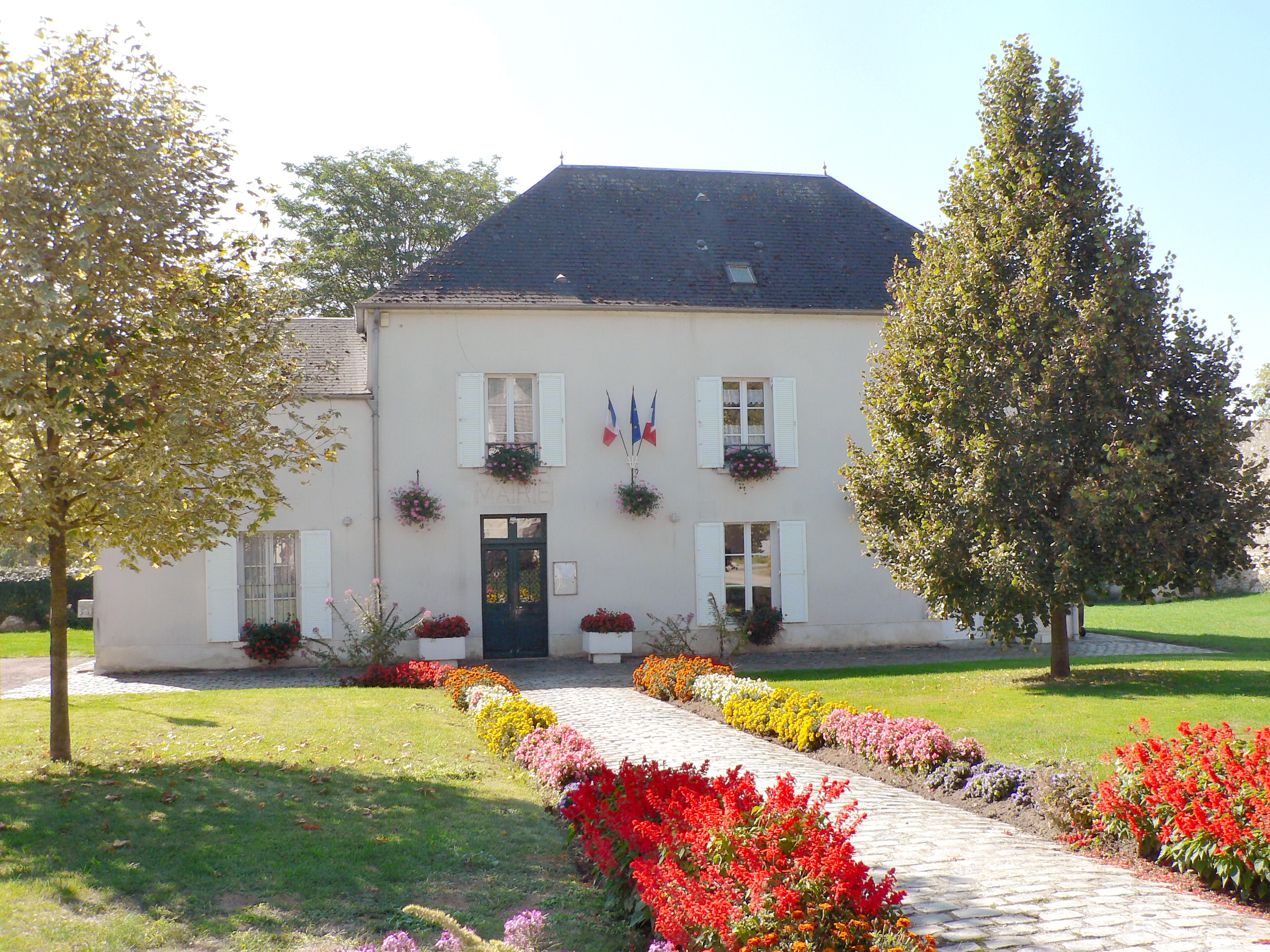
- The town hall in Rosoy-en-Multien
- Location of Rosoy-en-Multien
- Location within France Location within Hauts-de-France
- Coordinates: 49°05′51″N 2°59′41″E
- Country: France
- Region: Hauts-de-France
- Department: Oise
- Arrondissement: Senlis
- Canton: Nanteuil-le-Haudouin
- Intercommunality: Pays de Valois

Government
  - Mayor (2020–2026): Emmanuel Thienpont
- Area^{1}: 8.49 km^{2} (3.28 sq mi)
- Highest elevation: 151 m (495 ft)
- Lowest elevation: 69 m (226 ft)
- Population (2023): 604
  - Density: 71.1/km^{2} (184/sq mi)
- Time zone: UTC+01:00 (CET)
  - Summer (DST): UTC+02:00 (CEST)
- INSEE/Postal code: 60548 /60620
- ^{1} French Land Register data, which excludes lakes, ponds, glaciers > 1 km^{2} (0.386 sq mi or 247 acres) and river estuaries.

Rosoy-en-Multien (French pronunciation: [ʁozwa ɑ̃ myltjɛ̃], lit. 'Rosoy in Multien') is a commune in the Oise department in northern France.

== See also ==
- Communes of the Oise department
