= Ognes, Oise =

Ognes
- Commune
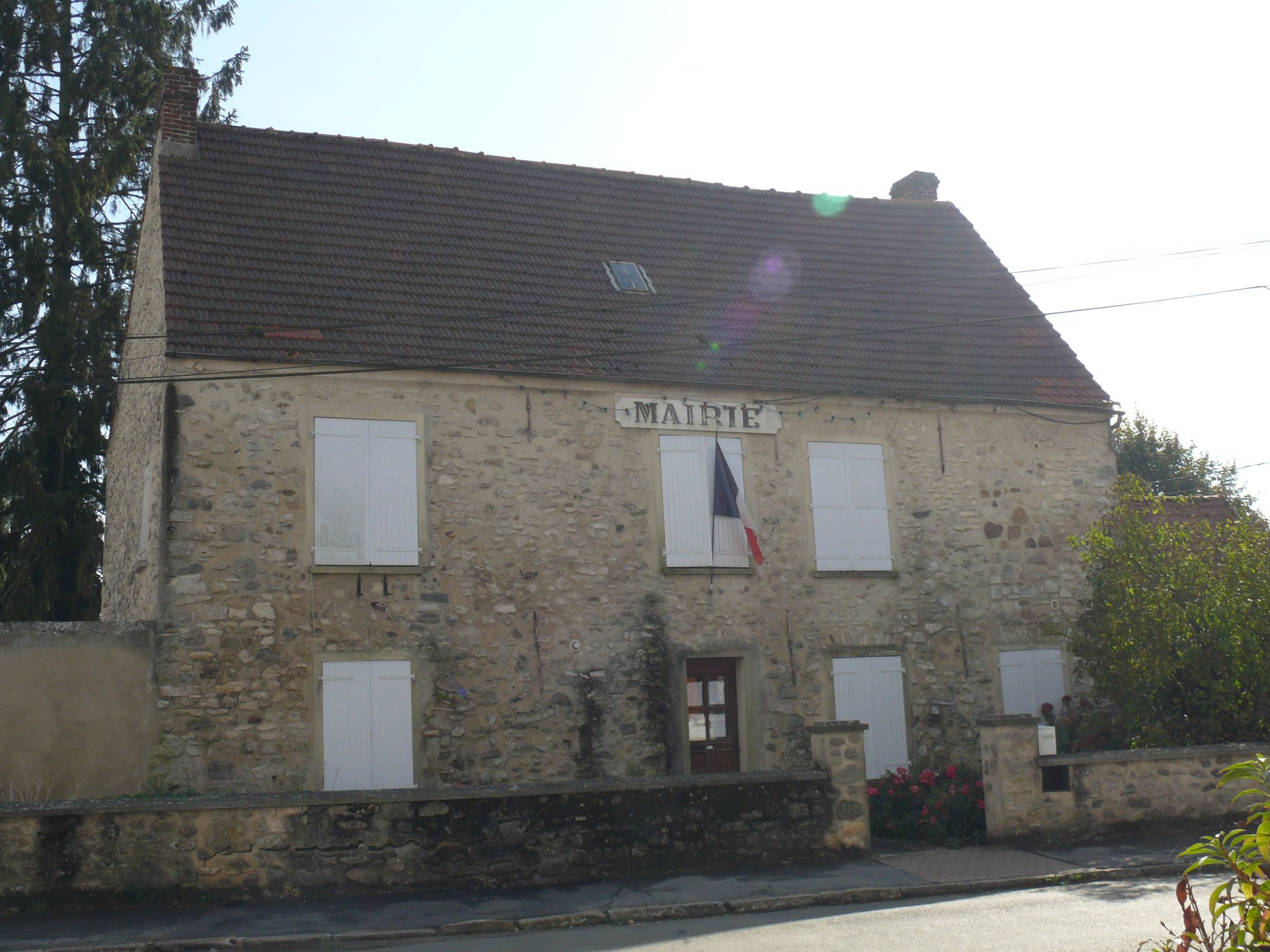
- The town hall in Ognes
- Location of Ognes
- Location within France Location within Hauts-de-France
- Coordinates: 49°06′01″N 2°49′41″E
- Country: France
- Region: Hauts-de-France
- Department: Oise
- Arrondissement: Senlis
- Canton: Nanteuil-le-Haudouin
- Intercommunality: Pays de Valois

Government
  - Mayor (2020–2026): Karine Legrand
- Area^{1}: 6.76 km^{2} (2.61 sq mi)
- Elevation: 129 m (423 ft)
- Highest elevation: 131 m (430 ft)
- Lowest elevation: 97 m (318 ft)
- Population (2023): 346
  - Density: 51.2/km^{2} (133/sq mi)
- Time zone: UTC+01:00 (CET)
  - Summer (DST): UTC+02:00 (CEST)
- INSEE/Postal code: 60473 /60440
- ^{1} French Land Register data, which excludes lakes, ponds, glaciers > 1 km^{2} (0.386 sq mi or 247 acres) and river estuaries.

Ognes (French pronunciation: [ɔɲ]) is a commune in the Oise department in northern France.

== See also ==
- Communes of the Oise department
