= Rouville, Oise =

Rouville
- Commune
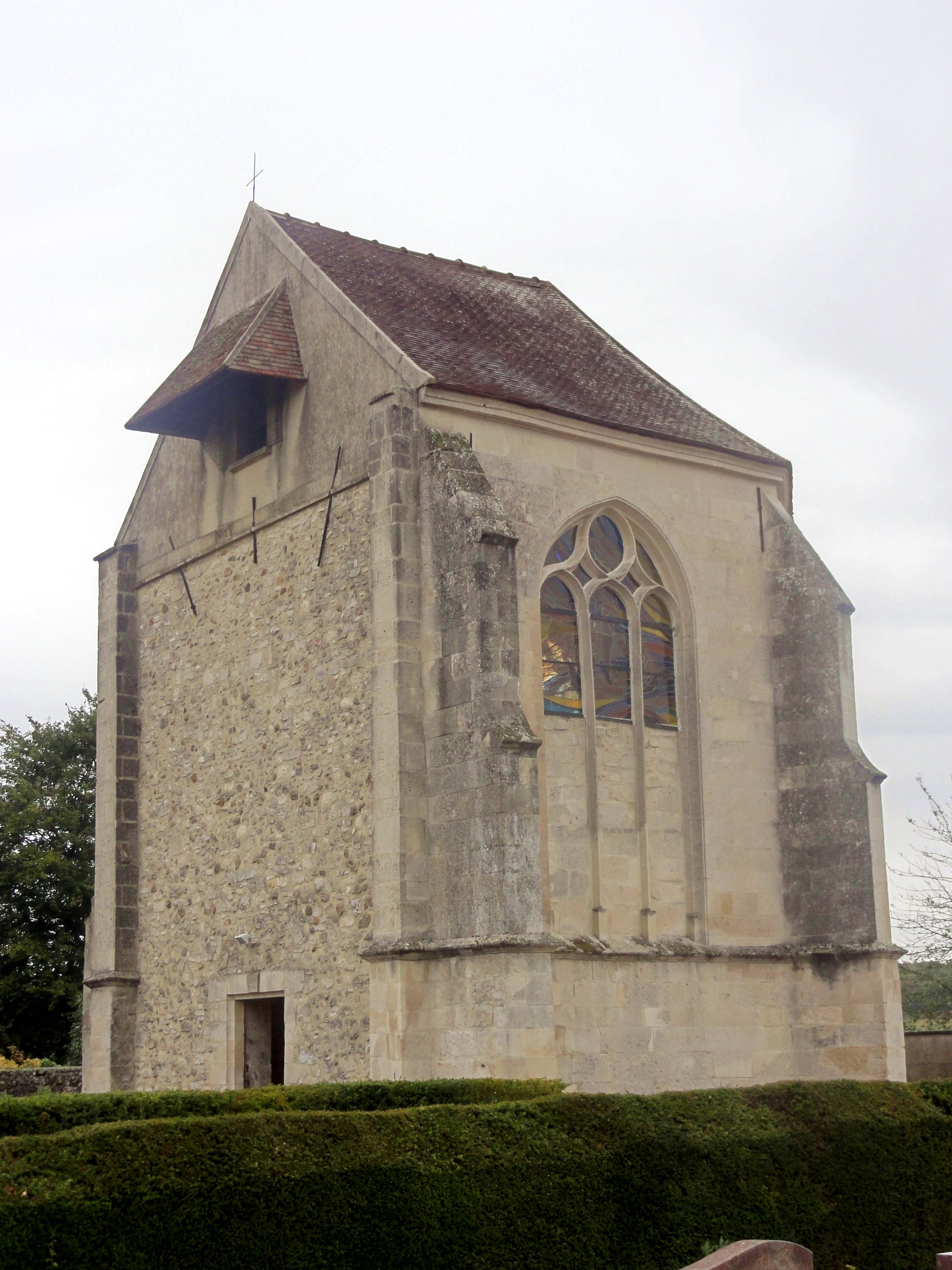
- The church in Rouville
- Location of Rouville
- Location within France Location within Hauts-de-France
- Coordinates: 49°12′30″N 2°52′24″E
- Country: France
- Region: Hauts-de-France
- Department: Oise
- Arrondissement: Senlis
- Canton: Nanteuil-le-Haudouin
- Intercommunality: Pays de Valois

Government
  - Mayor (2020–2026): Jean-Pierre Haudréchy
- Area^{1}: 7 km^{2} (2.7 sq mi)
- Elevation: 100 m (330 ft)
- Highest elevation: 150 m (490 ft)
- Lowest elevation: 90 m (300 ft)
- Population (2023): 254
  - Density: 36/km^{2} (94/sq mi)
- Time zone: UTC+01:00 (CET)
  - Summer (DST): UTC+02:00 (CEST)
- INSEE/Postal code: 60552 /60800
- ^{1} French Land Register data, which excludes lakes, ponds, glaciers > 1 km^{2} (0.386 sq mi or 247 acres) and river estuaries.

Rouville (French pronunciation: [ʁuvil]) is a commune in the Oise department in northern France.

== See also ==
- Communes of the Oise department
