= Versigny, Oise =

Versigny
- Commune
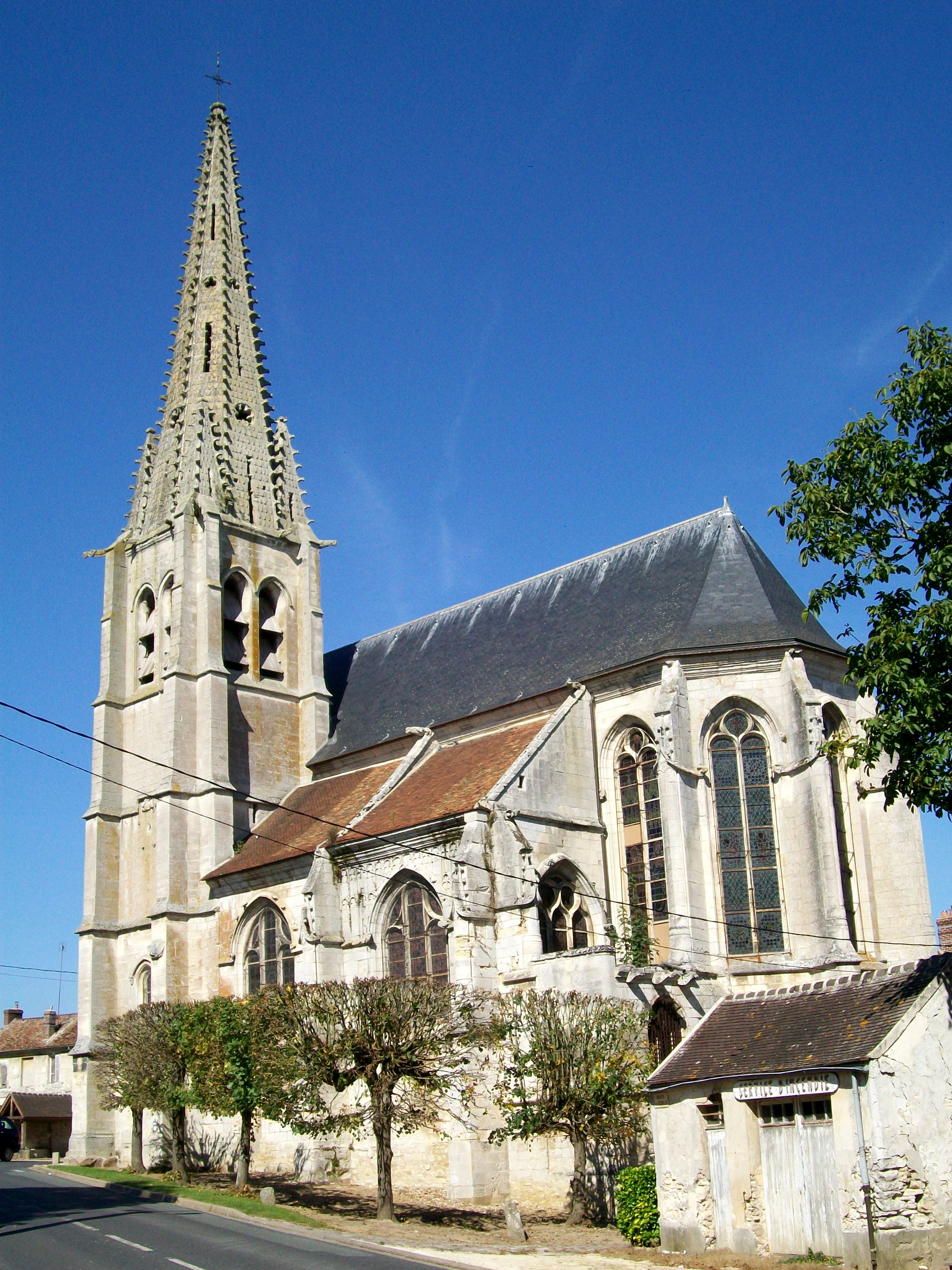
- Church of St. Martin
- Location of Versigny
- Location within France Location within Hauts-de-France
- Coordinates: 49°09′41″N 2°45′51″E
- Country: France
- Region: Hauts-de-France
- Department: Oise
- Arrondissement: Senlis
- Canton: Nanteuil-le-Haudouin
- Intercommunality: Pays de Valois

Government
  - Mayor (2020–2026): Guy-Pierre De Kersaint
- Area^{1}: 14.5 km^{2} (5.6 sq mi)
- Elevation: 70 m (230 ft)
- Highest elevation: 134 m (440 ft)
- Lowest elevation: 72 m (236 ft)
- Population (2023): 349
  - Density: 24.1/km^{2} (62.3/sq mi)
- Time zone: UTC+01:00 (CET)
  - Summer (DST): UTC+02:00 (CEST)
- INSEE/Postal code: 60671 /60440
- ^{1} French Land Register data, which excludes lakes, ponds, glaciers > 1 km^{2} (0.386 sq mi or 247 acres) and river estuaries.

Versigny (French pronunciation: [vɛʁsiɲi]) is a commune in the Oise department in northern France.

== See also ==
- Communes of the Oise department
