= La Villeneuve-sous-Thury =

- Commune
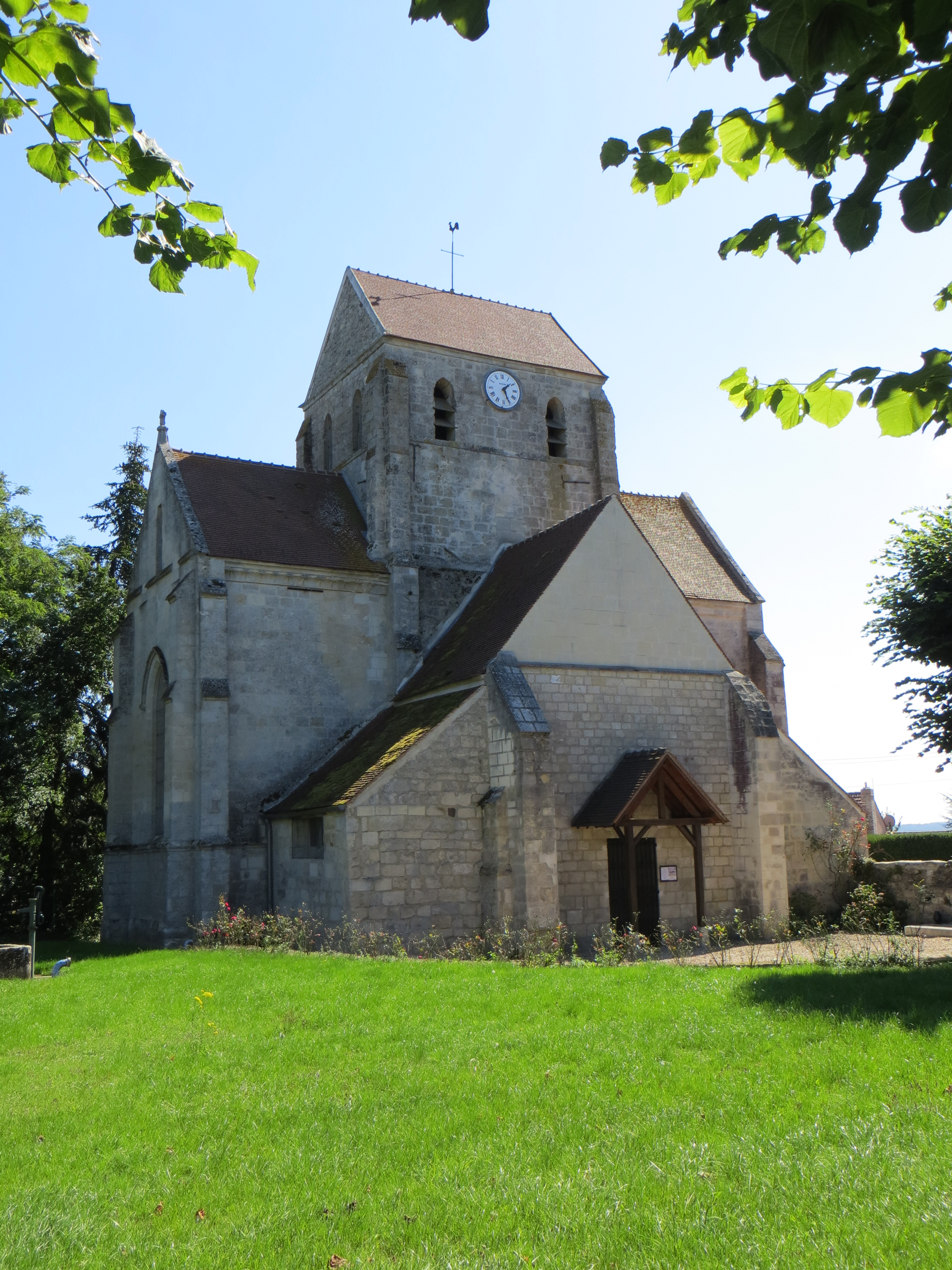
- The church in La Villeneuve-sous-Thury
- Location of La Villeneuve-sous-Thury
- Location within France Location within Hauts-de-France
- Coordinates: 49°09′24″N 3°03′46″E
- Country: France
- Region: Hauts-de-France
- Department: Oise
- Arrondissement: Senlis
- Canton: Nanteuil-le-Haudouin
- Intercommunality: Pays de Valois

Government
  - Mayor (2020–2026): Adeline Clergot
- Area^{1}: 4.32 km^{2} (1.67 sq mi)
- Elevation: 134 m (440 ft)
- Highest elevation: 136 m (446 ft)
- Lowest elevation: 62 m (203 ft)
- Population (2023): 140
  - Density: 32/km^{2} (84/sq mi)
- Time zone: UTC+01:00 (CET)
  - Summer (DST): UTC+02:00 (CEST)
- INSEE/Postal code: 60679 /60890
- ^{1} French Land Register data, which excludes lakes, ponds, glaciers > 1 km^{2} (0.386 sq mi or 247 acres) and river estuaries.

La Villeneuve-sous-Thury (French pronunciation: [la vilnœv su tyʁi], literally La Villeneuve under Thury) is a commune in the Oise department in northern France.

== See also ==
- Communes of the Oise department
