= Bargny, Oise =

Bargny
- Commune
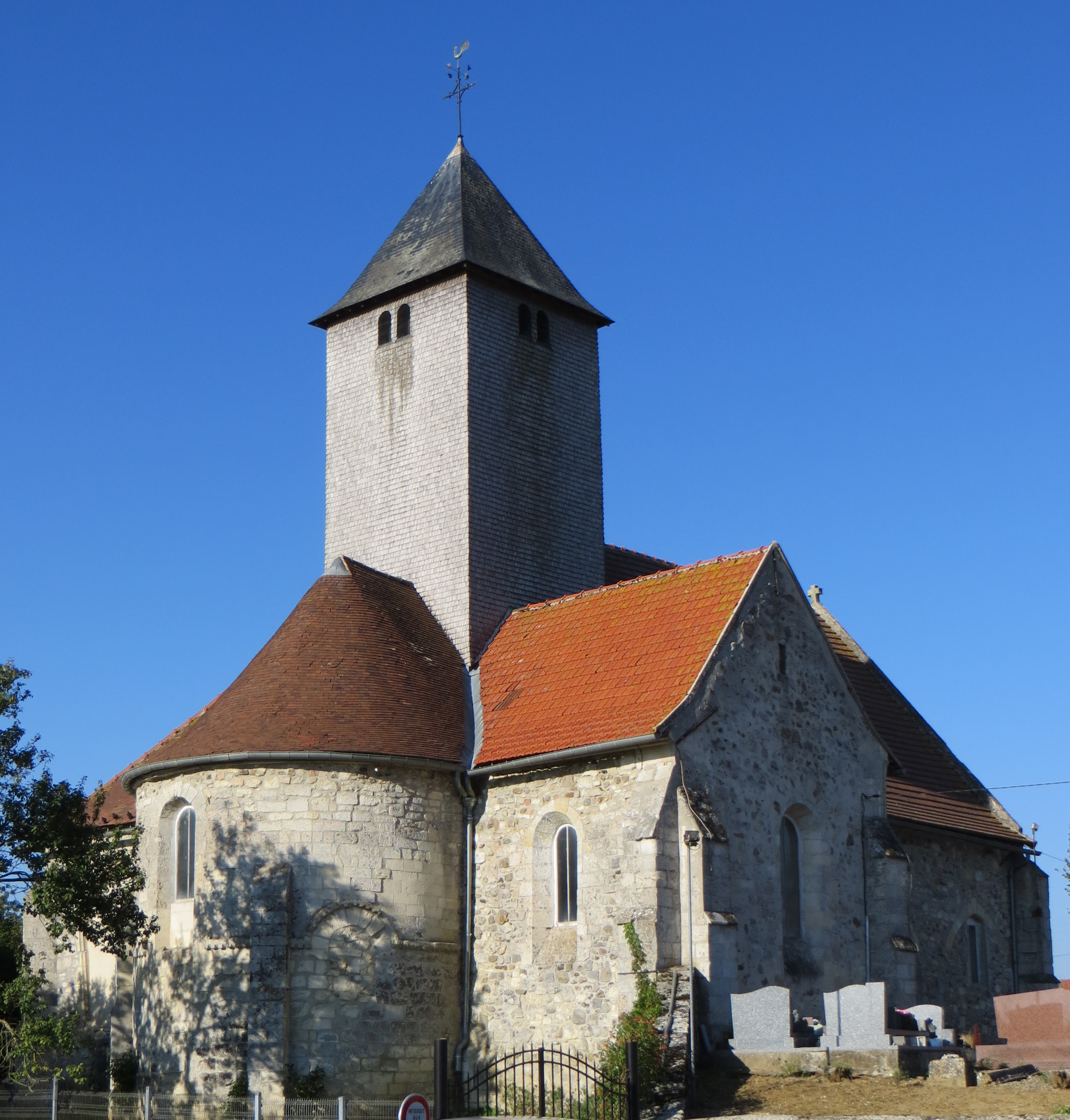
- The church in Bargny
- Location of Bargny
- Location within France Location within Hauts-de-France
- Coordinates: 49°10′45″N 2°57′24″E
- Country: France
- Region: Hauts-de-France
- Department: Oise
- Arrondissement: Senlis
- Canton: Nanteuil-le-Haudouin
- Intercommunality: Pays de Valois

Government
  - Mayor (2020–2026): Martine Vanier
- Area^{1}: 7.54 km^{2} (2.91 sq mi)
- Elevation: 136 m (446 ft)
- Highest elevation: 139 m (456 ft)
- Lowest elevation: 105 m (344 ft)
- Population (2023): 324
  - Density: 43.0/km^{2} (111/sq mi)
- Time zone: UTC+01:00 (CET)
  - Summer (DST): UTC+02:00 (CEST)
- INSEE/Postal code: 60046 /60620
- ^{1} French Land Register data, which excludes lakes, ponds, glaciers > 1 km^{2} (0.386 sq mi or 247 acres) and river estuaries.

Bargny (French pronunciation: [baʁɲi]) is a commune in the Oise department in northern France.

== Population ==
Historical population
Year	Pop.	±% p.a.
1968	160	—
1975	158	−0.18%
1982	177	+1.64%
1990	207	+1.98%
1999	215	+0.42%
2007	258	+2.31%
2012	308	+3.61%
2017	332	+1.51%
2023	324	−0.41%
Source: INSEE

== See also ==
- Communes of the Oise department
