= Antilly, Oise =

Antilly
- Commune
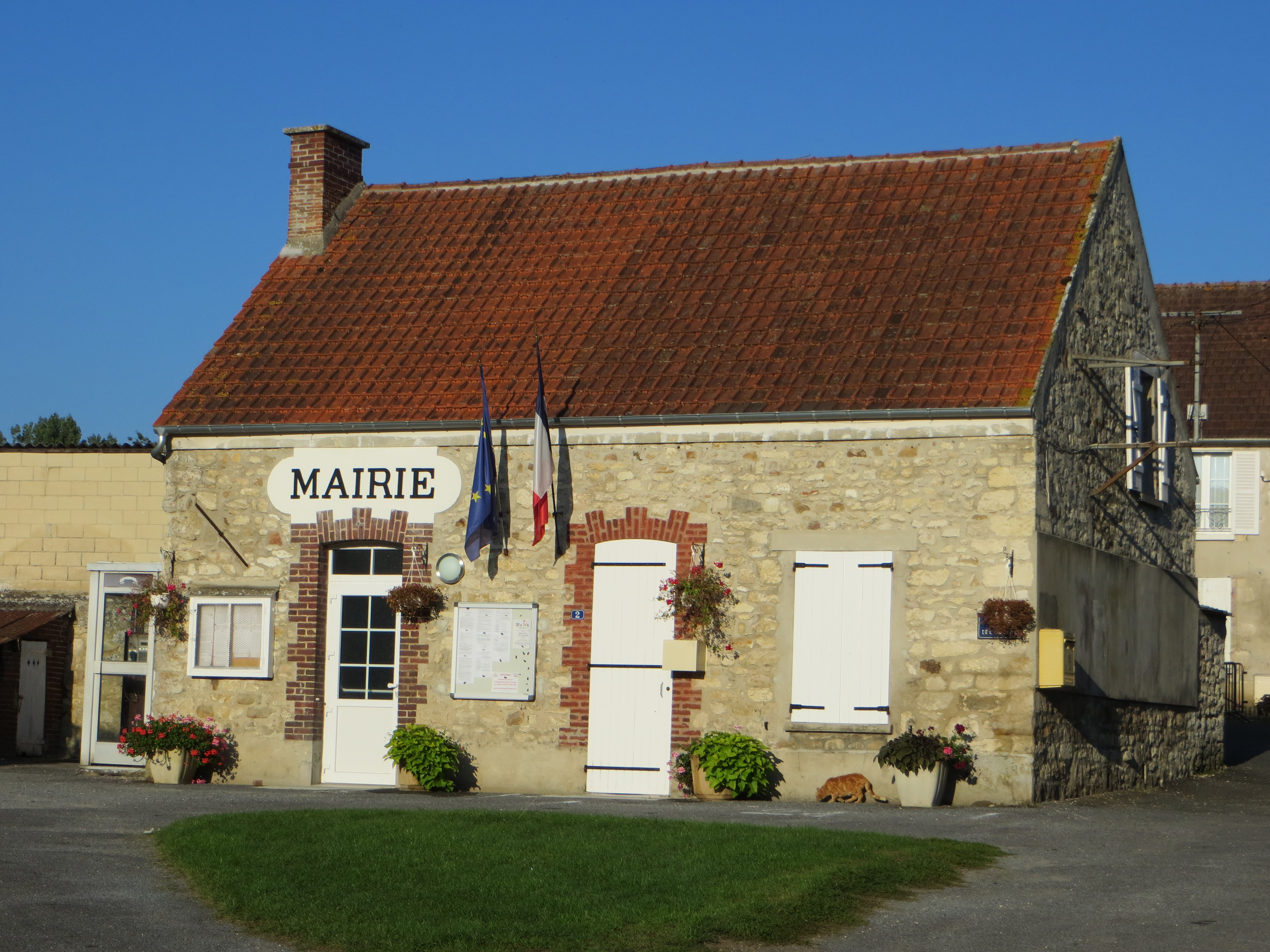
- The town hall in Antilly
- Location of Antilly
- Location within France Location within Hauts-de-France
- Coordinates: 49°09′11″N 2°59′03″E
- Country: France
- Region: Hauts-de-France
- Department: Oise
- Arrondissement: Senlis
- Canton: Nanteuil-le-Haudouin
- Intercommunality: Pays de Valois

Government
  - Mayor (2020–2026): Pierre Napora
- Area^{1}: 3.64 km^{2} (1.41 sq mi)
- Elevation: 96 m (315 ft)
- Highest elevation: 142 m (466 ft)
- Lowest elevation: 77 m (253 ft)
- Population (2023): 273
  - Density: 75.0/km^{2} (194/sq mi)
- Time zone: UTC+01:00 (CET)
  - Summer (DST): UTC+02:00 (CEST)
- INSEE/Postal code: 60020 /60620
- ^{1} French Land Register data, which excludes lakes, ponds, glaciers > 1 km^{2} (0.386 sq mi or 247 acres) and river estuaries.

Antilly is a commune in the Oise department in northern France.

== Population ==
Historical population
Year	Pop.	±% p.a.
1968	190	—
1975	233	+2.96%
1982	241	+0.48%
1990	271	+1.48%
1999	313	+1.61%
2007	333	+0.78%
2012	303	−1.87%
2017	264	−2.72%
2023	273	+0.56%
Source: INSEE

== See also ==
- Communes of the Oise department
