= Gondreville, Oise =

Gondreville
- Commune
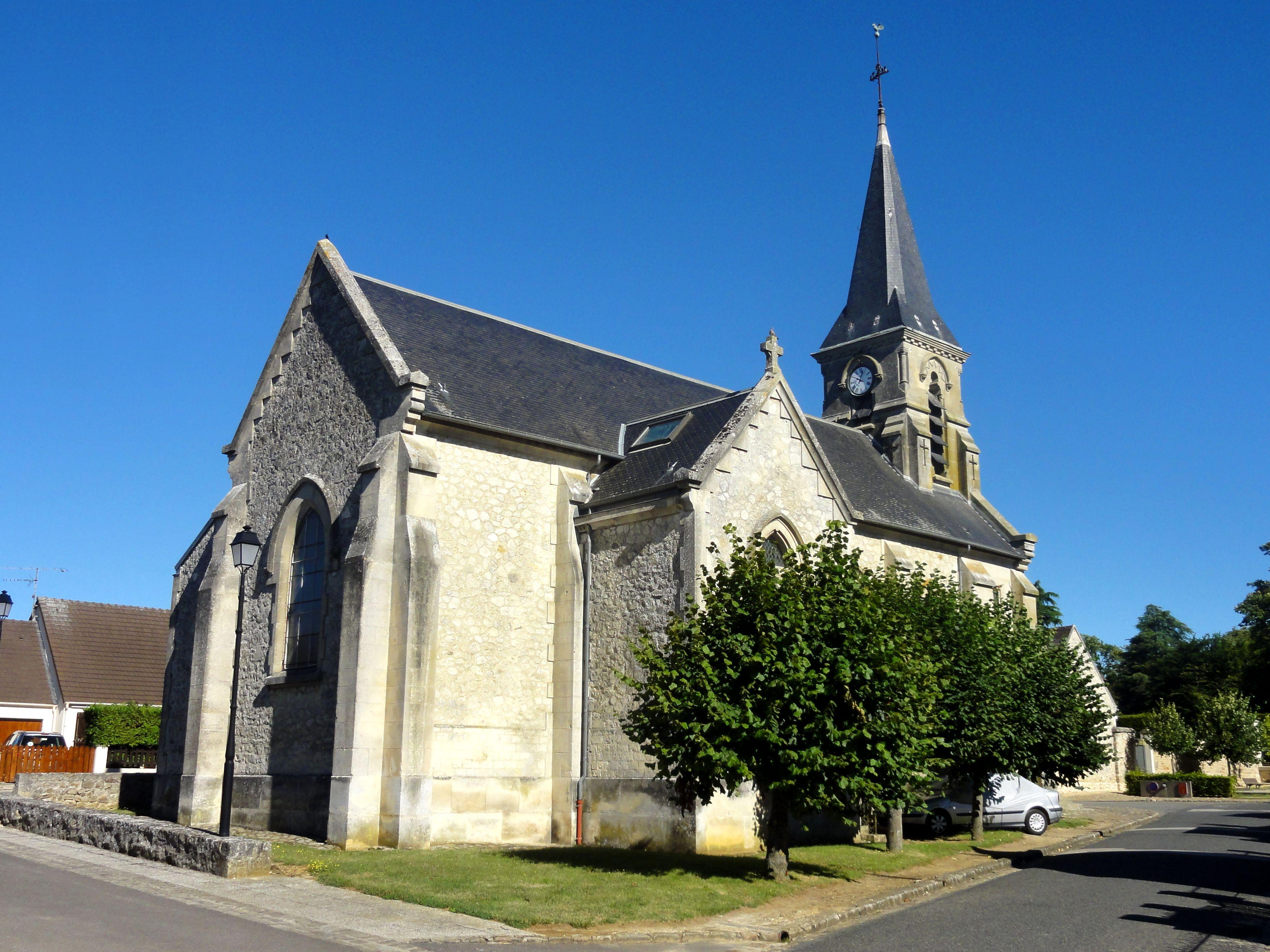
- The church in Gondreville
- Location of Gondreville
- Location within France Location within Hauts-de-France
- Coordinates: 49°13′01″N 2°57′20″E
- Country: France
- Region: Hauts-de-France
- Department: Oise
- Arrondissement: Senlis
- Canton: Nanteuil-le-Haudouin
- Intercommunality: Pays de Valois

Government
  - Mayor (2020–2026): Alain Bizouard
- Area^{1}: 7.09 km^{2} (2.74 sq mi)
- Elevation: 148 m (486 ft)
- Highest elevation: 158 m (518 ft)
- Lowest elevation: 104 m (341 ft)
- Population (2023): 233
  - Density: 32.9/km^{2} (85.1/sq mi)
- Time zone: UTC+01:00 (CET)
  - Summer (DST): UTC+02:00 (CEST)
- INSEE/Postal code: 60279 /60117
- ^{1} French Land Register data, which excludes lakes, ponds, glaciers > 1 km^{2} (0.386 sq mi or 247 acres) and river estuaries.

Gondreville (French pronunciation: [ɡɔ̃dʁəvil]) is a commune in the Oise department in northern France.

== See also ==
- Communes of the Oise department
