= List of twin towns and sister cities in the Republic of Ireland =

Map of Ireland

This is a list of places in Republic of Ireland which have standing links to local communities in other countries known as "town twinning" (usually in Europe) or "sister cities" (usually in the rest of the world). In the Republic of Ireland, this association is formalised by local government.

== A ==
Adare

- Buckow, Germany
- Villecresnes, France

Ardee

- Nettuno, Italy

Arklow

- Aberystwyth, Wales, United Kingdom
- Châteaudun, France

Askeaton

- Montbron, France

Athboy

- Béthancourt-en-Valois, France
- Feigneux, France
- Fresnoy-la-Rivière, France
- Gilocourt, France
- Glaignes, France
- Morienval, France
- Orrouy, France
- Russy-Bémont, France
- Séry-Magneval, France

Athenry

- Quimperlé, France
- Renews-Cappahayden, Canada

Athlone

- Châteaubriant, France
- Providence, United States

Athy

- Grandvilliers, France

Avoca

- Bromham, England, United Kingdom

== B ==
Bagenalstown

- Pont-Péan, France

Balbriggan

- Belmar, United States
- Sankt Wendel, Germany

Ballina

- Athis-Mons, France
- Pittsfield, United States
- Scranton, United States

Ballinasloe

- Chalonnes-sur-Loire, France

Ballincollig

- Mechterstädt (Hörsel), Germany
- Saclay, France

Ballybay

- Osterhofen, Germany

Ballydehob

- Cléden-Cap-Sizun, France

Ballylanders

- Wyandotte County, United States

Ballymahon

- Landaul, France
- Landévant, France

Ballymakeera

- Lanrivain, France

Ballymoe

- Boys Town, United States

Ballyshannon

- Grenay, France
- Séné, France

Ballyvourney

- Trémargat, France

Balrothery

- Landéan, France

Bandon

- Bandon, United States

Bantry

- La Crosse, United States
- Pont-l'Abbé, France

Beaufort

- Beaufort, United States

Blackrock

- Vincennes, France

Blessington

- O'Neill, United States

Bray

- Bègles, France
- Dublin, United States
- Würzburg, Germany

Buncrana

- Campbellsville, United States
- Fréhel, France
- Plévenon, France

Bundoran is a member of the Douzelage, a town twinning association of towns across the European Union, along with:

- Agros, Cyprus
- Altea, Spain
- Asikkala, Finland
- Bad Kötzting, Germany
- Bellagio, Italy
- Chojna, Poland
- Granville, France
- Holstebro, Denmark
- Houffalize, Belgium
- Judenburg, Austria
- Kőszeg, Hungary
- Marsaskala, Malta
- Meerssen, Netherlands
- Niederanven, Luxembourg
- Oxelösund, Sweden
- Preveza, Greece
- Rokiškis, Lithuania
- Rovinj, Croatia
- Sesimbra, Portugal
- Sherborne, England, United Kingdom
- Sigulda, Latvia
- Siret, Romania
- Škofja Loka, Slovenia
- Sušice, Czech Republic
- Tryavna, Bulgaria
- Türi, Estonia
- Zvolen, Slovakia

== C ==
Cahir

- Scarborough, England, United Kingdom

Cappamore

- Langonnet, France

Cappoquin

- Chanat-la-Mouteyre, France

County Carlow

- Davenport, United States

Carlow

- Dole, France
- Northwich, England, United Kingdom
- Tempe, United States

Carndonagh

- St. Charles, United States

Carrickmacross

- Carhaix-Plouguer, France

Carrigaline

- Guidel, France
- Kirchseeon, Germany

Cashel is a member of the Charter of European Rural Communities, a town twinning association across the European Union, alongside with:

- Bienvenida, Spain
- Bièvre, Belgium
- Bucine, Italy
- Cissé, France
- Desborough, England, United Kingdom
- Esch (Haaren), Netherlands
- Hepstedt, Germany
- Ibănești, Romania
- Kandava (Tukums), Latvia
- Kannus, Finland
- Kolindros, Greece
- Lassee, Austria
- Medzev, Slovakia
- Næstved, Denmark
- Nagycenk, Hungary
- Nadur, Malta
- Ockelbo, Sweden
- Pano Lefkara, Cyprus
- Põlva, Estonia
- Samuel (Soure), Portugal
- Starý Poddvorov, Czech Republic
- Strzyżów, Poland
- Svoge, Bulgaria
- Tisno, Croatia
- Troisvierges, Luxembourg
- Žagarė (Joniškis), Lithuania

Castlebar

- Dixon, United States
- Höchstadt an der Aisch, Germany
- Peekskill, United States

Castleblayney

- Marseillan, France

Castlecomer

- Penvénan, France

Castleisland

- Bannalec, France

Cavan

- Jaunay-Marigny, France

Charleville

- Plouaret, France
- Le Vieux-Marché, France

County Clare

- Clare and Gilbert Valleys, Australia
- Newry, Mourne and Down, Northern Ireland, United Kingdom

Clifden

- Coyoacán (Mexico City), Mexico
- Plouarzel, France

Clonakilty

- Waldaschaff, Germany

Clonmel

- Costa Masnaga, Italy
- Eysines, France
- Gangi, Italy
- Peoria, United States
- Reading, England, United Kingdom
- Trofaiach, Austria

Cobh

- Cruzeiro, Brazil
- Kolbuszowa, Poland
- Lake Charles, United States
- Pontarddulais, Wales, United Kingdom
- Ploërmel, France

County Cork

- Cook County, United States
- Miami-Dade County, United States

Cork

- Cologne, Germany
- Coventry, England, United Kingdom
- Manizales, Colombia
- Rennes, France
- San Francisco, United States
- Shanghai, China
- Swansea, Wales, United Kingdom

Corofin

- Tonquédec, France

Cúil Aodha

- Peumerit-Quintin, France

== D ==
Dingle

- Tolfa, Italy
- West Springfield, United States

County Donegal

- St. Louis, United States

Drogheda

- Bronte, Italy
- Saint-Mandé, France
- Salinas, United States

Drumshanbo

- Locquirec, France

Dublin

- Barcelona, Spain
- Beijing, China
- Kyiv, Ukraine
- Liverpool, England, United Kingdom
- San Jose, United States

Dún Laoghaire

- Brest, France
- Isle of Anglesey, Wales, United Kingdom

Dundalk

- Pikeville, United States
- Rezé, France

Dungarvan

- Erie, United States

Dunmanway

- Quéven, France

Dunmore

- Querrien, France

== E ==
Ennis

- Langenfeld, Germany
- Phoenix, United States
- Saint-Paul-de-Fenouillet, France

Enniscorthy

- Gimont, France

== F ==
Fermoy

- Ploemeur, France

Ferns

- Yelm, United States

County Fingal

- Chengdu, China

== G ==
Galway

- Aalborg, Denmark
- Bradford, England, United Kingdom
- Cambridge, United States
- Chicago, United States
- Lorient, France
- Menlo Park, United States
- Milwaukee, United States
- Seattle, United States
- St. Louis, United States

Gorey

- Oban, Scotland, United Kingdom

Greystones

- Holyhead, Wales, United Kingdom

== H ==
Hacketstown

- Hackettstown, United States

Headford

- Le Faouët, France
- Morgan Hill, United States

== I ==
Inniscarra

- Plougonven, France

== K ==
Kanturk

- Rostrenen, France

Kilcullen

- Saint-Contest, France

County Kildare

- Deauville, France
- Lexington, United States

Kildare

- Corps-Nuds, France

Kilkee

- Plouhinec, France

County Kilkenny

- Kilkenny, United States

Kilkenny

- Formigine, Italy
- Malbork, Poland

Killaloe

- New London, United States

Killarney

- Casperia, Italy
- Castiglione di Sicilia, Italy
- Concord, United States
- Cooper City, United States
- Kendal, England, United Kingdom
- Myrtle Beach, United States
- Pleinfeld, Germany
- Scottsdale, United States
- Springfield, United States
- Staffanstorp, Sweden

Killorglin

- Plouha, France

Kilnamartyra

- Kergrist-Moëlou, France

Kilrush

- Plouzané, France

Kinsale

- Antibes, France
- Newport, United States

== L ==
Lahinch

- Arzon, France

County Laois

- Franklin, United States

Laragh

- Otročiněves, Czech Republic

Leixlip

- Bressuire, France
- Niles, United States

Letterkenny

- Elizabethtown, United States
- Rudolstadt, Germany

County Limerick

- Debrecen, Hungary
- Hohenlohe (district), Germany
- New Brunswick, United States

Limerick

- A Coruña, Spain
- Austin, United States
- Kansas City, United States
- Limerick Township, United States
- Lowell, United States
- Quimper, France
- Santa Clara, United States
- Spokane, United States

Lismore

- Lismore, Australia

Listowel

- Downpatrick, Northern Ireland, United Kingdom
- Listowel (North Perth), Canada
- Los Gatos, United States
- Panissières, France
- Shawnee, United States

Longford

- Huixquilucan, Mexico
- Noyal-Châtillon-sur-Seiche, France
- Sparks, United States

Loughshinny

- Quistinic, France

Louisburgh

- Louisbourg (Cape Breton), Canada
- Moëlan-sur-Mer, France

Lusk

- Thorigné-Fouillard, France

== M ==
Macroom

- Bubry, France
- Marcallo con Casone, Italy

Mallow

- Tinley Park, United States
- Tréguier, France

Maynooth

- Canet-en-Roussillon, France

County Mayo

- Calderdale, England, United Kingdom
- Cleveland, United States
- Marijampolė, Lithuania

County Meath

- Cary, United States
- Guiyang, China

Millstreet

- Pommerit-le-Vicomte, France

County Monaghan

- Cavan Monaghan, Canada
- Geel, Belgium
- Miramichi, Canada
- Peterborough, Canada
- Prince Edward Island, Canada

Monasterboice

- Letham, Scotland, United Kingdom

Murroe

- Évry-Grégy-sur-Yerre, France

== N ==
Naas

- Allaire, France
- Casalattico, Italy
- Dillingen an der Donau, Germany
- Omaha, United States
- St Davids, Wales, United Kingdom

Navan

- Bobbio, Italy
- Broccostella, Italy

Nenagh

- Tonnerre, France

New Ross

- Hartford, United States
- Moncoutant, France
- Newcastle, Northern Ireland, United Kingdom

Newbridge

- Argentré-du-Plessis, France
- Bad Lippspringe, Germany
- Ocala, United States

== O ==
Oldcastle

- Tecumseh, Canada

Oranmore

- Clohars-Fouesnant, France

== P ==
Passage West

- Chasseneuil-du-Poitou, France

Portarlington

- Arlington, United States
- Redessan, France

Portlaoise

- Coulounieix-Chamiers, France

== R ==
Rathcoole

- École-Valentin, France

Roscommon

- Chartrettes, France

Roundwood

- Spézet, France

Rush

- Gourin, France
- San Mauro Castelverde, Italy

== S ==
Schull

- Guilvinec, France

Shannon

- Guingamp, France

Sixmilebridge

- Nort-sur-Erdre, France

Skerries

- Guichen, France

Sligo

- Crozon, France
- Everett, United States
- Kempten, Germany
- Tallahassee, United States

County South Dublin

- Brent, England, United Kingdom
- Tampa, United States

Swords

- Ozoir-la-Ferrière, France

== T ==
Taghmaconnell

- Downey, United States

Templemore

- Potenza Picena, Italy
- Prémilhat, France

Thurles

- Bollington, England, United Kingdom

Tipperary

- Mautern in Steiermark, Austria
- Parthenay, France

Tralee

- Beit Sahour, Palestine
- Holyoke, United States
- Springfield, United States
- Westlake, United States

Trim

- Étrépagny, France

Tuam

- Straubing, Germany

Tullamore

- Chandler, United States

Tydavnet

- Geel, Belgium

== W ==
Waterford

- Haikou, China
- Märkischer Kreis, Germany
- Ramallah, Palestine
- Rochester, United States
- Saint-Herblain, France
- St. John's, Canada

West Cork

- Scituate, United States

Westport

- Limavady, Northern Ireland, United Kingdom
- Plougastel-Daoulas, France

County Wexford

- Yanga, Mexico

Wexford

- Annapolis, United States
- Couëron, France
- Fleurus, Belgium
- Lugo, Italy

Whitegate

- Péchabou, France

County Wicklow

- Würzburg, Germany

Wicklow

- Eichenzell, Germany
- Montigny-le-Bretonneux, France
- Porthmadog, Wales, United Kingdom

== Y ==
Youghal

- New Bedford, United States
