= Athboy =

Town in County Meath, Ireland

Athboy Baile Átha Buí
- Town
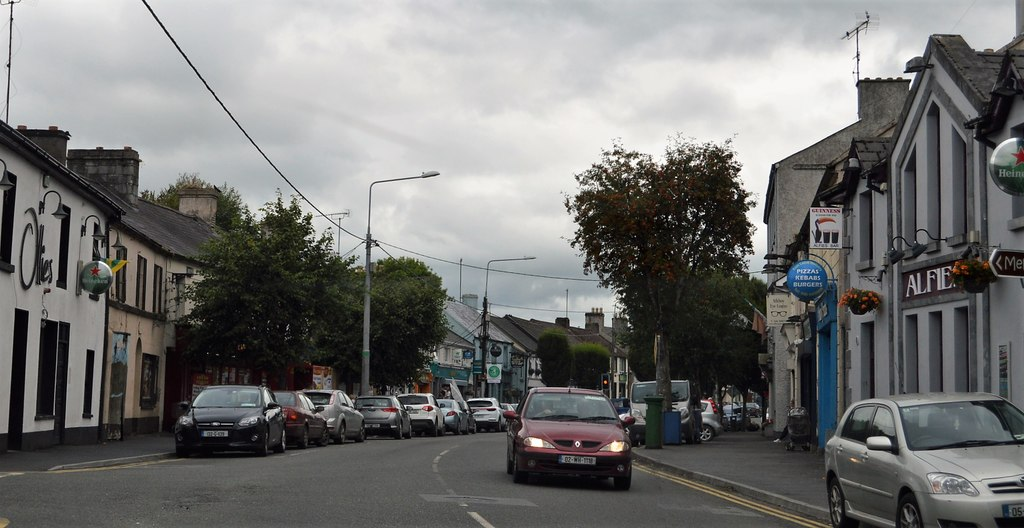
- The N51 passes through Athboy

- Location in Ireland
- Coordinates: 53°37′00″N 6°55′00″W
- Country: Ireland
- Province: Leinster
- County: County Meath
- Elevation: 61 m (200 ft)

Population (2022)
  - Total: 2,596
- Time zone: UTC+0 (WET)
  - Summer (DST): UTC-1 (IST (WEST))
- Irish Grid Reference: N800567

Historical population
Year	Pop.	±%
1821	1,569	—
1831	1,959	+24.9%
1841	1,826	−6.8%
1851	1,204	−34.1%
1861	982	−18.4%
1871	861	−12.3%
1881	748	−13.1%
1891	633	−15.4%
1901	610	−3.6%
1911	575	−5.7%
1926	510	−11.3%
1936	520	+2.0%
1946	402	−22.7%
1951	418	+4.0%
1956	717	+71.5%
1961	680	−5.2%
1966	678	−0.3%
1971	705	+4.0%
1981	909	+28.9%
1986	1,055	+16.1%
1991	1,083	+2.7%
1996	1,172	+8.2%
2002	1,538	+31.2%
2006	2,213	+43.9%
2011	2,397	+8.3%
2016	2,445	+2.0%
2022	2,596	+6.2%

Athboy (Irish: Baile Átha Buí, meaning 'town of the yellow ford') is a small agricultural town located in County Meath. The town is located on the Yellow Ford River, in wooded country near the County Westmeath border. It is around 15 km west of Navan and 50 km north-west of Dublin. The town is in a civil parish of the same name.

== History ==
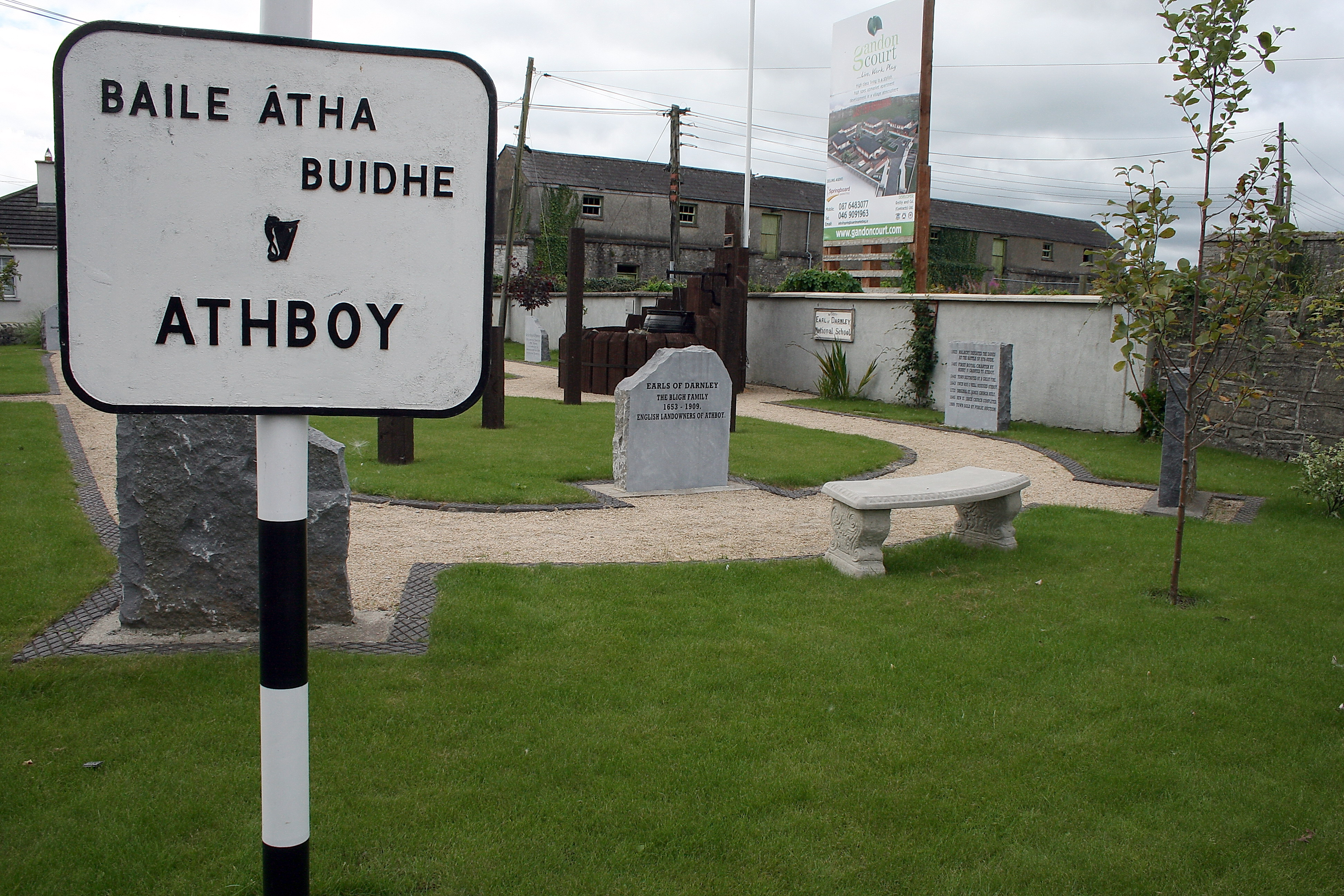
Athboy, history pocket park

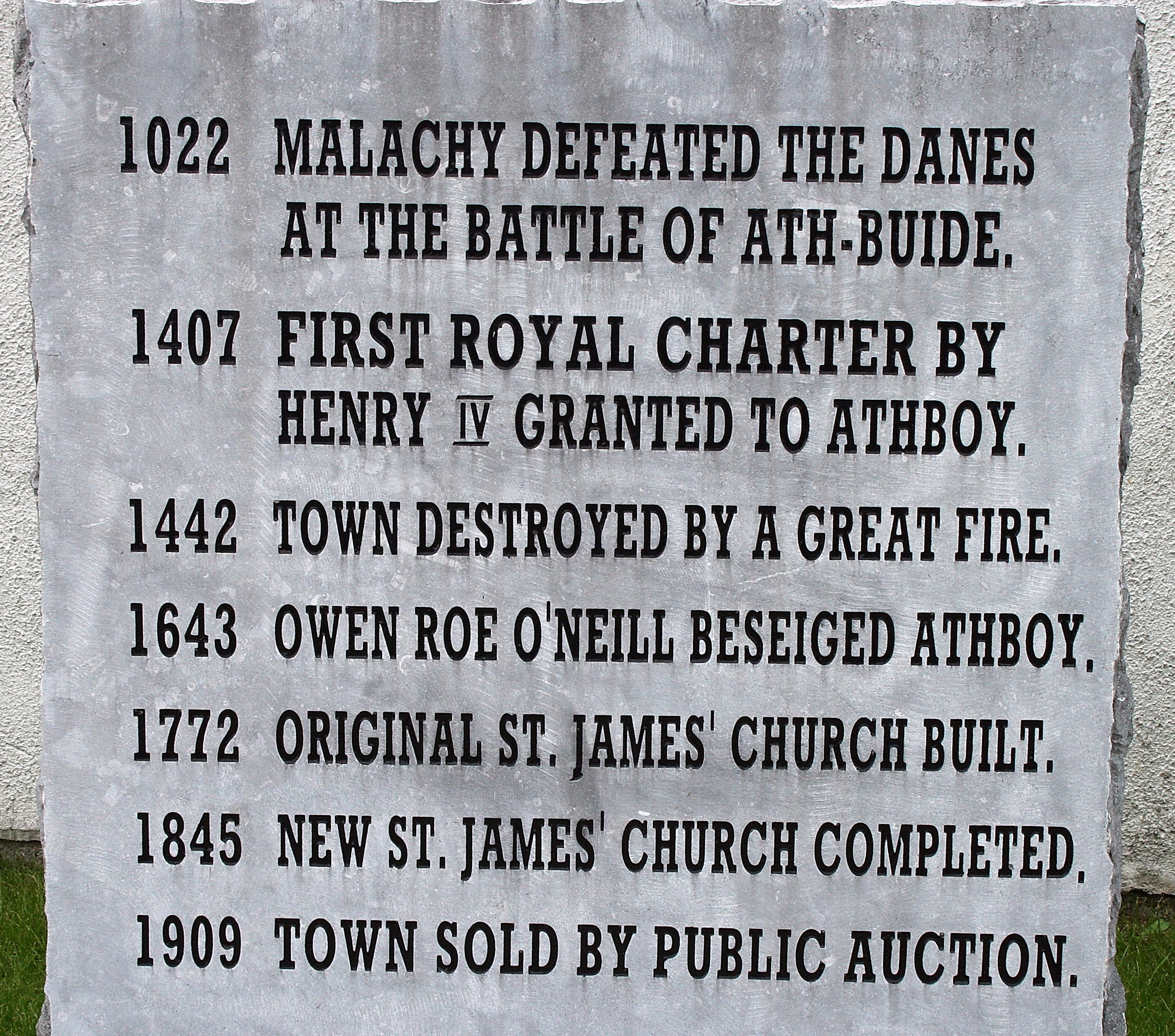
History written in stone

In medieval times it was a walled stronghold of the Pale. Eoin Roe O'Neill took it in 1643, and six years later Oliver Cromwell camped his army on the Hill of Ward nearby. Also known as Tlachtga, the Hill of Ward was the location for the pagan feast of Samhain, the precursor of modern-day Halloween.

The tower of St James, Church of Ireland, is a remnant of a 14th-century Carmelite priory. Behind the church are the remains of the town walls. The church boasts an interesting medieval tabletop.

Athboy was a constituency in the Irish House of Commons from 1613 until the Act of Union in 1800.

In 1694, the town's 'lands and commons' and several other denominations of land were erected into a manor and granted to Thomas Bligh, MP for Athboy, who had earlier purchased almost 12 km^{2} (3000 acres) in the area of Athboy. His son, John, was created Earl of Darnley in 1725 and the Blighs (Earls of Darnley) were landlords of all but six of the 27 townlands in the parish of Athboy throughout the 18th and 19th centuries.

Ivo Bligh, 8th Earl of Darnley placed the fee-simple of the town of Athboy up for public auction in June 1909. The townspeople formed their own branch of The Town Tenants League and with the aid of Joseph Coghlan-Briscoe, national secretary of the league, they were able to purchase their homes and businesses via private treaty. The demesne of the Darnley Estate at Clifton Lodge just outside the town was sold in 1909 to Welsh explorer Mordecai Jones. Not long after Jones' death in 1913 his Japanese manservant Sanotic Koniste was found murdered in a field not far from Clifton Lodge. Both Jones and Koniste are buried in the graveyard of St. James' Church.

== Transport ==
=== Rail ===
Athboy railway station opened on 26 February 1864, at the end of a branch from Kilmessan via Trim. It closed to passengers on 27 January 1947 and to goods traffic on 10 March 1947, but the branch remained open for livestock trains until final closure on 1 September 1954. The station building, and the nearby engine shed, are now private residences.

=== Bus ===
Today the town has regular bus services to Trim, Dublin, Granard and Cavan which are provided as Bus Éireann route 111 though passengers to/from Granard and Cavan must change bus at Athboy. A Bus Éireann route, 190A, was introduced in 2013 to provide direct service to Navan, Slane, Drogheda and Laytown. This service was discontinued in 2016. Although additional 111 services were added to include a non-stop service to Dublin and bus connections for Clonmellon. During college terms there is a Sundays-only route 070 coach to Athlone, Navan and Dundalk.

== Education ==
As well as rural primary schools in Rathmore and Rathcairn, O'Growney National School had provided education for the Athboy population since 1949. A new school building was opened in 2016.

In terms of secondary education, the former St. Joseph's Convent of Mercy amalgamated with Athboy Vocational School in 2004 to form Athboy Community School. In 2011, the school relocated to a site behind the former vocational school.

== Sport ==
Local sports clubs are Clann na nGael GAA (the local Gaelic football and hurling), and Athboy Celtic FC (a soccer club). Athboy RFC (a rugby union club) was formed in the area in 1978.

== Popular culture ==
On 4 May 2011, Athboy featured on RTÉ's Dirty Old Towns programme, in which the local community came together to convert an old piggery into a Farmers' Market.

Athboy has been the home of the Blue Jean Country Queen Festival since 1987. The festival, which takes place over the June Bank Holiday weekend, is run by the Meath County executive of Macra na Feirme and invites contestants from all over Ireland and abroad to compete for the title of Blue Jean Country Queen. In 2014, the festival was almost moved to the nearby town of Navan, however, the intervention of local businesses and, in particular, the local Credit Union branch ensured that the festival remained in Athboy for the foreseeable future.

In 2018, The Flame of Samhain Festival was launched as part of The Spirits of Meath Halloween Festival to celebrate Athboy's links to Halloween. The following year, Fáilte Ireland launched the Púca Festival which incorporated the traditional celebration on the Hill of Ward with a larger festival spread between Athboy, Trim and Drogheda. The festival is expected to bring €12 million for the local economy by 2020.

== Twinning ==
Athboy is twinned with the following places:

- Béthancourt-en-Valois, France
- Feigneux, France
- Fresnoy-la-Rivière, France
- Gilocourt, France
- Glaignes, France
- Morienval, France
- Orrouy, France
- Russy-Bémont, France
- Séry-Magneval, France

== People ==
- Nigel Connell, singer & songwriter, a finalist in The Voice Of Ireland (RTE)
- John Gilroy, author and former Labour politician and member of Seanad Éireann
- Frederick Harvey, recipient of the Victoria Cross
- Jamie McGrath, football player currently playing for Hibernian
- Fr Eugene O'Growney, key figure in the Gaelic Revival

== See also ==
- List of populated places in Ireland

== Sources ==
- Noel E. French, A short history of Rathmore and Athboy (1995)
- Beryl F.E. Moore, "Tombs in Athboy Graveyard", Irish Ancestor, volume 13 (1981), pp. 123–4
