= Béthisy =

Béthisy may refer to:

- Béthisy-Saint-Martin, commune in the Oise department in northern France
- Béthisy-Saint-Pierre, commune in the Oise department in northern France
