= Arrondissement of Senlis =

Coordinates: 49.20°N 2.58°E

Senlis
- Arrondissement
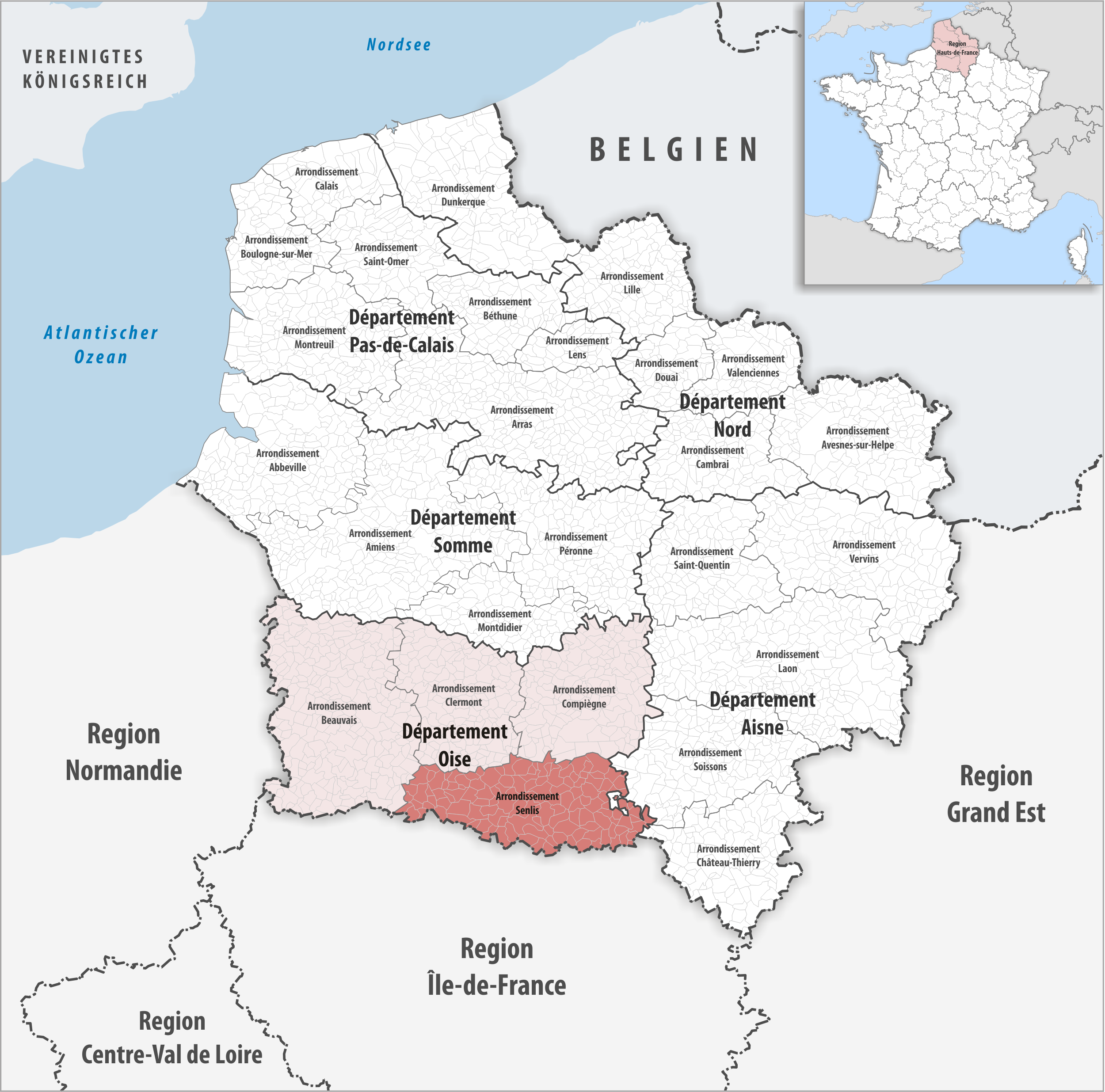
- Location within the region Hauts-de-France
- Country: France
- Region: Hauts-de-France
- Department: Oise
- No. of communes: {{{nbcomm}}}
- Area: 1,344.2 km^{2} (519.0 sq mi)
- Population (2023): 287,531
  - Density: 213.90/km^{2} (554.01/sq mi)
- INSEE code: 604

The arrondissement of Senlis is an arrondissement of France in the Oise department in the Hauts-de-France region. It has 132 communes. Its population is 285,086 (2021), and its area is 1,344.2 km^{2} (519.0 sq mi).

== Composition ==
The communes of the arrondissement of Senlis, and their INSEE codes, are:

1. Acy-en-Multien (60005)
2. Antilly (60020)
3. Apremont (60022)
4. Auger-Saint-Vincent (60027)
5. Aumont-en-Halatte (60028)
6. Autheuil-en-Valois (60031)
7. Avilly-Saint-Léonard (60033)
8. Balagny-sur-Thérain (60044)
9. Barbery (60045)
10. Bargny (60046)
11. Baron (60047)
12. Beaurepaire (60056)
13. Belle-Église (60060)
14. Béthancourt-en-Valois (60066)
15. Béthisy-Saint-Martin (60067)
16. Béthisy-Saint-Pierre (60068)
17. Betz (60069)
18. Blaincourt-lès-Précy (60074)
19. Boissy-Fresnoy (60079)
20. Bonneuil-en-Valois (60083)
21. Boran-sur-Oise (60086)
22. Borest (60087)
23. Bouillancy (60091)
24. Boullarre (60092)
25. Boursonne (60094)
26. Brasseuse (60100)
27. Brégy (60101)
28. Chamant (60138)
29. Chambly (60139)
30. Chantilly (60141)
31. La Chapelle-en-Serval (60142)
32. Chèvreville (60148)
33. Cires-lès-Mello (60155)
34. Courteuil (60170)
35. Coye-la-Forêt (60172)
36. Cramoisy (60173)
37. Creil (60175)
38. Crépy-en-Valois (60176)
39. Crouy-en-Thelle (60185)
40. Cuvergnon (60190)
41. Dieudonné (60197)
42. Duvy (60203)
43. Éméville (60207)
44. Ercuis (60212)
45. Ermenonville (60213)
46. Étavigny (60224)
47. Ève (60226)
48. Feigneux (60231)
49. Fleurines (60238)
50. Fontaine-Chaalis (60241)
51. Foulangues (60249)
52. Fresnoy-en-Thelle (60259)
53. Fresnoy-la-Rivière (60260)
54. Fresnoy-le-Luat (60261)
55. Gilocourt (60272)
56. Glaignes (60274)
57. Gondreville (60279)
58. Gouvieux (60282)
59. Ivors (60320)
60. Lagny-le-Sec (60341)
61. Lamorlaye (60346)
62. Lévignen (60358)
63. Mareuil-sur-Ourcq (60380)
64. Marolles (60385)
65. Maysel (60391)
66. Mello (60393)
67. Le Mesnil-en-Thelle (60398)
68. Montagny-Sainte-Félicité (60413)
69. Montataire (60414)
70. Montépilloy (60415)
71. Mont-l'Évêque (60421)
72. Montlognon (60422)
73. Morangles (60429)
74. Morienval (60430)
75. Mortefontaine (60432)
76. Nanteuil-le-Haudouin (60446)
77. Néry (60447)
78. Neufchelles (60448)
79. Neuilly-en-Thelle (60450)
80. Nogent-sur-Oise (60463)
81. Ognes (60473)
82. Ormoy-le-Davien (60478)
83. Ormoy-Villers (60479)
84. Orrouy (60481)
85. Orry-la-Ville (60482)
86. Péroy-les-Gombries (60489)
87. Plailly (60494)
88. Le Plessis-Belleville (60500)
89. Pontarmé (60505)
90. Pontpoint (60508)
91. Pont-Sainte-Maxence (60509)
92. Précy-sur-Oise (60513)
93. Puiseux-le-Hauberger (60517)
94. Raray (60525)
95. Réez-Fosse-Martin (60527)
96. Rhuis (60536)
97. Roberval (60541)
98. Rocquemont (60543)
99. Rosières (60546)
100. Rosoy-en-Multien (60548)
101. Rouville (60552)
102. Rouvres-en-Multien (60554)
103. Rully (60560)
104. Russy-Bémont (60561)
105. Saintines (60578)
106. Saint-Leu-d'Esserent (60584)
107. Saint-Maximin (60589)
108. Saint-Vaast-de-Longmont (60600)
109. Saint-Vaast-lès-Mello (60601)
110. Senlis (60612)
111. Séry-Magneval (60618)
112. Silly-le-Long (60619)
113. Thiers-sur-Thève (60631)
114. Thiverny (60635)
115. Thury-en-Valois (60637)
116. Trumilly (60650)
117. Ully-Saint-Georges (60651)
118. Varinfroy (60656)
119. Vauciennes (60658)
120. Vaumoise (60661)
121. Verberie (60667)
122. Verneuil-en-Halatte (60670)
123. Versigny (60671)
124. Ver-sur-Launette (60666)
125. Vez (60672)
126. La Villeneuve-sous-Thury (60679)
127. Villeneuve-sur-Verberie (60680)
128. Villers-Saint-Frambourg-Ognon (60682)
129. Villers-Saint-Genest (60683)
130. Villers-Saint-Paul (60684)
131. Villers-sous-Saint-Leu (60686)
132. Vineuil-Saint-Firmin (60695)

== History ==
The arrondissement of Senlis was created in 1800.

As a result of the reorganisation of the cantons of France which came into effect in 2015, the borders of the cantons are no longer related to the borders of the arrondissements. The cantons of the arrondissement of Senlis were, as of January 2015:

1. Betz
2. Chantilly
3. Creil-Nogent-sur-Oise
4. Creil-Sud
5. Crépy-en-Valois
6. Montataire
7. Nanteuil-le-Haudouin
8. Neuilly-en-Thelle
9. Pont-Sainte-Maxence
10. Senlis
