= Bémont =

Bémont may refer to:

- Le Bémont - municipality in the district of Franches-Montagnes in the canton of Jura in Switzerland.
- Russy-Bémont - French commune in the Oise department in northern France

== People ==
- Charles Bémont - French scholar, born in Paris
