= Rocquemont =

Rocquemont may refer to the following places in France:

- Rocquemont, Oise, a commune in the Oise department
- Rocquemont, Seine-Maritime, a commune in the Seine-Maritime department
