= Saintines =

- Commune
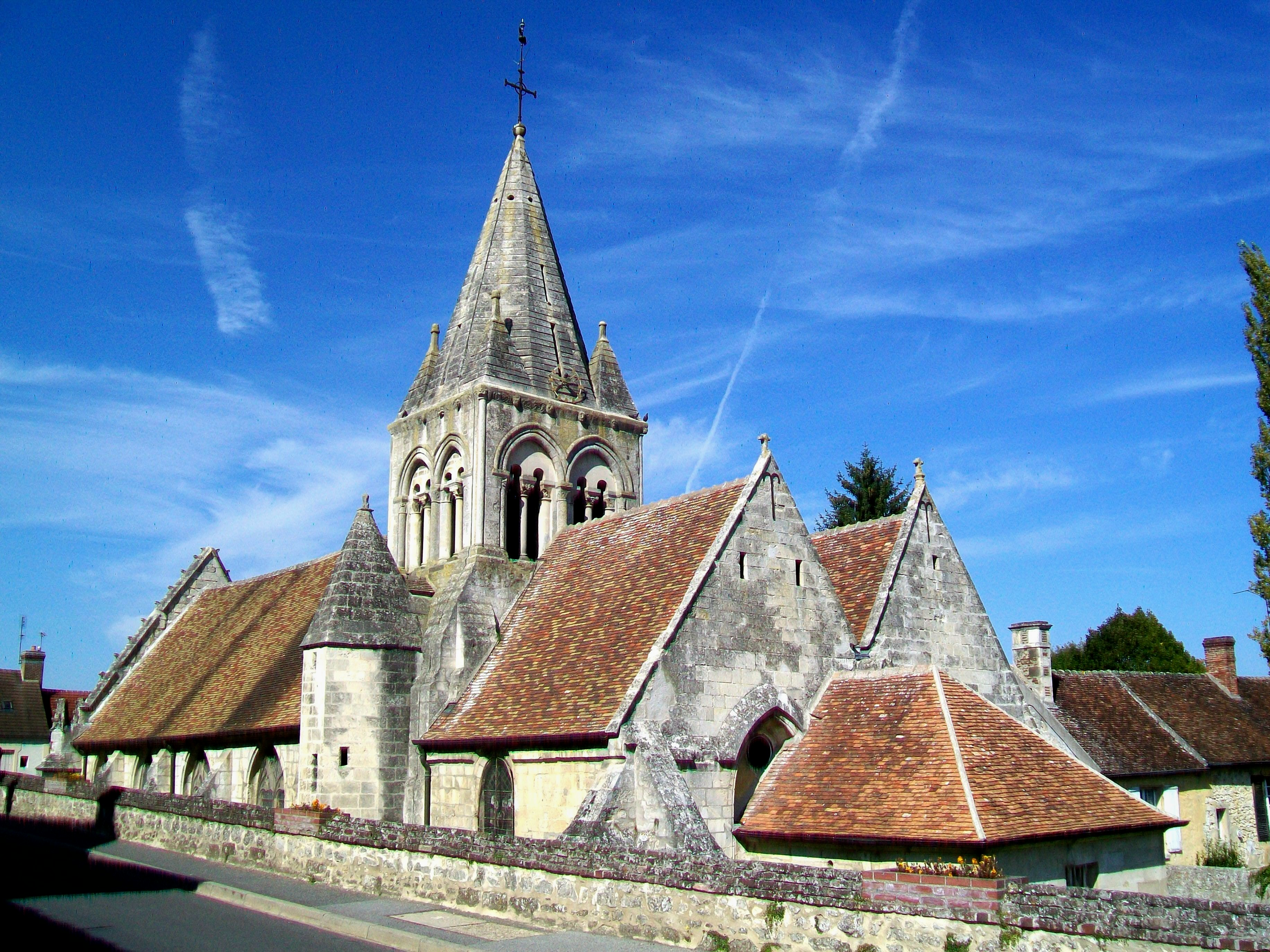
- The church in Saintines
- Location of Saintines
- Location within France Location within Hauts-de-France
- Coordinates: 49°18′26″N 2°46′12″E
- Country: France
- Region: Hauts-de-France
- Department: Oise
- Arrondissement: Senlis
- Canton: Crépy-en-Valois
- Intercommunality: CA Région de Compiègne et Basse Automne

Government
  - Mayor (2020–2026): Jean-Pierre Desmoulins
- Area^{1}: 2.87 km^{2} (1.11 sq mi)
- Elevation: 37 m (121 ft)
- Highest elevation: 123 m (404 ft)
- Lowest elevation: 34 m (112 ft)
- Population (2023): 1,060
  - Density: 369/km^{2} (957/sq mi)
- Time zone: UTC+01:00 (CET)
  - Summer (DST): UTC+02:00 (CEST)
- INSEE/Postal code: 60578 /60410
- ^{1} French Land Register data, which excludes lakes, ponds, glaciers > 1 km^{2} (0.386 sq mi or 247 acres) and river estuaries.

Saintines (French pronunciation: [sɛ̃tin]) is a commune in the Oise department in northern France.

== See also ==
- Communes of the Oise department
