= Bonneuil-en-Valois =

- Commune
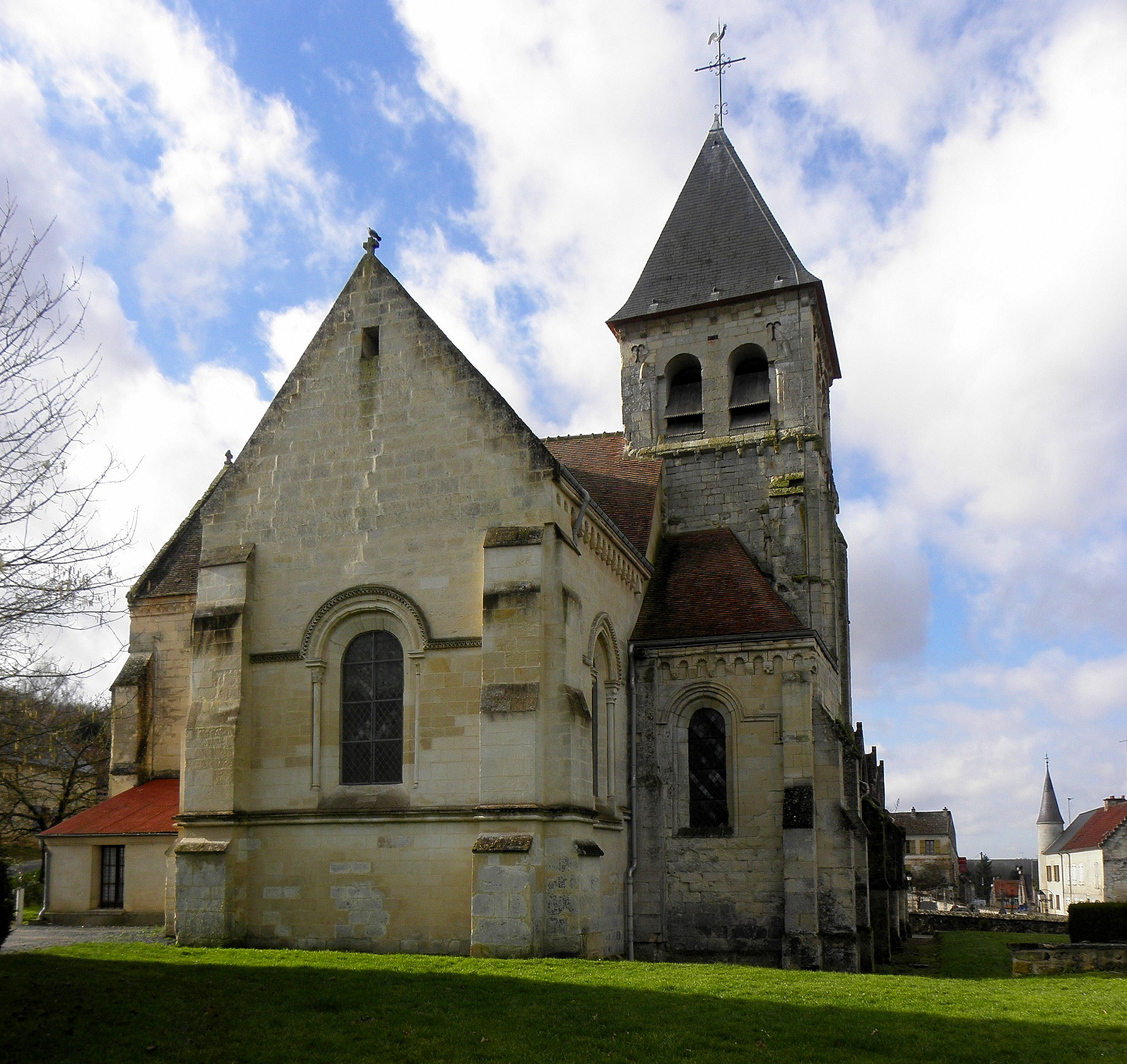
- The church in Bonneuil-en-Valois
- Location of Bonneuil-en-Valois
- Location within France Location within Hauts-de-France
- Coordinates: 49°17′08″N 2°59′40″E
- Country: France
- Region: Hauts-de-France
- Department: Oise
- Arrondissement: Senlis
- Canton: Crépy-en-Valois
- Intercommunality: Pays de Valois

Government
  - Mayor (2020–2026): Gilles Laveur
- Area^{1}: 12.81 km^{2} (4.95 sq mi)
- Elevation: 162 m (531 ft)
- Highest elevation: 166 m (545 ft)
- Lowest elevation: 57 m (187 ft)
- Population (2023): 986
  - Density: 77.0/km^{2} (199/sq mi)
- Time zone: UTC+01:00 (CET)
  - Summer (DST): UTC+02:00 (CEST)
- INSEE/Postal code: 60083 /60123
- ^{1} French Land Register data, which excludes lakes, ponds, glaciers > 1 km^{2} (0.386 sq mi or 247 acres) and river estuaries.

Bonneuil-en-Valois (French pronunciation: [bɔnœj ɑ̃ valwa], lit. 'Bonneuil in Valois') is a commune in the Oise department in northern France.

== Population ==
Historical population
Year	Pop.	±% p.a.
1968	778	—
1975	692	−1.66%
1982	788	+1.87%
1990	817	+0.45%
1999	895	+1.02%
2007	977	+1.10%
2012	1,050	+1.45%
2017	1,025	−0.48%
2023	986	−0.64%
Source: INSEE

== See also ==
- Communes of the Oise department
