= Saint-Vaast-de-Longmont =

- Commune
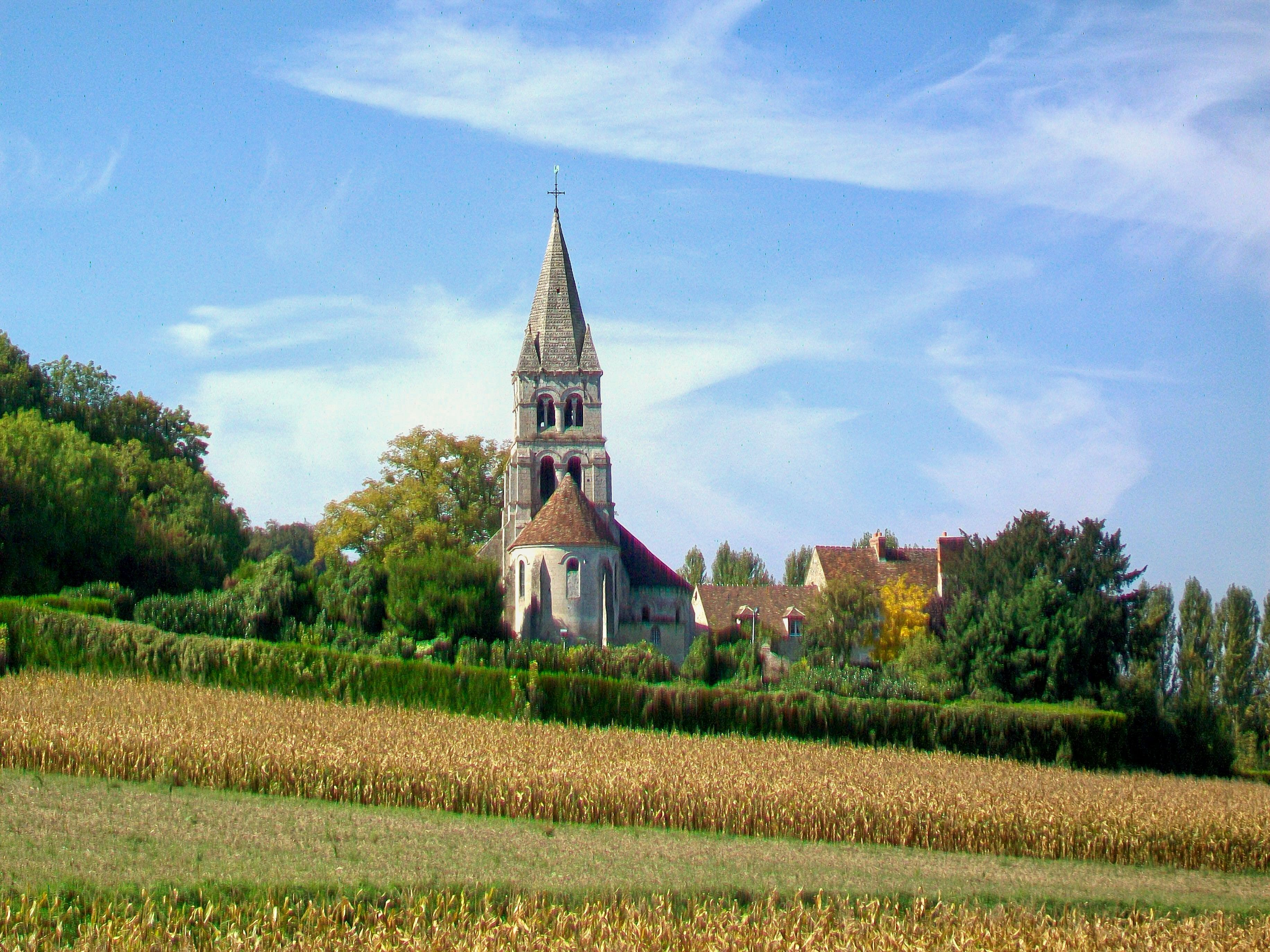
- The church in Saint-Vaast-de-Longmont
- Location of Saint-Vaast-de-Longmont
- Location within France Location within Hauts-de-France
- Coordinates: 49°18′13″N 2°44′13″E
- Country: France
- Region: Hauts-de-France
- Department: Oise
- Arrondissement: Senlis
- Canton: Crépy-en-Valois
- Intercommunality: CA Région de Compiègne et Basse Automne

Government
  - Mayor (2020–2026): Gilbert Bouteille
- Area^{1}: 4.9 km^{2} (1.9 sq mi)
- Elevation: 45 m (148 ft)
- Highest elevation: 126 m (413 ft)
- Lowest elevation: 34 m (112 ft)
- Population (2023): 654
  - Density: 130/km^{2} (350/sq mi)
- Time zone: UTC+01:00 (CET)
  - Summer (DST): UTC+02:00 (CEST)
- INSEE/Postal code: 60600 /60410
- ^{1} French Land Register data, which excludes lakes, ponds, glaciers > 1 km^{2} (0.386 sq mi or 247 acres) and river estuaries.

Saint-Vaast-de-Longmont (French pronunciation: [sɛ̃ va(st) də lɔ̃mɔ̃]) is a commune in the Oise department in northern France.

== See also ==
- Communes of the Oise department
