= Vez, Oise =

Vez
- Commune
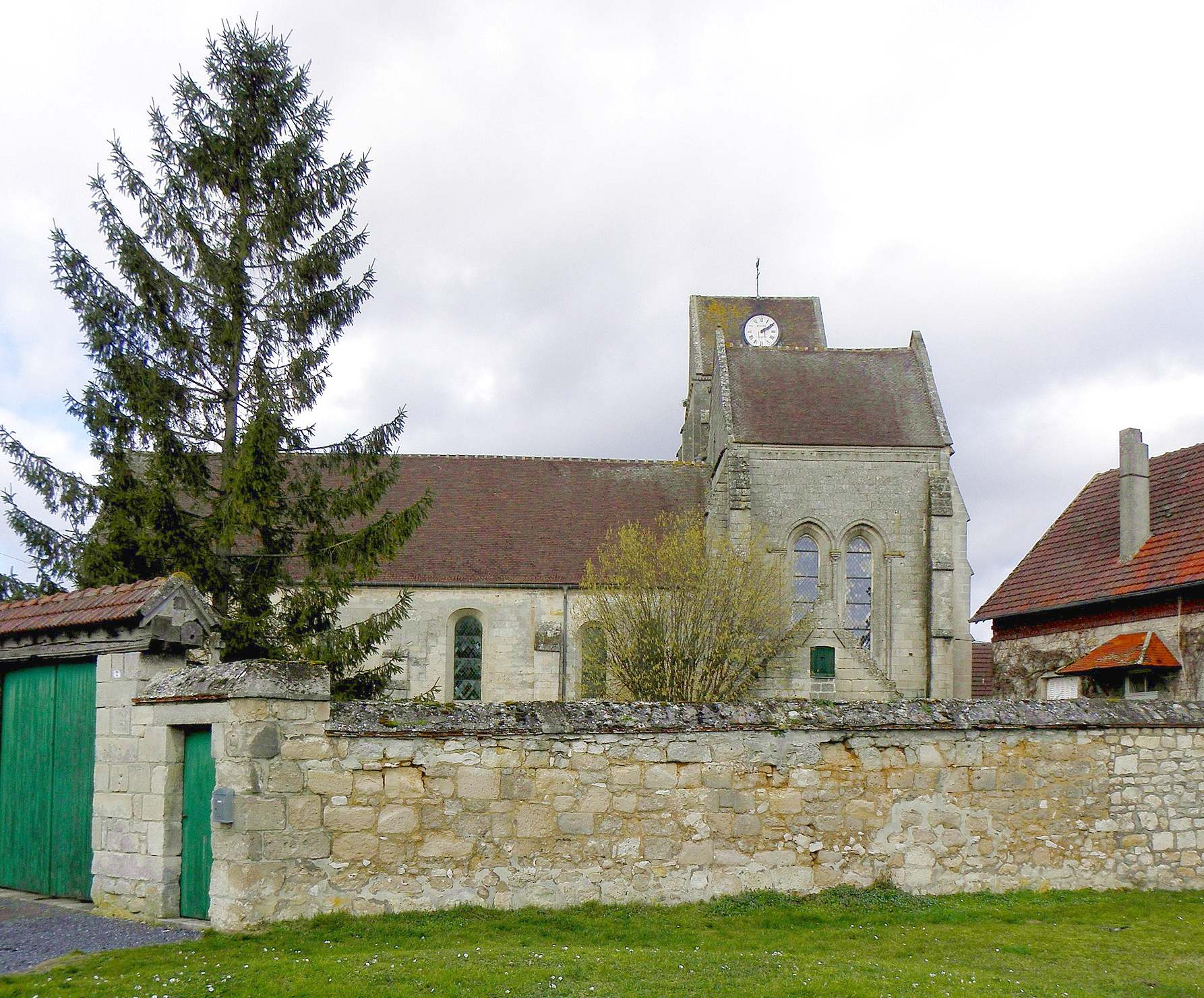
- The church in Vez
- Location of Vez
- Location within France Location within Hauts-de-France
- Coordinates: 49°15′52″N 3°00′12″E
- Country: France
- Region: Hauts-de-France
- Department: Oise
- Arrondissement: Senlis
- Canton: Crépy-en-Valois
- Intercommunality: Pays de Valois

Government
  - Mayor (2020–2026): Thiery Michalowski
- Area^{1}: 10.88 km^{2} (4.20 sq mi)
- Elevation: 120 m (390 ft)
- Highest elevation: 147 m (482 ft)
- Lowest elevation: 65 m (213 ft)
- Population (2023): 285
  - Density: 26.2/km^{2} (67.8/sq mi)
- Time zone: UTC+01:00 (CET)
  - Summer (DST): UTC+02:00 (CEST)
- INSEE/Postal code: 60672 /60117
- ^{1} French Land Register data, which excludes lakes, ponds, glaciers > 1 km^{2} (0.386 sq mi or 247 acres) and river estuaries.

Vez (French pronunciation: [ve]) is a commune in the Oise department in northern France. As of 2023, the population of the commune was 285.

== See also ==
- Communes of the Oise department
