= Thury-en-Valois =

- Commune
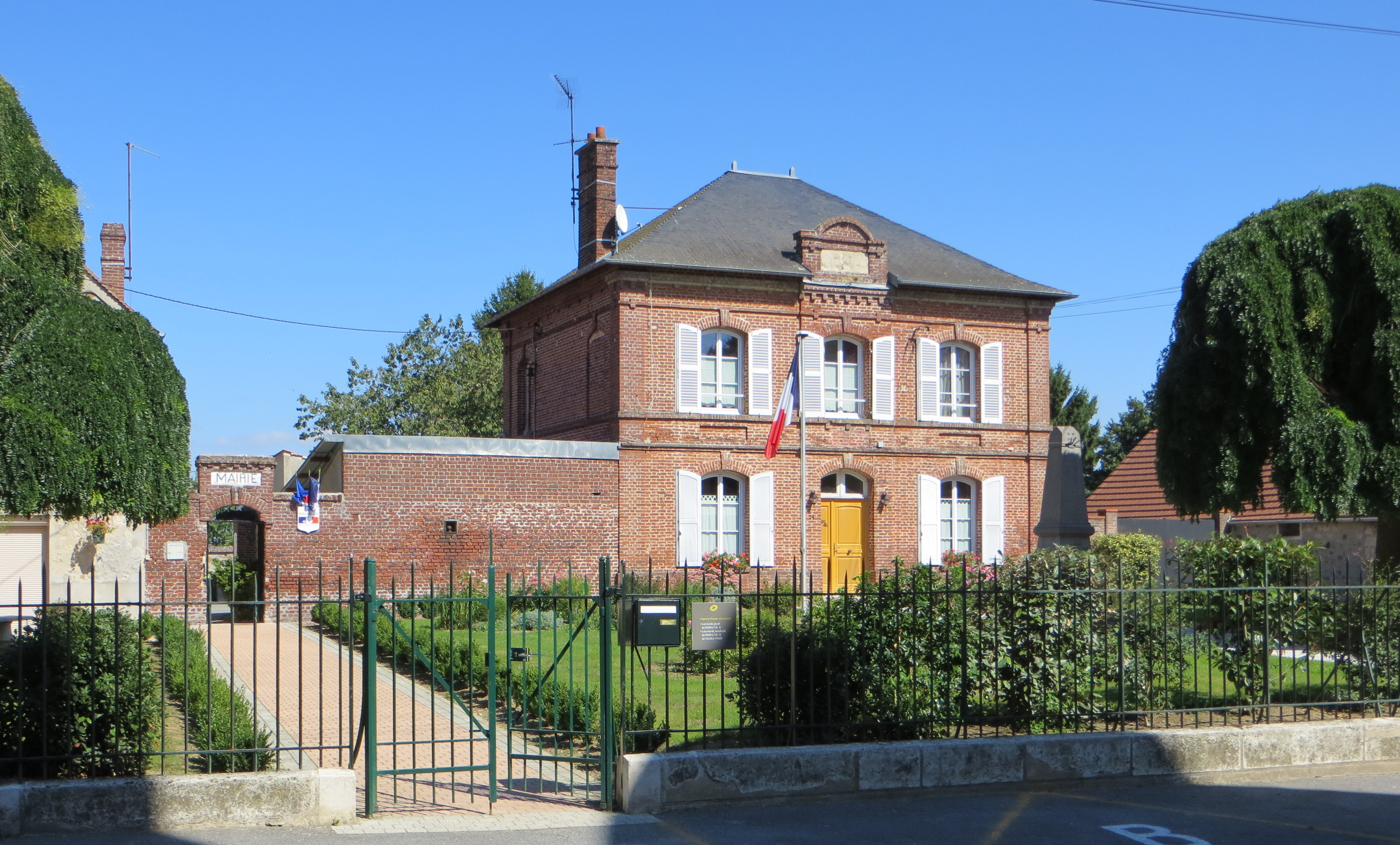
- The town hall in Thury-en-Valois

- Coat of arms
- Location of Thury-en-Valois
- Location within France Location within Hauts-de-France
- Coordinates: 49°09′27″N 3°01′31″E
- Country: France
- Region: Hauts-de-France
- Department: Oise
- Arrondissement: Senlis
- Canton: Nanteuil-le-Haudouin
- Intercommunality: Pays de Valois

Government
  - Mayor (2020–2026): Jérôme Margottet
- Area^{1}: 11.26 km^{2} (4.35 sq mi)
- Elevation: 140 m (460 ft)
- Highest elevation: 142 m (466 ft)
- Lowest elevation: 64 m (210 ft)
- Population (2023): 462
  - Density: 41.0/km^{2} (106/sq mi)
- Time zone: UTC+01:00 (CET)
  - Summer (DST): UTC+02:00 (CEST)
- INSEE/Postal code: 60637 /60890
- ^{1} French Land Register data, which excludes lakes, ponds, glaciers > 1 km^{2} (0.386 sq mi or 247 acres) and river estuaries.

Thury-en-Valois (French pronunciation: [tyʁi ɑ̃ valwa], lit. 'Thury in Valois') is a commune in the Oise department in northern France.

== See also ==
- Communes of the Oise department
