= Vaumoise =

- Commune
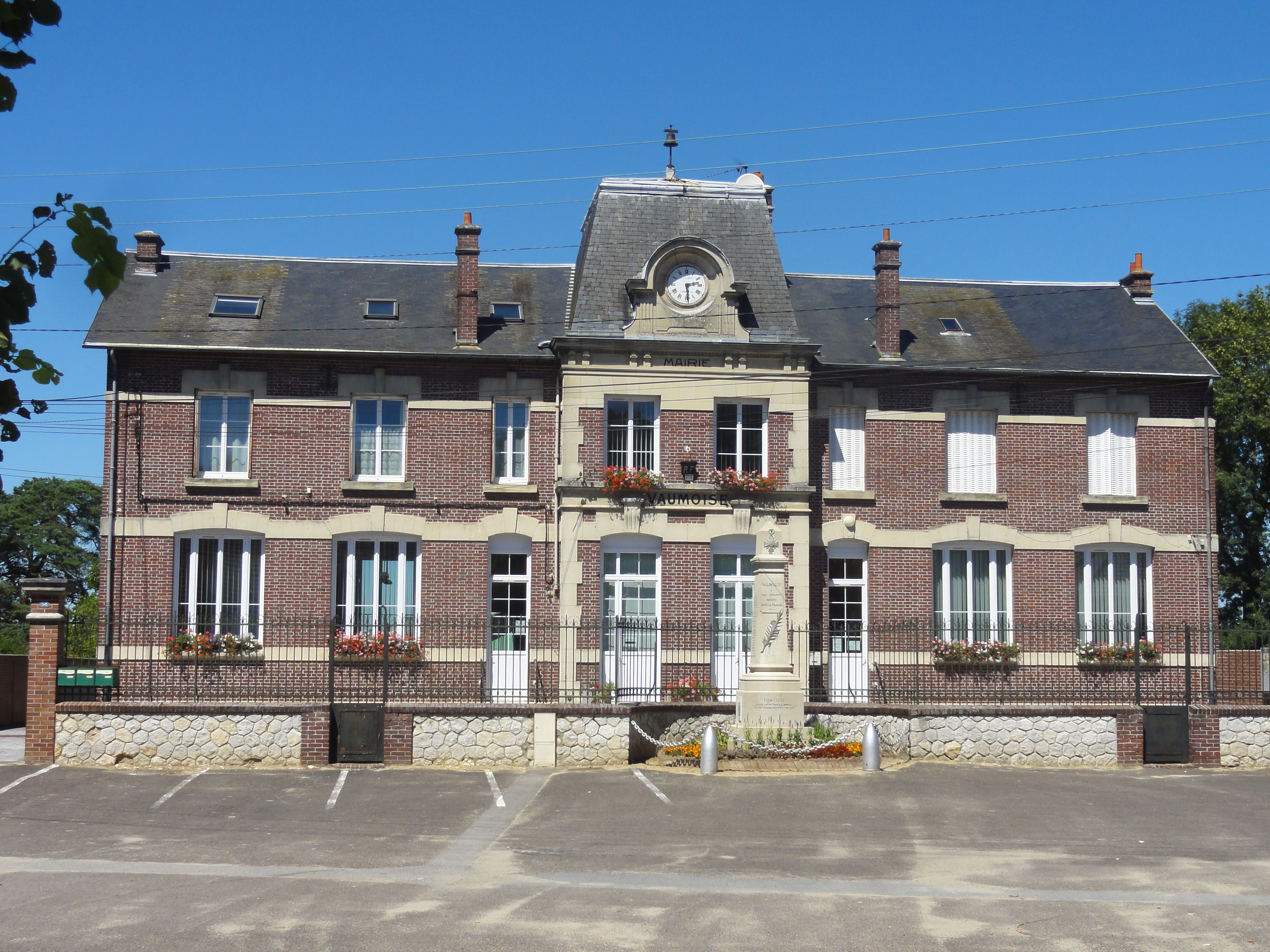
- The town hall in Vaumoise
- Location of Vaumoise
- Location within France Location within Hauts-de-France
- Coordinates: 49°14′15″N 2°58′50″E
- Country: France
- Region: Hauts-de-France
- Department: Oise
- Arrondissement: Senlis
- Canton: Crépy-en-Valois
- Intercommunality: Pays de Valois

Government
  - Mayor (2020–2026): Franck Gillet
- Area^{1}: 3.13 km^{2} (1.21 sq mi)
- Elevation: 110 m (360 ft)
- Highest elevation: 123 m (404 ft)
- Lowest elevation: 66 m (217 ft)
- Population (2023): 998
  - Density: 319/km^{2} (826/sq mi)
- Time zone: UTC+01:00 (CET)
  - Summer (DST): UTC+02:00 (CEST)
- INSEE/Postal code: 60661 /60117
- ^{1} French Land Register data, which excludes lakes, ponds, glaciers > 1 km^{2} (0.386 sq mi or 247 acres) and river estuaries.

Vaumoise (French pronunciation: [vomwaz]) is a commune in the Oise department in northern France.

== See also ==
- Communes of the Oise department
