= Athboy railway station =

Former railway station in Ireland

Coordinates: 53.6221°N 6.9138°W

Athboy Baile Átha Buí
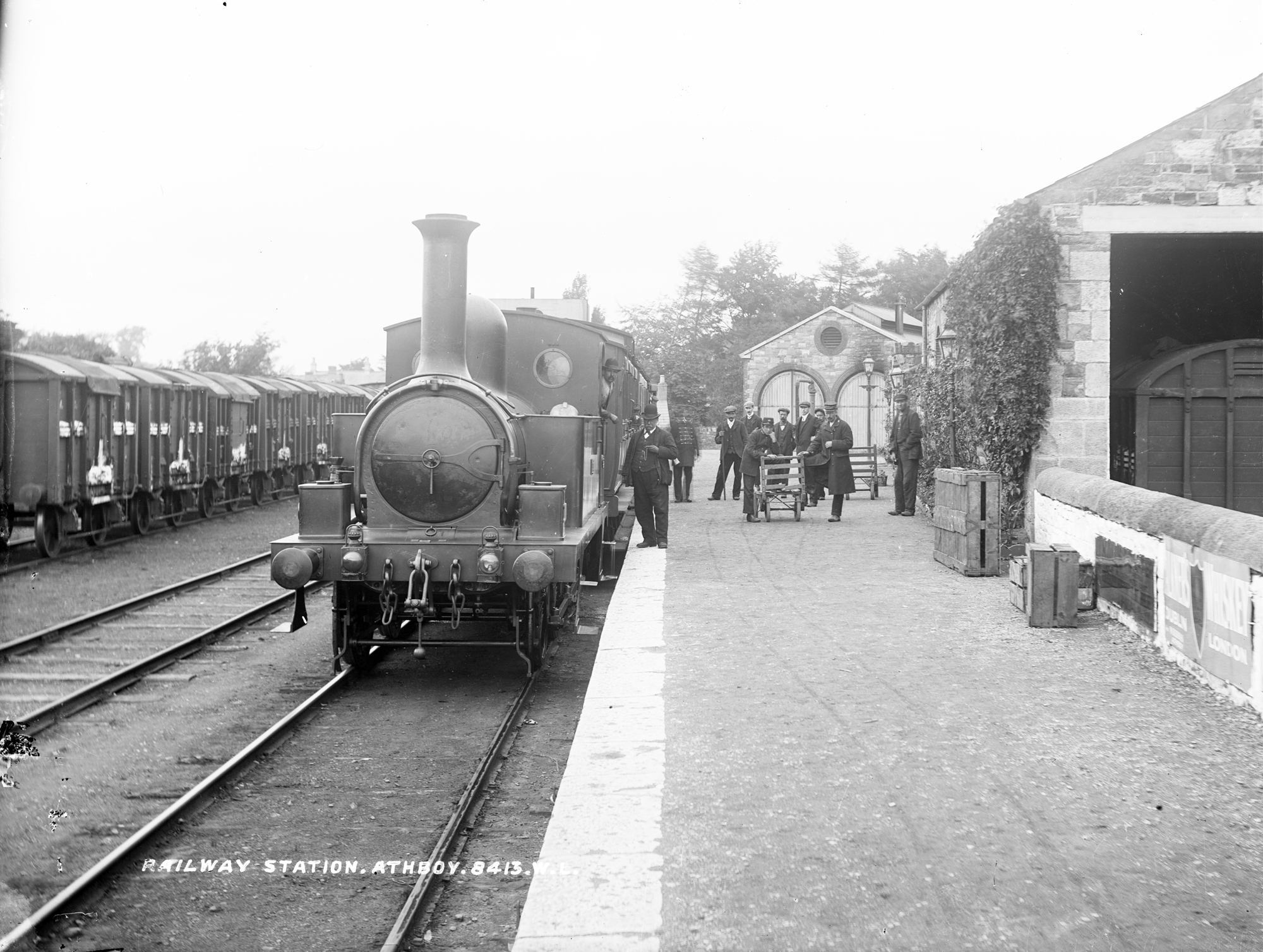
- The station, circa 1900

General information
- Location: Navan, County Meath; Ireland

History
- Opened: 26 February 1864
- Closed: 25 January 1947
- Original company: Dublin and Meath Railway
- Pre-grouping: Midland Great Western Railway
- Post-grouping: Great Southern Railways

Services
Preceding station	Disused railways	Following station
Trim	Midland Great Western Railway; Athboy branch	Terminus
Location
- Location within Ireland

Athboy railway station was the terminus of a branch line which diverged from the Dublin to Navan line at Kilmessan Junction and served the village of Athboy in County Meath, Ireland.

== History ==
Opened by the Dublin and Meath Railway, the station was absorbed by the Midland Great Western Railway, and so joined the Great Southern Railways.

The station was then nationalised, passing on to the Córas Iompair Éireann as a result of the Transport Act 1944 which took effect from 1 January 1945. It then closed under this management.
