= Éméville =

- Commune
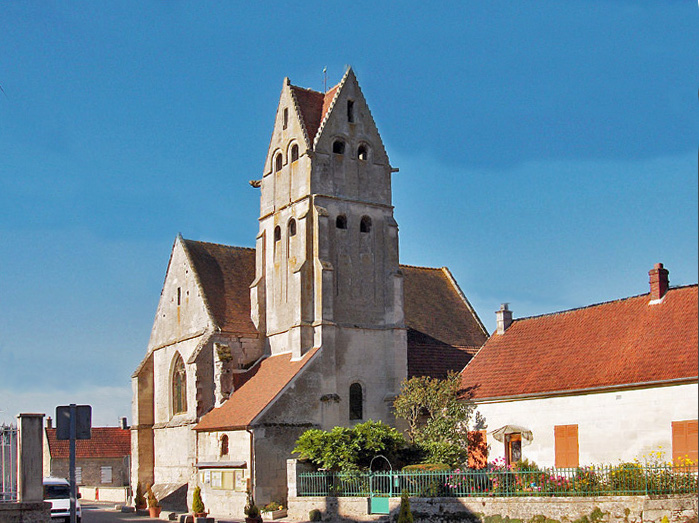
- St. Leodegar's Church
- Location of Éméville
- Location within France Location within Hauts-de-France
- Coordinates: 49°17′06″N 3°01′43″E
- Country: France
- Region: Hauts-de-France
- Department: Oise
- Arrondissement: Senlis
- Canton: Crépy-en-Valois
- Intercommunality: Pays de Valois

Government
  - Mayor (2020–2026): Yvette Valun
- Area^{1}: 1.84 km^{2} (0.71 sq mi)
- Elevation: 144 m (472 ft)
- Highest elevation: 165 m (541 ft)
- Lowest elevation: 114 m (374 ft)
- Population (2023): 283
  - Density: 154/km^{2} (398/sq mi)
- Time zone: UTC+01:00 (CET)
  - Summer (DST): UTC+02:00 (CEST)
- INSEE/Postal code: 60207 /60123
- ^{1} French Land Register data, which excludes lakes, ponds, glaciers > 1 km^{2} (0.386 sq mi or 247 acres) and river estuaries.

Éméville (French pronunciation: [emevil]) is a commune in the Oise department in northern France.

== See also ==
- Communes of the Oise department
