= Vauciennes, Oise =

Vauciennes
- Commune
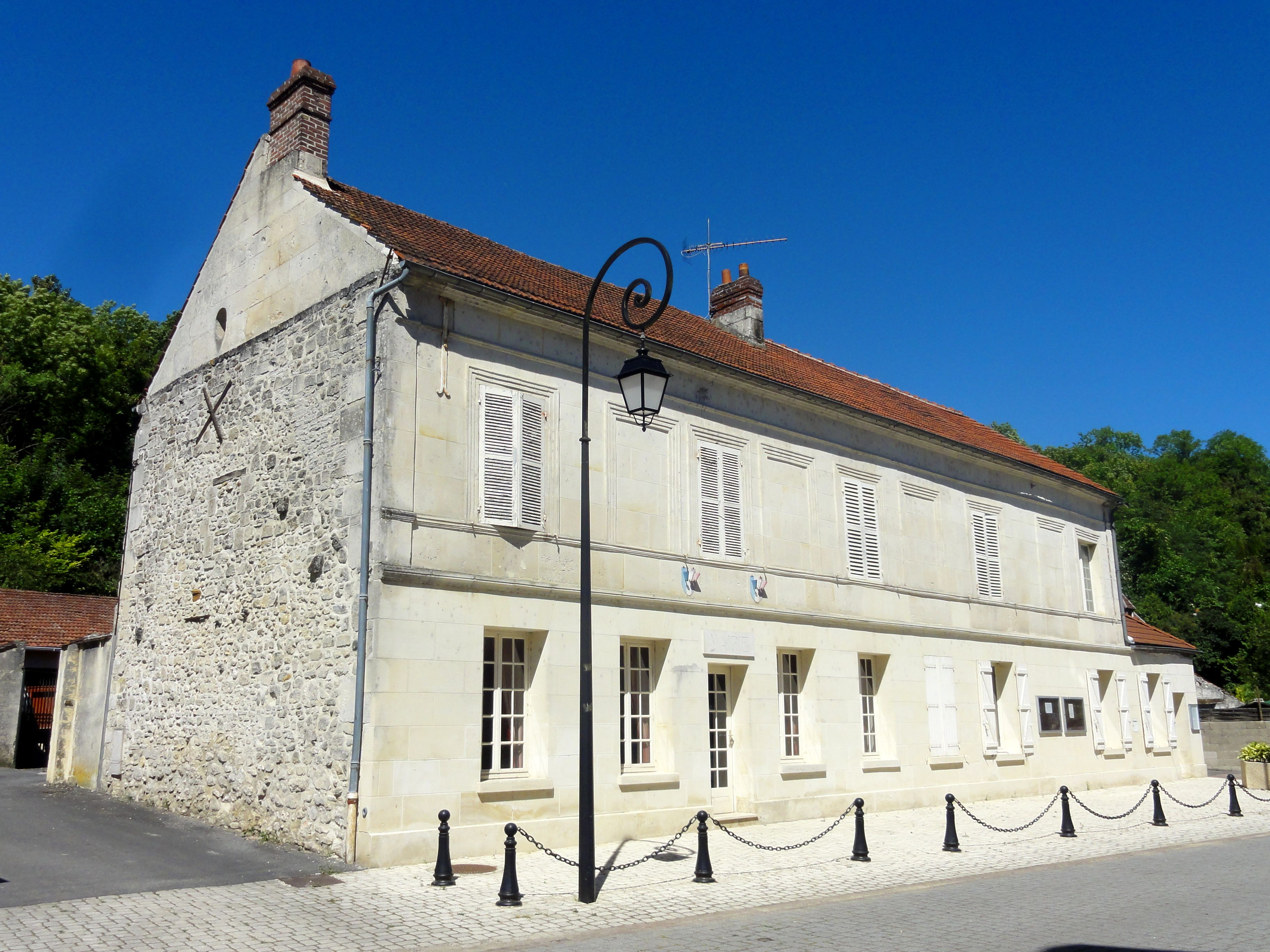
- The town hall in Vauciennes
- Location of Vauciennes
- Location within France Location within Hauts-de-France
- Coordinates: 49°14′14″N 3°01′52″E
- Country: France
- Region: Hauts-de-France
- Department: Oise
- Arrondissement: Senlis
- Canton: Crépy-en-Valois
- Intercommunality: Pays de Valois

Government
  - Mayor (2020–2026): Roger Mora
- Area^{1}: 6.36 km^{2} (2.46 sq mi)
- Elevation: 118 m (387 ft)
- Highest elevation: 167 m (548 ft)
- Lowest elevation: 71 m (233 ft)
- Population (2023): 701
  - Density: 110/km^{2} (285/sq mi)
- Time zone: UTC+01:00 (CET)
  - Summer (DST): UTC+02:00 (CEST)
- INSEE/Postal code: 60658 /60117
- ^{1} French Land Register data, which excludes lakes, ponds, glaciers > 1 km^{2} (0.386 sq mi or 247 acres) and river estuaries.

Vauciennes (French pronunciation: [vosjɛn]) is a commune in the Oise department in northern France.

== See also ==
- Communes of the Oise department
