= Auger-Saint-Vincent =

- Commune
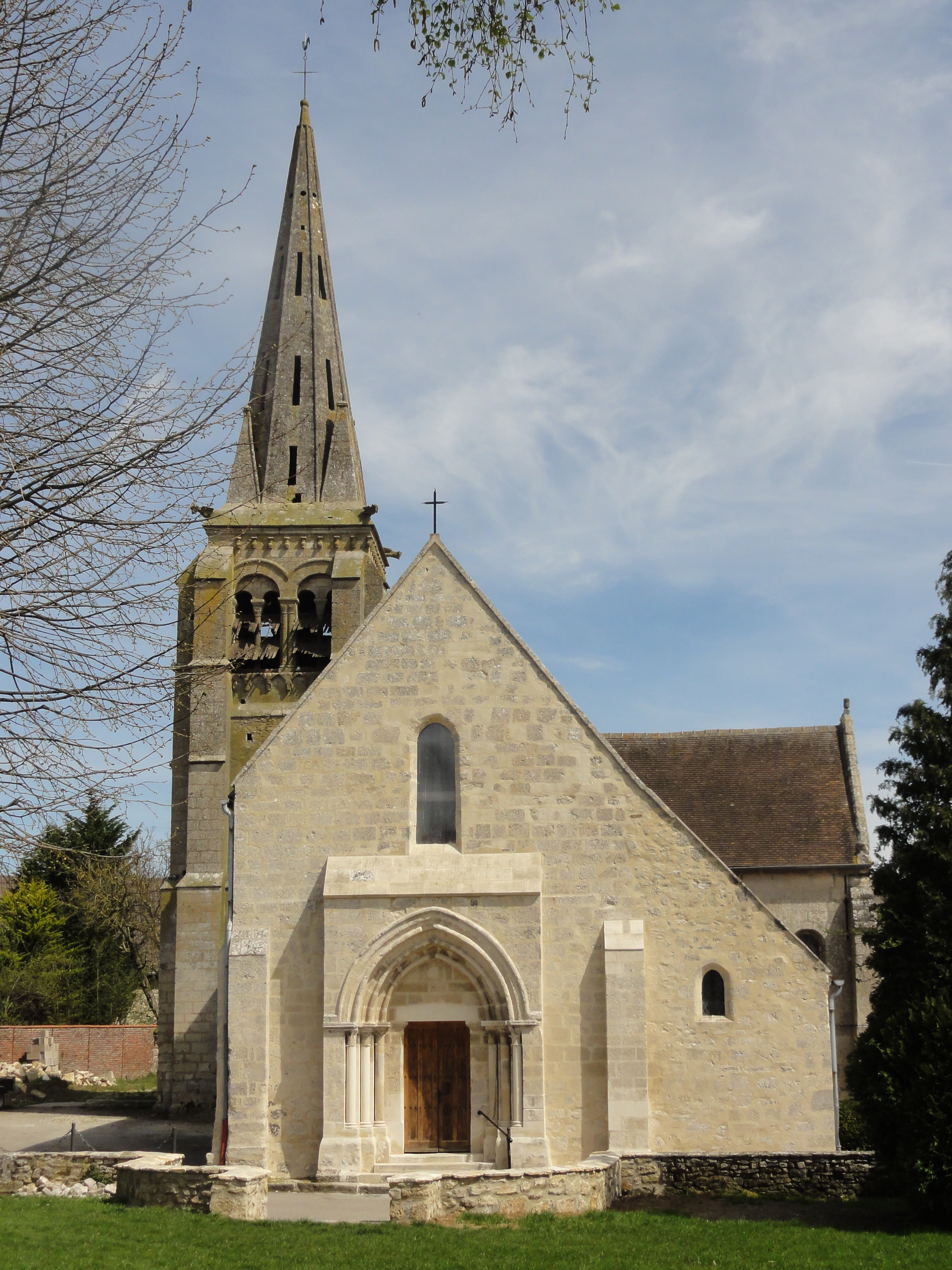
- The church in Auger-Saint-Vincent
- Location of Auger-Saint-Vincent
- Location within France Location within Hauts-de-France
- Coordinates: 49°13′10″N 2°48′32″E
- Country: France
- Region: Hauts-de-France
- Department: Oise
- Arrondissement: Senlis
- Canton: Crépy-en-Valois
- Intercommunality: CC Pays Valois

Government
  - Mayor (2020–2026): Fabrice Dalongeville
- Area^{1}: 13.97 km^{2} (5.39 sq mi)
- Elevation: 87 m (285 ft)
- Highest elevation: 135 m (443 ft)
- Lowest elevation: 73 m (240 ft)
- Population (2023): 515
  - Density: 36.9/km^{2} (95.5/sq mi)
- Time zone: UTC+01:00 (CET)
  - Summer (DST): UTC+02:00 (CEST)
- INSEE/Postal code: 60027 /60800
- ^{1} French Land Register data, which excludes lakes, ponds, glaciers > 1 km^{2} (0.386 sq mi or 247 acres) and river estuaries.

Auger-Saint-Vincent (French pronunciation: [oʒe sɛ̃ vɛ̃sɑ̃]) is a commune in the Oise department in northern France.

== Population ==
Historical population
Year	Pop.	±% p.a.
1968	342	—
1975	302	−1.76%
1982	324	+1.01%
1990	395	+2.51%
1999	439	+1.18%
2007	501	+1.67%
2012	492	−0.36%
2017	518	+1.04%
2023	515	−0.10%
Source: INSEE

== See also ==
- Communes of the Oise department
