= Duvy =

- Commune
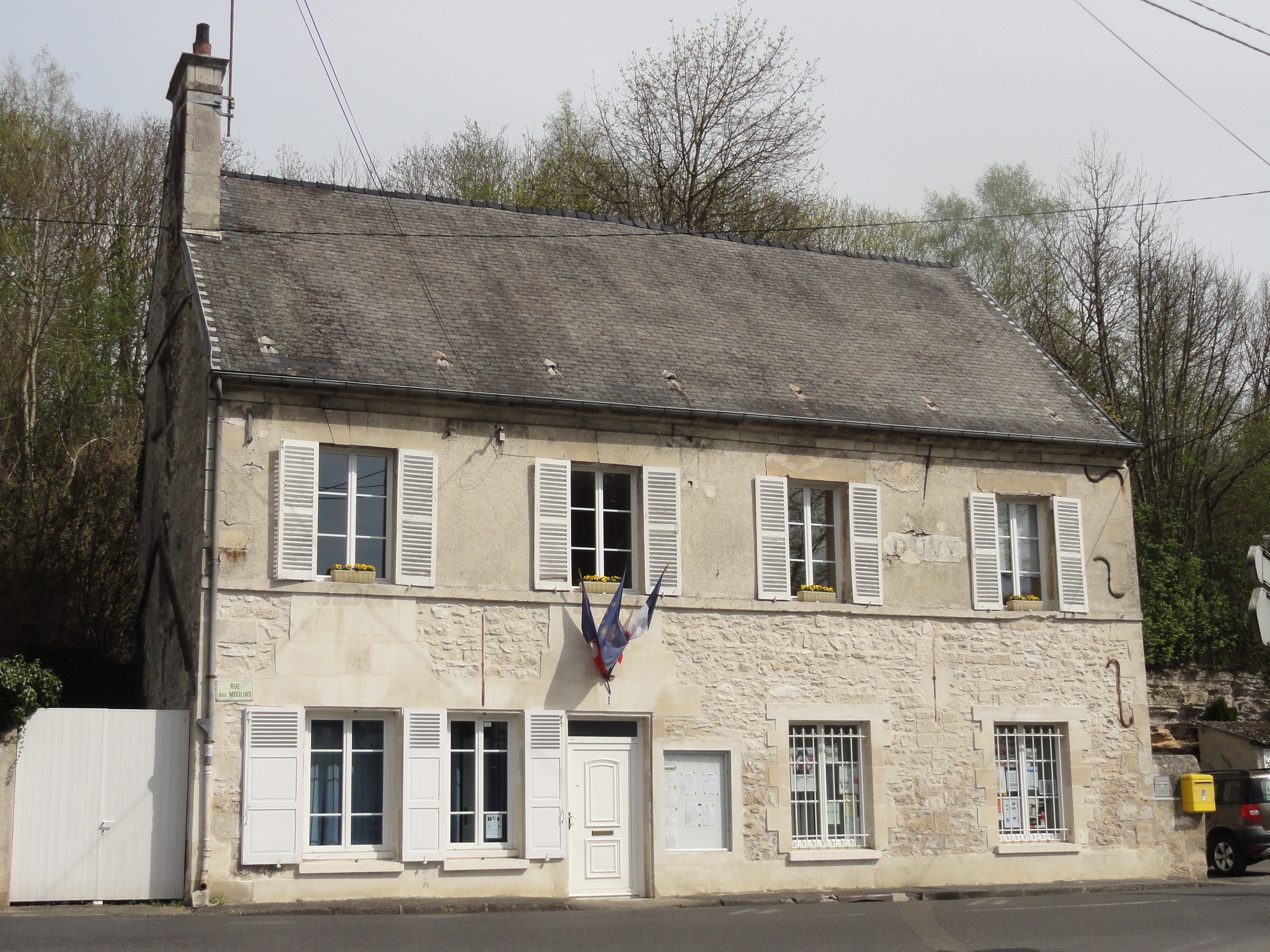
- The town hall in Duvy

- Coat of arms
- Location of Duvy
- Location within France Location within Hauts-de-France
- Coordinates: 49°14′12″N 2°51′21″E
- Country: France
- Region: Hauts-de-France
- Department: Oise
- Arrondissement: Senlis
- Canton: Crépy-en-Valois
- Intercommunality: Pays de Valois

Government
  - Mayor (2020–2026): André Dalle
- Area^{1}: 8.51 km^{2} (3.29 sq mi)
- Elevation: 69 m (226 ft)
- Highest elevation: 121 m (397 ft)
- Lowest elevation: 59 m (194 ft)
- Population (2023): 412
  - Density: 48.4/km^{2} (125/sq mi)
- Time zone: UTC+01:00 (CET)
  - Summer (DST): UTC+02:00 (CEST)
- INSEE/Postal code: 60203 /60800
- ^{1} French Land Register data, which excludes lakes, ponds, glaciers > 1 km^{2} (0.386 sq mi or 247 acres) and river estuaries.

Duvy (French pronunciation: [dyvi]) is a commune in the Oise department in northern France.

== See also ==
- Communes of the Oise department
