= Montagny-Sainte-Félicité =

- Commune
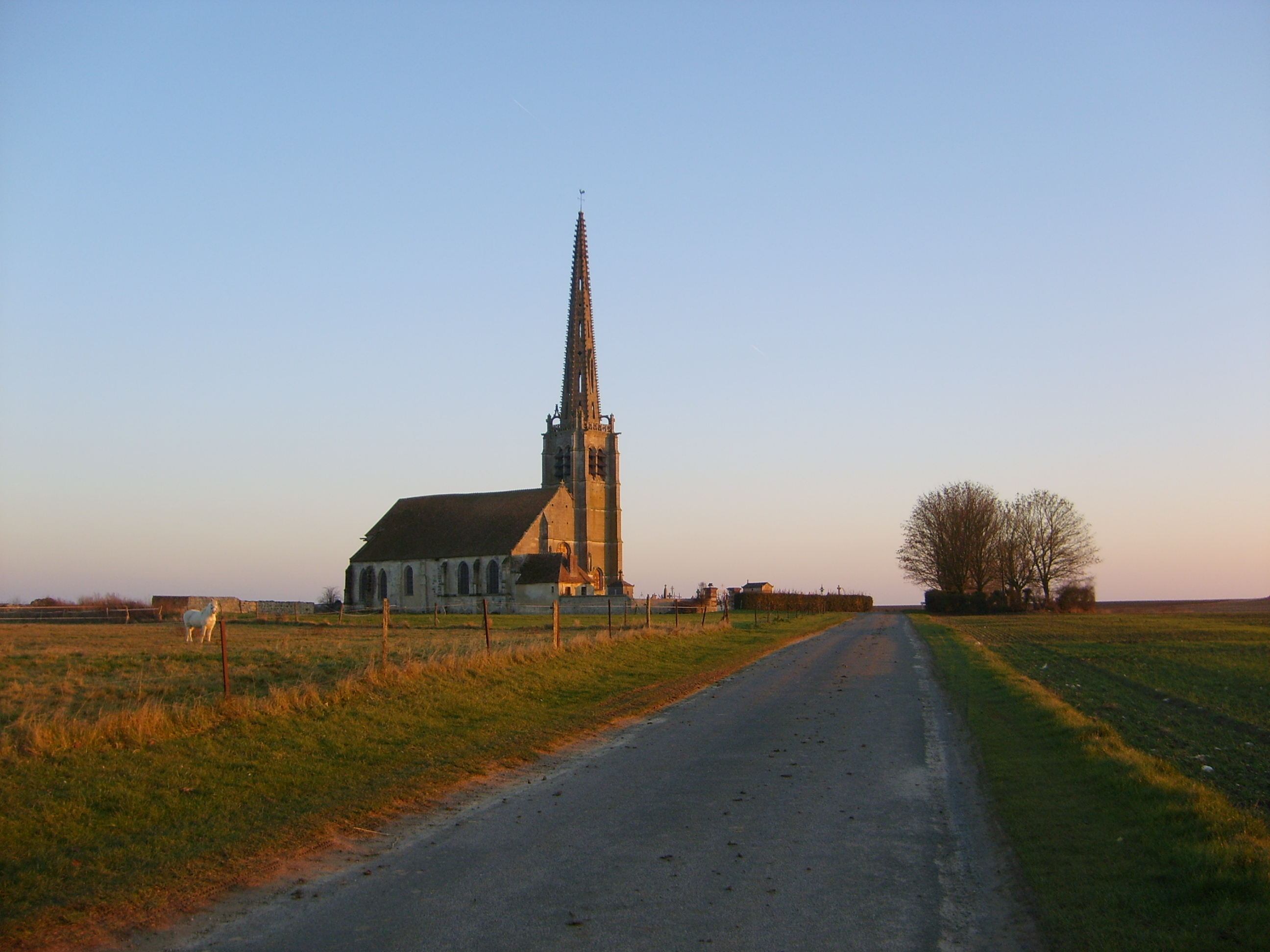
- The church in Montagny-Sainte-Félicité

- Coat of arms
- Location of Montagny-Sainte-Félicité
- Location within France Location within Hauts-de-France
- Coordinates: 49°07′52″N 2°44′21″E
- Country: France
- Region: Hauts-de-France
- Department: Oise
- Arrondissement: Senlis
- Canton: Nanteuil-le-Haudouin
- Intercommunality: Pays de Valois

Government
  - Mayor (2020–2026): Jean-Paul Douet
- Area^{1}: 5.67 km^{2} (2.19 sq mi)
- Elevation: 45 m (148 ft)
- Highest elevation: 124 m (407 ft)
- Lowest elevation: 100 m (330 ft)
- Population (2023): 425
  - Density: 75.0/km^{2} (194/sq mi)
- Time zone: UTC+01:00 (CET)
  - Summer (DST): UTC+02:00 (CEST)
- INSEE/Postal code: 60413 /60950
- ^{1} French Land Register data, which excludes lakes, ponds, glaciers > 1 km^{2} (0.386 sq mi or 247 acres) and river estuaries.

Montagny-Sainte-Félicité (French pronunciation: [mɔ̃taɲi sɛ̃t felisite]) is a commune in the Oise department in northern France.

== See also ==
- Communes of the Oise department
