= Trumilly =

- Commune
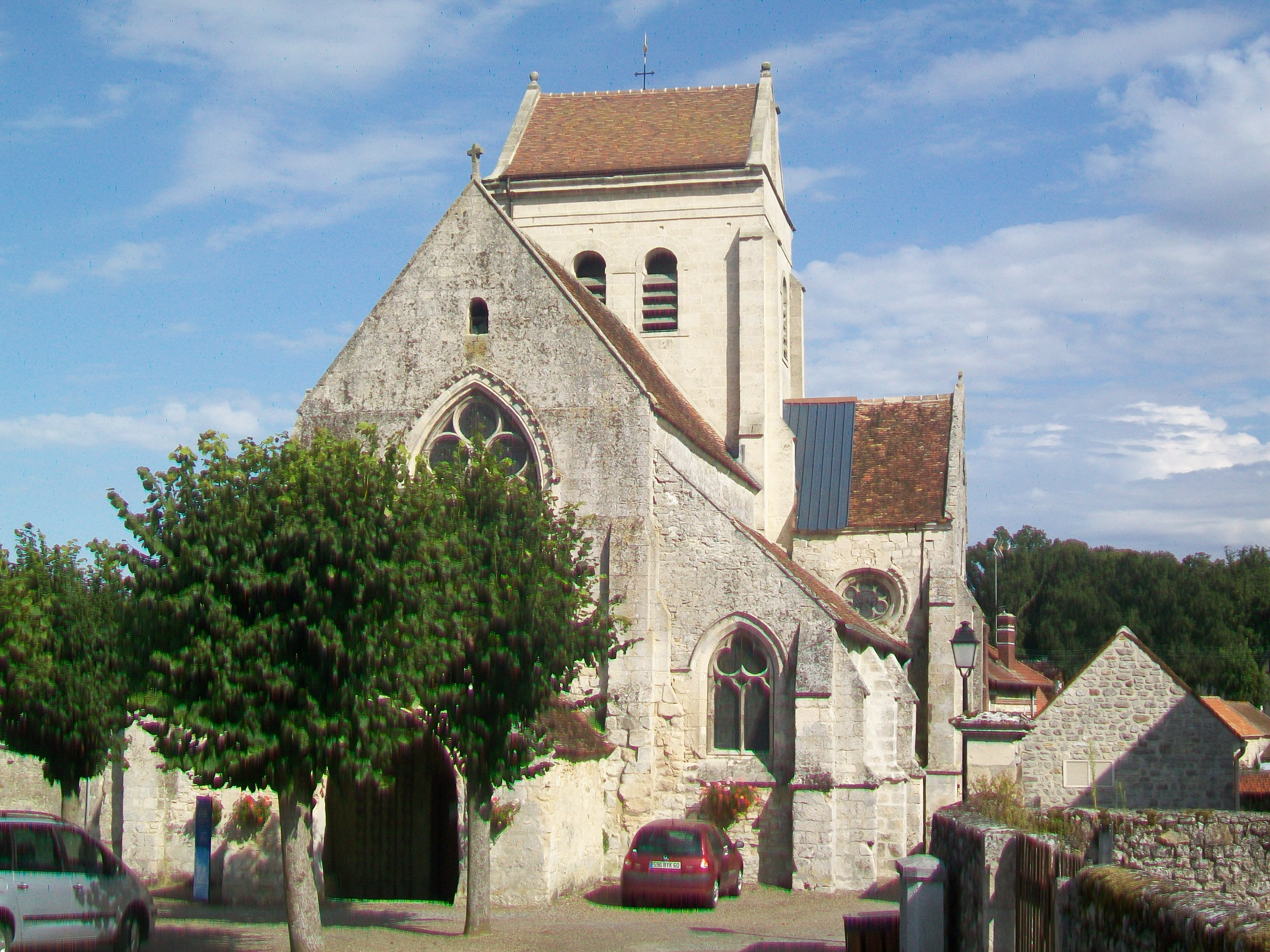
- The church in Trumilly
- Location of Trumilly
- Location within France Location within Hauts-de-France
- Coordinates: 49°14′36″N 2°48′11″E
- Country: France
- Region: Hauts-de-France
- Department: Oise
- Arrondissement: Senlis
- Canton: Crépy-en-Valois
- Intercommunality: Pays de Valois

Government
  - Mayor (2020–2026): Martine Lobin
- Area^{1}: 12.94 km^{2} (5.00 sq mi)
- Highest elevation: 155 m (509 ft)
- Lowest elevation: 88 m (289 ft)
- Population (2023): 522
  - Density: 40.3/km^{2} (104/sq mi)
- Time zone: UTC+01:00 (CET)
  - Summer (DST): UTC+02:00 (CEST)
- INSEE/Postal code: 60650 /60800
- ^{1} French Land Register data, which excludes lakes, ponds, glaciers > 1 km^{2} (0.386 sq mi or 247 acres) and river estuaries.

Trumilly (French pronunciation: [tʁymiji]) is a commune in the Oise department in northern France.

== See also ==
- Communes of the Oise department
