= Athboy RFC =

Rugby union club in County Meath, Ireland

(Ireland) Athboy
- Full name: Athboy Rugby Football Club
- Union: IRFU; Leinster
- Founded: 1978; 48 years ago
- Ground(s): Townspark, Athboy
Team kit

Athboy RFC is an Irish rugby team based in Athboy, County Meath, playing in Division 3 of the Leinster League. The club colours are red, purple and black.

== History ==
Athboy Rugby Football Club was founded in 1978. The initial season of 1978–79 constituted a series of friendlies but in the summer of 1979 the club was officially affiliated to the Leinster Branch of the IRFU.

Since its establishment, the club has played at both Junior 3 and 4 level. In the 1995–96 season, when the club failed to field a team for the first time since 1978, senior rugby activity was suspended. In the 1999–2000 season, sufficient numbers of players and interest resulted in a re-launch at J3 level and the addition of a women's team, later in that season.

In its history, Athboy has won five trophies. These have included four in the Magee Cup (North-East J3 League in 1987, 1988, 1990 and 2010) and one win in the Michael Dunne Cup (Provincial J4 in 1982). Playing as a Junior 4 side, the club had to wait three seasons before winning their first trophy, when they defeated Kilkenny in a replay of the Dunne Cup Final.

In 1982, the club sought and was granted by the Leinster Branch a "move up" to Junior 3. A second XV was started and the club then had up to 40 players and several officials. The decision subsequently was taken to locate to a new home and land was acquired on the edge of Athboy town. The two teams began playing there in 1986 and over £2000 was spent installing floodlights for training.

In the summer of 1999, a meeting was held with the aim of fielding again at senior level. This was achieved with a mixture of players who had played both at senior and underage level for the club plus several who had moved into the area and a few new recruits. As with the first team, the new team spent its first year playing friendlies and in the 2000–01 season played in the Provincial Thirds League, the Anderson Cup and the Dunne Cup. The Women's team was also started in 1999–00 season playing a number of friendlies and played in the National Conference in 2000–01. In the 2001–2002 season, the women's XV shared the All Ireland League Division 3 title with Trinity College and the following year lost out in an all-Meath final against Navan.

Several Athboy players represented Leinster at several levels, including underage, Women's U19, Women's Leinster B and the Senior Leinster Women's Team. This included former player Richie Feeney (who later played with UL Bohs), who made his Ireland U19 debut against England in 2004.

== Women's team ==
The Women's team was also started in 1999–00 season, playing a number of friendlies and played in the National Conference in 2000–01. In the 2001–02 season the women's XV shared the All Ireland League Division 3 title with Trinity College. The following year they lost out in an all Meath All-Ireland final against Navan.

== Roll of honour ==
- Michael Dunne Cup: 1982
- Magee Cup: 1987, 1988, 1990, 2010, 2011
- Women's All Ireland League Division 3: 2002
- Metro 11 League: 2023-24
