= Rocquemont, Oise =

Rocquemont
- Commune
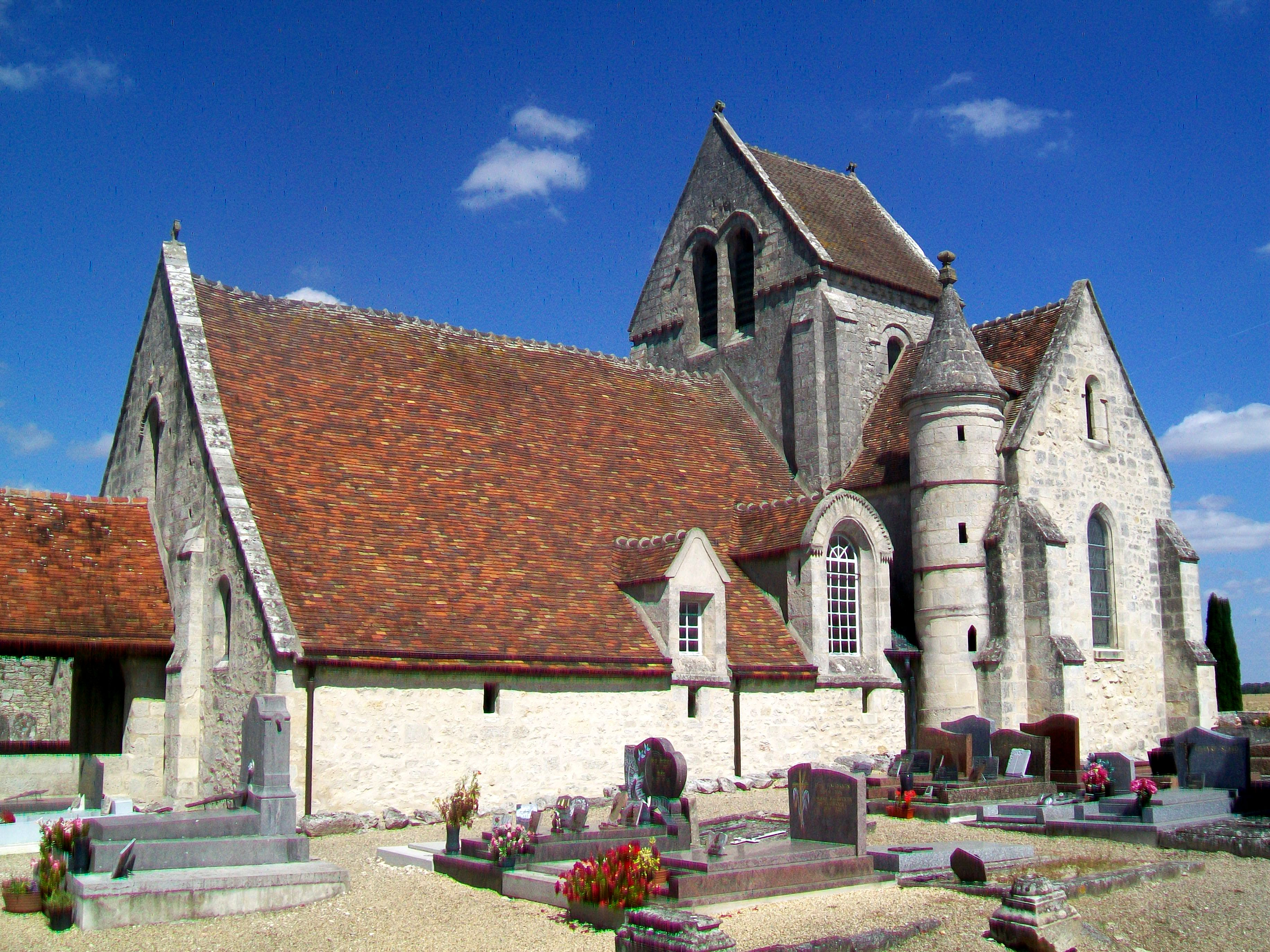
- The church in Rocquemont

- Coat of arms
- Location of Rocquemont
- Location within France Location within Hauts-de-France
- Coordinates: 49°15′34″N 2°49′09″E
- Country: France
- Region: Hauts-de-France
- Department: Oise
- Arrondissement: Senlis
- Canton: Crépy-en-Valois
- Intercommunality: Pays de Valois

Government
  - Mayor (2022–2026): Elisabeth Ranson
- Area^{1}: 6.26 km^{2} (2.42 sq mi)
- Elevation: 120 m (390 ft)
- Highest elevation: 114 m (374 ft)
- Lowest elevation: 59 m (194 ft)
- Population (2023): 117
  - Density: 18.7/km^{2} (48.4/sq mi)
- Time zone: UTC+01:00 (CET)
  - Summer (DST): UTC+02:00 (CEST)
- INSEE/Postal code: 60543 /60800
- ^{1} French Land Register data, which excludes lakes, ponds, glaciers > 1 km^{2} (0.386 sq mi or 247 acres) and river estuaries.

Rocquemont (French pronunciation: [ʁɔkmɔ̃]) is a commune in the Oise department in northern France.

== See also ==
- Communes of the Oise department
