= Béthisy-Saint-Martin =

- Commune
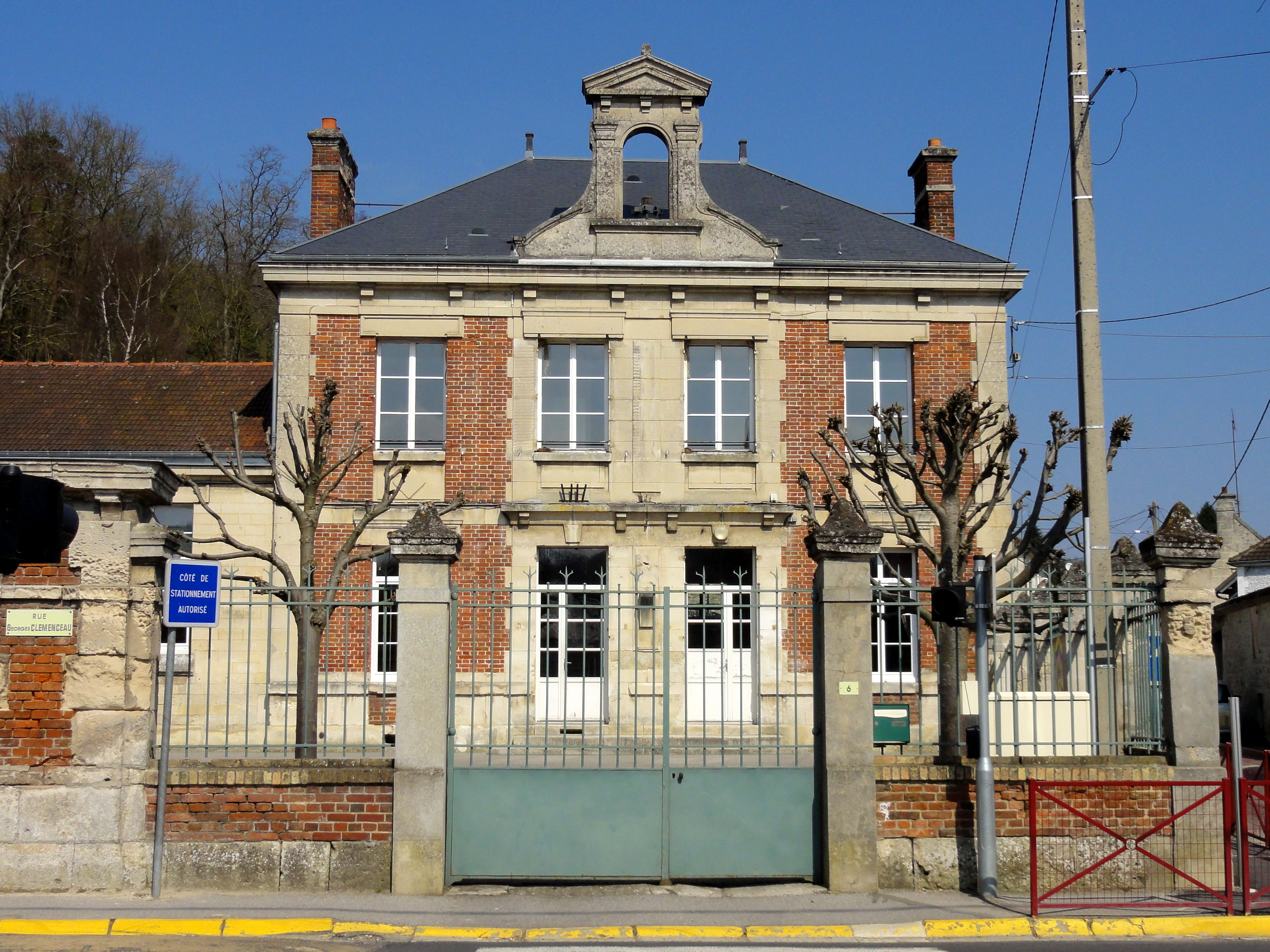
- The town hall in Béthisy-Saint-Martin
- Location of Béthisy-Saint-Martin
- Location within France Location within Hauts-de-France
- Coordinates: 49°17′43″N 2°48′57″E
- Country: France
- Region: Hauts-de-France
- Department: Oise
- Arrondissement: Senlis
- Canton: Crépy-en-Valois
- Intercommunality: CA Région de Compiègne et Basse Automne

Government
  - Mayor (2020–2026): Alain Dricourt
- Area^{1}: 9.82 km^{2} (3.79 sq mi)
- Elevation: 43 m (141 ft)
- Highest elevation: 122 m (400 ft)
- Lowest elevation: 41 m (135 ft)
- Population (2023): 996
  - Density: 101/km^{2} (263/sq mi)
- Time zone: UTC+01:00 (CET)
  - Summer (DST): UTC+02:00 (CEST)
- INSEE/Postal code: 60067 /60320
- ^{1} French Land Register data, which excludes lakes, ponds, glaciers > 1 km^{2} (0.386 sq mi or 247 acres) and river estuaries.

Béthisy-Saint-Martin (French pronunciation: [betizi sɛ̃ maʁtɛ̃]) is a commune in the Oise department in northern France.

== Population ==
Historical population
Year	Pop.	±% p.a.
1968	797	—
1975	828	+0.55%
1982	846	+0.31%
1990	1,023	+2.40%
1999	1,134	+1.15%
2007	1,098	−0.40%
2012	1,110	+0.22%
2017	1,060	−0.92%
2023	996	−1.03%
Source: INSEE

== See also ==
- Communes of the Oise department
