= Canton of Crépy-en-Valois =

Canton of France

Coordinates: 49.23°N 2.89°E

- Canton
- Situation of the canton of Crépy-en-Valois in the department of Oise
- Country: France
- Region: Hauts-de-France
- Department: Oise
- No. of communes: {{{nbcomm}}}
- Population (2023): 34,013
- INSEE code: 6009

The canton of Crépy-en-Valois is an administrative division of the Oise department, northern France. Its borders were modified at the French canton reorganisation which came into effect in March 2015. Its seat is in Crépy-en-Valois.

It consists of the following communes:

1. Auger-Saint-Vincent
2. Béthancourt-en-Valois
3. Béthisy-Saint-Martin
4. Béthisy-Saint-Pierre
5. Bonneuil-en-Valois
6. Crépy-en-Valois
7. Duvy
8. Éméville
9. Feigneux
10. Fresnoy-la-Rivière
11. Gilocourt
12. Glaignes
13. Morienval
14. Néry
15. Orrouy
16. Rocquemont
17. Russy-Bémont
18. Saintines
19. Saint-Vaast-de-Longmont
20. Séry-Magneval
21. Trumilly
22. Vauciennes
23. Vaumoise
24. Verberie
25. Vez
