= Gilocourt =

- Commune
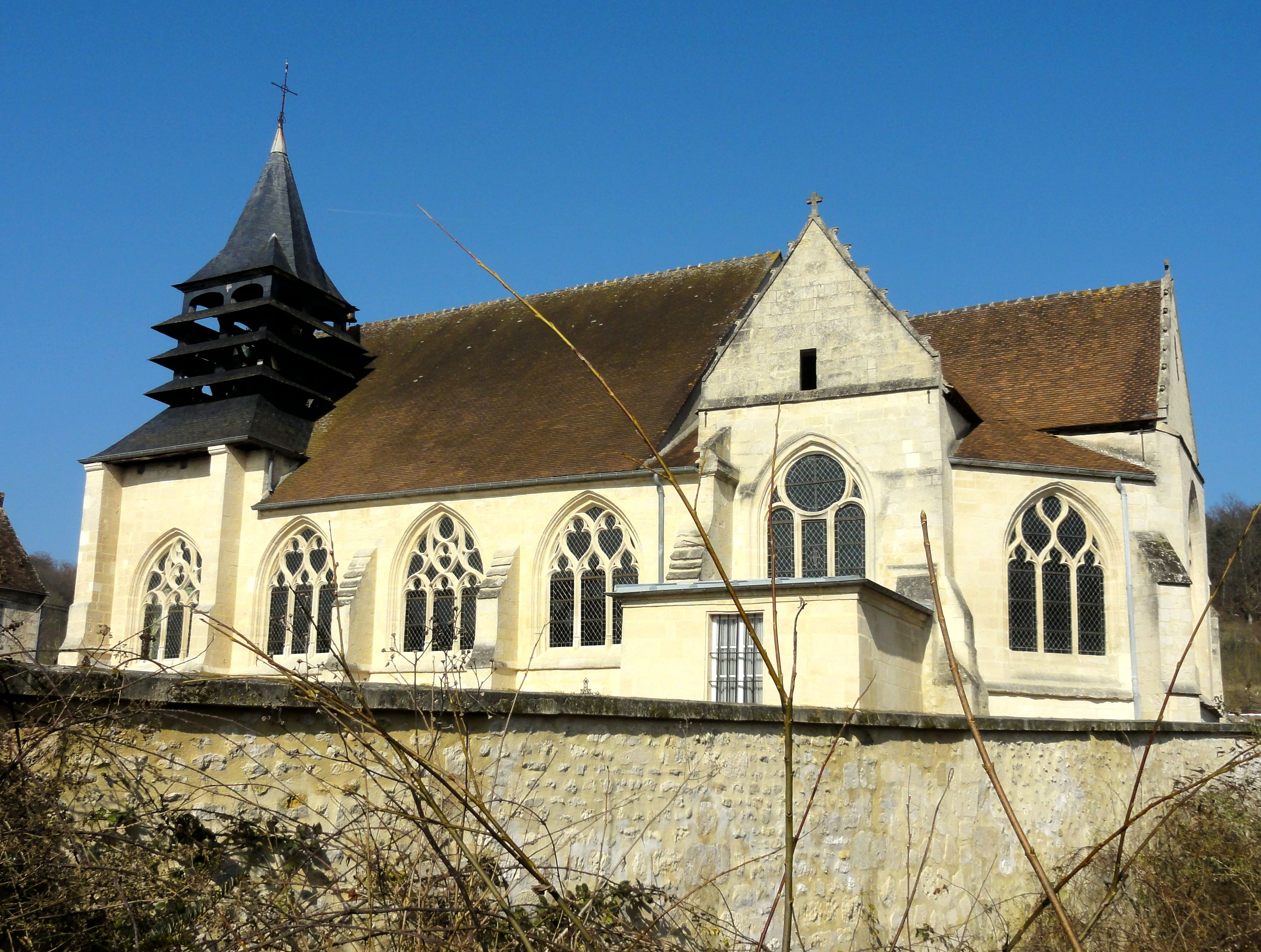
- The church in Gilocourt
- Location of Gilocourt
- Location within France Location within Hauts-de-France
- Coordinates: 49°17′34″N 2°52′49″E
- Country: France
- Region: Hauts-de-France
- Department: Oise
- Arrondissement: Senlis
- Canton: Crépy-en-Valois
- Intercommunality: Pays de Valois

Government
  - Mayor (2020–2026): Michel Cassa
- Area^{1}: 6.93 km^{2} (2.68 sq mi)
- Elevation: 65 m (213 ft)
- Highest elevation: 143 m (469 ft)
- Lowest elevation: 48 m (157 ft)
- Population (2023): 626
  - Density: 90.3/km^{2} (234/sq mi)
- Time zone: UTC+01:00 (CET)
  - Summer (DST): UTC+02:00 (CEST)
- INSEE/Postal code: 60272 /60129
- ^{1} French Land Register data, which excludes lakes, ponds, glaciers > 1 km^{2} (0.386 sq mi or 247 acres) and river estuaries.

Gilocourt (French pronunciation: [ʒilɔkuʁ]) is a commune in the Oise department in northern France.

== See also ==
- Communes of the Oise department
