= Séry-Magneval =

- Commune
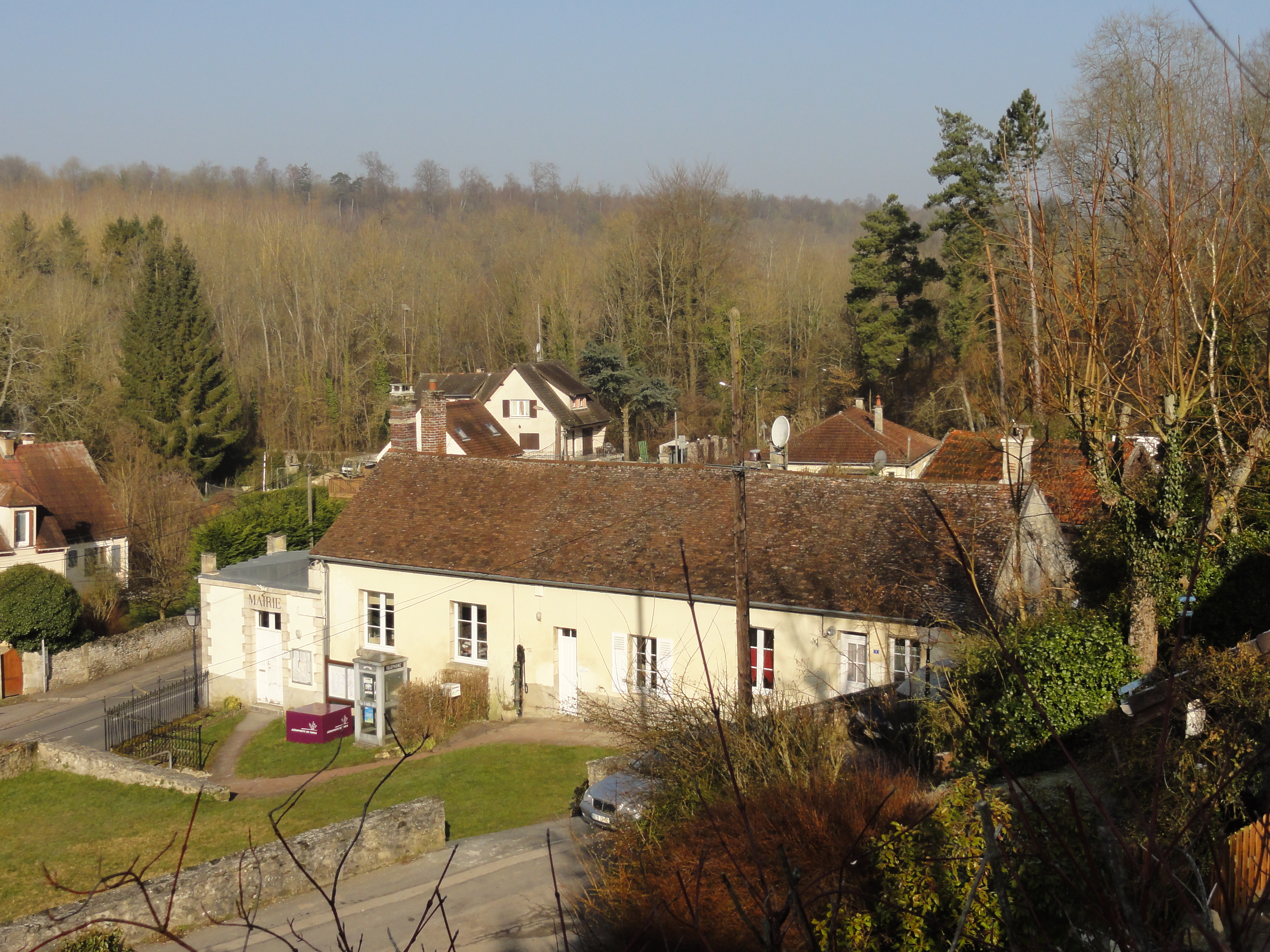
- The town hall in Séry-Magneval
- Location of Séry-Magneval
- Location within France Location within Hauts-de-France
- Coordinates: 49°15′31″N 2°51′21″E
- Country: France
- Region: Hauts-de-France
- Department: Oise
- Arrondissement: Senlis
- Canton: Crépy-en-Valois
- Intercommunality: Pays de Valois

Government
  - Mayor (2020–2026): Bernard Levasseur
- Area^{1}: 6.02 km^{2} (2.32 sq mi)
- Elevation: 71 m (233 ft)
- Highest elevation: 126 m (413 ft)
- Lowest elevation: 52 m (171 ft)
- Population (2023): 269
  - Density: 44.7/km^{2} (116/sq mi)
- Time zone: UTC+01:00 (CET)
  - Summer (DST): UTC+02:00 (CEST)
- INSEE/Postal code: 60618 /60800
- ^{1} French Land Register data, which excludes lakes, ponds, glaciers > 1 km^{2} (0.386 sq mi or 247 acres) and river estuaries.

Séry-Magneval (French pronunciation: [seʁi maɲval]) is a commune in the Oise department in northern France.

== See also ==
- Communes of the Oise department
