= Feigneux =

- Commune
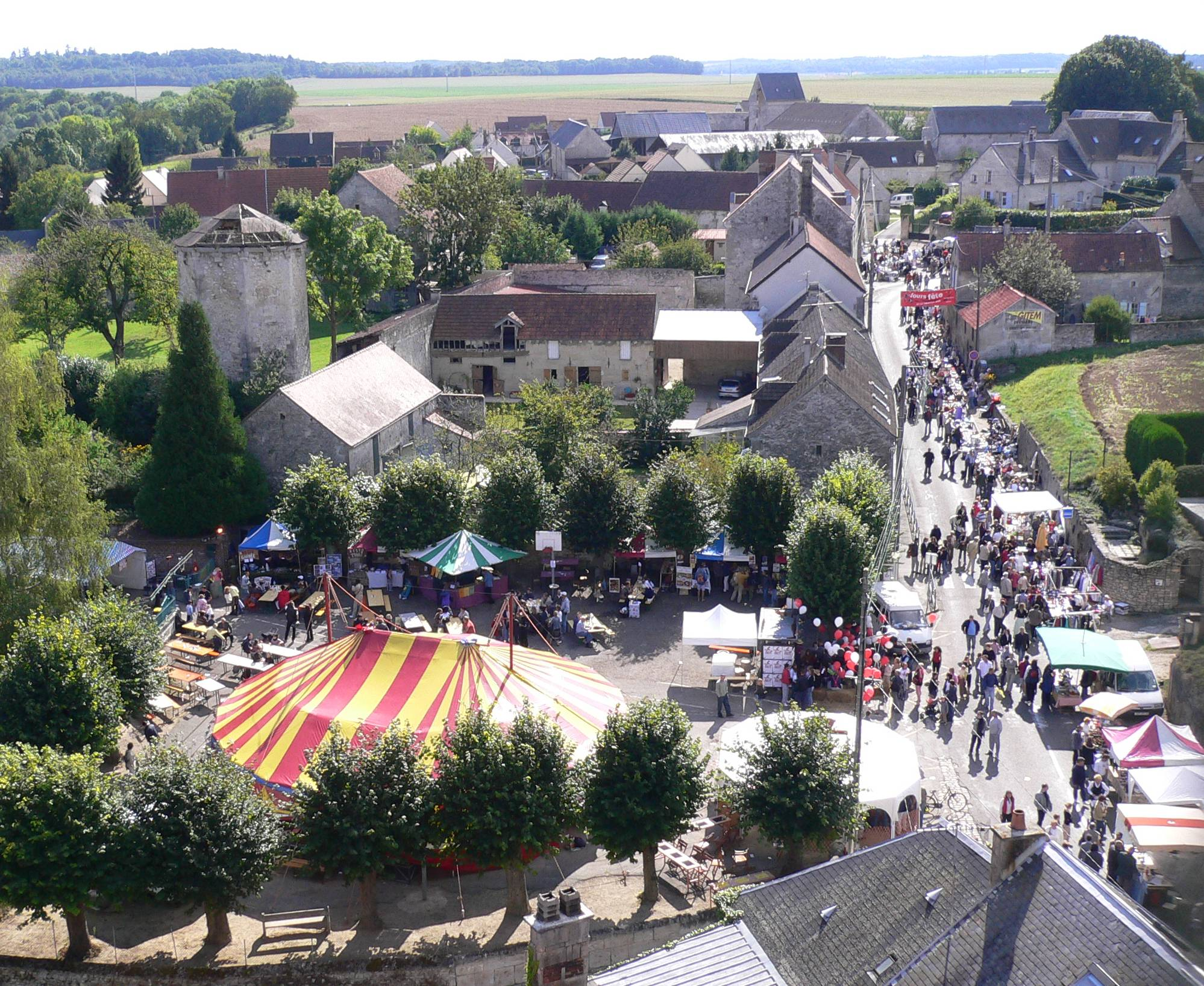
- An aerial view of Feigneux
- Location of Feigneux
- Location within France Location within Hauts-de-France
- Coordinates: 49°15′35″N 2°55′55″E
- Country: France
- Region: Hauts-de-France
- Department: Oise
- Arrondissement: Senlis
- Canton: Crépy-en-Valois
- Intercommunality: Pays de Valois

Government
  - Mayor (2023–2026): Véronique Cavaletti
- Area^{1}: 11.41 km^{2} (4.41 sq mi)
- Elevation: 102 m (335 ft)
- Highest elevation: 136 m (446 ft)
- Lowest elevation: 52 m (171 ft)
- Population (2023): 465
  - Density: 40.8/km^{2} (106/sq mi)
- Time zone: UTC+01:00 (CET)
  - Summer (DST): UTC+02:00 (CEST)
- INSEE/Postal code: 60231 /60800
- ^{1} French Land Register data, which excludes lakes, ponds, glaciers > 1 km^{2} (0.386 sq mi or 247 acres) and river estuaries.

Feigneux (French pronunciation: [fɛɲø]) is a commune in the Oise department in northern France.

== See also ==
- Communes of the Oise department
