= Orrouy =

- Commune
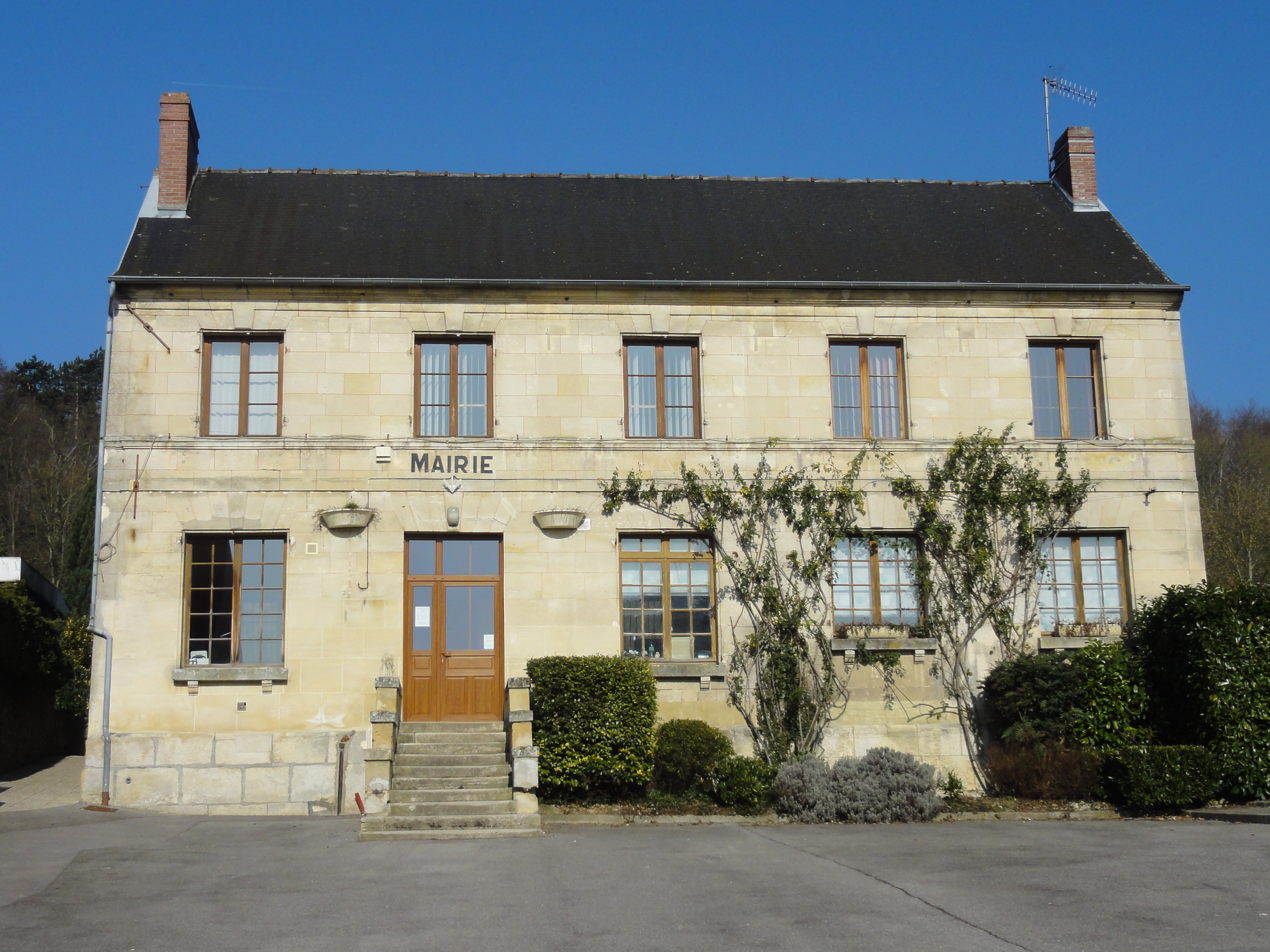
- The town hall in Orrouy
- Location of Orrouy
- Location within France Location within Hauts-de-France
- Coordinates: 49°17′39″N 2°51′39″E
- Country: France
- Region: Hauts-de-France
- Department: Oise
- Arrondissement: Senlis
- Canton: Crépy-en-Valois
- Intercommunality: Pays de Valois

Government
  - Mayor (2020–2026): Daniel Gage
- Area^{1}: 16.14 km^{2} (6.23 sq mi)
- Elevation: 60 m (200 ft)
- Highest elevation: 143 m (469 ft)
- Lowest elevation: 45 m (148 ft)
- Population (2023): 572
  - Density: 35.4/km^{2} (91.8/sq mi)
- Time zone: UTC+01:00 (CET)
  - Summer (DST): UTC+02:00 (CEST)
- INSEE/Postal code: 60481 /60129
- ^{1} French Land Register data, which excludes lakes, ponds, glaciers > 1 km^{2} (0.386 sq mi or 247 acres) and river estuaries.

Orrouy (French pronunciation: [ɔʁwi]) is a commune in the Oise department in northern France.

== See also ==
- Communes of the Oise department
