= Glaignes =

- Commune
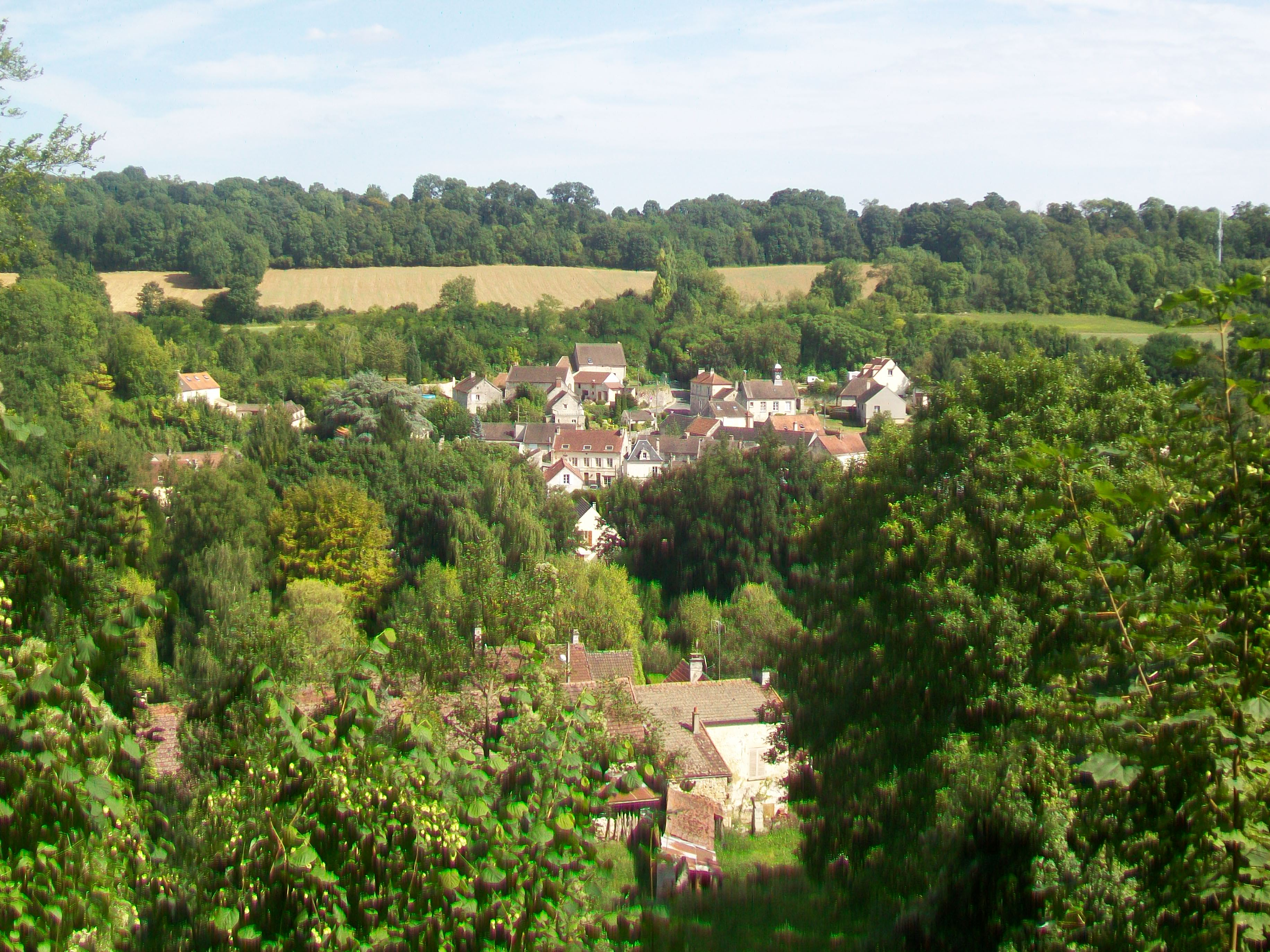
- A general view of Glaignes
- Location of Glaignes
- Location within France Location within Hauts-de-France
- Coordinates: 49°16′23″N 2°51′10″E
- Country: France
- Region: Hauts-de-France
- Department: Oise
- Arrondissement: Senlis
- Canton: Crépy-en-Valois
- Intercommunality: Pays de Valois

Government
  - Mayor (2020–2026): Marie-Paule Tardiveau
- Area^{1}: 5.42 km^{2} (2.09 sq mi)
- Elevation: 100 m (330 ft)
- Highest elevation: 116 m (381 ft)
- Lowest elevation: 46 m (151 ft)
- Population (2023): 356
  - Density: 65.7/km^{2} (170/sq mi)
- Time zone: UTC+01:00 (CET)
  - Summer (DST): UTC+02:00 (CEST)
- INSEE/Postal code: 60274 /60129
- ^{1} French Land Register data, which excludes lakes, ponds, glaciers > 1 km^{2} (0.386 sq mi or 247 acres) and river estuaries.

Glaignes (French pronunciation: [ɡlɛɲ]) is a commune in the Oise department in northern France.

== See also ==
- Communes of the Oise department
