= Béthancourt-en-Valois =

- Commune
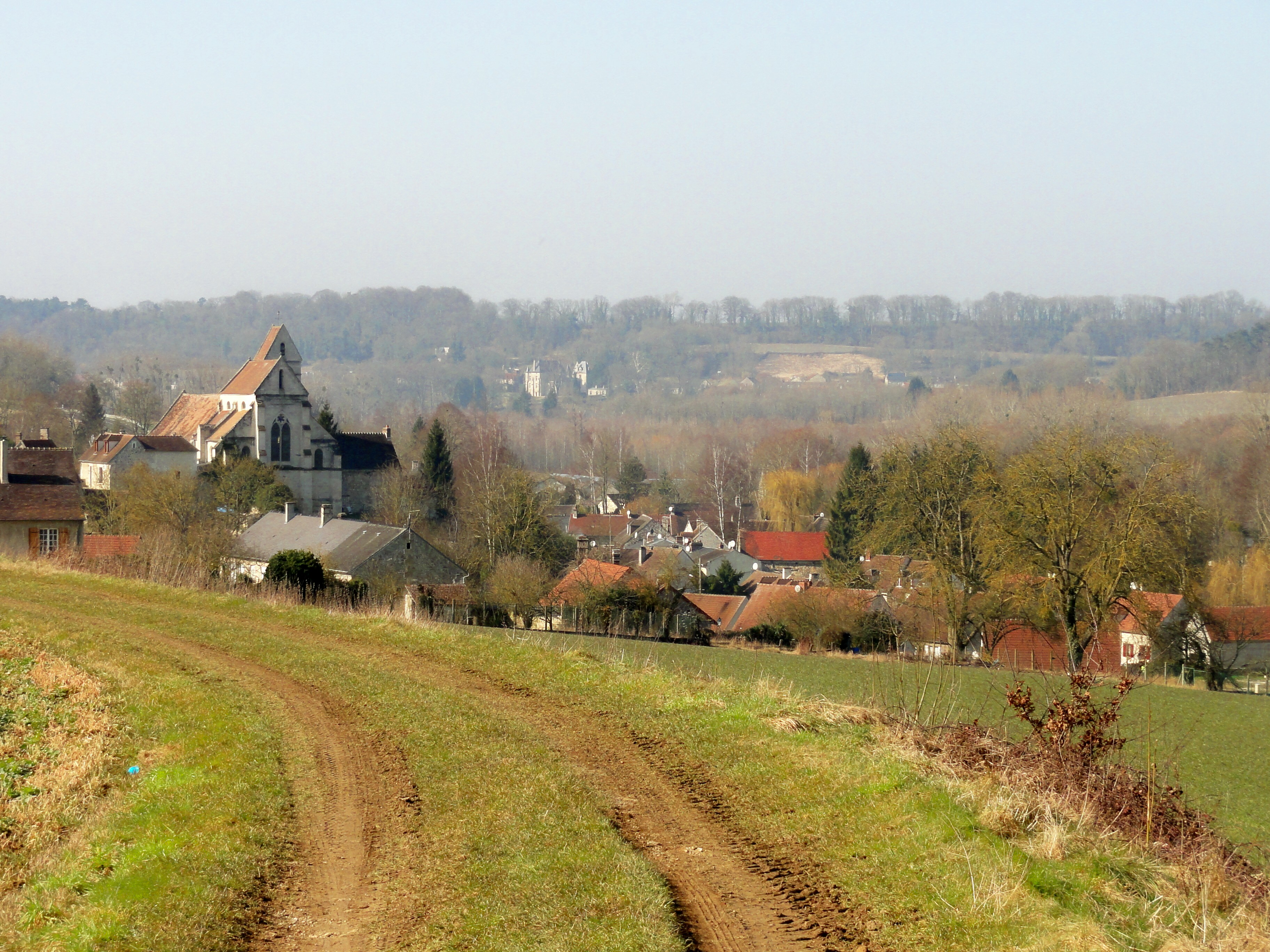
- A general view of Béthancourt-en-Valois

- Coat of arms
- Location of Béthancourt-en-Valois
- Location within France Location within Hauts-de-France
- Coordinates: 49°17′06″N 2°52′40″E
- Country: France
- Region: Hauts-de-France
- Department: Oise
- Arrondissement: Senlis
- Canton: Crépy-en-Valois
- Intercommunality: Pays de Valois

Government
  - Mayor (2020–2026): Dominique Danneel
- Area^{1}: 4.12 km^{2} (1.59 sq mi)
- Highest elevation: 129 m (423 ft)
- Lowest elevation: 48 m (157 ft)
- Population (2023): 214
  - Density: 51.9/km^{2} (135/sq mi)
- Time zone: UTC+01:00 (CET)
  - Summer (DST): UTC+02:00 (CEST)
- INSEE/Postal code: 60066 /60129
- ^{1} French Land Register data, which excludes lakes, ponds, glaciers > 1 km^{2} (0.386 sq mi or 247 acres) and river estuaries.

Béthancourt-en-Valois (French pronunciation: [betɑ̃kuʁ ɑ̃ valwa], lit. 'Béthancourt in Valois') is a commune in the Oise department in northern France.

== Population ==
Historical population
Year	Pop.	±% p.a.
1968	179	—
1975	194	+1.16%
1982	213	+1.34%
1990	228	+0.85%
1999	249	+0.98%
2007	251	+0.10%
2012	243	−0.65%
2017	218	−2.15%
2023	214	−0.31%
Source: INSEE

== See also ==
- Communes of the Oise department
