= Fresnoy-la-Rivière =

- Commune
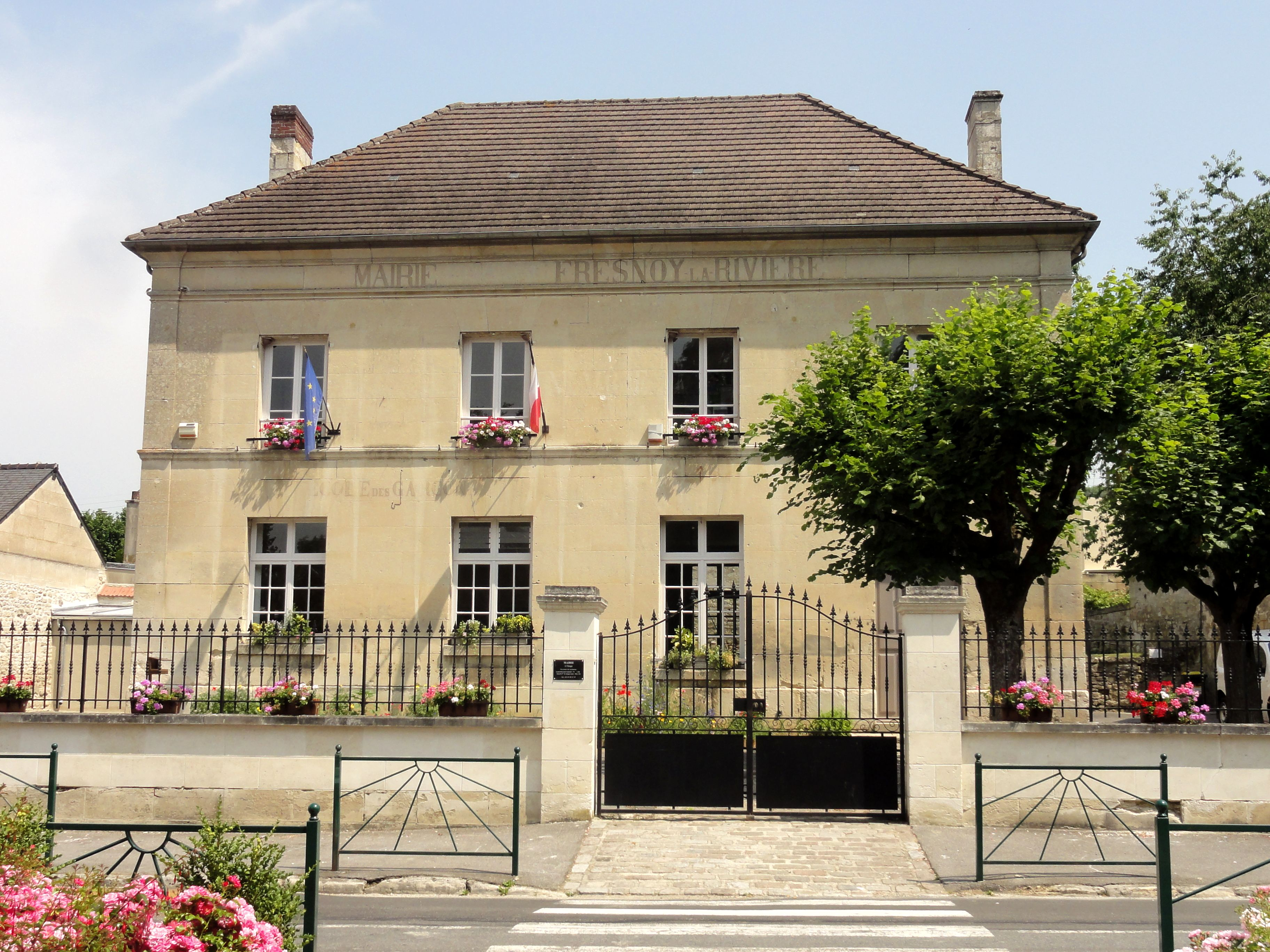
- The town hall in Fresnoy-la-Rivière
- Location of Fresnoy-la-Rivière
- Location within France Location within Hauts-de-France
- Coordinates: 49°17′06″N 2°55′01″E
- Country: France
- Region: Hauts-de-France
- Department: Oise
- Arrondissement: Senlis
- Canton: Crépy-en-Valois
- Intercommunality: Pays de Valois

Government
  - Mayor (2020–2026): Christian Bornigal
- Area^{1}: 6.81 km^{2} (2.63 sq mi)
- Elevation: 60 m (200 ft)
- Highest elevation: 138 m (453 ft)
- Lowest elevation: 52 m (171 ft)
- Population (2023): 670
  - Density: 98/km^{2} (250/sq mi)
- Time zone: UTC+01:00 (CET)
  - Summer (DST): UTC+02:00 (CEST)
- INSEE/Postal code: 60260 /60127
- ^{1} French Land Register data, which excludes lakes, ponds, glaciers > 1 km^{2} (0.386 sq mi or 247 acres) and river estuaries.

Fresnoy-la-Rivière (French pronunciation: [fʁɛnwa la ʁivjɛʁ]) is a commune in the Oise department in northern France.

== See also ==
- Communes of the Oise department
