= Russy-Bémont =

- Commune
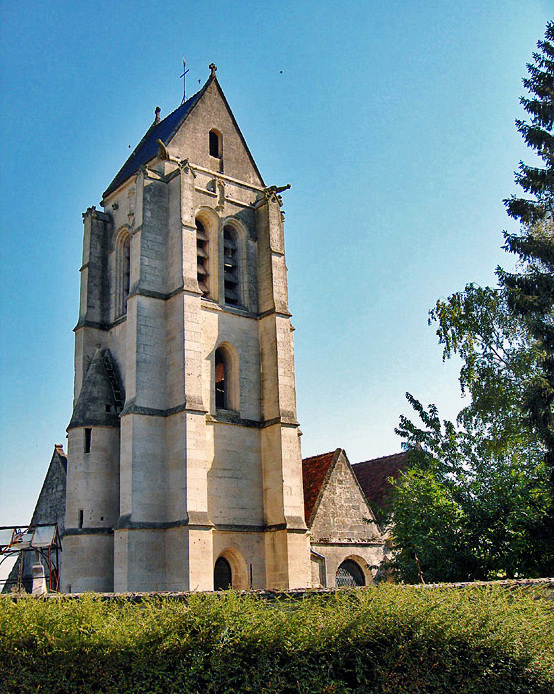
- The church in Russy-Bémont
- Location of Russy-Bémont
- Location within France Location within Hauts-de-France
- Coordinates: 49°14′38″N 2°57′57″E
- Country: France
- Region: Hauts-de-France
- Department: Oise
- Arrondissement: Senlis
- Canton: Crépy-en-Valois
- Intercommunality: Pays de Valois

Government
  - Mayor (2020–2026): François Philipon
- Area^{1}: 9.75 km^{2} (3.76 sq mi)
- Elevation: 113 m (371 ft)
- Highest elevation: 153 m (502 ft)
- Lowest elevation: 58 m (190 ft)
- Population (2023): 247
  - Density: 25.3/km^{2} (65.6/sq mi)
- Time zone: UTC+01:00 (CET)
  - Summer (DST): UTC+02:00 (CEST)
- INSEE/Postal code: 60561 /60117
- ^{1} French Land Register data, which excludes lakes, ponds, glaciers > 1 km^{2} (0.386 sq mi or 247 acres) and river estuaries.

Russy-Bémont (French pronunciation: [ʁysi bemɔ̃]) is a commune in the Oise department in northern France.

== See also ==
- Communes of the Oise department
