= Domaine du Lys-Chantilly =

Domaine du Lys-Chantilly Le Lys, Chantilly du Lys
- estate
- Location within France
- Coordinates: 49°10′00″N 2°23′12″E
- Country: France
- Ferté de la Villeneuve de Lamorlaye: 12th century
- Founder: Philippe Hurepel, count of Dammartin
- Named for: Girard and Guillaume de Lis

Area
  - Total: 760 ha (1,900 acres)

The Domaine du Lys-Chantilly is a private residential estate on a wooded site adjacent to Chantilly Forest in France, overlapping the border between the communes of Gouvieux and Lamorlaye in the département of the Oise.

== Overview ==
Situated in the south of the Oise on the edge of Chantilly Forest, Lys-Chantilly is 36 km from Paris. The Domaine straddles the communes de Lamorlaye (90% of its surface) and of Gouvieux.

The Domaine du Lys-Chantilly has 1500 landowners in 760 hectares and has 45 km of roads. They belong to an association syndicale autorisée, the Association Syndicale des propriétaires du Lys-Chantilly.

== History ==
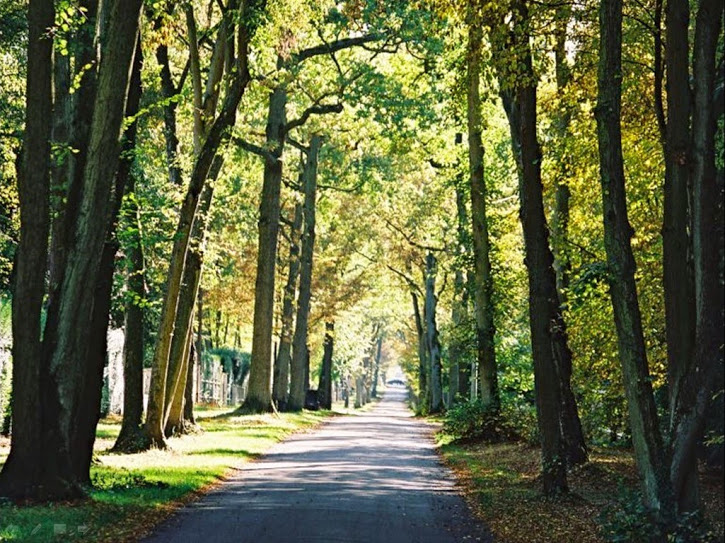
Domaine du Lys-Chantilly, Grande Avenue

The history of Lys-Chantilly is intimately tied to those of the municipalities of Lamorlaye and Gouvieux, as well as to the Abbey of Royaumont.

It probably originated in the founding of the Ferté de la Villeneuve de Lamorlaye at the end of the 12th century and is thought to have been the seat of a seigniory in the first third of the 13th century, owned by Philippe Hurepel, count of Dammartin. Gouvieux is an old estate of the Carolingians, then Capetian then Norman.

In 1196, Philippe-Auguste traded assets in Île-de-France (including Gouvieux) for the Norman estate of Vernon. A Norman knight, Richard de Vernon, became lord of Gouvieux. The Condé library has in its collection a 1219 charter outlining the property lines along the Nonette River between Gui Le Bouteiller, seigneur de Chantilly, and Richard de Vernon, seigneur de Gouvieux, from the chapel of Saint-Germain in Quinquempoix as far as Avilly-Saint-Léonard.

In the 12th century, the fief belonged to knights known as "de Lis" (of the lily, possibly a reference to the fleur-de-lys). They were the vassals of Count Mathieu de Beaumont: Girard and Guillaume de Lis.

Around 1350, the Lys estate belonged to Messire Jacques de Belloy, following an alliance between Robert du Lis and Blanche de Belloy. It became the property of the de Belloy family, from the 14th to the end of the 16th century. Jeanne de Belloy brought it as a dowry to her marriage in 1506 to François le Maire de Boullan. In November 1599, Lady Jeanne de Belloy and François Le Maire de Boullan ceded these lands to their son-in-law, Charles de Marc, horseman, lord of Montcrépin, married to their daughter Françoise and living in the du Lys manor.

Around 1600, the village was composed of a manor for the seigneur, a church and graveyard, about twenty houses, and to the west, belonging to Royaumont Abbey, a large farm known as the ferme de Royaumont.

Charles de Marcq died 7 January 1632, and his widow, Françoise le Maire de Boullan, died 22 January 1638. They were buried in the Saint-Vaast church church. The seigneurie of the Lys fell to their third son, Henri de Marcq, married to the damoiselle Louise de Boullan.

Around 1650, Henri de Marcq died. The seigneurie du Lys fell to Louise and Jeanne de Boullan. At her death on 7 May 1659, Jeanne de Boullan ceded the du Lys lands to Louise de Boullan, who married (as a second marriage) Henry de Belloy. Louise de Boullan does not seem to have had any children from this second marriage, for at her death, Le Lys became the property of another family member, René Le Maire de Boullan, lord of Parisis-Fontaines, Bercourt and Longueil. He died shortly afterwards, leaving three children, Antoine, Benoît and Geneviève. Antoine Le Maire de Boulan had reached the age of majority and took up the lordship of the Lys. On 30 September 1688, Antoine Le Maire de Boullan sold the land and seigneurie of the Lys to Henri-Jules de Bourbon, Prince of Condé, lord of Chantilly from 1686 to 1709, son of the Grand Condé, Louis II de Bourbon, rumored to suffer from lycanthropy.

In 1830, on the death of Louis VI Henri Joseph de Bourbon, the Duke of Aumale, Henri d’Orléans, inherited an immense fortune, including the Château de Chantilly and its forest, with an estimated total value of 66 million gold francs. In 1886, the Duke of Aumale bequeathed the nue-propriété of the Domaine de Chantilly but kept its usufruct for himself. This made the Domain of Chantilly and its collections the property of the Institut de France on his death in 1897, on condition that Condé museum become a public museum, with its layout unchanged and its collections in place and never loaned. On February 12, 1894, he sold the Lys forest for 1 million francs to Baron Henri de Rothschild. On July 5, 1919, Cerf Adolphe Bernard bought it. On February 7, 1924, the lands were sold to the Société Anonyme Immobilière du Lys-Chantilly, whose president and director was a Monsieur Manin.

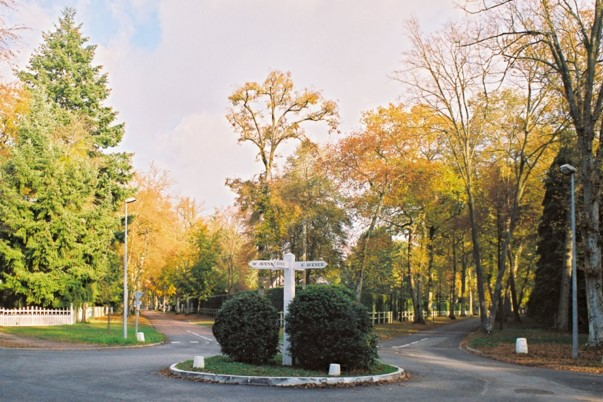

The 10 February 1925, the prefect of the Oise authorized the subdivision of the Lys forest and the creation of a municipality of parks. In June 1937, the Association Syndicale Libre du Lys-Chantilly was formed. In April 1947 the Association Syndicale des propriétaires du Lys-Chantilly, with new statutes making it an association syndicale autorisée.

== Notable residents ==
- Bernard Cazeneuve.
- Xavier Niel.
