= N16 =

N16 or N-16 may refer to:

== Roads ==
- N16 road (Belgium), a National Road in Belgium
- Route nationale 16, in France
- N16 road (Ireland)
- Nebraska Highway 16, in the United States

== Vehicles ==
- HMS N16, a German submarine surrendered to the Royal Navy after the Second World War
- HMS Rainbow (N16), a submarine of the Royal Navy
- Nieuport 16, a French First World War fighter aircraft
- Nissan Almera (N16), a Japanese automobile sold in Europe
- Nissan Bluebird Sylphy (N16), a Japanese automobile sold in Asia

== Other uses ==
- N16 (Long Island bus)
- BMW N16, an automobile engine
- Centre Airpark, an airport in Centre Hall, Pennsylvania, United States
- London Buses route N16
- Nagahoribashi Station, of the Osaka Metro
- Nitrogen-16, am isotope of nitrogen
- N16, a postcode district in the N postcode area
