= Route nationale 16 =

Road in France

The Route nationale 16, or RN16, is a trunk road (nationale) in France crossing Picardy north of Paris.

== Reclassification ==
The majority of the road has now been re-classified as the RD 1016 and RD 916.

== Route ==
=== Pierrefitte-sur-Seine to Clermont (0km - 66km) ===
The road starts in Pierrefitte-sur-Seine, north of Paris as a branch of the RN 1, as the Avenue de la Division Leclerc and bypasses the town of Sarcelles and heads into open countryside crossing the RN 104 (La Francilienne). The road passes the castle and estate of Épinay-Champlâtreux and the Parc naturel régional Oise-Pays de France. The road bypasses Luzarches and plunges through the Forêt de Coye and then on to Chantilly.

At Chantilly the road crosses the river of Nonette and on through woodland to Creil in the Oise valley. The road crosses the valley up the Brèche valley to Clermont, The road has a junction here with the RN 31 from Beauvais to Compiègne.

=== Clermont to Amiens (66km to 132km) ===
The road has now been downgraded to the RD 916 north of Clermont. The road initially follows the Arné valley north. At Saint-Just-en-Chaussée it follows the course of an old Roman road. The road leaves the valley and heads through open country to the town of Breteuil where it meets the RN 1 (former RN 181). The RN 16 has been renamed RN 1 (now RD 1001) until the town of Amiens.

=== Amiens to Dunkerque (132km to 287km) ===
North of Amiens, the RN 16 has been renamed RN 25 until the town of Doullens. The road continues north numbered as RD 916. The road passes the market town of Frévent and the river Canche. The road crosses the former RN 39 (now RD 939) south of the town of Saint-Pol-sur-Ternoise. The road has been renamed as RN 41 (that has since been downgraded as RD 941) before becoming the RD 916 once more. The road continues north to the town of Lillers and a junction with the A26 autoroute (Junction 5). The town had a junction with the N43 (now RD 943) from Calais to Douai.

The road crosses the River Lys and then Forêt de Nieppe. The road then passes through the town of Hazebrouck where it meets the RN 42. 4 km to the north the road turns north west. The road passes the town of Cassel and the Mont des Récollets (159m). The road passes Wormhout, crosses the A25 autoroute where the road meets with the RN 28 (now RD 928). It then enters the town of Dunkerque.
