= Chantilly Jumping =

Show jumping event in France

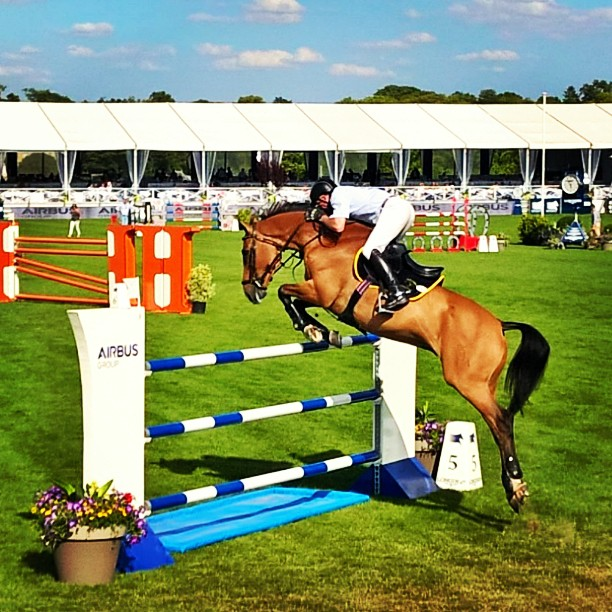
John Whitaker (equestrian) at Chantilly Jumping in 2015

Chantilly Jumping is an international show jumping event and one of the legs of the Global Champions Tour since 2010. It takes place in Chantilly, France, and is one of the three French legs of the tour.

== The Event ==
The event was created in 2001 and has been held every year since, in 2010 it was chosen as one of the legs of the Global Champions Tour. It is held over 3 or 4 days and includes more than 20 different competitions ranging from CSI 1* amateur competitions with obstacle heights of 115 cm through to CSI 5* competitions with an average obstacle height of 160 cm and up to €300,000 prize money.

As part of the Global Champions Tour riders including Kent Farrington, Simon Delestre, Scott Brash, Kevin Staut, Roger-Yves Bost and John Whitaker, compete. It also attracts high-profile competitors such as Athina Onassis, Jessica Springsteen, the actor and director Guillaume Canet, Georgina Bloomberg and Charlotte Casiraghi. The event is broadcast by Eurosport and Equidia a French equestrian television channel.

== Venue ==
The event is held in the centre of the Chantilly racecourse and consists of 2 arenas, the Meautry Arena (15,000 m^{2}) with its 4,000 capacity grandstand and the Amphitheatre (9,200 m^{2}). The Meautry Arena is situated opposite the Great Stables which is home to the Living Museum of the Horse and the Amphitheatre is situated in front of the Château de Chantilly. Both are hybrid grass covered arenas.
