= Aiglemont estate =

Estate owned by the Āgā Khān IV

The Aiglemont estate is an estate at Gouvieux in the Hauts-de-France region of France. It functioned as the secretariat and residence of Aga Khan IV.

It is the headquarters of the Aga Khan Development Network, one of the largest international development networks in the world.
