= Vineuil-Saint-Firmin =

- Commune
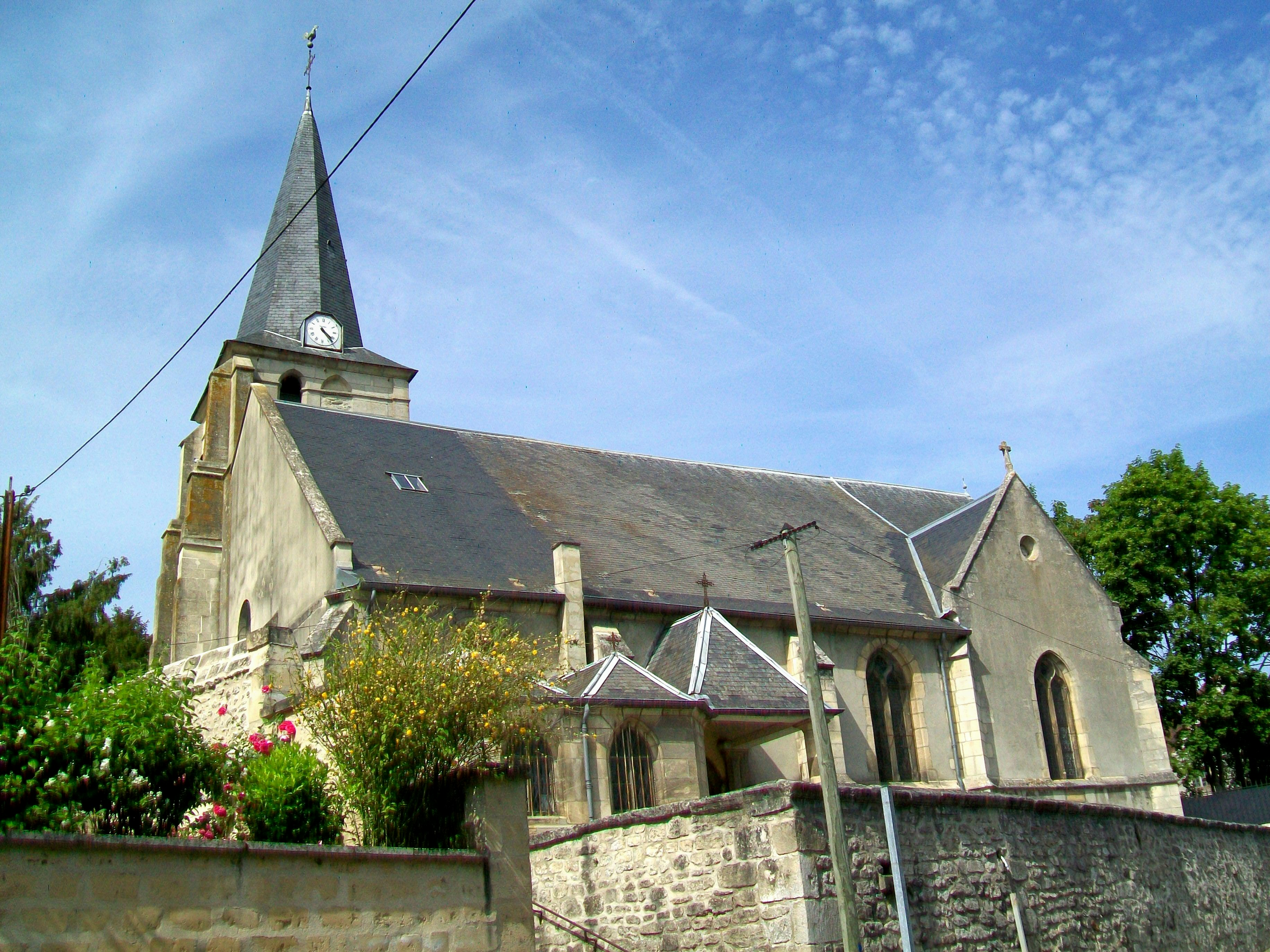
- The church in Vineuil-Saint-Firmin
- Location of Vineuil-Saint-Firmin
- Location within France Location within Hauts-de-France
- Coordinates: 49°12′01″N 2°29′35″E
- Country: France
- Region: Hauts-de-France
- Department: Oise
- Arrondissement: Senlis
- Canton: Senlis
- Intercommunality: Aire cantilienne

Government
  - Mayor (2020–2026): François Lanceraux
- Area^{1}: 7.78 km^{2} (3.00 sq mi)
- Elevation: 50 m (160 ft)
- Highest elevation: 64 m (210 ft)
- Lowest elevation: 37 m (121 ft)
- Population (2023): 1,380
  - Density: 177/km^{2} (459/sq mi)
- Demonym: vinoliens
- Time zone: UTC+01:00 (CET)
  - Summer (DST): UTC+02:00 (CEST)
- INSEE/Postal code: 60695 /60500
- ^{1} French Land Register data, which excludes lakes, ponds, glaciers > 1 km^{2} (0.386 sq mi or 247 acres) and river estuaries.

Vineuil-Saint-Firmin (French pronunciation: [vinœj sɛ̃ fiʁmɛ̃]) is a commune in the Oise department in northern France.

== Population ==
Historical population
Year	Pop.	±% p.a.
1968	1,488	—
1975	1,541	+0.50%
1982	1,333	−2.05%
1990	1,441	+0.98%
1999	1,464	+0.18%
2007	1,517	+0.45%
2012	1,411	−1.44%
2017	1,413	+0.03%
2023	1,380	−0.39%
Source: INSEE

== See also ==
- Communes of the Oise department
