= Coye-la-Forêt =

- Commune
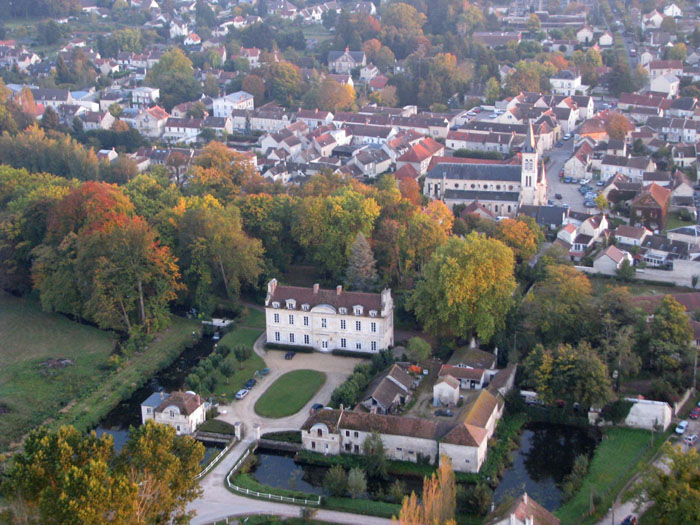
- An aerial view of the château and town centre

- Coat of arms
- Location of Coye-la-Forêt
- Location within France Location within Hauts-de-France
- Coordinates: 49°08′34″N 2°28′27″E
- Country: France
- Region: Hauts-de-France
- Department: Oise
- Arrondissement: Senlis
- Canton: Chantilly
- Intercommunality: CC de l'Aire Cantilienne

Government
  - Mayor (2020–2026): François Deshayes
- Area^{1}: 6.96 km^{2} (2.69 sq mi)
- Highest elevation: 126 m (413 ft)
- Lowest elevation: 31 m (102 ft)
- Population (2023): 3,915
  - Density: 563/km^{2} (1,460/sq mi)
- Demonym: Coyens
- Time zone: UTC+01:00 (CET)
  - Summer (DST): UTC+02:00 (CEST)
- INSEE/Postal code: 60172 /60580
- Website: coyelaforet.com
- ^{1} French Land Register data, which excludes lakes, ponds, glaciers > 1 km^{2} (0.386 sq mi or 247 acres) and river estuaries.

Coye-la-Forêt (French pronunciation: [kwa la fɔʁɛ]; lit. 'Coye-the-Forest') is a commune in the Oise department in the Hauts-de-France region in northern France. It is on the departmental border with Val-d'Oise, which is also the regional border with Île-de-France.

== Population ==
Historical population
Year	Pop.	±% p.a.
1968	2,509	—
1975	3,048	+2.82%
1982	3,094	+0.21%
1990	3,199	+0.42%
1999	3,516	+1.06%
2007	3,757	+0.83%
2012	3,780	+0.12%
2017	3,931	+0.79%
2023	3,915	−0.07%
Source: INSEE

== Gallery ==
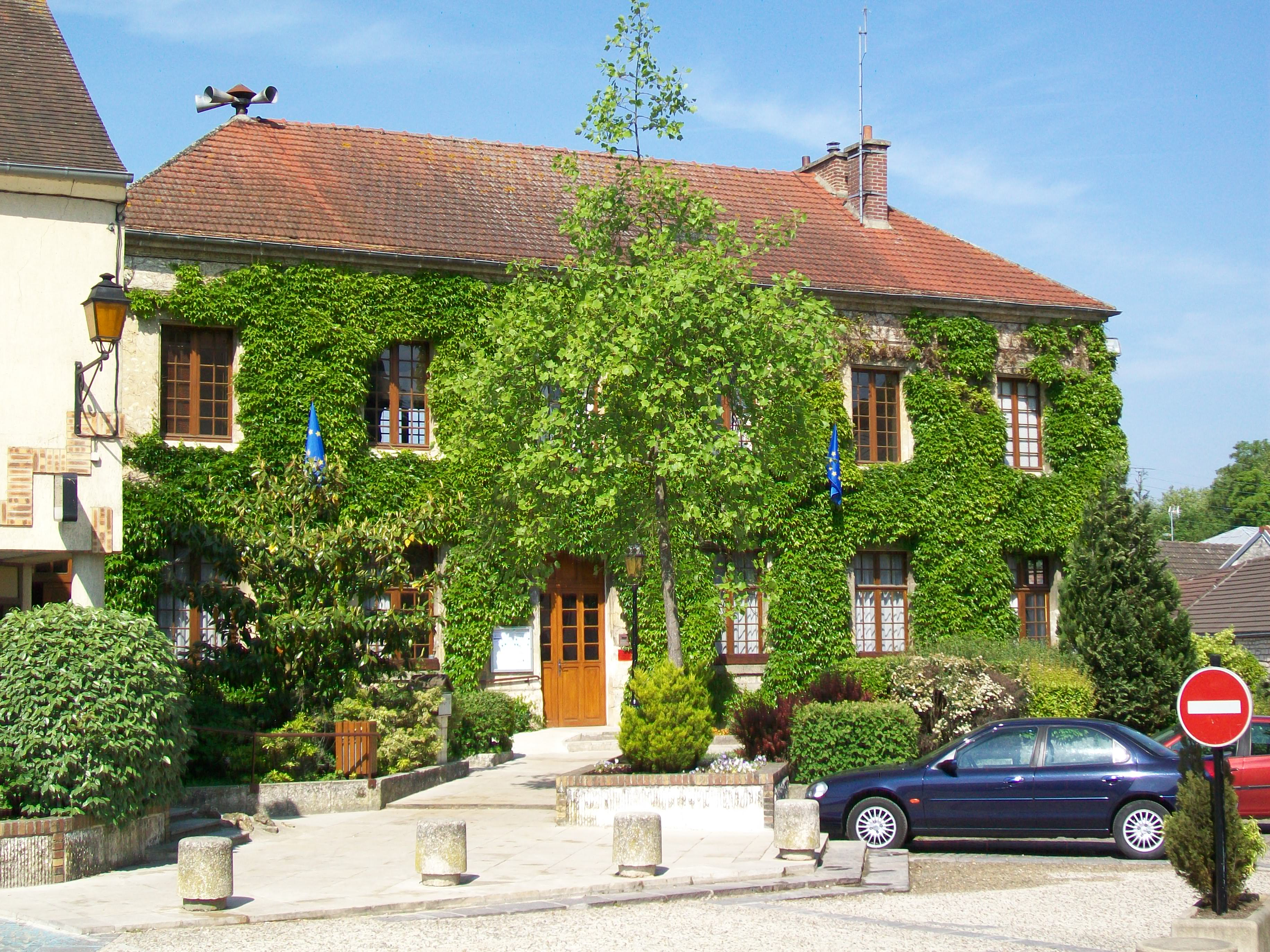
Town hall

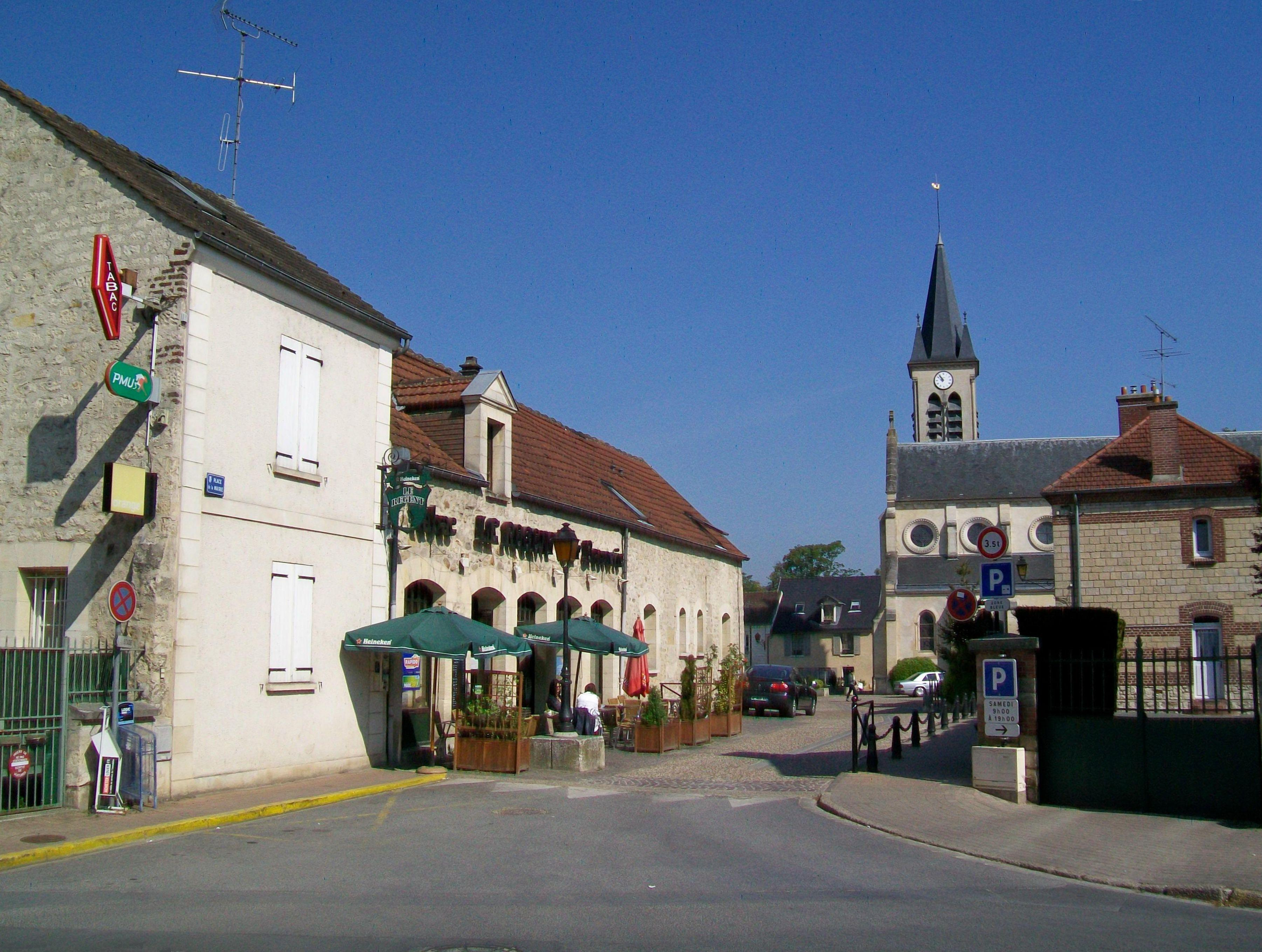
Église Notre-Dame-de-la-Jeunesse

== See also ==
- Communes of the Oise department
