= Gouvieux =

- Commune
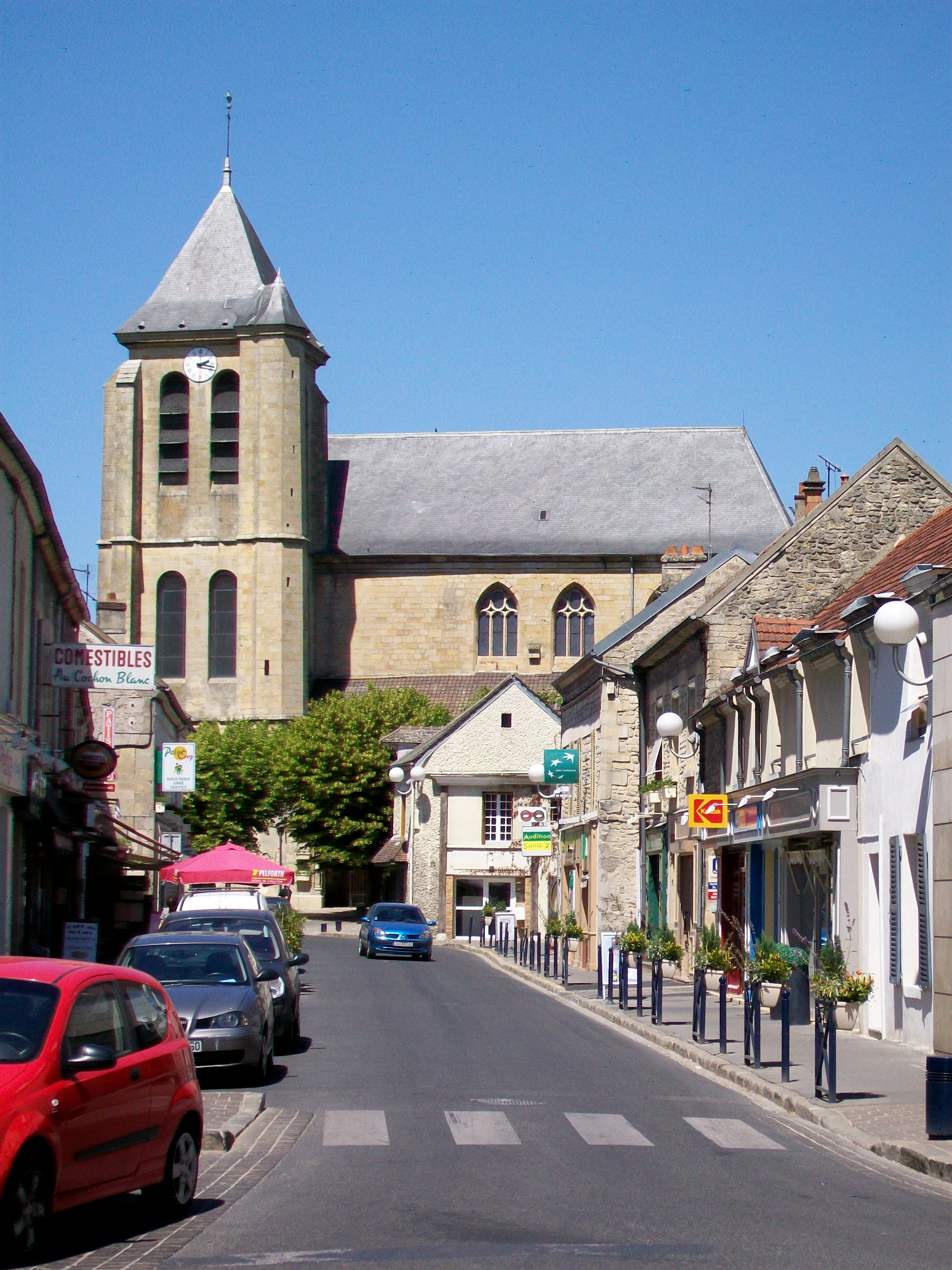
- The church in Gouvieux

- Coat of arms
- Location of Gouvieux
- Location within France Location within Hauts-de-France
- Coordinates: 49°11′18″N 2°25′01″E
- Country: France
- Region: Hauts-de-France
- Department: Oise
- Arrondissement: Senlis
- Canton: Chantilly
- Intercommunality: Aire cantilienne

Government
  - Mayor (2023–2026): Thomas Iraçabal
- Area^{1}: 23.25 km^{2} (8.98 sq mi)
- Elevation: 216 m (709 ft)
- Highest elevation: 103 m (338 ft)
- Lowest elevation: 22 m (72 ft)
- Population (2023): 8,867
  - Density: 381.4/km^{2} (987.8/sq mi)
- Time zone: UTC+01:00 (CET)
  - Summer (DST): UTC+02:00 (CEST)
- INSEE/Postal code: 60282 /60270
- ^{1} French Land Register data, which excludes lakes, ponds, glaciers > 1 km^{2} (0.386 sq mi or 247 acres) and river estuaries.

Gouvieux (French pronunciation: [ɡuvjø]) is a commune in the Oise department in northern France.

== Geography ==
The commune is served by the Chantilly-Gouvieux station on the RER D line or the TER trains from the Parisian Gare du Nord station. The town is located in the urban area of Chantilly.

== Population ==
Historical population
| Year | Pop. | ±% p.a. |
|---|---|---|
| 1968 | 4,751 | — |
| 1975 | 7,088 | +5.88% |
| 1982 | 9,174 | +3.75% |
| 1990 | 9,756 | +0.77% |
| 1999 | 9,406 | −0.41% |
| 2007 | 9,622 | +0.28% |
| 2012 | 9,166 | −0.97% |
| 2017 | 9,069 | −0.21% |
| 2023 | 8,867 | −0.37% |
Source: INSEE

== Notable people ==
- Aga Khan IV lived in Aiglemont estate in Gouvieux.
- Thomas H. Rees, US Army brigadier general, lived in Gouvieux during retirement

== International relations ==
Gouvieux is twinned with:

- Nümbrecht, Germany
- (United Kingdom) Dorking, UK

== See also ==
- Communes of the Oise department
