= Chantilly Forest =

Forest in France

Coordinates: 49.175°N 2.5125°E

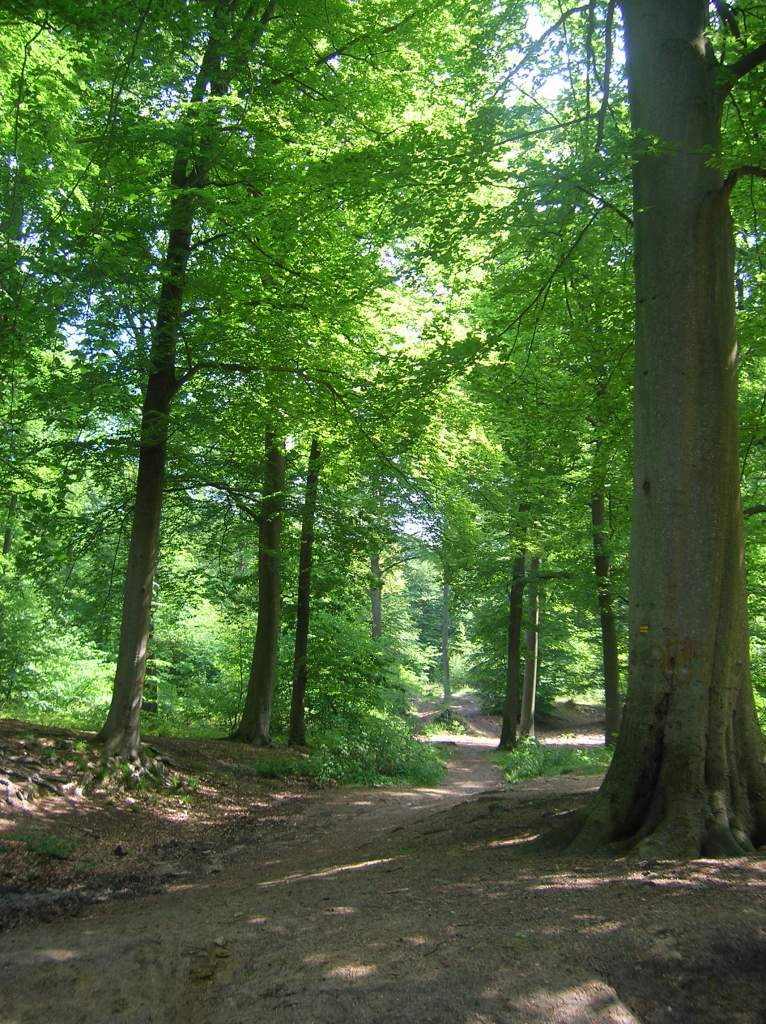
The southern section of Chantilly Forest (Coye Forest)

Chantilly Forest or Forest of Chantilly (Forêt de Chantilly) is a forest that spreads across 6,344 hectares (63.44 km^{2}; 24.49 sq mi), located mainly in the Oise, 35 kilometres (22 mi) north of Paris.
