= Avilly-Saint-Léonard =

- Commune
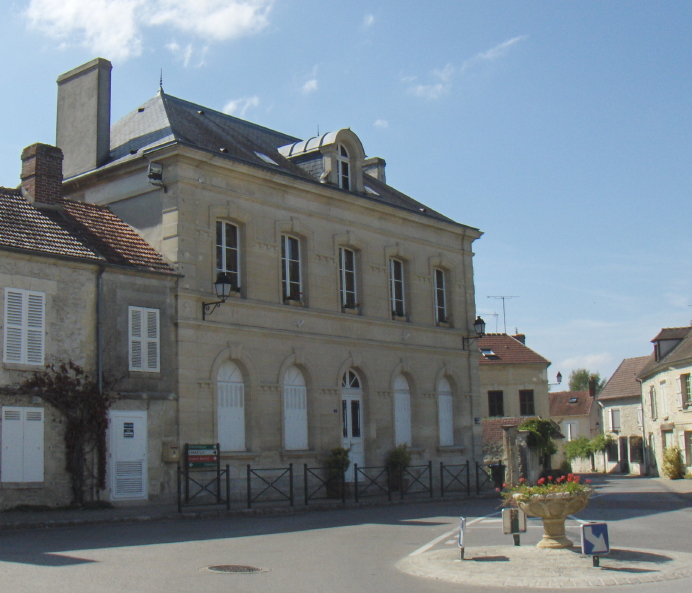
- Town hall
- Location of Avilly-Saint-Léonard
- Location within France Location within Hauts-de-France
- Coordinates: 49°11′41″N 2°32′14″E
- Country: France
- Region: Hauts-de-France
- Department: Oise
- Arrondissement: Senlis
- Canton: Senlis
- Intercommunality: CC Aire Cantilienne

Government
  - Mayor (2020–2026): Anne Lefebvre
- Area^{1}: 11.96 km^{2} (4.62 sq mi)
- Elevation: 50 m (160 ft)
- Highest elevation: 63 m (207 ft)
- Lowest elevation: 40 m (130 ft)
- Population (2023): 852
  - Density: 71.2/km^{2} (185/sq mi)
- Time zone: UTC+01:00 (CET)
  - Summer (DST): UTC+02:00 (CEST)
- INSEE/Postal code: 60033 /60300
- ^{1} French Land Register data, which excludes lakes, ponds, glaciers > 1 km^{2} (0.386 sq mi or 247 acres) and river estuaries.

Avilly-Saint-Léonard is a commune in the Oise department in northern France.

== Population ==
Historical population
Year	Pop.	±% p.a.
1968	769	—
1975	718	−0.98%
1982	875	+2.87%
1990	1,028	+2.03%
1999	962	−0.73%
2007	986	+0.31%
2012	924	−1.29%
2017	887	−0.81%
2023	852	−0.67%
Source: INSEE

== See also ==
- Communes of the Oise department
