= Nonette (river) =

River in northern France

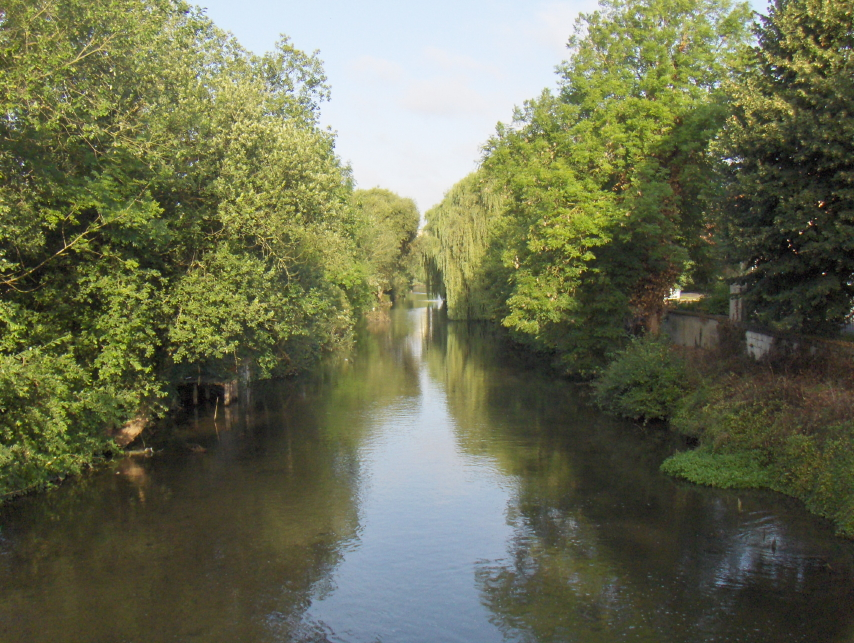

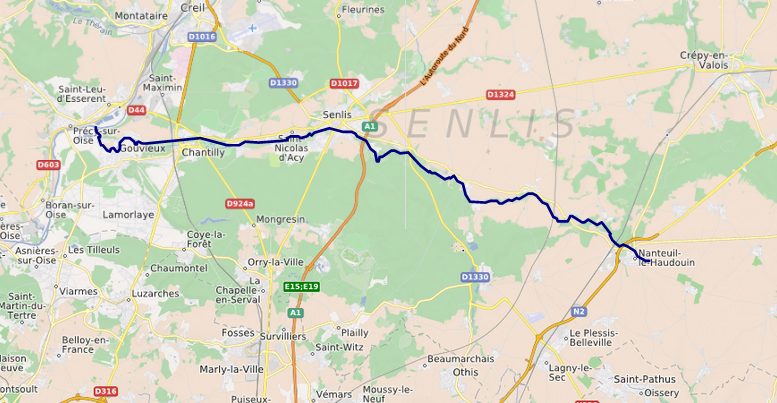

Location
- Country: France

Physical characteristics
- Mouth
  - location: Oise
  - coordinates: 49°12′10″N 2°23′59″E
- Length: 40 km (25 mi)

Basin features
- Progression: Oise→ Seine→ English Channel

The Nonette is a tributary to the river Oise in northern France. It is 40.4 km (25.1 mi) long. Its source is in Nanteuil-le-Haudouin, from which it flows west through Senlis and Chantilly, and joins the Oise near Saint-Leu-d'Esserent.

The river has relatively high turbidity and its brownish water has a modest velocity due to the slight gradient of the watercourse; pH levels have been measured at 9.25 or quite alkaline near the Château d'Ermenonville and electrical conductivity of the waters have tested at 81 micro-siemens per centimetre.
