= Lamorlaye =

- Commune
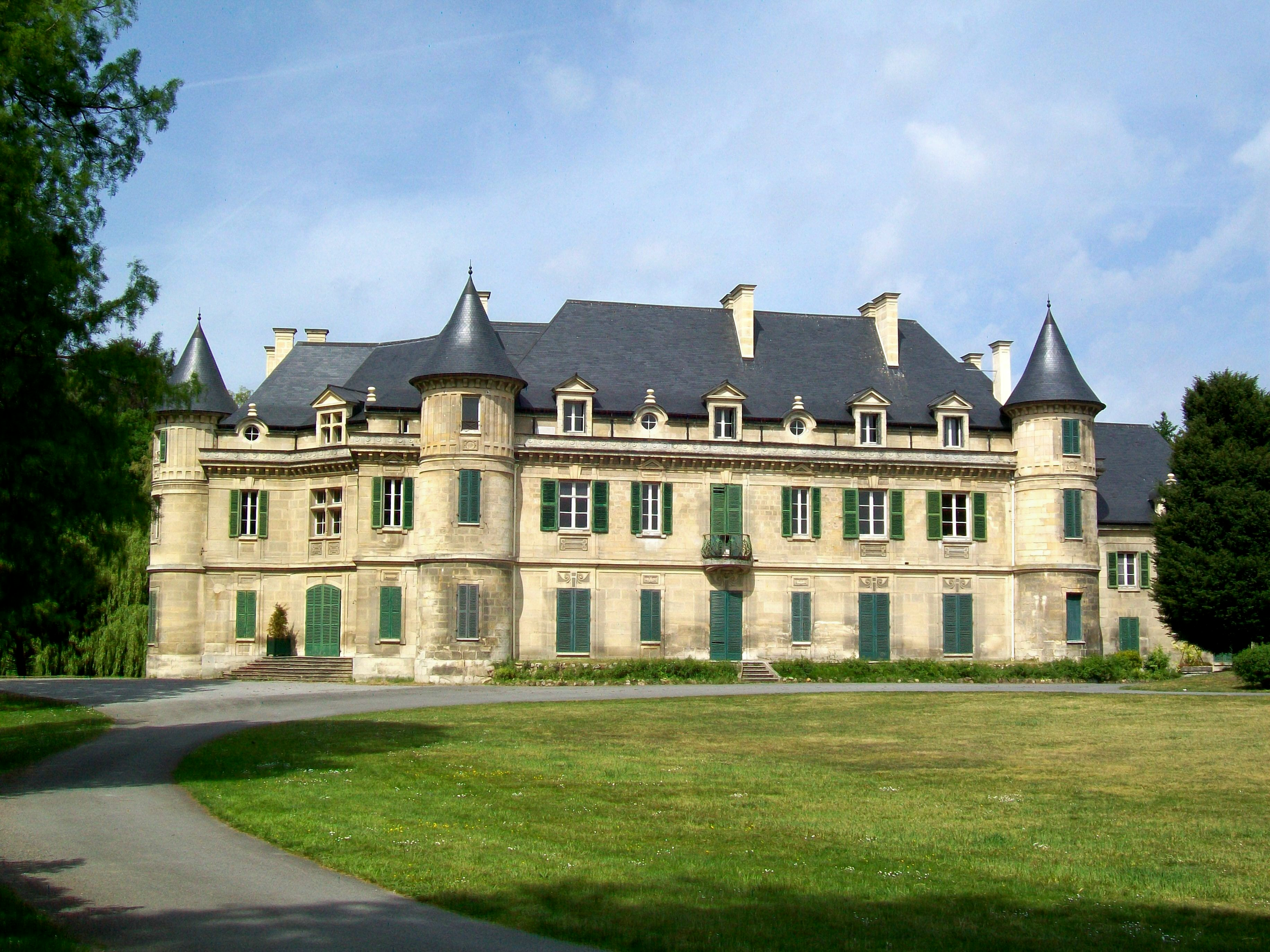
- The chateau in Lamorlaye

- Coat of arms
- Location of Lamorlaye
- Location within France Location within Hauts-de-France
- Coordinates: 49°09′20″N 2°26′30″E
- Country: France
- Region: Hauts-de-France
- Department: Oise
- Arrondissement: Senlis
- Canton: Chantilly
- Intercommunality: Aire cantilienne

Government
  - Mayor (2020–2026): Nicolas Moula
- Area^{1}: 15.34 km^{2} (5.92 sq mi)
- Elevation: 50 m (160 ft)
- Highest elevation: 110 m (360 ft)
- Lowest elevation: 23 m (75 ft)
- Population (2023): 9,082
  - Density: 592.0/km^{2} (1,533/sq mi)
- Time zone: UTC+01:00 (CET)
  - Summer (DST): UTC+02:00 (CEST)
- INSEE/Postal code: 60346 /60260
- ^{1} French Land Register data, which excludes lakes, ponds, glaciers > 1 km^{2} (0.386 sq mi or 247 acres) and river estuaries.

Lamorlaye (French pronunciation: [la mɔʁlɛ]) is a commune in the Oise department in the northern region Hauts-de-France. Its inhabitants are referred to as Morlacuméen(e)s.

== Population ==
Historical population
Year	Pop.	±% p.a.
1968	3,757	—
1975	5,077	+4.40%
1982	6,681	+4.00%
1990	7,709	+1.81%
1999	8,101	+0.55%
2007	9,294	+1.73%
2012	9,211	−0.18%
2017	8,881	−0.73%
2023	9,082	+0.37%
Source: INSEE

== Twin towns ==
Lamorlaye has been twinned with the Northern Irish town of Ballynahinch since 1998.

== See also ==
- Communes of the Oise department
