= 45th Infantry Division (France) =

WWI-era military unit of the French Army

- 45e division d'infanterie
- Active: 1914–1919
- Country: France
- Branch: French Army
- Type: Infantry Division
- Role: Infantry
- Nickname: Turcos
- Engagements: First Battle of the Marne; Battle of the Aisne; First Battle of Artois; Second Battle of Ypres; Battle of Verdun; Battle of the Somme; Battle of the Hills; Battle of the Avre (5 April 1918); Third Battle of the Aisne; Second Battle of the Marne; Meuse–Argonne offensive against the Hindenburg Line; Battle of the Serre

Commanders
- Notable commanders: Stanislas Naulin

The 45th Infantry Division, also known as the 45th Algerian Division, was an infantry division of the French Army that served in World War I. The 45th Division was formed on 19 August 1914 from personnel from Algeria, Morocco, and North Africa in general, within the 19th Military Region; The division consisted primarily of tirailleurs and Zouaves (both types of light infantry). The alleged first gas attack of the Western Front was launched against its positions (among other divisions) north of Ypres on 22 April 1915. Chemical weapons had already been used on the Eastern Front and there are some claims that use on the Western Front occurred prior to 22 April 1915. The division was disbanded on 27 March 1919 at Mainz.

== Commanders ==
- 26 August 26, 1914 : General Antoine Drude
- 3 December 1914 – 23 September 1916 : General Fernand Quiquandon
- 23 September 1916 – 10 June 1918 : General Stanislas Naulin
- 10 June 1918: General Roger Michaud.

== Chain of command ==
- 3 September 1914 to 3 October 1914, within the Sixth Army (France).
- 5 October 1914 to 6 April 1915, within the Tenth Army.
- 13 April 1915 to 11 March 1916, was in the 36th Corps, commanded by General Alexis Hély d'Oissel, within Groupe d'armées du Nord. From 13 April to 22 May 1915, the Corps was formerly known as Détachement d'armée de Belgique, and had been commanded by General Henri Putz.
- 20 April to 30 May 1916, within the Second Army.
- 30 May to August 1916, within the Détachement d'armée de Lorraine.
- 25 August to 26 September 1916, within the Sixth Army, commanded by Émile Fayolle.
- 29 September 1916 to 12 January 1917, was again in the 36th Corps, commanded by General Maurice Balfourier, within Groupe d'armées du Nord.
- 19 May 1917 to 28 March 1918, within the Fifth Army, latterly under the command of General Joseph Alfred Micheller
- 29 March to 29 April 1918, within the First Army, commanded by General Marie-Eugène Debeney
- 29 May 1918 onwards, within the Fifth Army, still under the command of General Joseph Alfred Micheller.

== Chronology ==
=== 1914 ===
Mobilized in the 19th region, from 19 August. (Note: 'In August 1914, the 19th région militaire sent three infantry divisions to France - the 37th, the 38th and the 45th.) 24 August – 6 September : transported by sea to Sète, then by rail to the south of Paris; where its journey temporarily halted. From 3 September, redeployed to the Le Mesnil-Amelot region.

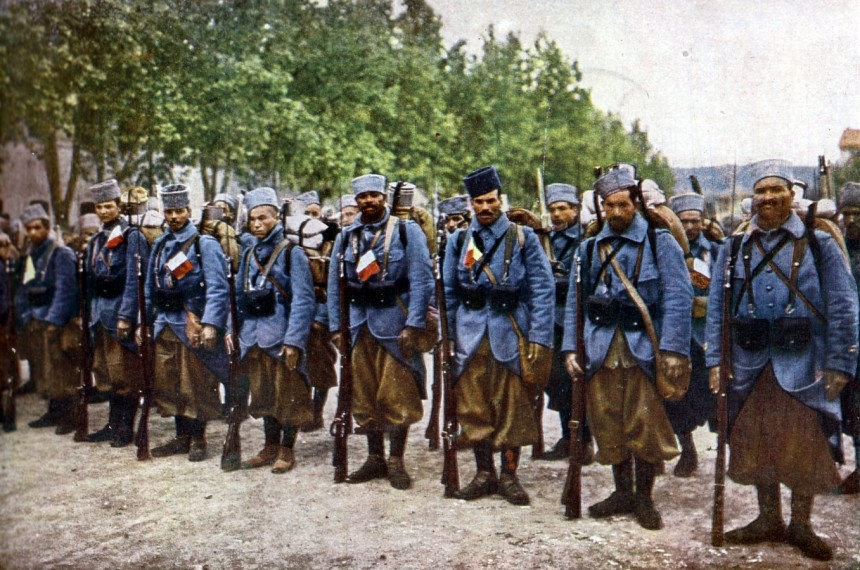
Tirailleurs algériens in France during 1914

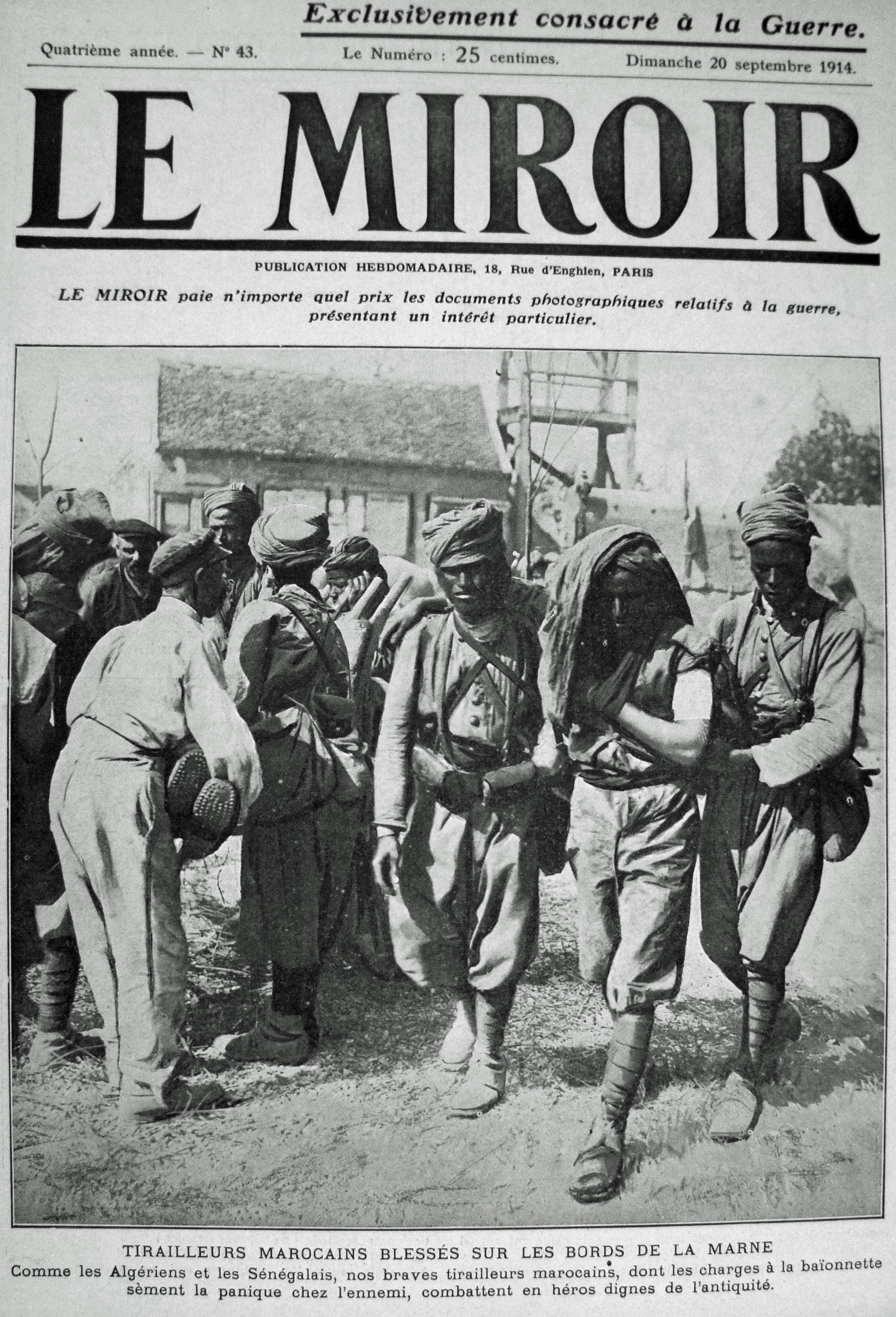
Tirailleurs marocains wounded on the banks of the Marne, September 1914.

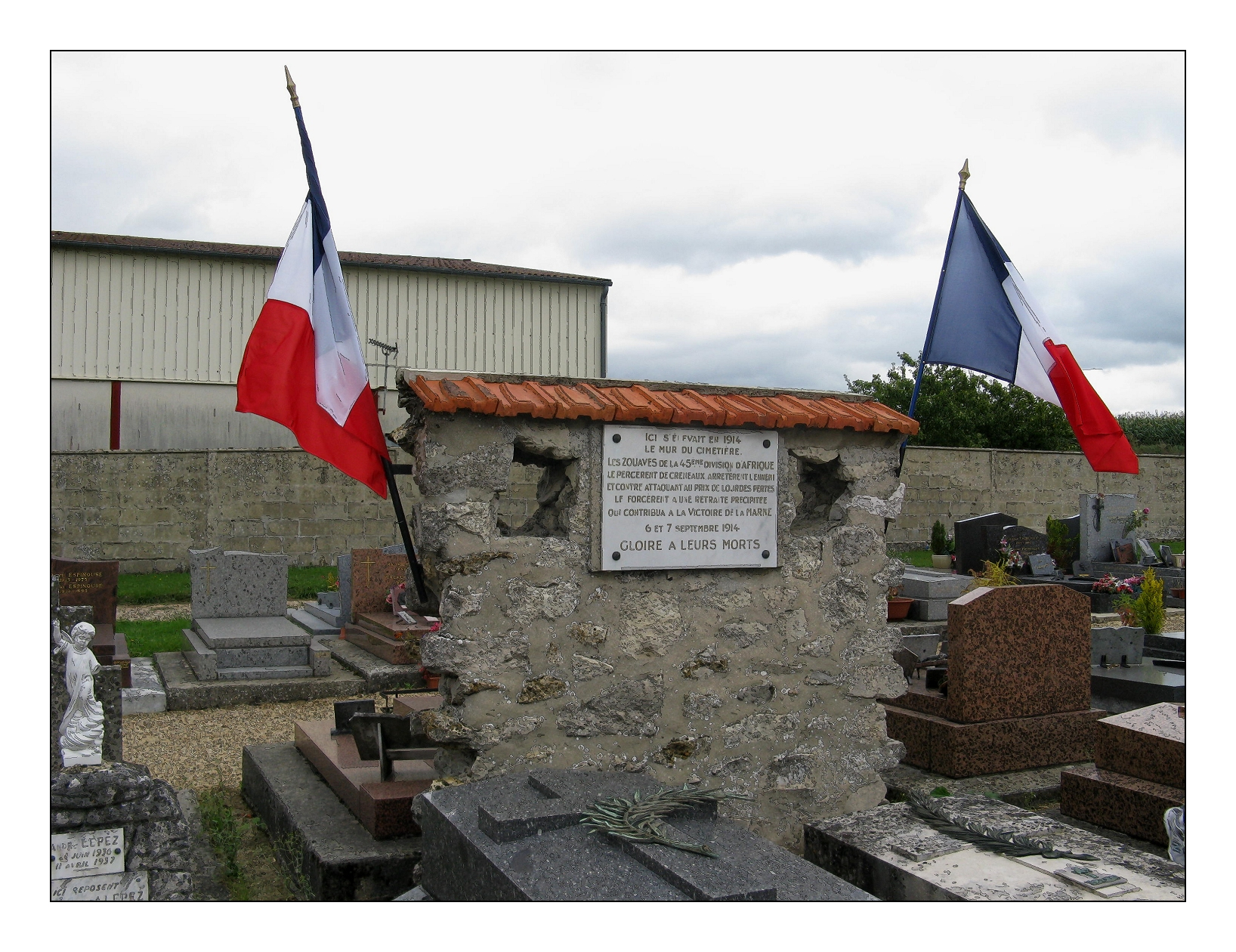
Monument in memory of the defence of the Chambry cemetery by the Zouaves of the 45th Division on 6 and 7 September 1914.

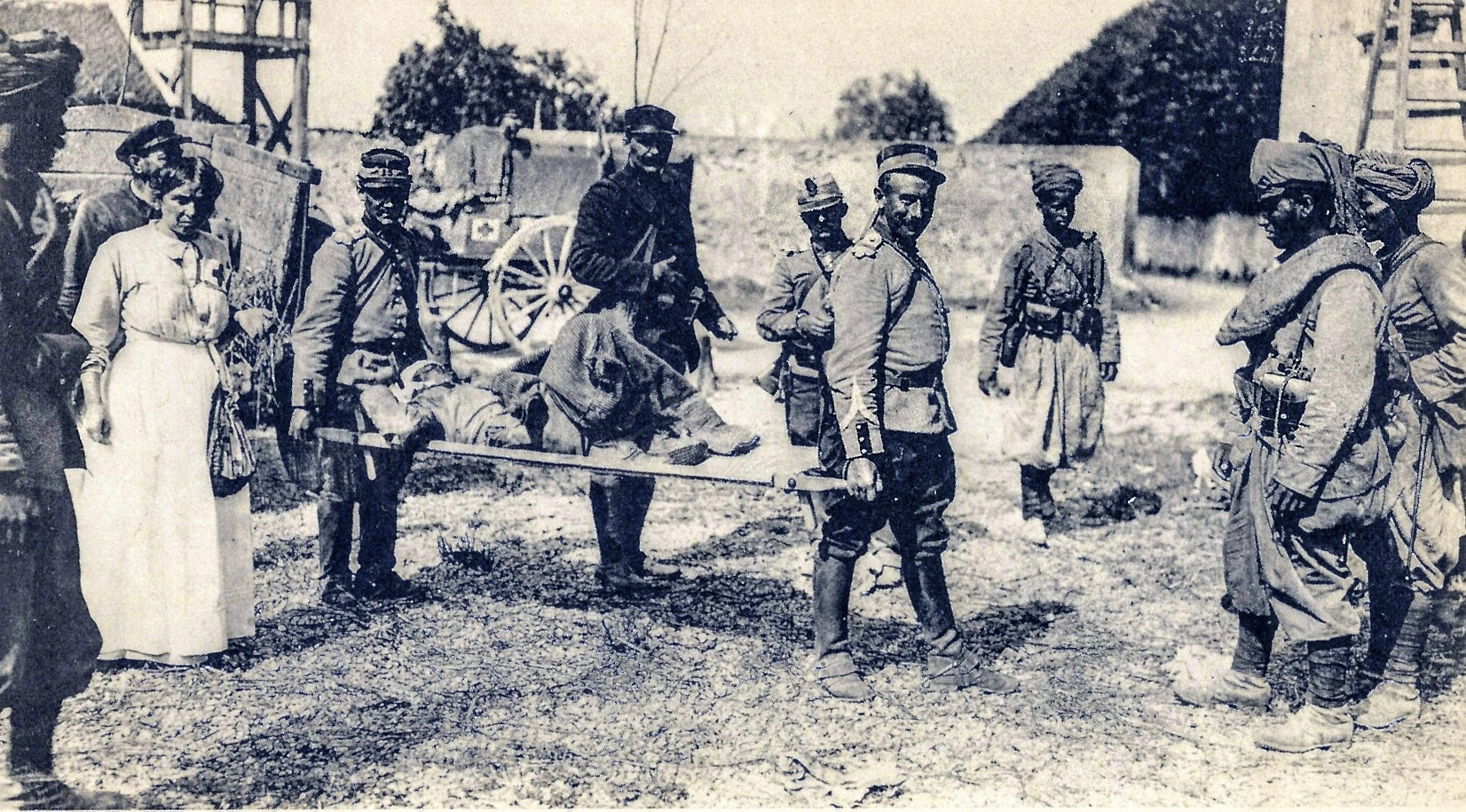
Elements of the cavalry corps assist with the evacuation of the wounded of the Moroccan brigade, who have seized Penchard. Battle of the Marne, 8 September 1914.

6–13 September : engaged in the First Battle of the Marne. From 6 to 10 September, Battle of the Ourcq. Took part in the fighting towards Penchard, Chambry, Aisne, Barcy and Étrépilly, Seine-et-Marne. From 10 September, continued via Lizy-sur-Ourcq and Longpont (with the British Expeditionary Force), as far as Soissons. 13 September – 3 October : engaged in the first battle of the Aisne. Crossed the Aisne (river) towards Soissons and repeated fighting north of Crouy. Then stabilisation of the front and occupation of a sector in this region. On 23 and 30 September, French attacks towards the Perrière farm and north of the Montagne Neuve farm.

3 October 1914 – 25 February 1915: withdrawal from the front and transport by railway to the Arras region. Engaged, from 5 October, in the First Battle of Artois. Fighting in the region of Bailleul-Sir-Berthoult, Roclincourt, Thélus and Écurie. Stabilization and occupation of a sector towards Roclincourt and La Targette (mine warfare). 31 October : front extended to the right towards the Maison Blanche. 5 November : Took part in the fighting towards Écurie and north. 16 November : reduced front on the left to the south of La Targette. 28 November : German attack towards Écurie; from 27 to 29 November French counter-attacks. 7–8 December : new German attacks and French counter-attacks. 17–18 February 1915 : French attacks.

=== 1915 ===
25 February – 13 April : withdrawn from the front line to Avesnes-le-Comte; rest, then from 30 March sent to Doullens; refresher training. (Elements in sector with the 10th Army Corps (France), to Arras up to 2 March). From 6 April, transport by rail from the Doullens region to the south of Bergues. 13 April – 8 June : moved to the front line, to occupy of a sector towards Poelkapelle and Langemark (flanking the British Army). 22 April : German gas attack during the Second Battle of Ypres; (Note: The French troops in the path of the gas cloud suffered 2,000–3,000 casualties, with 800 to 1,400 fatalities.) French counter-attacks. Then occupied of a new sector towards Boezinge and Het-Sas. 16–17 May : French attacks on Hill 17 towards Pilkem. 20–21 May : German counter-attacks. 23 May : sector moved, right towards Wieltje and Boezinge. 30 May : new French attacks on Hill 17. 8 June – 30 September : relief by the British Second Army; bypass movement to the north, then occupied a new sector on the Yser, towards Boezinge and Steenstrate (flanking the British and Belgian armies). 30 September 1915 – 11 March 1916 : withdrew from the front line to the south-east of Bergues; rest and refresher training. From 21 November, elements in the Nieuwpoort sector.

=== 1916 ===
11 March – 9 May : transported by rail in the Crépy-en-Valois region; rest. From 18 March, moved in stages to Jonchery-sur-Vesle; rest and work. From 20 April, transported by rail in the Sainte-Menehould region and rest in that of Triaucourt. 9–23 May : moved to the front line. Engaged in the Battle of Verdun between La Hayette and Avocourt Wood. Fighting in Camard wood. 23 May–9 June : withdrew from the front line to the west of Saint-Dizier; rest. From 30 May, transport by rail in the Châtel-sur-Moselle region; rest. 9 June – 9 August : moved to the front line, occupied a sector between Vezouze and Chapelotte. 9 August – 1 September : withdrawal from the front line to Rambervillers; rest. From 12 August, sent to the Saffais camp; refresher training. 25 August, transported by rail to the Grandvilliers region; rest.

1–16 September : transport by trucks to Fouilloy. Committed from 4 September in the Battle of the Somme, deployed towards the Hôpital farm and the Forest. On 13, 14 and 15 September, French attacks. 16 September – 6 October : withdrawal from the front line to Formerie; rest. From 29 September, transported by rail to the Dunkirk region; rest. 6 October 1916 – 12 January 1917 : moved to the front line, to occupy a sector between Nieuport and Saint-Georges.

=== 1917 ===
12 January – 16 February : withdrawal from the front, transport by rail from Dunkirk to Chantilly; refresher training at the Pontarmé training camp and from 7 February, rest in Neuilly-en-Thelle. 16 February – 4 March : employed on working parties at Fitz-James, for the entrenched camp of Paris. 4 – 15 March : moved to the front line, to occupy a sector towards Beuvraignes and the Bois des Loges (excluded). 15 March – 2 April : withdrew from the front line to Montdidier, employed on working parties, then from 27 March transported by rail to Mailly-le-Camp; rest. 2 – 22 April : moved to the front line, via Mourmelon-le-Petit, then on the 5 April occupied the sector north of Prosnes. Engaged from 17 to 20 April in the Battle of the Hills (capture of Mount Haut and the Casque). 11 April – 19 May : withdrew from the front line, moved to Mourmelon-le-Grand; at rest in the vicinity of La Chaussée-sur-Marne.

19 May – 18 August : transported by rail to the front line and from 26 May, occupied a sector situated towards La Neuville-au-Pont and the north of Loivre. 18 August – 14 September : withdrawal from the front; rest at Verneuil (the 90th brigade is left in the sector until 22 August). 14 September – 6 October : occupied a sector in the Sapigneul region, la Miette. 6 – 22 October : withdrawal from the front line, moved to Chaumuzy, then rest at Saint-Martin-d'Ablois. 22 October – 11 December : moved to the front line, and occupied the sector towards Sapigneul and the south of Godat. From 16 November, ring road movement and took up positions in a new sector between Courcy and the south of Godat. 11 December 1917 – 26 January 1918 : withdrew from the front line to Damery; rest and refresher training.

=== 1918 ===
26 January – 29 March : moved to the front line, occupied the sector towards Courcy, Marne and Bétheny. 29 March – 28 April : withdrew from the front line, was transported by trucks to the Vendeuil region. Engaged on 5 April in the Battle of the Avre (Second Battle of Picardy). Contributed to stopping the German offensive during violent fighting between Grivesnes and the west of Montdidier. 28 April – 20 May : withdrew from the front line, moved to Nivillers; from 30 April, transported by rail to Épernay; rest and refresher training in the vicinity of Tours-sur-Marne, then from 17 May moved to Ville-en-Tardenois. 20 May – 2 June : moved to the Saint-Thierry massif, the next day, 21 May, occupied a sector towards Courcy and Loivre. From 27 May, engaged in the Third Battle of the Aisne (with the British IX Corps). Put up resistance on the Vesle, then southwest of Reims, towards Rosnay, Marne and Ormes, Marne.

2 June – 6 August : withdrew from the front line to Mareuil-sur-Ay; rest. On 4 July, occupied a sector between Prunay and the Fort de la Pompelle. Engaged on 15 July in the Fourth Battle of Champagne. Resistance to the German shock. 2 August, bypass movement; engaged towards Rosnay and Gueux, Marne in the Second Battle of the Marne. 6 August – 8 September : occupied a sector on the Vesle, towards Muizon and to the east. 8–20 September : withdrew from the front line, moved to Arcis-le-Ponsart; then occupied a sector between the west of Romain, Marne and the south of Glennes. From 16 September, engaged between the Vesle and the Aisne in the push towards the Hindenburg position. Fighting moved towards Glennes and 14 September towards l'arbre de Romain. 20 September – 8 October : organisation of the positions conquered north of the Vesle between the west of Romain and the south of Glennes. On 27 September, front extended to the left as far as the north-east of Baslieux-lès-Fismes. 8 October – 5 November: withdrew from the front line, movement towards Muizon. From 10 October, occupied a sector on the Suippe, towards Burgundy; then progressed towards the region of Saint-Germainmont, Le Thour (Battle of the Serre). Organization in this region of a reduced sector on the left, 24 October to the north of Saint-Germainmont. 5–11 November : withdrew from the front line to Condé-en-Brie; rest.

== Order of battle ==
=== 1914 ===
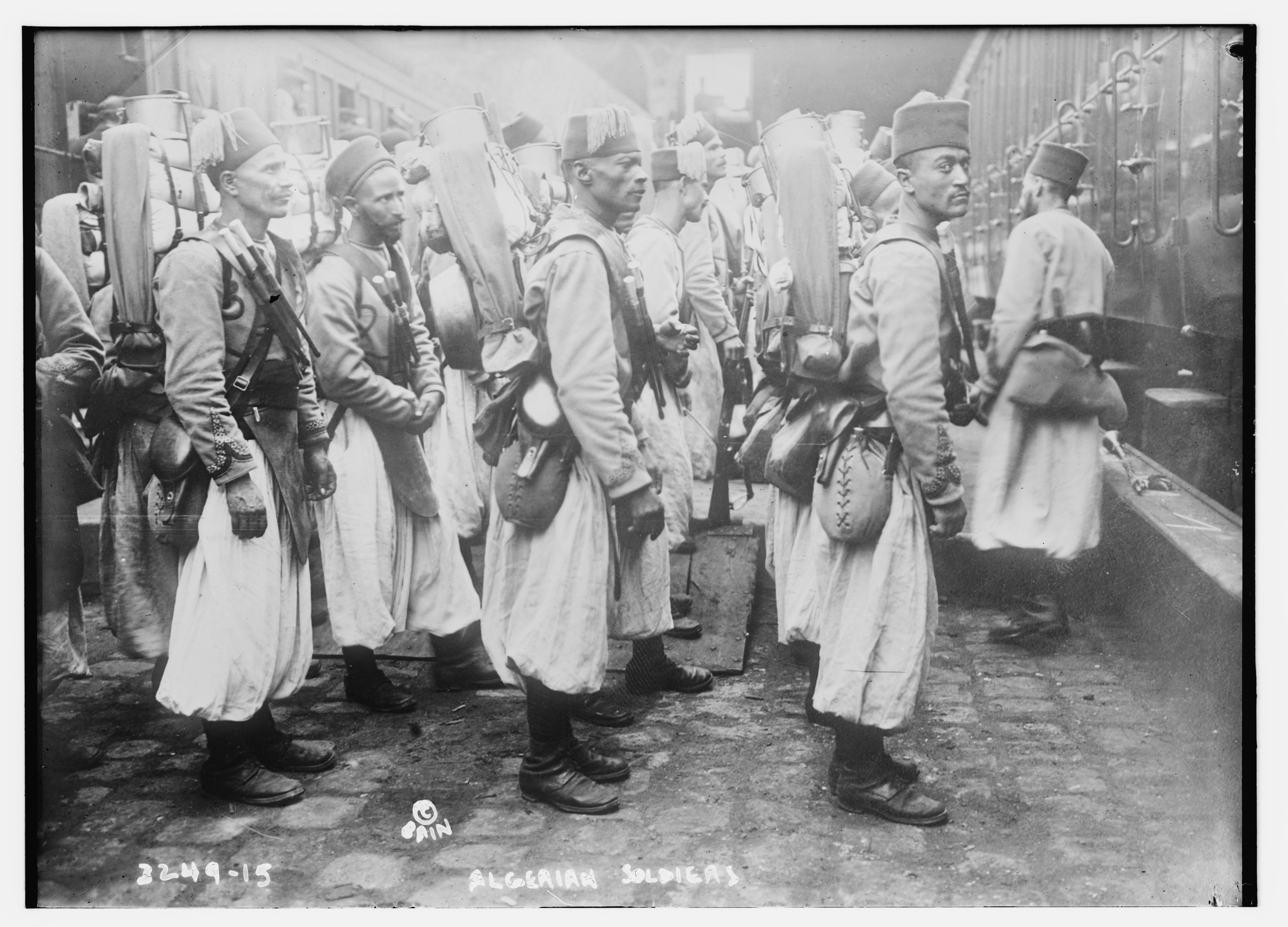
Tirailleurs algériens taking the train in 1914

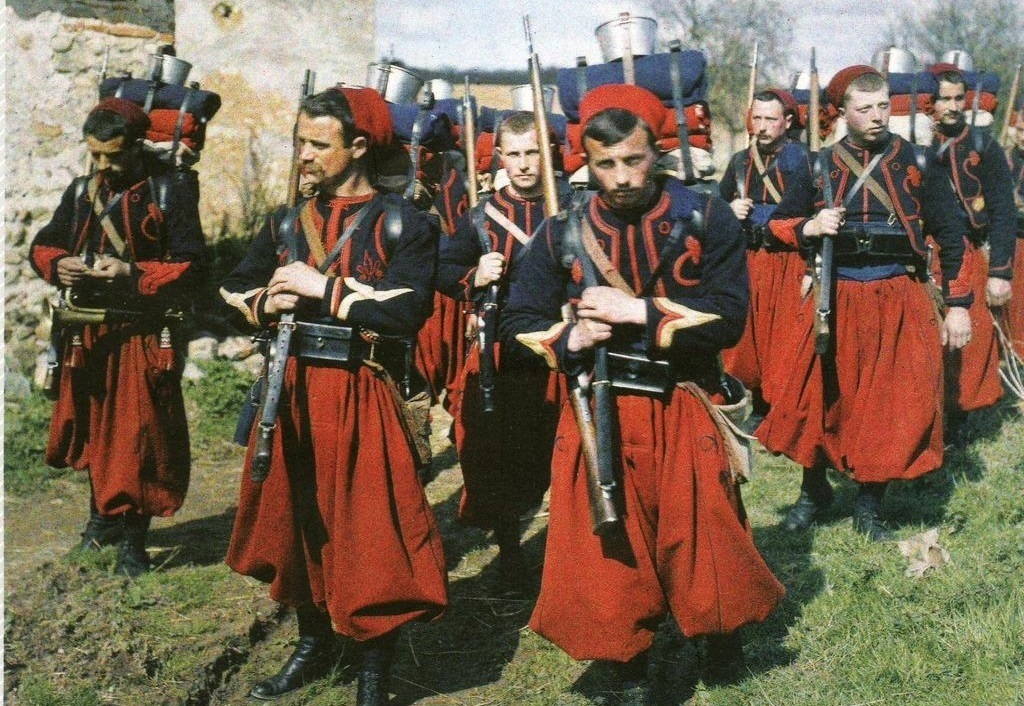
Early WW1 colour photograph of French Zouaves

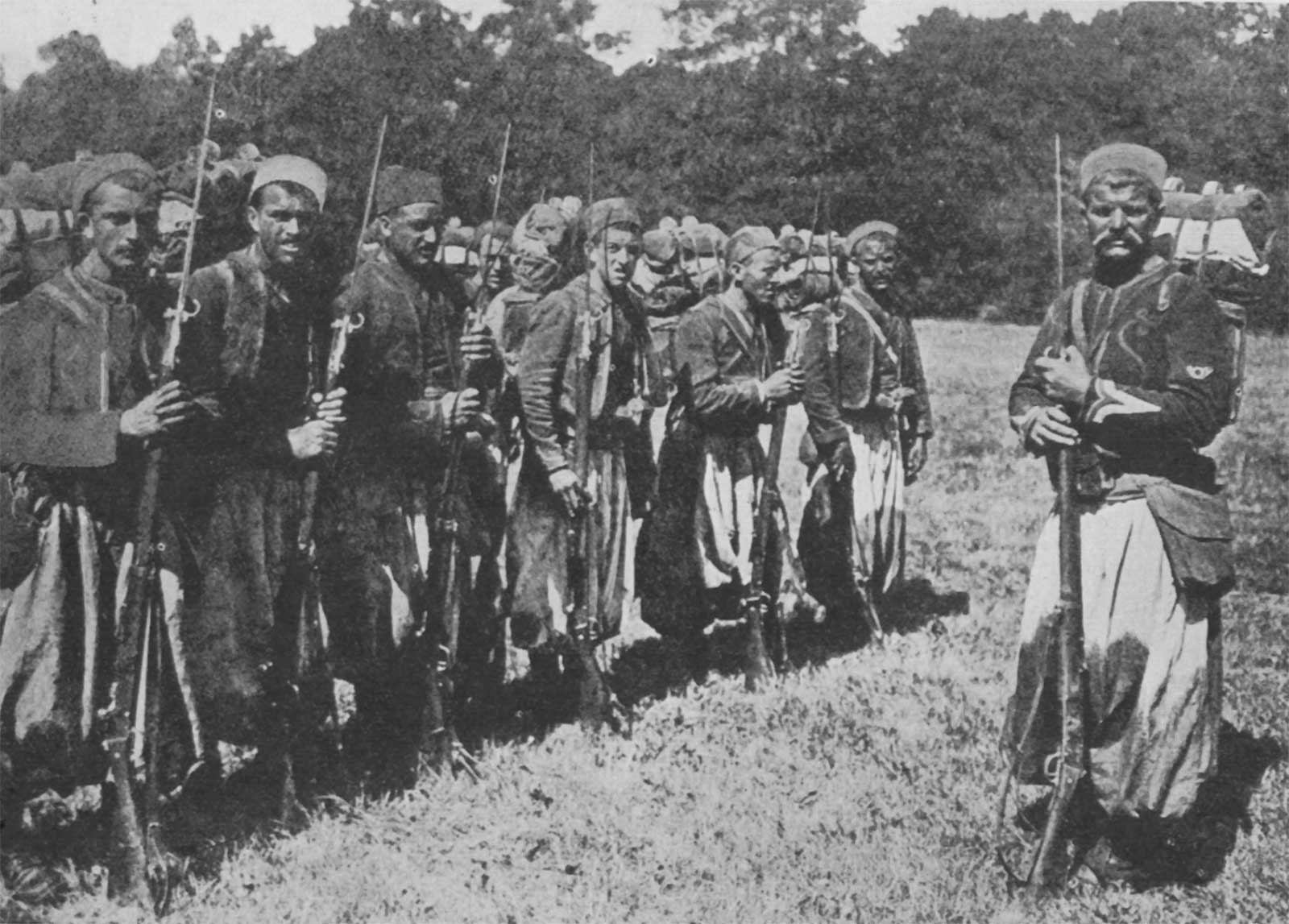
French Zouaves in the First World War

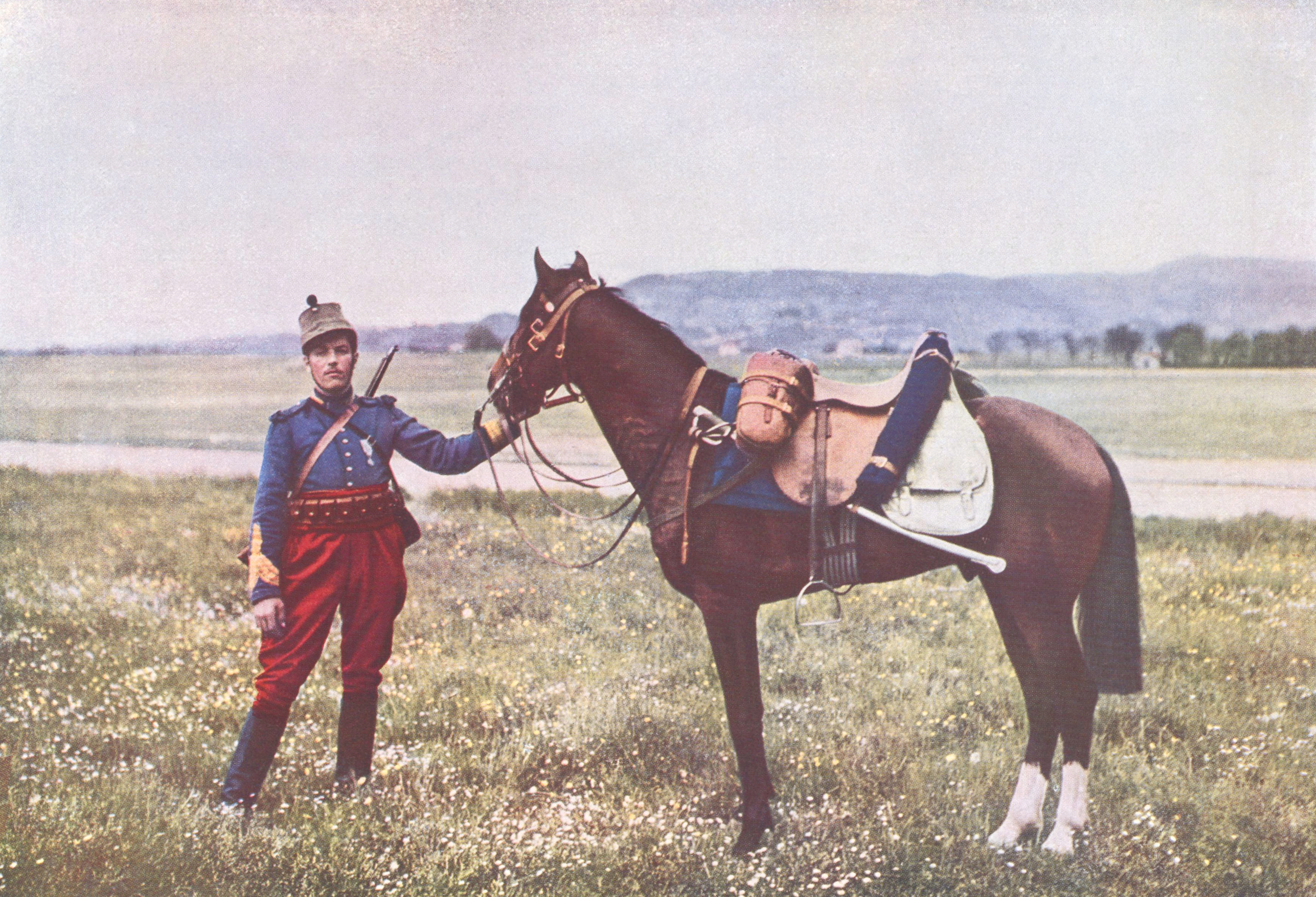
A chasseurs d'Afrique soldier at the First Battle of the Marne, 1914

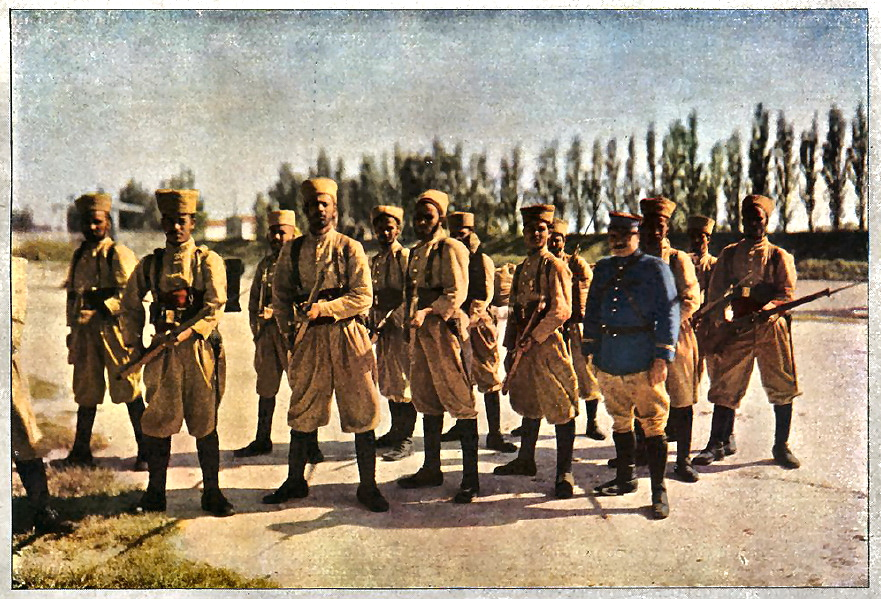
Tirailleurs marocains in 1914.

On 5 September, the division was created, with four régiments at its core, three of Zouaves, one of tirailleurs algériens, each regiment comprising three infantry battalions.

- 89th Brigade

Régiment de marche du 1er zouaves
Régiment de marche du 3e zouaves

- 90th Brigade

Régiment de marche du 2e zouaves
Régiment de marche du 2e régiment de tirailleurs algériens

- Divisional organic elements

Divisional cavalry: Régiment de marche of Chasseurs d'Afrique from the 1st and 2nd Regiments
Artillery: a divisional artillery with 3 groups
Engineers: a field company of sappers
Lines of communication: a detachment of telegraphists, a reserve of medical equipment, Sanitary Sections, a group of stretcher-bearers, 4 Field Ambulances, 4 hospital sections.
Logistics: Divisional Train, Supply section, Horse Transport section, 1 auxiliary convoy, supply section's Field Bakeries and Butcheries, Motor Ambulance Convoy.

From 8 September to 5 October 1914, a Brigade of Moroccan tirailleurs under the command of General Ditte composed of two regiments (one of 3 battalions under the command of Colonel Touchard and one of 2 battalions under the command of Major Joseph-François Poeymirau) was assigned as reinforcements to the 45th Division, and fought during the First Battle of the Marne. Among their ranks was Lieutenant Alphonse Juin, early in his military career.

=== 1915 ===
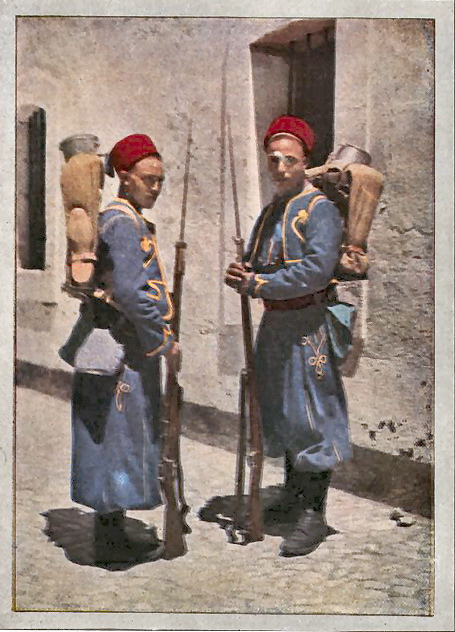
Tirailleurs algériens in their old "Turcos" uniform. It was replaced with khaki battledress as the war progressed.

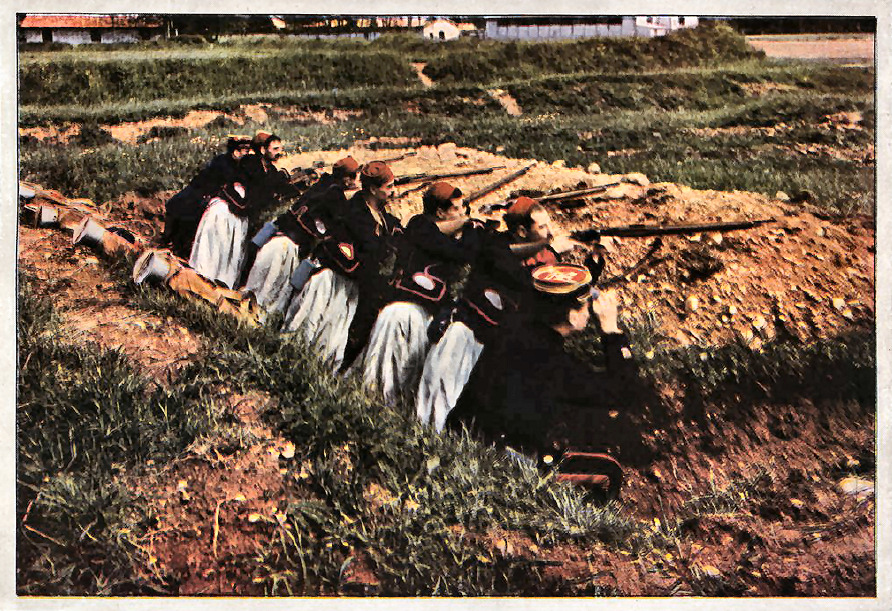
For the benefit of the photographer, a re-enactment of the 2nd Zouaves in a trench near Barcy-Chambry in September 1914. Probably done in 1915.

1 January 1915

- 89th Brigade

Régiment de marche du 7e zouaves – name change, had been the 1st
Régiment de marche du 5e zouaves – name change, had been the 3rd

- 90th Brigade

Régiment de marche du 3e zouaves – name change, had been the 2nd
Régiment de marche du 6e régiment de tirailleurs algériens – name change, had been the 2nd

1 July 1915

- 89th Brigade

3e régiment mixte de zouaves et tirailleurs – Régiment de marche du 7e zouaves, name change, comprised two Zouave battalions and a battalion of tirailleurs tunisiens
3e Régiment bis de zouaves – name change, had been the 5th

- 90th Brigade

2e Régiment bis de zouaves – name change, had been the 3e régiment de marche de zouaves, sent to the Macedonian front in November 1915 to join the Armée d'Orient (1915–1919).
Régiment de marche du 1er régiment de tirailleurs algériens – name change, had been the 6th

=== 1916 ===
- 89e brigade

3e régiment mixte de zouaves et tirailleurs, no change
3e régiment bis de zouaves, no change

- 90e brigade

1er et 3e Bataillon d'Infanterie Légère d'Afrique
1er régiment de marche de tirailleurs algériens, no change

=== 1918 ===
3e régiment bis de zouaves, no change
1er régiment de marche de tirailleurs algériens, no change
1st, 2nd and 3rd Light Infantry Battalions of Africa

The 2nd African Light Infantry Battalion joined the 45th Division during the summer of 1918 to form a group of battalions composed of the 1st, 2nd, and 3rd.

== Bibliography ==
- Altairac, Lieutenant-Colonel; et al., eds. (1935). Bataille de la Somme (fin). Offensives françaises à Verdun. Tome IV. Troisième Volume. (3 septembre - fin décembre 1916) [4,3]. Les armées françaises dans la Grande guerre. Based on Official Documents by Direction of the Ministère De la Guerre, Etat-Major de l'Armée – Service Historique (in French). Paris: Imprimerie Nationale.
- Beaugier, Fernand Auguste; et al., eds. (1931). Les opérations à objectifs limités (1er novembre 1916 - 1er novembre 1917) Tome V. Premier Volume. L'offensive d'avril 1917 (1er novembre 1916 - 15 mai 1917) [5,1]. Les armées françaises dans la Grande guerre. Based on Official Documents by Direction of the Ministère De la Guerre, Etat-Major de l'Armée – Service Historique (in French). Paris: Imprimerie Nationale.
- Berthemet, Capitaine Henry; Lefévre, Chef d'Escadron d'artillerie, eds. (1934). L'hiver 1917-1918. - L'offensive allemande (1er novembre 1917 - 18 juillet 1918) Tome VI. Deuxième volume. L'offensive allemande contre les armées françaises (1er mai - 18 juillet 1918) [6,2]. Les armées françaises dans la Grande guerre. Based on Official Documents by Direction of the Ministère De la Guerre, Etat-Major de l'Armée – Service Historique (in French). Paris: Imprimerie Nationale.
- Besson, Chef d'Escadron d'artillerie; et al., eds. (1931). La guerre de mouvement (opérations antérieures au 14 novembre 1914). Tome I. Troisième Volume. La bataille de la Marne. [1,3]. Les armées françaises dans la Grande guerre. Based on Official Documents by Direction of the Ministère De la Guerre, Etat-Major de l'Armée – Service Historique (in French). Paris: Imprimerie Nationale.
- Carré, Henri; et al., eds. (1925). La guerre de mouvement (opérations antérieures au 14 novembre 1914). Tome I. Deuxième volume. La manoeuvre en retraite et les préliminaires de la bataille de la Marne. [1,2]. Les armées françaises dans la Grande guerre. Based on Official Documents by Direction of the Ministère De la Guerre, Etat-Major de l'Armée – Service Historique (in French). Paris: Imprimerie Nationale.
- De Feriet, René; et al., eds. (1938). La campagne offensive de 1918 et la marche au Rhin (18 juillet 1918 - 28 juin 1919) Tome VII. Deuxième volume. La campagne offensive de 1918 et la marche au Rhin (26 septembre 1918 - 28 juin 1919) [7,2]. Les armées françaises dans la Grande guerre. Based on Official Documents by Direction of the Ministère De la Guerre, Etat-Major de l'Armée – Service Historique (in French). Paris: Imprimerie Nationale.
- Edmonds, J. E.; Wynne, G. C. (1995) [1927]. Military Operations France and Belgium, 1915: Winter 1915: Battle of Neuve Chapelle: Battles of Ypres. History of the Great War. Vol. I (Imperial War Museum and Battery Press ed.). London: Macmillan. ISBN 978-0-89839-218-0.
- Edmonds, J. E. (1928). Military Operations France and Belgium, 1915: Battles of Aubers Ridge, Festubert, and Loos. History of the Great War Based on Official Documents By Direction of the Historical Section of the Committee of Imperial Defence. Vol. II (1st ed.). London: Macmillan. OCLC 58962526.
- Edmonds, J. E. (1939). Military Operations: France and Belgium, May–July: The German Diversion Offensives and the First Allied Counter-Offensive. History of the Great War based on Official Documents by Direction of the Committee of Imperial Defence. Vol. III (1st ed.). London: Macmillan. OCLC 220616786.
- Greenhalgh, Elizabeth (2014). The French Army and the First World War. Cambridge: Cambridge University Press. ISBN 978-1-107-60568-8.
- Herlaut, Auguste Philippe; et al., eds. (1931). La stabilisation du front - Les attaques locales (14 novembre 1914 - 1er mai 1915) Tome II. [2]. Les armées françaises dans la Grande guerre. Based on Official Documents by Direction of the Ministère De la Guerre, Etat-Major de l'Armée – Service Historique (in French). Paris: Imprimerie Nationale.
- Huré, Robert, ed. (1977). L'Armée d'Afrique : 1830-1962. Paris: Charles-Lavauzelle. OCLC 757208988.
- Larcade, Jean-Louis (2000). Zouaves et Tirailleurs: les régiments de marche et les régiments mixtes (1914-1918), Vol I. Livet, Normandie: Editions des Argonautes. ISBN 2-95-151710-6.
- Larcade, Jean-Louis (2001). Zouaves et Tirailleurs: les régiments de marche et les régiments mixtes (1914-1918), Vol II. Livet, Normandie: Editions des Argonautes. ISBN 2-95-151711-4.
- Laure, Lieutenant-Colonel; et al., eds. (1923). La campagne offensive de 1918 et la marche au Rhin (18 juillet 1918 - 28 juin 1919) Tome VII. Premier volume. Les offensives de dégagement et la préparation des offensives générales (18 juillet 1918 - 25 septembre 1918) [7,1]. Les armées françaises dans la Grande guerre. Based on Official Documents by Direction of the Ministère De la Guerre, Etat-Major de l'Armée – Service Historique (in French). Paris: Imprimerie Nationale.
- Pompé, Daniel; et al., eds. (1924). Ordres de bataille des grandes unités – Divisions d'Infanterie, Divisions de Cavalerie. Tome X. 2e Volume. [10,2]. Les armées françaises dans la Grande guerre. Based on Official Documents by Direction of the Ministère De la Guerre, Etat-Major de l'Armée – Service Historique (in French) (1st ed.). Paris: Imprimerie Nationale.
- Tournés, René; et al., eds. (1931). L'hiver 1917-1918. - L'offensive allemande (1er novembre 1917 - 18 juillet 1918) Tome VI. Premier volume. La préparation de la campagne de 1918. L'offensive allemande de l'Oise à la Mer du Nord (1er novembre 1917 - 30 avril 1918) [6,1]. Les armées françaises dans la Grande guerre. Based on Official Documents by Direction of the Ministère De la Guerre, Etat-Major de l'Armée – Service Historique (in French). Paris: Imprimerie Nationale.
