= 87th Territorial Infantry Division =

French WWI-era military unit

- 87e division d’infanterie territoriale
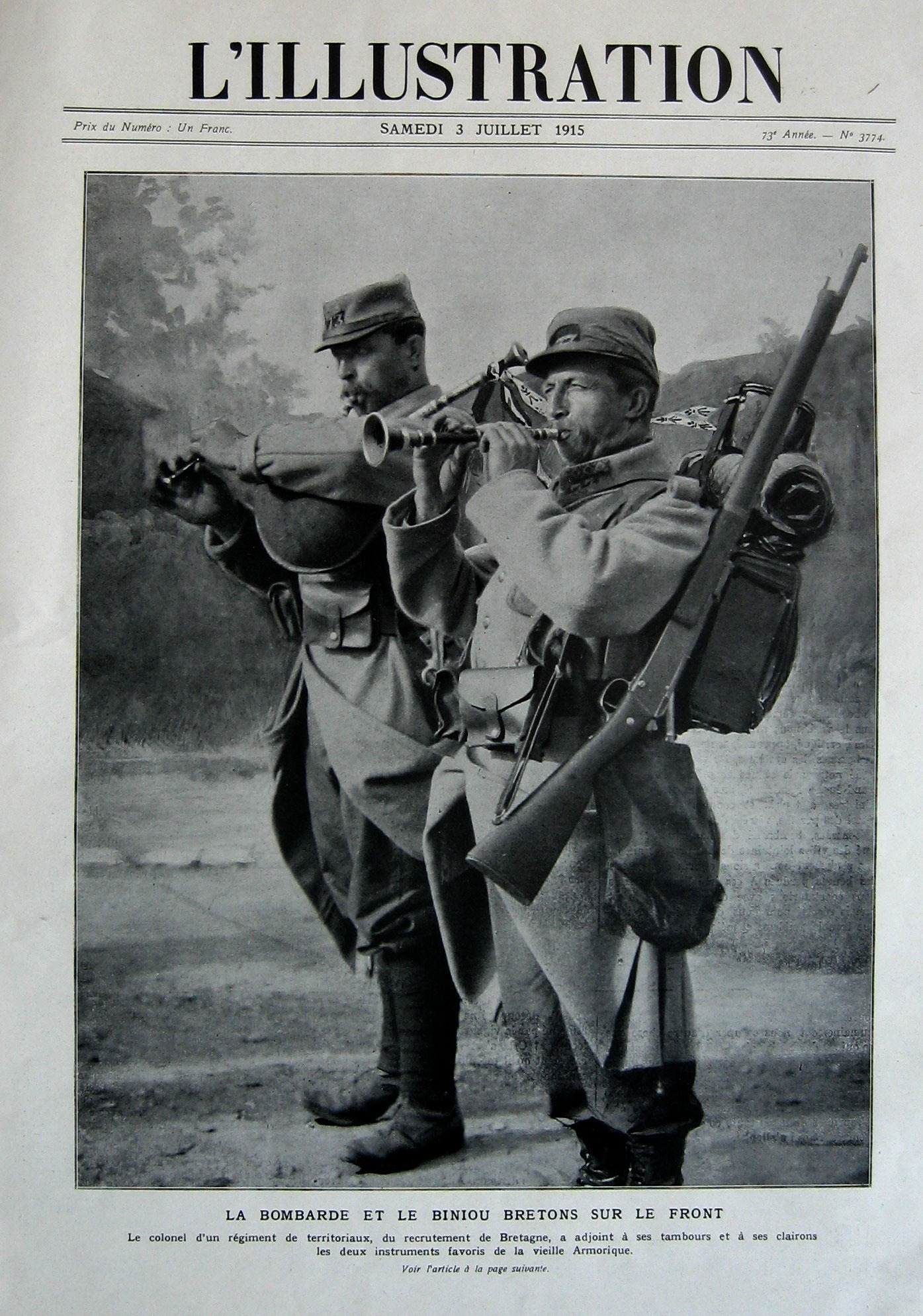
- Two Breton soldiers, from the 73rd Territorial Infantry Regiment of Guingamp, playing Binioù and bombarde
- Active: August 1914; 5 April 1917
- Country: France
- Branch: French Army
- Type: Infantry
- Size: Division
- Engagements: First Battle of Ypres; Battle of the Yser; Second Battle of Ypres

The 87th Territorial Infantry Division was a WWI-era infantry division of the French Army. It was composed of older reservists from the 10th Military District, headquartered in Rennes. Personnel were generally recruited from Normandy and Brittany.

The alleged first gas attack of the Western Front was launched north of Ypres on 22 April 1915, against its positions (among other divisions) that were occupied by the 73rd and 74th regiments. Chemical weapons had already been used on the Eastern Front and there are some claims that use on the Western Front occurred prior to 22 April 1915.

== Commanders ==
- 24 April 1915 - 5 April 1917: général Maurice Joppé

== Composition ==
Mobilised in the 10th région.

- 76e Régiment d'infanterie territoriale from August 1914 to June 1916
- 79e Régiment d'infanterie territoriale from August 1914 to June 1916
- 80e Régiment d'infanterie territoriale from August 1914 to June 1916
- 73e Régiment d'infanterie territoriale from August 1914 to April 1917
- 74e Régiment d'infanterie territoriale from August 1914 to April 1917
- 100e Régiment d'infanterie territoriale from April to August 1915
- 102e Régiment d'infanterie territoriale from April to August 1915
- 11e Régiment d'infanterie territoriale from June 1916 to April 1917
- 12e Régiment d'infanterie territoriale from June 1916 to April 1917

== Chronology ==
=== 1914 ===
6 August – 7 October Transported by rail, from Saint-Servan, to Valognes; performed coastal guard in this region. From 26 August, transported by sea and by rail to the Le Havre region; employed on works parties and defensive duties. From 5 October, transported by sea to Dunkirk. 7 – 24 October Moved to Ypres. From 14 October, occupation and defense of the Zillebeke region, Pilkem; employed on working parties. 22 October, fighting around Bikschote. 24 October – 17 November Relieved a British division towards Langemark and Steenstrate. Engaged in the First Battle of Ypres: fighting towards Weidendreft, Mangelaare and Kortekeer Cabaret. 17 November – 6 December Withdrawal from the front; rest towards Killem, then work towards Elverdinge and Dikkebus. 6 December 1914 – 24 January 1915 Moved to the front line and occupied a sector of the Yser Canal, towards the Knocke bridge, the Drie Grachten bridge and Kortekeer Cabaret, reduced on the right, 30 December, moved up to the Maison du Passeur during the Battle of the Yser.

=== 1915 ===
24 – 29 January Withdrew from the front line to Proven, (relieved by the Belgian Army), and rest. 29 January – 30 March Moved to the front line and occupied a sector towards Poelkapelle and Steenstrate. (Note: From 11 March 1915, a brigade of the 89th TID is at the disposal of the 87th TID. From 14 to 30 March, the two brigades of the 89th TID are under the orders of the 87th TID) 30 March – 13 April Withdrew from the front line towards Socx, and rest. (Note: From 30 March to 9 April 1915, one of the brigades is made available to the 89th TID. From 9 to 13 April, the two brigades are at the disposal of the 89th TID) 13 April – 21 May Moved to the front line and occupied a sector towards Langemarck and Steenstrate. (Note: From 17 April to 26 August 1915, the 87th TID was increased by a territorial brigade.) 22 April, Second Battle of Ypres. German gas attack; violent French counter-attacks; then occupation, by elements, of a new sector on the Yser, north of Boezinge. 21 May – 30 September Withdrew from the front line towards Rexpoëde (elements in sector towards Steenstrate and Boesinghe), and rest. (Note: From 25 August 1915, one of the three brigades is transported by rail to the Bruay region. On 1 September, it reconstitutes, at the 21st Army Corps, the 81st TID with one of the brigades of this division.) 30 September 1915 – 26 February 1916 Moved to the front line and occupied a sector towards Steenstrate and Boesinghe, in liaison with the Belgian and British armies.

=== 1916 ===
26 February – 18 May Withdrawal from the front; stationing near Rexpoëde: elements of the 87th TID participate in the organization of the defence of Dunkirk and the occupation of the sector of the 36th Army Corps (France). 18 May – 5 June Occupied the sector towards Steenstraate and Boesinghe. 5 – 15 June Withdrawn from the front line, and from 7 June, transported by rail to Estrées-Saint-Denis; rest. 15 June – 8 December Moved to the front line and occupied a sector towards Belval and the Oise, reduced on the left, on 2 December, up to Ecouvillon. 18 December 1916 – 26 February 1917 Withdrawal from the front; rest towards Grandfresnoy and Sacy-le-Grand. From 27 December, employed on working parties in the regions of Villers-Cotterêts, Senlis, Ressons-sur-Matz and Creil.

=== 1917 ===
26 February – 12 March Refresher training at the Pontarmé camp. 12 – 17 March Movement towards Compiègne, then occupied the sector between the Oise and the Ecouvillon. 17 – 18 March Pursuit of the enemy (German retreat): capture of Noyon. 18 March - 1 April Employed on working parties in the Noyon region. 1 – 5 April Regrouping towards Roye and Porquericourt; transformation as the 87th Territorial Infantry Division is retitled as the 87th Infantry Division (Active).
