= 36th Army Corps (France) =

36^{er} Corps d'Armée
- Country: France
- Branch: French Army
- Type: Corps
- Engagements: World War I: Second Battle of Ypres; Battle of Passchendaele (Third Battle of Ypres); Battle of the Avre (5 April 1918); Battle of the Lys (1918); The Hundred Days Offensive; Assault on the Hindenburg Line (Battle of St Quentin Canal); Battle of the Canal du Nord; Battle of Mont-d'Origny; Battle of the Sambre (1918) (included the Second Battle of Guise); Meuse–Argonne offensive

The 36th Army Corps (French: 36^{er} Corps d'Armée) was first formed in World War I.

== World War 1 ==
The Corps saw service throughout the entirety of the First World War, including participating in the Battle of Passchendaele as part of the French First Army. At the time of the Battle of Passchendaele, the corps consisted of the 29th Division and the 133rd Division.

=== Composition ===
As per the order of 25 May 1915, the 36th Army Corps was formed on 22 May 1915 with elements of the Détachement d'Armée de Belgique but did not have the organic composition of an army corps until June 1917. Until that time, there was only one General Staff with command over the troops made available.

==== Divisions ====
- 1re Division d'Infanterie from 16 to 29 October 1917
- 2nd Infantry Division (France) from 2 to 16 October 1917
- 15e Division d'Infanterie from 6 October to 2 November 1918
- 17e Division d'Infanterie from 14 to 31 March 1916 and from 4 to 21 April 1918
- 27e Division d'Infanterie from 1 May to 5 June 1918
- 29e Division d'Infanterie from 1 April 1917 to 10 February 1918
- 31e Division d'Infanterie from 5 June 17 August 1918
- 32nd Infantry Division (France) from 5 June 17 August 1918
- 33e Division d'Infanterie from 12 to 15 October 1918
- 34e Division d'Infanterie from 21 April to 4 May and from 20 August to 27 September 1918
- 35e Division d'Infanterie from 20 August to 21 September 1918
- 37th Infantry Division (France) from 10 October 1915 to 6 January 1916
- 38th Infantry Division (France) from 22 May 1915 to 10 May 1916
- 42e Division d'Infanterie from 17 to 20 August 1918
- 45th Infantry Division (France) from 22 May 1915 to 11 March 1916
- 51e Division d'Infanterie from 16 to 31 October 1917
- 58e Division d'Infanterie from 6 January to 28 May 1916
- 64e Division d'Infanterie from 7 October to 7 November 1918
- 65e Division d'Infanterie from 7 to 21 April 1918
- 133e Division d'Infanterie from 16 June 1917 to 7 April 1918, from 30 August to 10 October and from 31 October to 11 November 1918
- 152e Division d'Infanterie from 22 to 27 May 1915 and from 15 October to 10 November 1918
- 153e Division d'Infanterie from 22 May to 8 June 1915 and from 17 to 20 August 1918
- 162e Division d'Infanterie from 15 September to 5 October 1917
- 163e Division d'Infanterie from 30 March to 11 April 1918
- 166e Division d'Infanterie from 21 September to 15 October and from 10 to 11 November 1918
- 168e Division d'Infanterie from 5 May to 5 June 1918
- 81e Division d'Infanterie Territoriale from 22 May to 1 September 1915
- 87e Division d'Infanterie Territoriale from 22 May 1915 to 8 June 1916
- 4e Division de Cavalerie from 30 March to 7 April 1918
- 2e Division de Cavalerie à Pied from 30 March to 5 April 1918

==== Smaller formations ====
Infantry :

- 14e Régiment d'Infanterie Territoriale from March to November 1918
- 79e Régiment d'Infanterie Territoriale from October 1917 to March 1918
- 103e Régiment d'Infanterie Territoriale from June 1917 to January 1918 (dissolution)

Cavalry :

- 4th Squadron of the 2e régiment de Chasseurs d'Afrique (Note: The 2e régiment de chasseurs d'Afrique transferred across from 34e corps d'armée (France)) from July 1917 to November 1918

Artillery :

- 136e batterie de 58T from the 175e Régiment d'Artillerie de Campagne from July to November 1918
- 1 groupe of 105 from the 108e Régiment d'Artillerie Lourde from June 1917 to July 1918 (Note: This groupe de 105 of the 108e Régiment d'Artillerie Lourde transferred to the 136e Régiment d'Artillerie Lourde en July 1918, following a réorganisation.)
- 1 groupe of 105 from the 136e Régiment d'Artillerie Lourde from July to August (Note: This groupe de 105 transferred to the 106e Régiment d'Artillerie Lourde in August 1918.) 1918
- 1 groupe of 120 mm from the 108e Régiment d'Artillerie Lourde from June 1917 to July 1918 (Note: Transformed into a groupe de 105 du 454e Régiment d'Artillerie Lourde in July 1918.)
- 1 groupe of 155 mm from the 136e Régiment d'Artillerie Lourde from July to November 1918 (Note: The groupe of 155 were from the 336e Régiment d'Artillerie Lourde.)

Engineers :

- Compagnie 1/3T of the 3e Régiment du Génie from July 1917 to January 1918
- Compagnie 2/1T of the 3e Régiment du Génie from July 1917 to January 1918
- Compagnie 1/6 of the 3e Régiment du Génie from January to November 1918
- Compagnie 2/5 of the 3e Régiment du Génie from January to November 1918
- Compagnie 15/5T of the 7e Régiment du Génie from July 1917 to November 1918
- Signals Company of the 8e Régiment du Génie from June 1915 to November 1918
