= 37th Infantry Division (France) =

- Country: France
- Branch: French Army
- Type: Infantry
- Size: Division
- Engagements: Battle of Charleroi; Battle of St. Quentin (1914); First Battle of the Marne; Bataille des Deux Morins; Battle of the Aisne; Second Battle of Artois; Second Battle of Champagne; Battle of Verdun; Second Battle of the Aisne; 3e bataille de Picardie

37th Infantry Division was an infantry division of the French Army active during the First World War.

The 37th Division was formed during 1914 from personnel from Algeria, Morocco, and North Africa in general, within the 19th Military Region; The division consisted primarily of tirailleurs and Zouaves (both types of light infantry).

== Commanders ==
- 01/07/1914 : Général Louis Comby
- 09/01/1915 : Général Léon Paul Marie Deshayes de Bonneval
- 26/02/1916 - 29/10/1916 : Général Niessel
- 29/10/1916 - 06/06/1918 : Général Garnier-Duplessix
- 06/06/1918 - 28/03/1919 : Général Simon

== 1914-1918 order of battle ==
=== Overview ===
Mobilised in 19th Military Region, at Arles.

- Régiment de Marche du 2e Tirailleurs from August to September 1914, which became 1er Régiment de Marche de Tirailleurs
- Régiment de Marche du 3e Tirailleurs from August to September 1914, which became 2e Régiment de Marche de Tirailleurs
- Régiment de Marche du 5e Tirailleurs from August to September 1914, which became 1er Régiment de Marche de Tirailleurs
- Régiment de Marche du 6e Tirailleurs from August to September 1914, which became 1er Régiment de Marche de Tirailleurs
- Régiment de Marche du 7e Tirailleurs from August to September 1914, which became 2e Régiment de Marche de Tirailleurs
- 1er Régiment de Marche de Tirailleurs from September 1914 to April 1915, which became 2e Régiment de Tirailleurs de Marche
- 2e Régiment de Tirailleurs de Marche from September 1914 to April 1915, which became 3e Régiment de Tirailleurs de Marche
- 3e Régiment de Tirailleurs de Marche from April 1915 to July 1918
- Régiment de Marche du 2e Zouaves from August 1914 to March 1915, which became 2e Régiment de Zouaves de Marche
- Régiment de Marche du 3e Zouaves from August 1914 to March 1915, which became 3e Régiment de Zouaves de Marche
- 2e Régiment de Zouaves de Marche from March 1915 to November 1918
- 3e Régiment de Zouaves de Marche from March 1915 to November 1918
- 38e Régiment d'Infanterie Territoriale from July 1917 to November 1918

=== Composition ===
==== End of September 1914 ====
73e brigade

- 2e régiment de marche de tirailleurs
- 2e régiment de marche de zouaves

74e brigade

- 3e régiment de marche de tirailleurs
- 3e régiment de marche de zouaves

3e brigade du Maroc

- Régiment de marche de Zouaves
- 2e régiment de marche de Zouaves et Tirailleurs

==== End of April 1915 ====
73e brigade

- 2e régiment de marche de tirailleurs, no change
- 2e régiment de marche de zouaves, no change

74e brigade

- 3e régiment de marche de tirailleurs, no change
- 3e régiment de marche de zouaves, no change

3e brigade du Maroc - on 17 April 1915, transferred out to the 153rd Division.

==== Summer 1918 ====
- 2e régiment de marche de tirailleurs, no change
- 2e régiment de marche de zouaves, no change
- 3e régiment de marche de zouaves, no change
- 3e régiment de marche de tirailleurs - have transferred out

== Timeline ==
=== 1914 ===
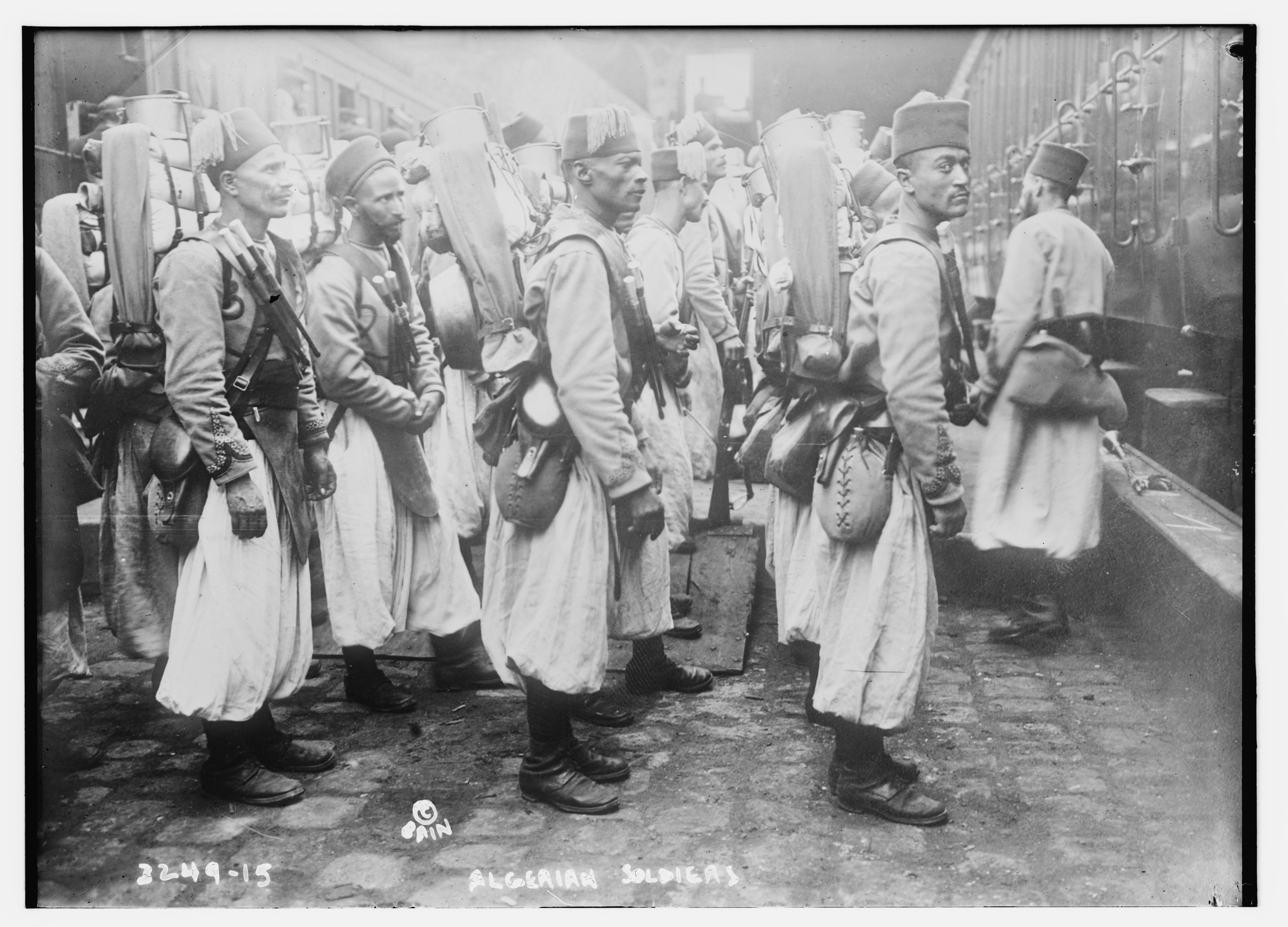
Tirailleurs algériens taking the train in 1914

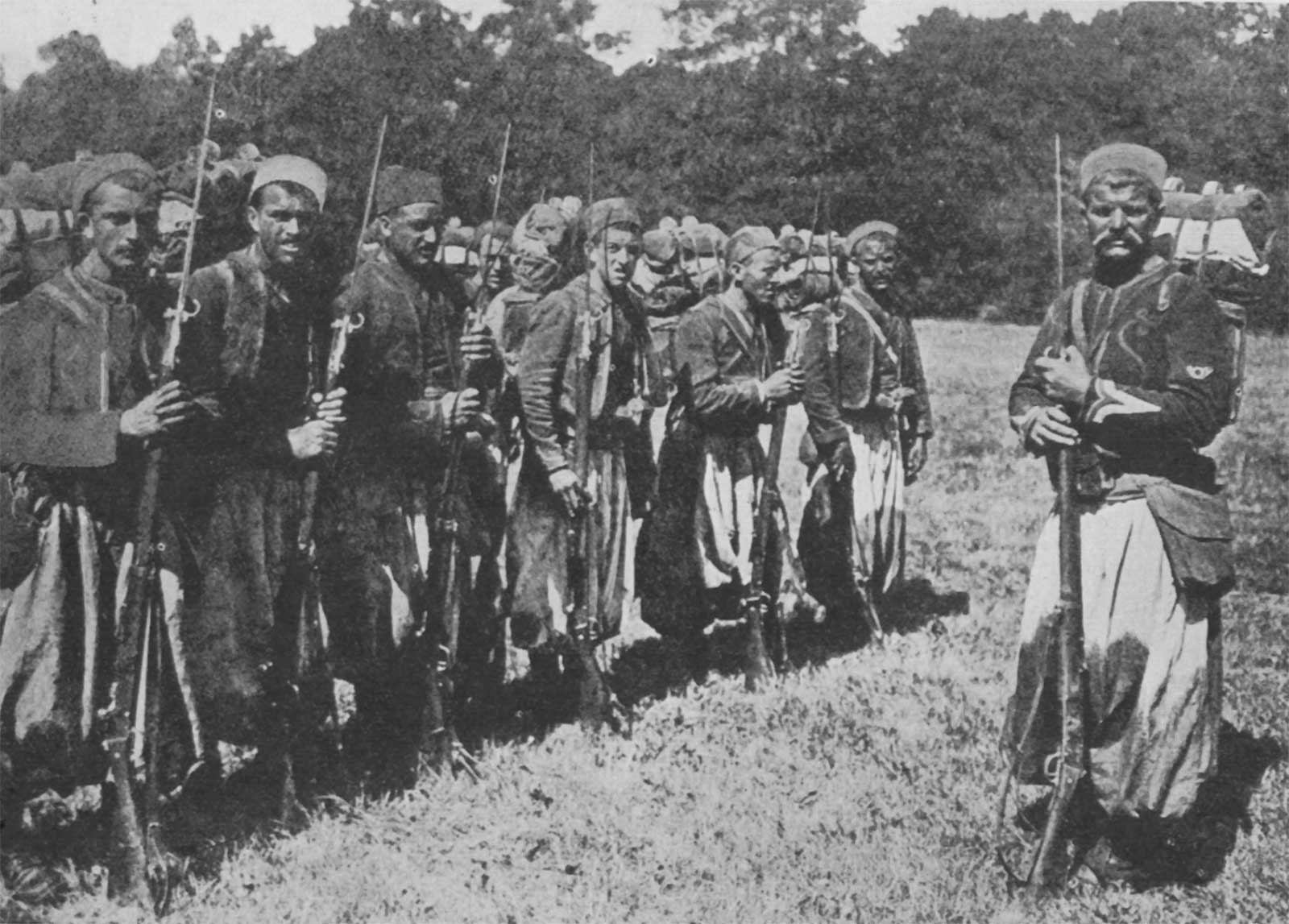
French Zouaves in the First World War

6 – 13 August : Elements of the division which had mobilised in Algeria landed at Sète and Marseille. (Note: 'In August 1914, the 19th région militaire sent three infantry divisions to France - the 37th, the 38th and the 45th') 13–15 August : Transported by rail to the Rocroi region 15–24 August : Moved towards the River Sambre, via Mariembourg and Philippeville. 22 and 23 August: engaged in the Battle of Charleroi: actions at Fosse and Mettet August 24–6 September : retreat towards the south, via Florennes, Hirson, Nampcelles-la-Cour and Lugny. August 29 : engaged in the Battle of St. Quentin (1914) (Battle of Guise), then continued the retreat towards the south, via Laon, Fismes and Verneuil. (Note: The 74th Brigade was at the disposal of the 4th GDR from 31 August to 2 September 1914, thereafter under the orders of the 69th Division for the 3rd day of September) 6 - 15 September : engaged in the First Battle of the Marne. 6 - 9 September : Battle of the Two Morins : fighting towards Courgivaux and on the Petit Morin. From 9 September, transported by rail to Louvres, then movement to Verberie. From 12 September, continued through the Compiègne region. 15 September 1914 - 20 June 1915 : engaged in the First Battle of the Aisne. (Note: The 16th Brigade of the 8th Division, fought with the 37th Division, from 15 to 20 September 1914, towards Cuts and Carlepont . On the 18th, it was at the disposal of the 6th GDR.) Fighting at Cuts, Oise, at Pommeraye and at Lombray. 18 September : slight withdrawal to the Bailly, Oise, Tracy-le-Val position. 20 September : German attack on Tracy-le-Val. (Note: The 3rd Moroccan Brigade is, from 17 September 1914, placed under the orders of the 37th Division, and took part with it in the operations around Tracy-le-Val. This brigade was withdrawn from the front line on 14 April 1915, to enter into the constitution of the 153rd Division. On the 17th and 18th September, the 51st Brigade (within 26th Division) is at the disposal of the 37th. On 17 September, a brigade of Spahis is also made available to the 37th Division.) Then progressive stabilization of the front line in the Oise region, south of the Quennevières farm. 30 - 31 October : French attacks and capture of the Quennevières farm. 12 November : French attacks on the Tracy-le-Val cemetery. 17 November : violent German counter-attacks on Tracy-le-val and the Saint-Mard woods. 21 and 25 December : French attacks to the north-east of the Saint-Mard woods.

=== 1915 ===
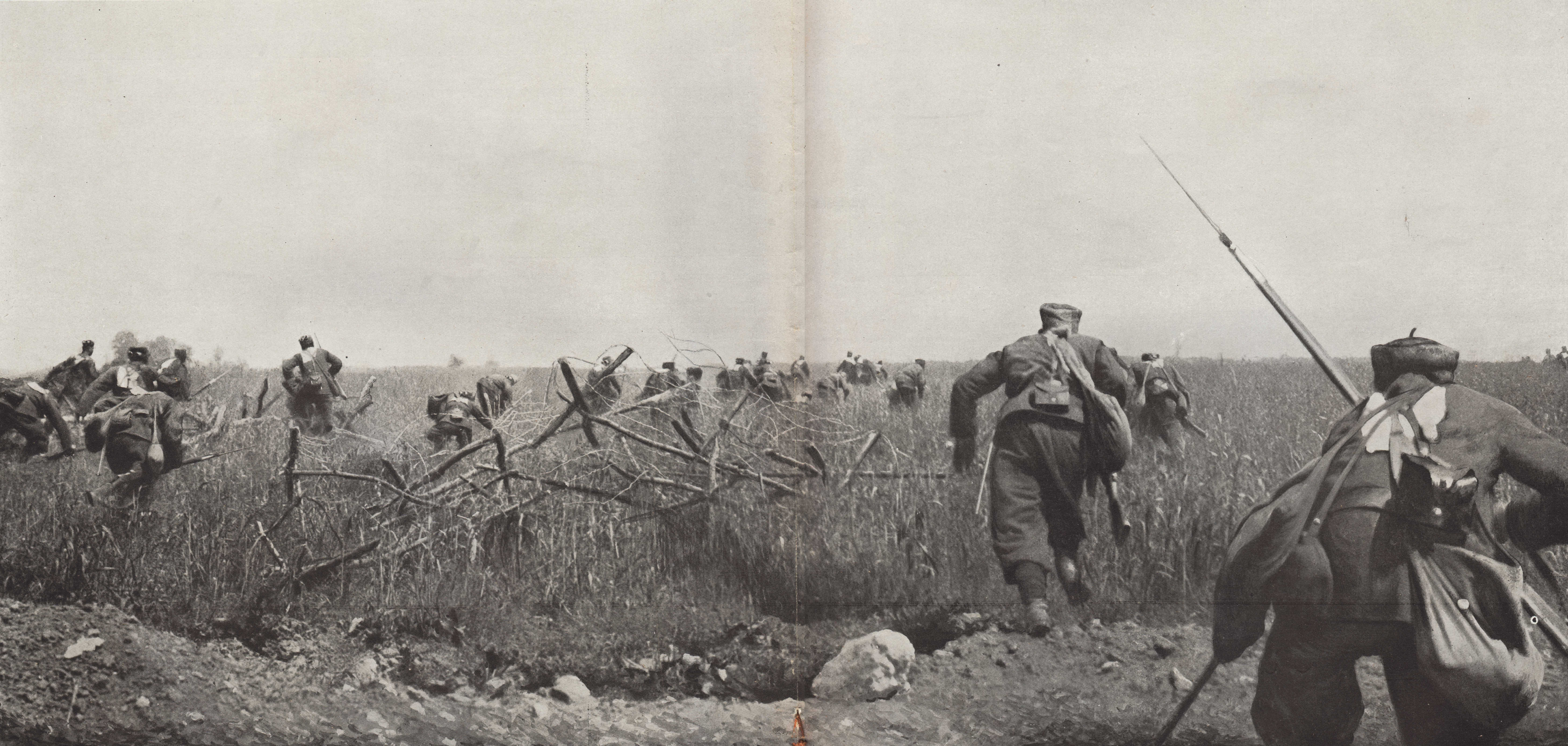
Bayonet charge by the 2e régiment de Zouaves, Plateau of Touvent south of Quennevières, during the Second Battle of Artois.

From March 1915, mine warfare. 6 and 16 June 1915 : elements engaged at the Quennevières farm. June 20–9 July : ring road movement, (Note: From 14 to 27 June 1915, the left part of the sector of the 121st Division (Touvent farm) was held by elements of the 37th and 61st Divisions.) then, from the 28th, occupation of a sector towards the Quennevières farm and Moulin-sous-Touvent. 9 July - 9 August : withdrawn from the front line and movement towards Pierrefonds, Oise: rest and working parties. 9 -August 30 : transported by rail in the Vadenay region, then, from 17 August, working parties around Saint-Hilaire-le-Grand. 30 August - 2 October : occupation of a sector northeast of Saint-Hilaire-le-Grand. Engaged from September 25 to October 6 in the Second battle of Champagne: Fighting towards the Epine de Vedegrange; capture of the 1st German position. 2 October 1915 - 6 January 1916 : withdrawn from the front line and rest towards Vraux. From 9 October, transported by rail, from the Châlons-sur-Marne region, southwest of Bergues; rest and refresher training.

=== 1916 ===
6 January - 12 February : transported by rail to the Bar-le-Duc region, Saint-Dizier: rest. Then transported by rail to the Mailly camp: refresher training. 12 -26 February : transported by rail in the Bar-le-Duc region, then, by trucks, in that of Verdun. Engaged, from 22 February, in the Battle of Verdun, towards Louvemont, the côte de Talou and the côte du Poivre. 26 February - 13 April : withdrawn from the front line and rest towards Rosnes. 8 March : movement towards Neufchâteau: rest. 26 March : movement towards the Saffais camp, refresher training. From the 10 April, transported by rail, in the Vavincourt region . 13 April - 5 July : moved to Vaubécourt. From 16 April, engaged again in the Battle of Verdun, towards Avocourt and the Bois Carré. 5 - 12 July : withdrawn from the front line (elements left in the sector until 10 July); transported by rail in the Stainville region : rest. 12 - 29 July : transported by trucks to Verdun. Engaged for the third time, in the Battle of Verdun, towards the fort of Souville : 15, 16 and 17 July, French attacks on Fleury-devant-Douaumont. 29 July - 12 August 12 : withdrawn from the front line; transported by trucks to Revigny region; rest. 12 August 12–27 September : transported by rail to Frouard and occupation of a sector between Pont-à-Mousson and Armaucourt. 27 September 27–30 October : withdrawn from the front line, and, from the 2 October, transported by rail to Bar-le-Duc: rest. 30 October 30–23 November : movement towards the north; occupation of a sector towards the village and Fort Douaumont. 23 November - 11 December : withdrawn from the front line and rest towards Saint-Dizier. 11 - 20 December : transported by trucks to Verdun. From the 14th, occupied of a sector towards the village and the fort of Douaumont. On 15 December 15, engaged in the 1st Offensive Battle of Verdun: captured the southern edge of the Bois le Chaume and the Bois des Caurières. Then, occupation and organization of the captured positions, towards the Chambrettes farm and Bezonvaux . 20 December 1916 - 7 January 1917 : withdrew from the front line to Wassy to rest.

=== 1917 ===
7 - 28 January : moved to Mailly-le-Camp; then refresher training at the camp. 28 January - 14 February : moved on to Plancy, then on to Méry-sur-Seine, Pleurs and Pierry. February 14–1 April : occupied a sector towards the Cavaliers de Courcy and the eastern outskirts of Reims, (Note: From 16 February to 30 March 1917, a brigade of the 37th Division occupied the Marquises farm sector, east of Reims, under the command of the general commanding the 89th Territorial Division.) reduced on the left, the 13 March, up to Bétheny. 1 - 8 April : withdrew from the front line: moved to Thillois to rest. 8 - 22 April : occupied a sector towards Neuville and the north of Godat. Engaged, from 16 April, in the Second Battle of the Aisne: from the 16th to the 19th, attack on Mount Spin, progression towards the Bois de Séchamp, then, organization of the captured positions. 22 April - 14 May : withdrew from the front; moved to Damery. Then, on 29 April, transported by rail from Epernay to Blainville-sur-l'Eau; to Bayon, rest and refresher training. 14 - 22 May : working parties around Saint-Nicolas-de-Port. 22 May - 8 August : occupied a sector in the Moncel region, Sânon. 8 - 14 August : withdrew from the front line: went to Toul, rest and refresher training. 14 August - 4 September : transported by rail, from the Toul region, to that of Epernay and Dormans; then movement towards Damery and refresher training at the Ville-en-Tardenois camp . 4 September - 1 October : transported by truck to Châlons-sur-Marne; rest. 11 September : moved towards Bar-le-Duc; rest. 1 - 21 October : occupied a sector towards Damloup and the Caurières woods. 21 October - 21 November : withdrew from the front line; to Combles to rest. (Note: From 21 October to 7 November 1917, the 74th Brigade remained in the sector with the 2nd Colonial Army Corps.) 21 November - 6 December : deployed to the front line and occupied a sector towards hill 344 and the Mormont farm: the 25 November, French attack in this region (2nd Offensive Battle of Verdun (battle of Bezonvaux)). 6 - 15 December : withdrew from the front line, transported by rail to Bar-sur-Aube: rest. 15 December 1917 - 28 January 1918 : movement in stages towards Darney; rest. From 22 January 1918, movement in stages towards Nancy, then towards Custines.

=== 1918 ===
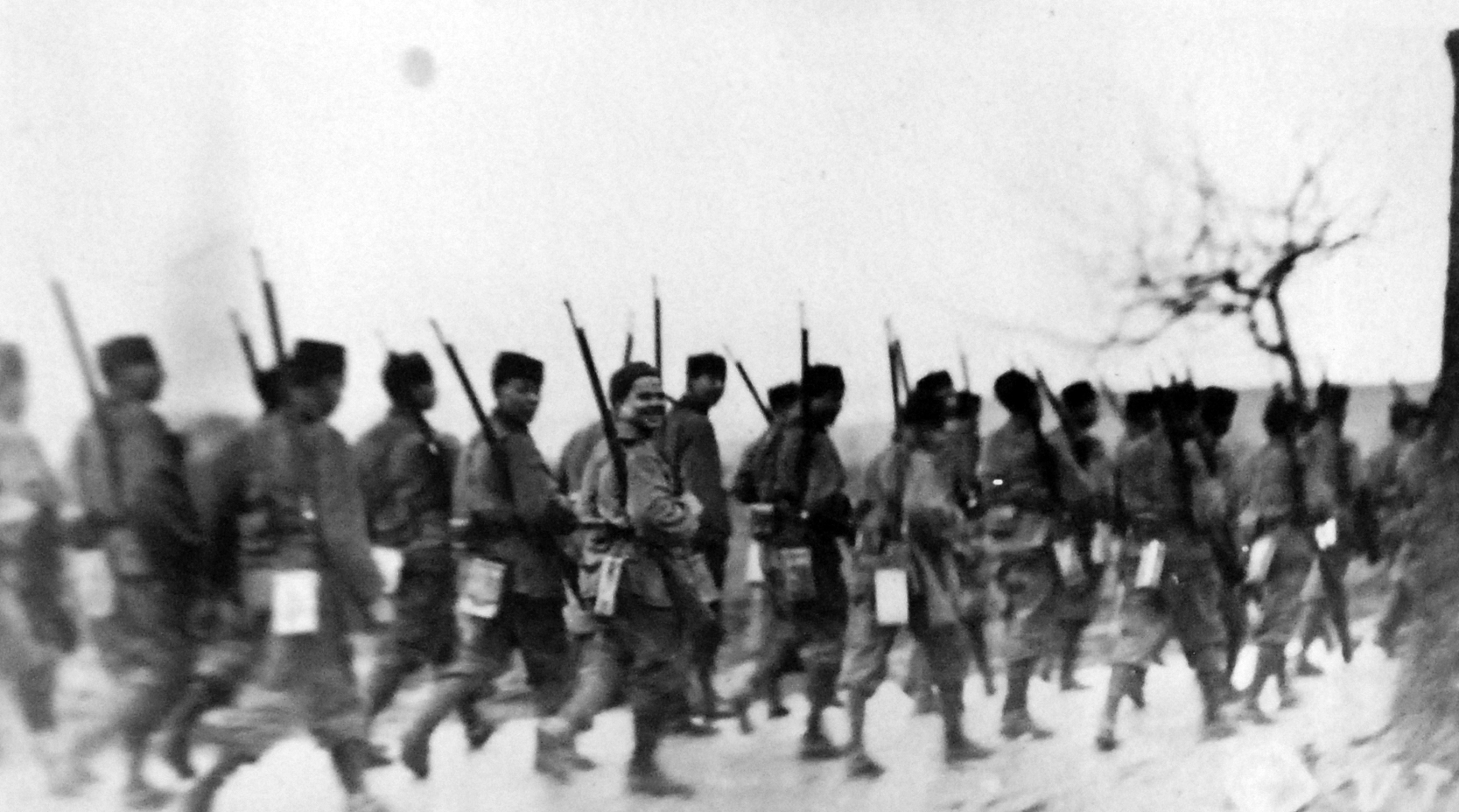
Tirailleurs algériens marching forward to the lines to engage in an attack on La Fère, on the Hindenburg Line, during the Meuse–Argonne offensive in September 1918.

28 January - 2 April : occupied a sector on the Seille, towards Chenicourt and Clémery. 2 - 24 April : withdrew from the front line; moved towards Saint-Nicolas-de-Port and rest. From 11 April, transported by rail to Pont-Sainte-Maxence, then, from 16 April, movement in stages towards Breteuil, Oise and Wailly. 24 April - 2 August : movement towards Bacouel-sur-Selle: in 2nd line, east of Amiens. From 29 April, occupation of a sector towards the Hangard woods (excluded) and Villers-Bretonneux (in connection with the British front), extended to the right, on 30 May, up to Hangard. 2 - 12 August : withdrawal from the front line; rest and refresher training towards Wailly. From 8 August, engaged, towards Hailles and the Sénécat wood, in the third battle of Picardy : progression to the banks of the Avre (Somme) and Andechy. 12 - 27 August : withdrawal from the front line: rest towards Contoire, then towards Maignelay-Montigny. Movement towards the Verberie region, then towards that of Mélicocq. 27 August - 27 September : engaged, towards Noyon, in the pursuit (last part of the 2nd Battle of Noyon). Then organization of a sector in the Oise region, east of Tergnier. 27 September - 23 October : withdrawal from the front line, movement towards Carlepont. Rest towards Chevrières, then Ognes, Oise and Chauny. 23 October - 4 November : movement towards La Fère, and, from 26 October, offensive to the east of Ribemont (Battle of the Serre). Then organization of the captured positions, towards Le Hérie-la-Viéville. 4 - 11 November : engaged in the 2nd Battle of Guise, then in the Meuse–Argonne offensive. Reached, during the armistice, the region of Seloignes, Baileux.

== Chain of Command ==
From	To	Army
13 August 1914	9 September 1914	5th Army (France)
7 August 1915	7 August 1915	6th Army (France)
7 August 1915	9 August 1915	5th Army (France)
9 August 1915	10 October 1915	4th Army (France)
10 October 1915	6 January 1916	GAN (Note: Groupe d'armées du Nord)
6 January 1916	2 February 1916	3rd Army (France)
2 February 1916	12 February 1916	4th Army (France)
12 February 1916	12 February 1916	3rd Army (France)
13 February 1916	26 February 1916	Région Fortifiée de Verdun
26 February 1916	8 March 1916	2nd Army (France)
8 March 1916	26 March 1916	1st Army (France)
10 April 1916	12 August 1916	3rd Army (France)
2 October 1916	7 January 1917	3rd Army (France)
7 January 1917	1 February 1917	4th Army (France)
1 February 1917	29 April 1917	5th Army (France)
29 April 1917	15 August 1917	8th Army (France)
15 August 1917	15 August 1917	5th Army (France)
5 September 1917	11 September 1917	4th Army (France)
11 September 1917	15 December 1917	2nd Army (France)
15 December 1917	11 April 1918	8th Army (France)
11 April 1918	15 April 1918	3rd Army (France)
15 April 1918	24 August 1918	1st Army (France)
24 August 1918	14 September 1918	3rd Army (France)
14 September 1918	11 November 1918	1st Army (France)
