= Canton of Senlis =

Canton of France

Coordinates: 49.21°N 2.58°E

- Canton
- Situation of the canton of Senlis in the department of Oise
- Country: France
- Region: Hauts-de-France
- Department: Oise
- No. of communes: {{{nbcomm}}}
- Population (2023): 33,188
- INSEE code: 6020

The canton of Senlis is an administrative division of the Oise department, northern France. Its borders were modified at the French canton reorganisation which came into effect in March 2015. Its seat is in Senlis.

It consists of the following communes:

1. Aumont-en-Halatte
2. Avilly-Saint-Léonard
3. Chamant
4. La Chapelle-en-Serval
5. Courteuil
6. Fleurines
7. Mont-l'Évêque
8. Mortefontaine
9. Orry-la-Ville
10. Plailly
11. Pontarmé
12. Senlis
13. Thiers-sur-Thève
14. Vineuil-Saint-Firmin
