= Courteuil =

- Commune
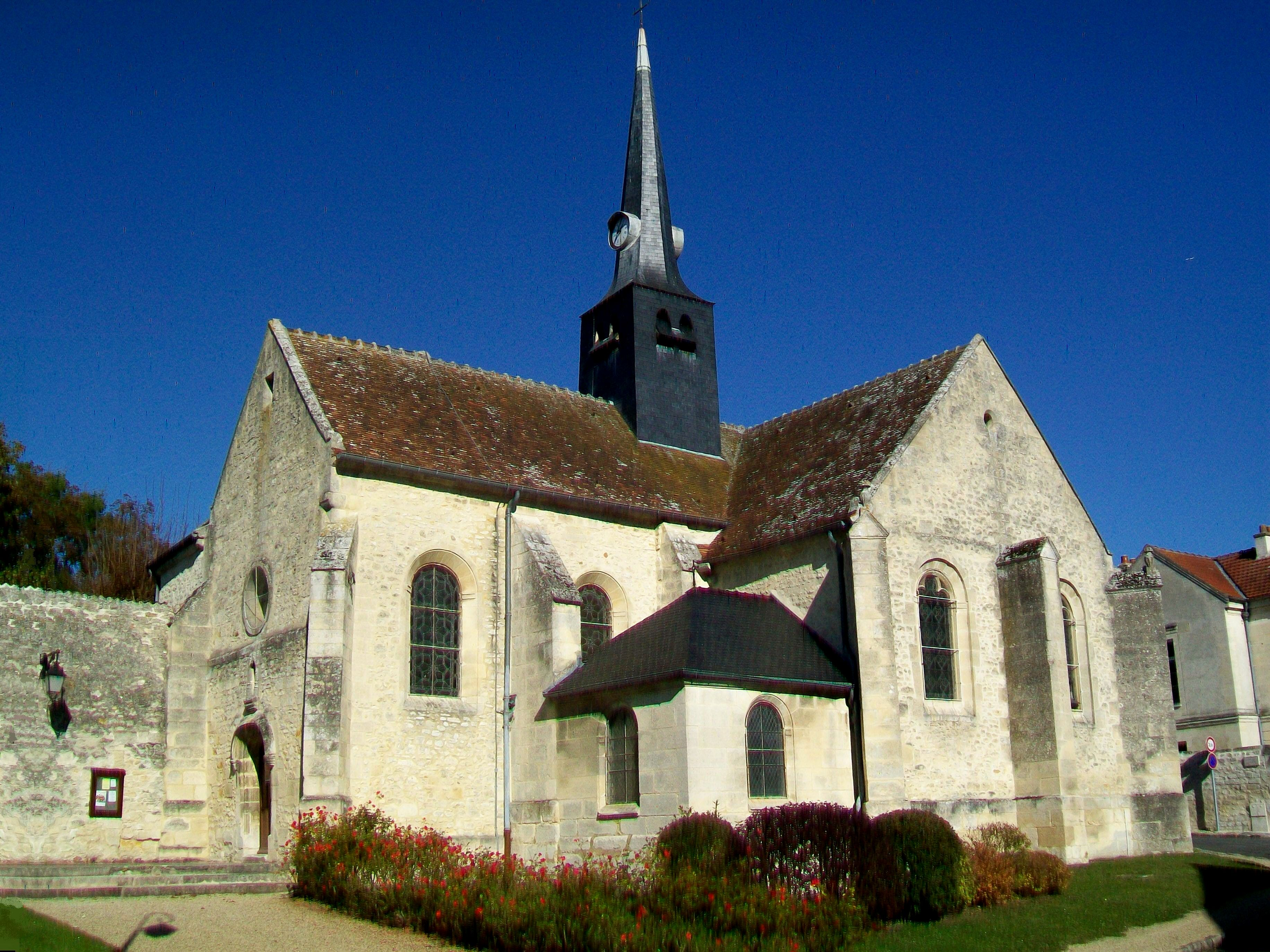
- The church in Courteuil
- Location of Courteuil
- Location within France Location within Hauts-de-France
- Coordinates: 49°11′59″N 2°32′09″E
- Country: France
- Region: Hauts-de-France
- Department: Oise
- Arrondissement: Senlis
- Canton: Senlis

Government
  - Mayor (2020–2026): François Dumoulin
- Area^{1}: 5.32 km^{2} (2.05 sq mi)
- Elevation: 63 m (207 ft)
- Highest elevation: 84 m (276 ft)
- Lowest elevation: 42 m (138 ft)
- Population (2023): 581
  - Density: 109/km^{2} (283/sq mi)
- Time zone: UTC+01:00 (CET)
  - Summer (DST): UTC+02:00 (CEST)
- INSEE/Postal code: 60170 /60300
- ^{1} French Land Register data, which excludes lakes, ponds, glaciers > 1 km^{2} (0.386 sq mi or 247 acres) and river estuaries.

Courteuil (French pronunciation: [kuʁtœj]) is a commune in the Oise department in northern France.

== See also ==
- Communes of the Oise department
