= 38th Infantry Division (France) =

- Country: France
- Branch: French Army
- Type: Infantry
- Size: Division
- Engagements: Battle of Charleroi; Battle of St. Quentin (1914); First Battle of the Marne; Bataille des Deux Morins; First Battle of the Aisne; Battle of the Yser; Battle of Verdun; Second Battle of the Aisne; Battle of La Malmaison; 2e bataille de Picardie Operation Michael; Third Battle of the Aisne; Second Battle of the Marne

38th Infantry Division was an infantry division of the French Army active during the First World War.

The 38th Division was formed in August 1914 from personnel from North Africa within the 19th Military Region; The division consisted primarily of tirailleurs and Zouaves (both types of light infantry).

Of particular note is that the 4e brigade marocaine was a part of the Division for a large part of WW1. It was formed around two infantry regiments. The Régiment d'infanterie coloniale du Maroc is the most decorated unit of the French Army. Not to be outdone, the 4e régiment mixte de zouaves et tirailleurs (4e RMZT) gained a reputation as an elite formation, too. It distinguished itself during the First World War, notably during the recapture of Fort Douaumont on 24 October 1916 and the battle of La Malmaison on 23 October 1917. The unit was cited six times in the orders of the Army during the war, and consequently received the red Fourragère on 9 November 1918. Its flag was decorated with the Légion d'honneur on 13 July 1919.

The Division is noted for its role in the first and second offensive stages of the fighting at Verdun during October and December 1916. It captured the Fort de la Malmaison during the battle of the same name on 23 October 1917.

== Commanders ==
- 2 August - 11 November 1914 : Général Muteau
- 12 November 1914 - 13 January 1915 : Général de Bazelaire
- 13 January - 21 May 1915 : Général Hély d'Oissel
- 21 May 1915 - 22 April 1916 : Général Rouquerol
- 22 April 1916 - 16 October 1918 : Général Arthur Guyot de Salins
- 16 October 1918 - 12 April 1919 : Général Dufieux

== Chain of Command ==
From	To	Army
13 August 1914	27 October 1914	5th Army (France)
27 October 1914	16 November 1914	DAB (Note: Détachement d'armée de Belgique)
16 November 1914	31 December 1914	8th Army (France)
31 December 1914	17 January 1915	2nd Army (France)
17 January 1915	7 April 1915	GPN (Note: Groupe Provisoire du Nord)
7 April 1915	22 May 1915	DAB
22 May 1915	13 June 1915	GPN
13 June 1915	10 May 1916	GAN (Note: Groupe d'armées du Nord)
10 May 1916	25 May 1916	6th Army (France)
25 May 1916	22 January 1917	2nd Army (France)
22 January 1917	24 January 1917	4th Army (France)
24 January 1917	3 February 1917	5th Army (France)
3 February 1917	29 July 1917	6th Army (France)
29 July 1917	20 August 1917	3rd Army (France)
20 August 1917	6 November 1917	6th Army (France)
6 November 1917	12 December 1917	5th Army (France)
12 December 1917	9 February 1918	4th Army (France)
9 February 1918	20 March 1918	5th Army (France)
20 March 1918	27 March 1918	6th Army (France)
27 March 1918	12 April 1918	3rd Army (France)
12 April 1918	2 May 1918	4th Army (France)
2 May 1918	7 May 1918	6th Army (France)
7 May 1918	11 June 1918	3rd Army (France)
11 June 1918	2 August 1918	10th Army (France)
2 August 1918	11 August 1918	3rd Army (France)
11 August 1918	30 August 1918	10th Army (France)
30 August 1918	16 September 1918	3rd Army (France)
16 September 1918	11 November 1918	7th Army (France)

== Composition ==
=== 1914 ===
August 1914

- 75e brigade

1er régiment de marche de zouaves
1er Régiment de Marche de Tirailleurs

- 76e brigade

4e régiment de marche de zouaves
4e régiment de marche de tirailleurs tunisiens
8e régiment de marche de tirailleurs tunisiens

=== 1915 ===
End of July 1915

- 75e brigade - has transferred out to the 25th Division
- Brigade de Fusiliers Marins- replaced the 75e, with the Division until its disbandment
- 76e brigade

1er régiment de marche de zouaves, no change
4e régiment de marche de zouaves, no change
8e régiment de marche de tirailleurs tunisiens, no change

=== 1916 ===
As of 1 January 1916

- 76e brigade

4e régiment de marche de zouaves, no change
8e régiment de marche de tirailleurs tunisiens, no change

- 4e brigade marocaine - attached since November 1915

4e régiment mixte de zouaves et tirailleurs
Régiment d'infanterie coloniale du Maroc (RICM)

=== 1918 ===
End of September 1918

- 4e régiment de marche de zouaves, no change
- 4e régiment mixte de zouaves et tirailleurs, no change
- 10e groupe, comprising 49e, 65e & 69e bataillons de chasseurs à pied, to replace the 8e RMTZ
- RICM transferred out to the newly-formed 2nd Moroccan Division in August 1918, no replacement formation to take their place.

== Chronology ==
=== 1914 ===
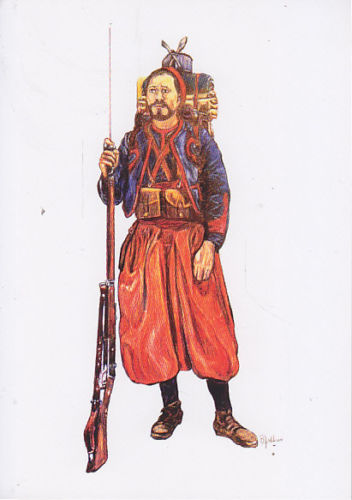
Zouave uniform for the early part of WW1

2 August 1914 : mobilized partly in Algeria, partly in France. (Note: 'In August 1914, the 19th région militaire sent three infantry divisions to France - the 37th, the 38th and the 45th') 4 – 18 August : transported by sea and then by rail; all units were concentrated in the Chimay region. 18 – 24 August : moved, via Froidchapelle and Walcourt, towards the Sambre. 22 August 22 : engaged in the Battle of Charleroi : fighting towards Châtelet and Somzée. 24 August – 6 September : retreated, via Sains-Richaumont, towards the Chevresis-Monceau region. 29 August : engaged in the Battle of Guise : fighting, towards Ribemont and Villers-le-Sec, Meuse. From 30 August, retreated, via Chavonne, Trélou-sur-Marne and Montmirail, Marne, to the north of Provins. 6 – 14 September : engaged in the First Battle of the Marne. 6 – 19 September : Battle of the Two Morins (in the 2nd line from the 6th to the 8th, then in the 1st line on the 9th). From 10 September, continued via Château-Thierry and Fismes, up to the Chemin des Dames, north of Paissy. 14 September – 26 October : engaged in the First Battle of the Aisne (in liaison with the British army): fighting towards the Hurtebise and Creute farms; stabilization of the front and occupied a sector towards the Hurtebise farm and the road from Paissy to Ailles. 12 October : French attacks towards the Creute farm.

26 – 29 October : withdrew from the front line; transported by rail, from the Fismes region to that of Calais, then transported by trucks to that of Furnes, Belgium. 29 October – 9 December : moved to the front line. Engaged in the Battle of the Yser: repeated violent fighting towards Luyghem, Poesele, Bikschote and the Passeur house; then stabilisation of the front, and occupied of a sector on the Yser, towards the Knokke bridge and the Passeur house. From 4 December, French attacks on the Passeur's house. 9 – 25 December : moved (in parallel with the front - fr:Rocade (militaire)) and occupied a new sector towards Verbranden-Molen and the castle 1 km west of Hollebeke. 14 December : French attacks.

=== 1915 ===
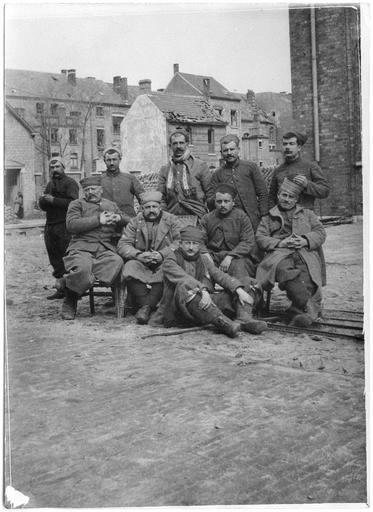
A group of Zouaves photographed at Nieuwpoort in April 1915. Their khaki battledress is less ornate than the parade dress worn at the start of the war.

25 December 1914 – 2 February 1915 : withdrew from the front line and moved in stages to the Cassel, Nord region. 31 December : transported by rail to the southwest of Montdidier, Somme: rest and refresher training. 17 January : transported by rail to Dunkirk region; rest in the Hondschoote region. 31 January : moved to Coxyde (Koksijde). 2 February 1915 – 20 April 1916 : moved to the front line and occupied a sector towards Nieuwpoort, Belgium. 23 April - 6 May : elements engaged towards Steenstrate and Lizerne . 9 May : German attack at Nieuwpoort.

=== 1916 ===
20 April – 30 May : withdrew from the front line to Bergues; rest and refresher training. 10 May : transported by truck to the training camp at Crèvecœur-le-Grand;refresher training. 25 May : transported by rail to Laheycourt, then moved to Vaubecourt: rest. 30 May – 22 June : moved towards the front line. 12 June : engaged in the Battle of Verdun, towards Hill 304 and the eastern edge of the Avocourt woods. 22 June – 12 July : withdrew from the front line; rest in the Fleury-sur-Aire, Jubécourt region. 12 – 27 July : moved to the front line, engaged again in the Battle of Verdun; occupied a sector towards Hill 304 and the eastern edge of the Avocourt wood. 27 July – 3 August : withdrew from the front line to Revigny; rest. 3 – 21 August : moved to the front line, occupied a sector towards the Thiaumont fortification and the Vaux wood: fighting from the 17th to the 21st August (Battle of Verdun). 21 August – 21 October : withdrew from the front line; rest and refresher training at the Tannois camp . 21 – 31 October : transported by trucks to Verdun . From the 23rd, occupied a sector towards the Haudromont woods and the Thiaumont fortification. 24 October : engaged in the 1st Verdun Offensive : capture of Fort Douaumont, then occupation and organisation of the captured positions towards the Bois d'Haudromont and Fort Douaumont. 31 October – 10 December : withdrew from the front; rest in the Tannois, Stainville region. 10 – 20 December : transported by trucks to Verdun. 14 December : occupied a sector towards the Haudromont woods and the village of Douaumont (excluded) 15 December : engaged again in the 1st Verdun Offensive: capture of Louvemont; on the 18th, capture of the Chambrettes farm; then occupation and organisation of the captured positions. 20 December 1916 – 16 January 1917 : withdrew from the front line to the Ligny-en-Barrois, Gondrecourt-le-Château region; rest and refresher training.

=== 1917 ===
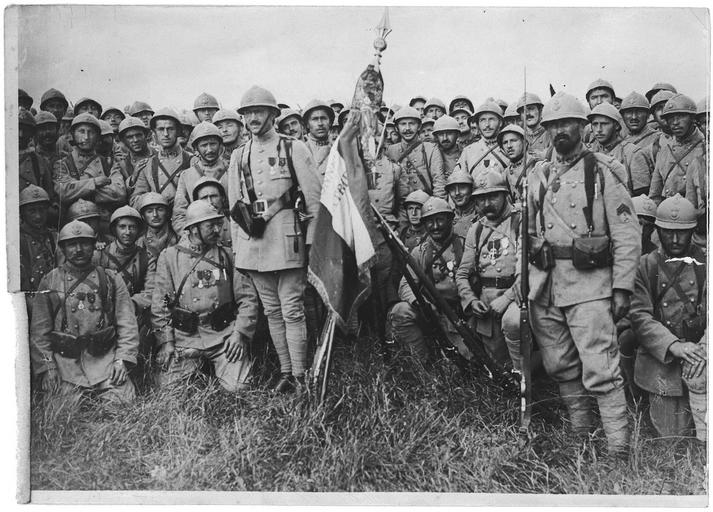
The flag of the Régiment d'infanterie colonial du Maroc, surrounded by marsouins from the unit. Taken on 1 August 1917 at Candor, Oise, France.

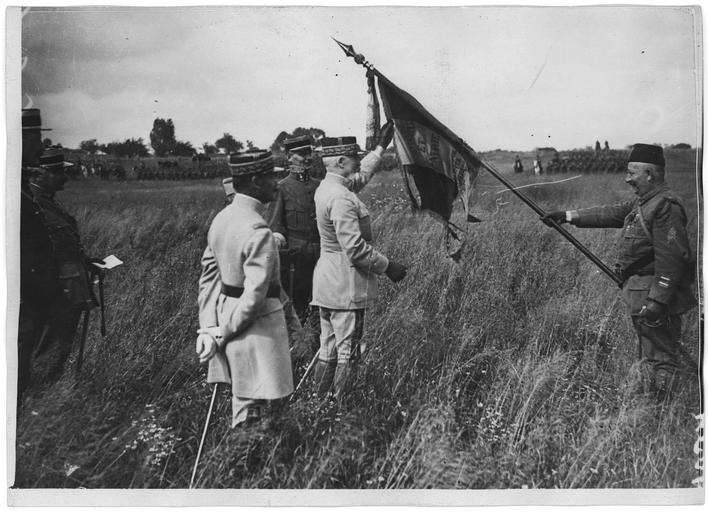
General Pétain decorates the flag of the 4e régiment mixte de zouaves et de tirailleurs. Taken on 17 August 1917 at Candor, Oise, France.

16 January – 15 April : moved, via Mailly-le-Camp and Montmirail, Marne, to Nogent-l'Artaud; rest and refresher training. 27 March : moved in stages towards Château-Thierry, then Coulonges and Bazoches. 2 - 14 April : elements in the sector towards the Chemin des Dames . 15 – 29 April : took up a position north of the Aisne (river), towards Jumigny. From 16 April : engaged in the Second Battle of the Aisne: capture of enemy positions south of Chermizy-Ailles; then organisation of the captured terrain towards the Hurtebise farm (near Craonne) and the road from Paissy to Ailles. 25 April : violent German attack and French counter-attack. 29 April – 7 July : withdrew from the front line to Fismes (elements in sector at Chemin des Dames); rest and refresher training. 7 July – 20 August : grouping in the Belleau, Aisne region and from 29 July, transported by truck to the Lassigny camp; rest and refresher training. 20 August – 18 September : transported by trucks to Vailly-sur-Aisne; then occupied a sector towards the Pantheon and the north of the Colombe farm. 18 September – 20 October : withdrew from the front line to Ecury; rest and refresher training. 20 – 31 October : occupied a sector between the north of the Colombe farm and the west of the Pantheon. From 23 October, engaged in the Battle of La Malmaison: attack and capture of the fort of Malmaison, then organisation of the captured positions towards Pargny-Filain and Chavignon. 31 October – 12 December : withdrew from the front line; transported by trucks to Crézancy, then moved in stages to Avize and Vertus; rest and refresher training. 12 December 1917 – 1 February 1918 : moved towards Tours-sur-Marne and Mourmelon-le-Grand; employed on working parties.

=== 1918 ===
1 February – 25 March : moved to the Vertus region; rest and refresher training (elements maintained at 2nd position on working parties until 9 February). 25 February - 25 March : moved to the Damery, Marne region; rest and refresher training. 25 March –April 3 : moved to Mareuil-le-Port; on the 26th, transported by truck to Ressons-sur-Matz. From 27 March : engaged in the 2nd battle of Picardy during Operation Michael. 28, 29 and 31 March : resistance to the German offensive towards Orvillers-Sorel. 3 April – 8 May : withdrew from the front line to Gournay-sur-Aronde; rest and working parties. 10 April : grouping between Pont-Sainte-Maxence and Estrées-Saint-Denis. 12 April : transported by truck to Tours-sur-Marne and Aÿ; rest and refresher training. 1 May : moved in stages towards Tracy-le-Mont and Offémont. 8 May – June 11 : occupied a sector towards Sempigny and Varesnes. Engaged in the Third Battle of the Aisne, retreated to Mont de Choisy, situated to the north east of Caisnes. 30 May and 5 June : violent German attacks towards Mont de Choisy. 11 June – 14 July : withdrew, then occupied and defended a sector towards Tracy-le-Val and Bailly. 14 – 23 July : ring road moved, and, from the 15th, occupied a sector towards the Chavigny farm and Saint-Pierre-Aigle. From 18 July, engaged, towards Longpont and the Chavigny farm, in the Second Battle of the Marne (Battle of Soissons (1918)): combats of Longpont and Tigny, progression to Hartennes. Undertook the attacks on 18 and 19 July in concert with the 2nd Infantry Division (United States). 23 July – 4 August : withdrew from the front line, its positions were relieved by the 34th Division (United Kingdom). Regrouped at Vez, Oise, then moved towards Cuise-la-Motte and Trosly-Breuil; rest. 4 August – 6 September : occupied a sector towards Bailly, Oise and the Saint-Mard woods. 19 - 29 August : engaged in the Carlepont region to the north of the Oise river, between Noyon and Pontoise-lès-Noyon. 29 August - 6 September : organisation of the positions conquered in this region. 6 – 15 September : withdrew from the front line, moved to Chevrières, Oise; rest and refresher training.

15 September – 2 November : transported by rail to Montbéliard. From 22 September, occupied a sector in Oberelsaß (Haut Alsace), between Fulleren and Burnhaupt-le-Bas, moved to the right, 12 October, between Fulleren and the Swiss border. 2 – 11 November : moved to Héricourt, Haute-Saône, then, from the 5th, to Épinal, via Ronchamp, Luxeuil-les-Bains, Plombières-les-Bains, Remiremont and Arches, Vosges.
