= 19th Army Corps (France) =

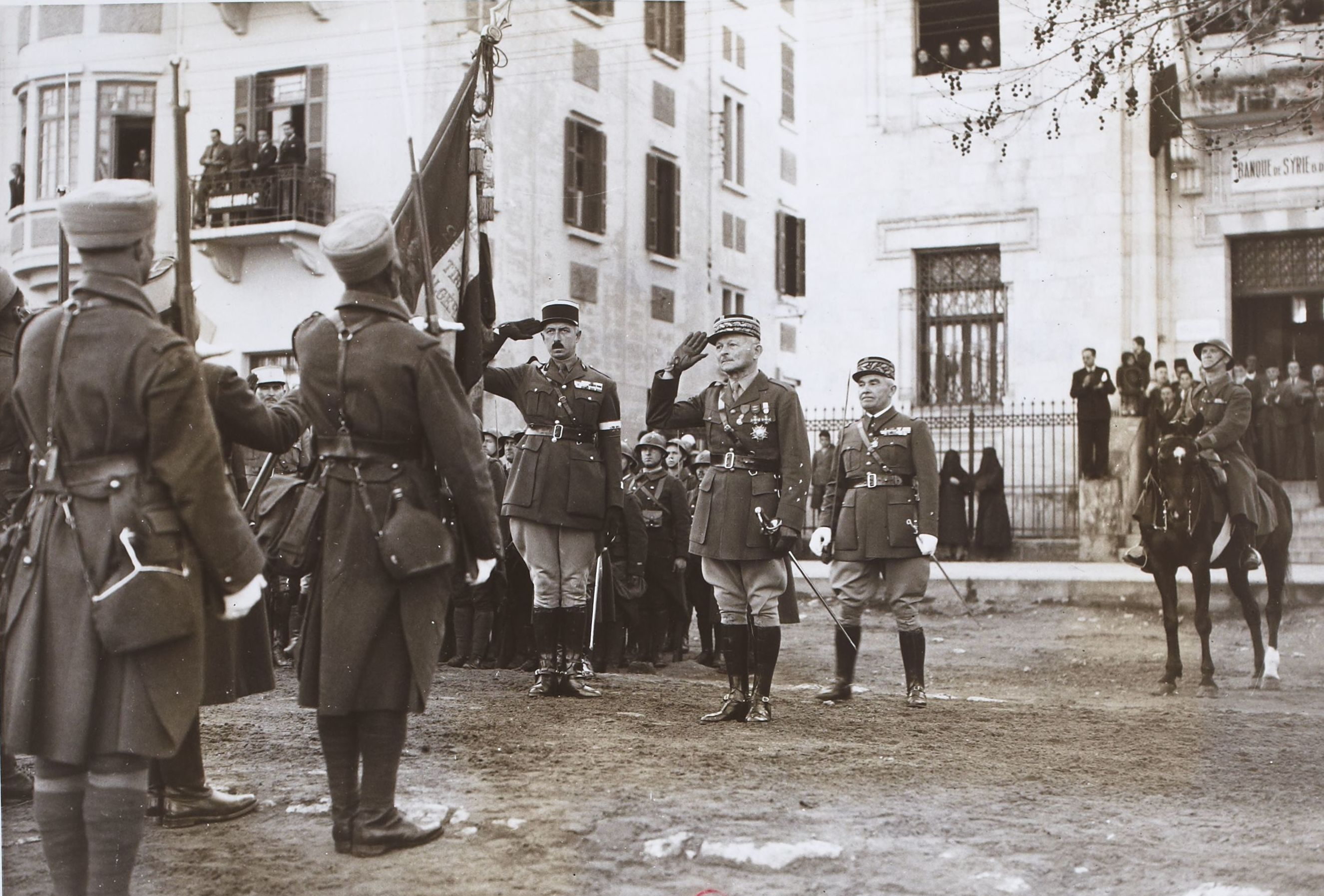

The 19th Army Corps (19e Corps d'Armée) was a corps of the French army. In December 1870, the Tours delegation created the 19th Army Corps which was formed in Alençon. It was recreated by decree of the JO of August 13, 1874, it brought together the various military units of Algeria. It constituted the nucleus of the Army of Africa.

The corps appears to have been disbanded and superseded by the 10th Military Region by a decree of 18 February 1946.

== 19th Military Region ==
The Army Corps was located in the 19th Military Region of the Metropolitan Army which included the three départements of Algiers, Oran and Constantine, situated in modern day Algeria. The garrisons were principally based in Algiers, Mascara, Tlemcen, and Ain. Elements were also in Tunisia, forming the 'Tunisian occupation division', located mainly in Tunis, Bizerte and Sousse. The other twenty military regions of the Metropolitan army covered mainland France, hence the distinction this was the 'Army of Africa'.

== Franco-Prussian War ==
The Twenty-one army corps were established in December 1870, each with its own military region. The 19th Army Corps was stood down on 13 March 1871.

== From 1870 to 1914 ==
The corps' Oran and Algiers divisions fought the -'Aït Khabbash', a fraction of the Aït Ounbgui khams of the Aït Atta confederation in the late 1890s. The conflict ended by the annexation of the Touat-Gourara-Tidikelt complex by France in 1901.

== First World War ==
At the outbreak of war, enough men to create three infantry divisions (37th, 38th, 45th) were sent to mainland France.

The Moroccan Division was one of the most decorated units of the French Army in World War I and all its regiments were distinguished by unit citations mentioned in despatches of the armed forces at the end of the conflict. The Moroccan Division was the only division to receive the battle honour of being decorated with the légion d'honneur throughout the course of World War I.

The following troops were detached from the 19th Army Corps to serve in the Corps expéditionnaire d'Orient. Two provisional regiments (1er, 2e régiment de marche d'Afrique) comprising a total of five Zouave battalions and one Foreign Legion battalion, were created. They saw action in the Gallipoli campaign, and thereafter on the Salonika front, fighting alongside British troops in both theatres of war.

Two battalions of Tirailleurs algériens were to see action in the middle east as part of the Détachement Français de Palestine et de Syrie that were deployed by France.

== Second World War ==
The 85th African Infantry Division (85e DIA) was a Formation-A-Class reserve mountain division mobilized 2 September 1939 in Algiers. The 85th DIA occupied covering positions along the Libyan border until the end of May 1940 and was then shipped to Marseille by 3 June 1940.

On 10 May 1940, the corps comprised the 85e DIA; the 181st African Infantry Division; the 182nd African Infantry Division; the 183rd African Infantry Division; the East Saharan Front of division size; an armoured battalion, an infantry battalion (21e Bataillon d'Infanterie Légère d'Afrique, of the Battalions of Light Infantry of Africa), and a cavalry regiment.

The Oran, Constantine, and Algiers Divisions existed on 8 November 1942 as Operation Torch began; the corps was commanded by Lieutenant General fr:Louis Koeltz while the Algiers Division was under Charles Mast.

The corps joined the Allies in late 1942 when Vichy French forces in north-west Africa went over to the Allies after 'Torch' and Hitler ordered 'Case Anton,' the German and Italian occupation of Vichy France.

The Corps order of battle in 1942 (as far as known) during this time was:

- Division de marche d'Alger
  - 1er régiment de Tirailleurs algériens (Algerian native infantry regiment)
  - 9e régiment de tirailleurs algériens (Algerian native infantry regiment)
  - 3e régiment de Zouaves (north African European infantry regiment)
  - 2e régiment de Chasseurs d'Afrique (north African European cavalry regiment)
  - 1er régiment de spahis algériens (Algerian native cavalry regiment)
  - 65e régiment d'artillerie d'Afrique (north African artillery regiment)
  - 410e régiment d'artillerie de défense contre aéronef (anti-aircraft artillery regiment)
- Division de Marche d'Oran
  - 2e régiment de tirailleurs algériens (Algerian native infantry regiment)
  - 6e régiment de tirailleurs algériens (Algerian native infantry regiment)
  - 15e régiment de tirailleurs sénégalais (African native infantry regiment)
  - 1st Foreign Infantry Regiment (French Foreign Legion)
  - 1st et 3rd Batteries, 62e Regiment d'Artillerie Africaine (RAA), 2e 66e RAA, 1er 68e RAA.
  - Batteries A/C 47mm (2 ? 3? Š)
  - 411e régiment d'artillerie de défense contre aéronef (anti-aircraft artillery regiment)
- Division de Marche du Maroc :

As of 27 December 1942 :

  - 7e régiment de tirailleurs marocains (Moroccan native infantry regiment)
  - 3e régiment de tirailleurs marocains (Moroccan native infantry regiment)
  - 4e régiment de tirailleurs tunisiens (Tunisian native infantry regiment)
  - 3e régiment étranger d'infanterie (foreign legion infantry regiment)
  - 1er Groupe de tabors marocains (Moroccan native infantry regiment)
  - 1st Foreign Cavalry Regiment (1er régiment étranger de cavalerie) (2 escadrons ? 1 groupe ?) (Foreign Legion)
  - 2 groupes de 75
  - 1 battery of 47mm
  - 1 squadron of armoured cars (GB)
  - 1 company of light tanks (US)

NB sont mentionnés : mountain artillery reinforcements (2 ou 3 ou 4 batteries ?)

The 19th Army Corps fought as an Allied formation within the British 1st Army until the surrender of Axis forces in Tunisia.

== Postwar changeover to 10th Military Region ==
General fr:Henry Martin (général) appears to have been the last commander of the 19th Army Corps (1944–46) and the first commander of the successor 10th Military Region, formed in accordance with the decree of 18 February 1946. .

== Corps commanders 1920 – 1946 ==
- 5 March 1920 – 30 September 1920: Général Henri Albert Niessel
- 9 November 1920 – 26 September 1923: Genéral Marie Jean Auguste Paulinier
- 4 October 1923: General Edmond Just Victor Boichut
- 24 December 1925: General Stanislas Naulin
- 23 November 1930 : General Georges
- 20 March 1933: General Charles Noguès
- 16 September 1936 : General Catroux
- 29 January 1939 – 20 August 1940 : General Poupinel
- August 1940 – September 1941 : General Paul Beynet
- 15 September 1941 – 10 May 1944 : General Koeltz
- 30 August 1944 – 27 June 1945 : General Martin
