= Aumont-en-Halatte =

- Commune
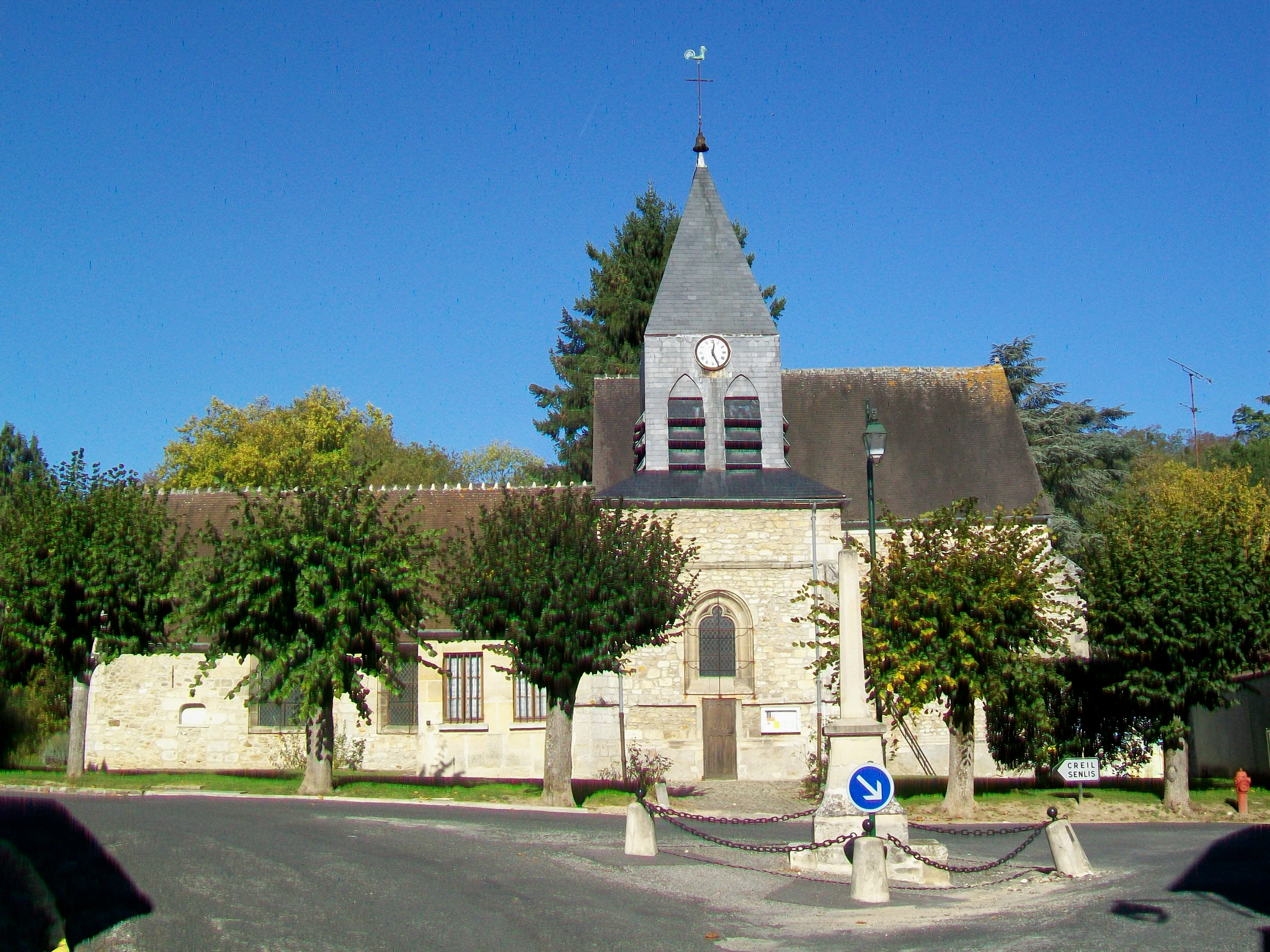
- The church in Aumont-en-Halatte
- Location of Aumont-en-Halatte
- Location within France Location within Hauts-de-France
- Coordinates: 49°13′48″N 2°33′10″E
- Country: France
- Region: Hauts-de-France
- Department: Oise
- Arrondissement: Senlis
- Canton: Senlis
- Intercommunality: CC Senlis Sud Oise

Government
  - Mayor (2020–2026): Christel Jaunet
- Area^{1}: 6.83 km^{2} (2.64 sq mi)
- Elevation: 99 m (325 ft)
- Highest elevation: 143 m (469 ft)
- Lowest elevation: 65 m (213 ft)
- Population (2023): 567
  - Density: 83.0/km^{2} (215/sq mi)
- Time zone: UTC+01:00 (CET)
  - Summer (DST): UTC+02:00 (CEST)
- INSEE/Postal code: 60028 /60300
- ^{1} French Land Register data, which excludes lakes, ponds, glaciers > 1 km^{2} (0.386 sq mi or 247 acres) and river estuaries.

Aumont-en-Halatte (French pronunciation: [omɔ̃ ɑ̃.n‿alat], literally Aumont in Halatte) is a commune in the Oise department in northern France.

== Population ==
Historical population
Year	Pop.	±% p.a.
1968	310	—
1975	353	+1.87%
1982	422	+2.58%
1990	544	+3.23%
1999	482	−1.34%
2007	554	+1.76%
2012	541	−0.47%
2017	476	−2.53%
2023	567	+2.96%
Source: INSEE

== See also ==
- Communes of the Oise department
