= Moncel-lès-Lunéville =

- Commune
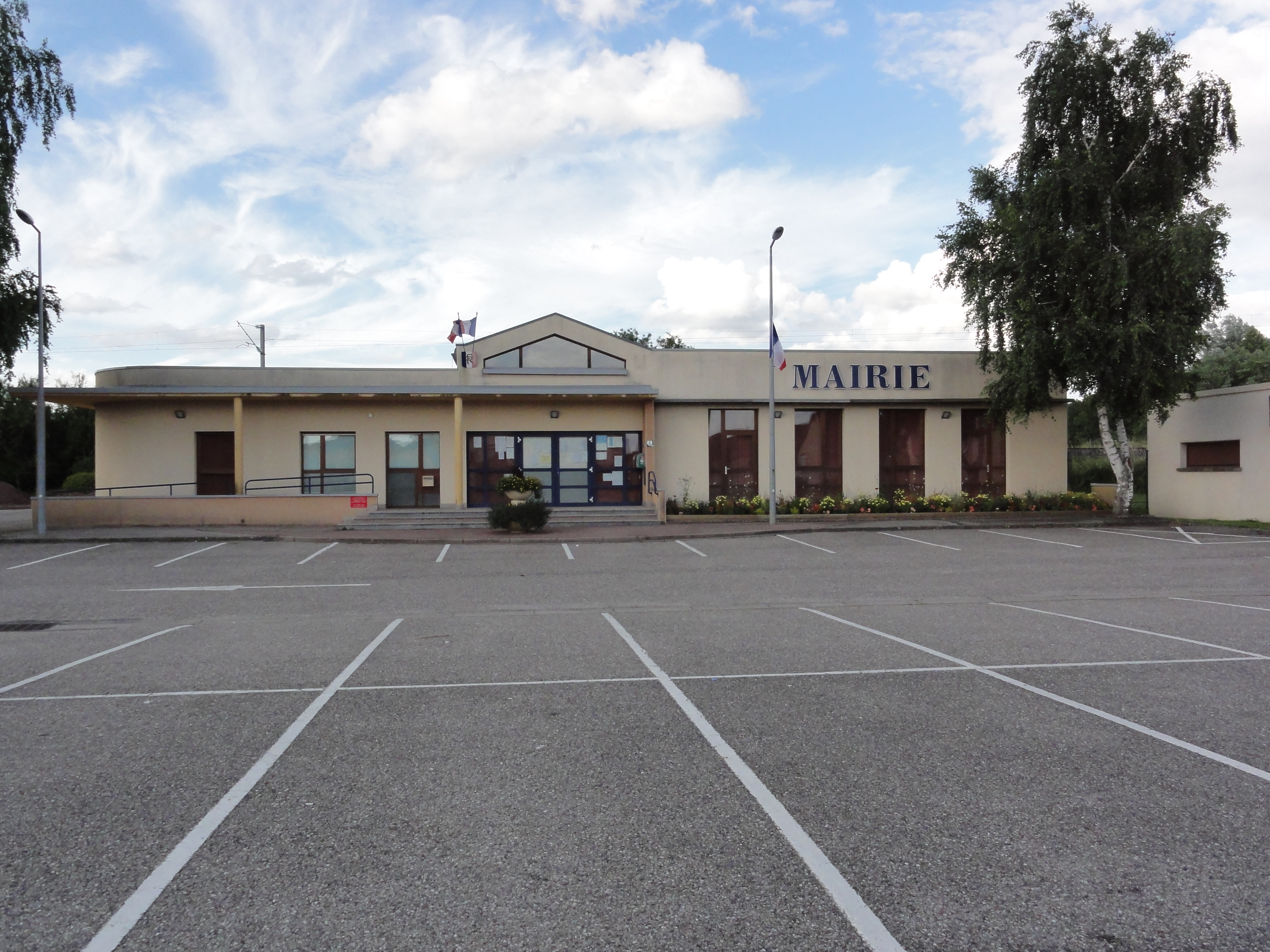
- The town hall in Moncel-lès-Lunéville

- Coat of arms
- Location of Moncel-lès-Lunéville
- Location within France Location within Grand Est
- Coordinates: 48°34′29″N 6°31′47″E
- Country: France
- Region: Grand Est
- Department: Meurthe-et-Moselle
- Arrondissement: Lunéville
- Canton: Lunéville-2
- Intercommunality: CC Territoire de Lunéville à Baccarat

Government
  - Mayor (2020–2026): Matthieu Sigiel
- Area^{1}: 21.94 km^{2} (8.47 sq mi)
- Elevation: 230 m (750 ft)
- Highest elevation: 272 m (892 ft)
- Lowest elevation: 223 m (732 ft)
- Population (2023): 612
  - Density: 27.9/km^{2} (72.2/sq mi)
- Time zone: UTC+01:00 (CET)
  - Summer (DST): UTC+02:00 (CEST)
- INSEE/Postal code: 54373 /54300
- ^{1} French Land Register data, which excludes lakes, ponds, glaciers > 1 km^{2} (0.386 sq mi or 247 acres) and river estuaries.

Moncel-lès-Lunéville (French pronunciation: [mɔ̃sɛl lɛ lynevil], literally Moncel near Lunéville) is a commune in the Meurthe-et-Moselle department in north-eastern France.

== Population ==
Historical population
Year	Pop.	±% p.a.
1968	367	—
1975	352	−0.59%
1982	402	+1.92%
1990	364	−1.23%
1999	391	+0.80%
2007	458	+2.00%
2012	582	+4.91%
2017	626	+1.47%
2023	612	−0.38%
Source: INSEE

== See also ==
- Communes of the Meurthe-et-Moselle department
