= Stanislas Naulin =

French general

Stanislas Naulin (27 April 1870 – 3 November 1932) was a French general.

He commanded the 19th Army Corps (France) after the First World War.
