= Ormes, Marne =

Ormes
- Commune
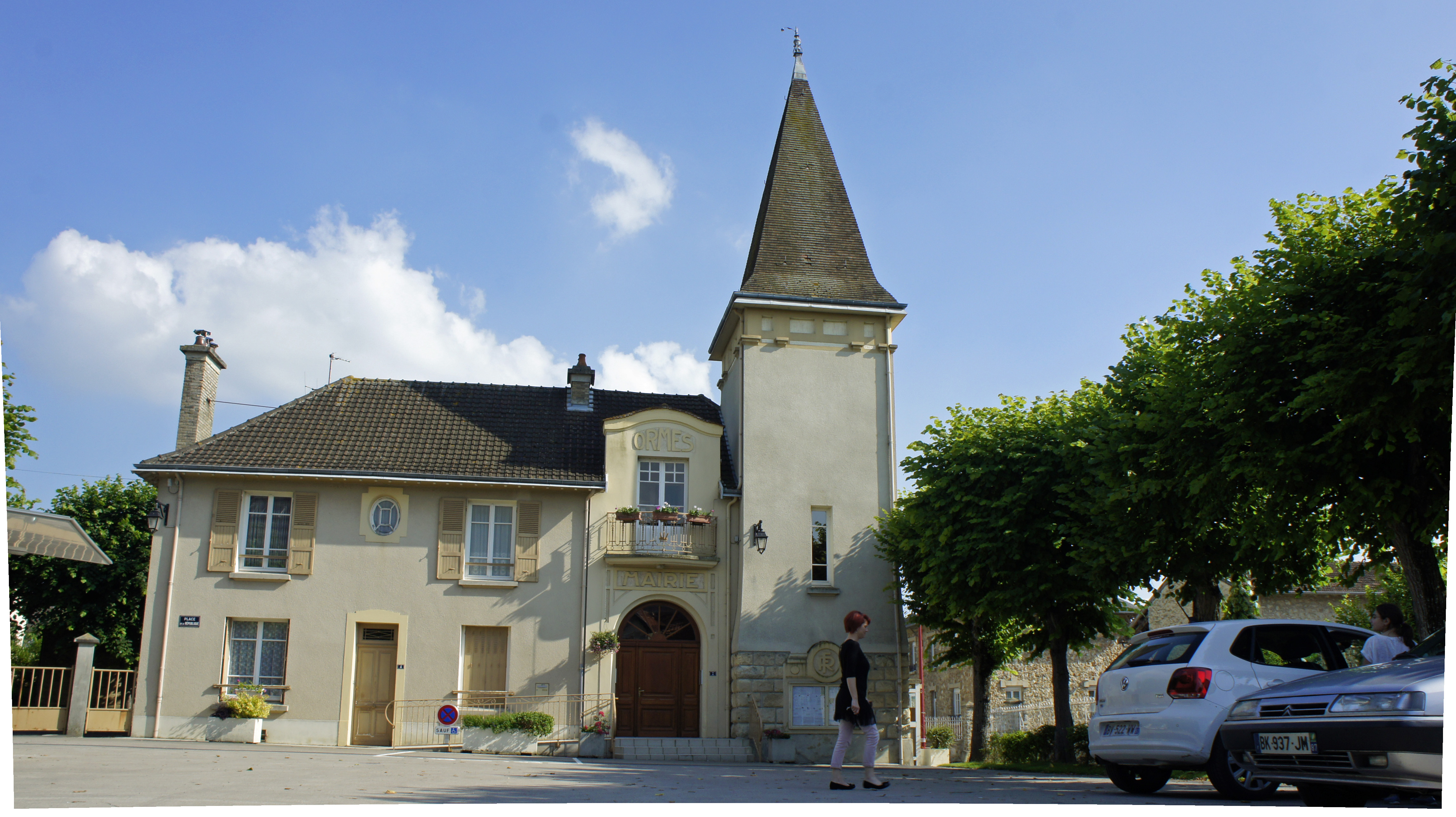
- The town hall in Ormes
- Location of Ormes
- Location within France Location within Grand Est
- Coordinates: 49°14′20″N 3°57′33″E
- Country: France
- Region: Grand Est
- Department: Marne
- Arrondissement: Reims
- Canton: Fismes-Montagne de Reims
- Intercommunality: CU Grand Reims

Government
  - Mayor (2020–2026): Michel Suply
- Area^{1}: 6.31 km^{2} (2.44 sq mi)
- Population (2023): 576
  - Density: 91.3/km^{2} (236/sq mi)
- Time zone: UTC+01:00 (CET)
  - Summer (DST): UTC+02:00 (CEST)
- INSEE/Postal code: 51418 /51370
- ^{1} French Land Register data, which excludes lakes, ponds, glaciers > 1 km^{2} (0.386 sq mi or 247 acres) and river estuaries.

Ormes (French pronunciation: [ɔʁm]) is a commune in the Marne department in north-eastern France.

== See also ==
- Communes of the Marne department
