= Rosnes =

Rosnes is a surname. Notable people with the surname include:

- Renee Rosnes (born 1962), Canadian jazz pianist, composer, and arranger
- Sigurd Heimdal Rosnes, Norwegian songwriter and producer
