= Orvillers-Sorel =

- Commune
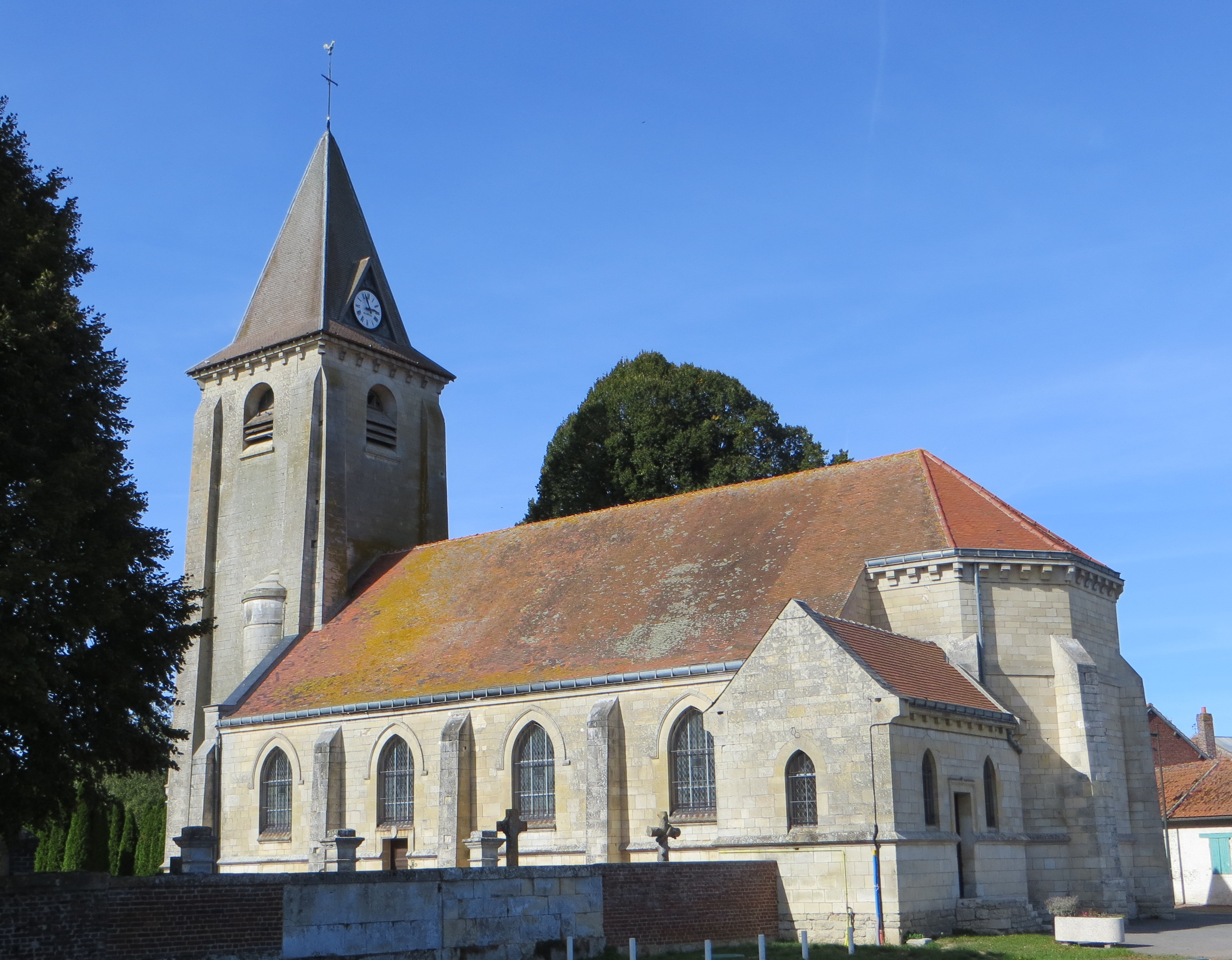
- The church in Orvillers-Sorel

- Coat of arms
- Location of Orvillers-Sorel
- Location within France Location within Hauts-de-France
- Coordinates: 49°34′44″N 2°42′30″E
- Country: France
- Region: Hauts-de-France
- Department: Oise
- Arrondissement: Compiègne
- Canton: Estrées-Saint-Denis
- Intercommunality: Pays des Sources

Government
  - Mayor (2020–2026): Francis Cormier
- Area^{1}: 8.51 km^{2} (3.29 sq mi)
- Elevation: 105 m (344 ft)
- Highest elevation: 112 m (367 ft)
- Lowest elevation: 69 m (226 ft)
- Population (2023): 513
  - Density: 60.3/km^{2} (156/sq mi)
- Time zone: UTC+01:00 (CET)
  - Summer (DST): UTC+02:00 (CEST)
- INSEE/Postal code: 60483 /60490
- ^{1} French Land Register data, which excludes lakes, ponds, glaciers > 1 km^{2} (0.386 sq mi or 247 acres) and river estuaries.

Orvillers-Sorel is a commune in the Oise department in northern France.

== See also ==
- Communes of the Oise department
