= Pontarmé =

- Commune
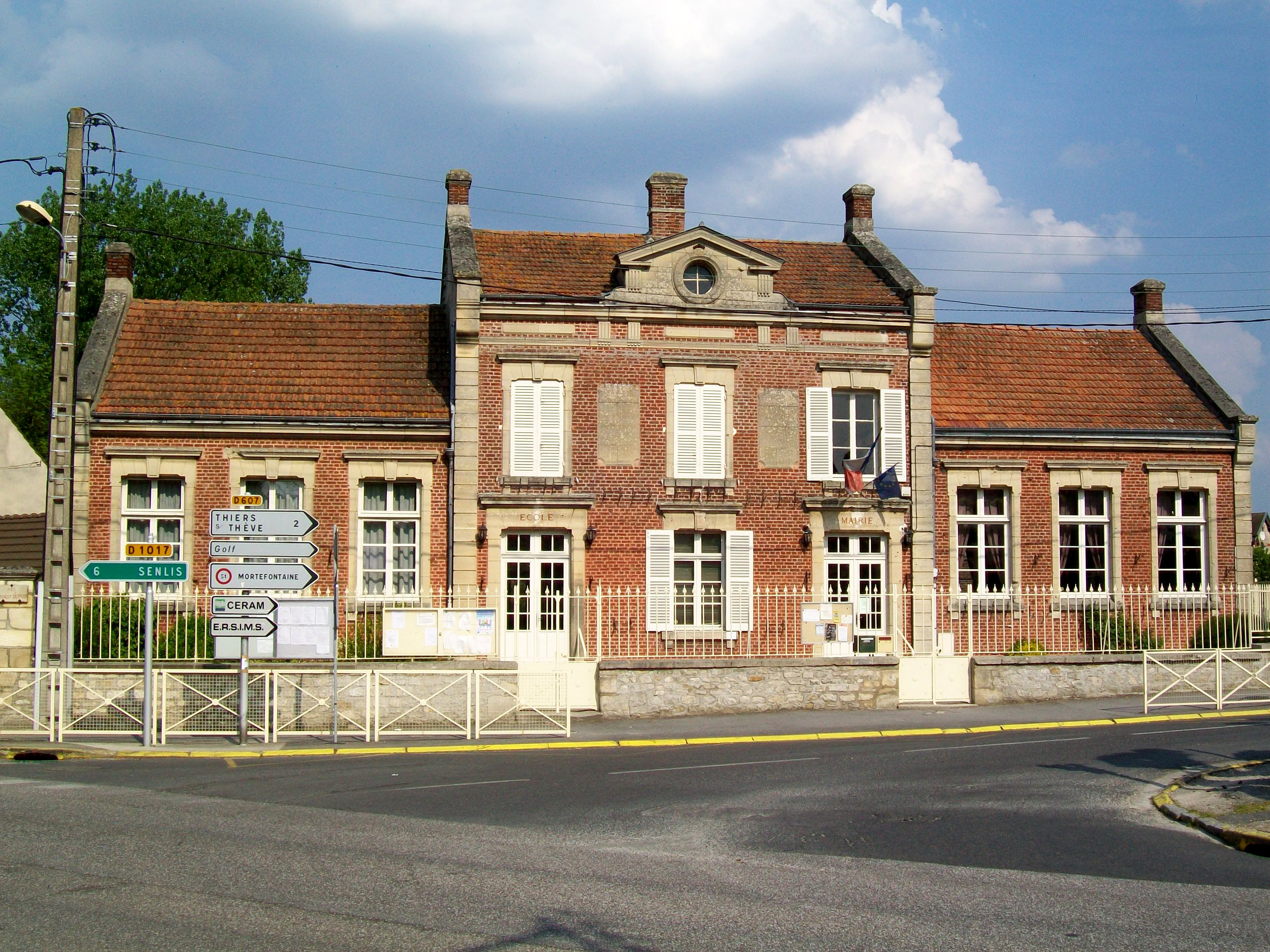
- Town hall and school
- Location of Pontarmé
- Location within France Location within Hauts-de-France
- Coordinates: 49°09′14″N 2°33′01″E
- Country: France
- Region: Hauts-de-France
- Department: Oise
- Arrondissement: Senlis
- Canton: Senlis
- Intercommunality: Senlis Sud Oise

Government
  - Mayor (2020–2026): Alain Battaglia
- Area^{1}: 13.24 km^{2} (5.11 sq mi)
- Elevation: 55 m (180 ft)
- Highest elevation: 87 m (285 ft)
- Lowest elevation: 50 m (160 ft)
- Population (2023): 905
  - Density: 68.4/km^{2} (177/sq mi)
- Time zone: UTC+01:00 (CET)
  - Summer (DST): UTC+02:00 (CEST)
- INSEE/Postal code: 60505 /60520
- ^{1} French Land Register data, which excludes lakes, ponds, glaciers > 1 km^{2} (0.386 sq mi or 247 acres) and river estuaries.

Pontarmé (French pronunciation: [pɔ̃taʁme]) is a commune in the Oise department in northern France.

== See also ==
- Communes of the Oise department
