= 7th Algerian Tirailleurs Regiment =

Former infantry unit of the French army

7th Algerian Tirailleur Regiment
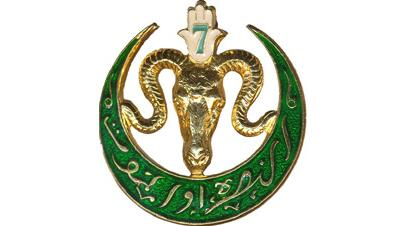
- Regimental insignia
- Active: 1913–1964
- Country: France
- Branch: French Army
- Type: Tirailleurs
- Motto: " La victoire ou la mort " (Victory or Death)
- Engagements: World War I World War II; Indochina War
- Battle honours: Artois 1915; Champagne 1915; Verdun 1915; Soissonnais 1918; Picardy 1918; Aisne 1918; Levant 1920–1921; Morocco 1925–1926; Fondouk El Okbi (Tunisia) 1943; Rome 1944; Marseille 1944; Vosges 1944; Indochina 1947–1954; AFN 1952–1962

The 7th Algerian Tirailleurs Regiment was an infantry unit of the French Army, part of the Army of Africa.

Active between 1913 and 1946, the unit is one of the most decorated of the French Army. The regiment distinguished itself in World War I, when the unit was cited six times at the orders of the armed forces and awarded the Légion d'honneur. During World War II, it was part of the 3rd Algerian Infantry Division (3^{e} DIA), notably in the Italian campaign with the French Expeditionary Corps of General Alphonse Juin, and was cited three times at the orders of the armed forces

Dissolved in 1964, the regiment became the 170th Infantry Regiment (French: 170^{e} RI).

== Creation and names ==
- 1913: creation of the 7th Marching Tirailleurs Regiment, (7^{e} RMT).
- 1919: named the 7th Algerian Tirailleurs Regiment, (7^{e} RTA).
- 1962: designated 7th Tirailleurs Regiment.
- 1964: dissolved 1 July and re-formed as the 170th Infantry Regiment.

== History ==
=== World War I ===
The 2nd battalion of the regiment remained in North Africa. It was part of the Moroccan Division and fought alongside the Marching Regiment of the Foreign Legion, the 4th Tunisian Tirailleurs Regiment and the 8th Zouaves Regiment.

==== 1914 ====
- Deployment of the IIIrd and IVth Army on the Marne
- 5–13 September: First Battle of the Marne
- First Battle of Ypres:
  - Bois Triangulaire
  - 12 November: North of Ypres

==== 1915 ====
- 28 January: Flanders: Grande Dune near Nieuport
- Second Battle of Artois:
  - Cote 140
  - 9 May: Vimy Ridge
- 25 September – 6 October: Second Battle of Champagne
  - Butte de Souains
  - 25 September: Bois Sabot

==== 1916 ====
- 4 July: Battle of the Somme: Belloy-en-Santerre

==== 1917 ====
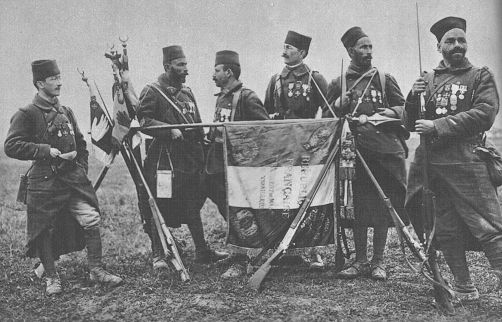
Troops of the 7th Algerian Tirailleurs Regiment with their flag, 1917

- 17 April: Mont-sans-Nom, Auberive
- Verdun

==== 1918 ====
- 26 April: Villers-Bretonneux, Bois du Hangard
- 29 May – 1 June: Montagne de Paris, Missy-aux-Bois, Chaudun
- 12 June: Amblémy
- Saint-Pierre-Aigle, Daumiers
- July 1918: Chaudun
- 28 August – 17 September: Tunnel of Vauxaillon, Neuville-sous-Marginal

==== Casualties ====
From 1914 to 1918, losses for the 7th Marching Tirailleurs Regiment were: 2326 killed or missing (97 officers, 232 junior officers, 260 corporals and 1737 soldiers).

Throughout this war, the 7th Regiment collectively obtained 31 citations and 464 medals.

=== Interwar period ===
In 1928, the 7^{e} RTA adopted the designation of 11^{e} RTA then went back to 7^{e} RTA. In 1936, the 7^{e} RTA was garrisoned at Constantine, Algeria.

=== World War II ===
==== Composition of the regiment ====
During the Second World War, one North-African tirailleur regiment consisted of a little more than 3000 men (of which 500 were officers and junior officers) and 200 vehicles. The proportion of Maghrebis reached 69% for the regiment, 74% for the battalion, 79% for the company of fusiliers-voltigeurs, 52% for the anti-tank company and 36% for the cannon infantry company.

==== Campaigns ====
- 1939: part of the 83^{e} DIA (French: 83^{e} DIA)
- 1943: belonged to the 3rd Algerian Infantry Division
- January to May 1944: Battle of Monte Cassino
- August 1944: disembarkation at Provence, liberation of Toulon and Marseille
- Fall – winter 1944: Alps, Jura, Alsace, Vosges, capture of Mulhouse and the defense of Strasbourg

==== Collective citations ====
Throughout the course of the Second World War, the 7^{e} RTA obtained ten collective citations at the orders of the armed forces (three for the regiment, four for battalions, and three for companies).

==== Casualties ====
The 3rd Algerian Infantry Division 3^{e} DIA recorded 809 killed in action in the 7th RTA from November 1942 to May 1945, of whom 614 were Maghrebis (75%) and 195 Europeans (25%).

=== Indochina War ===
Four marching battalions were constituted successively to fight in the First Indochina War, which included the heavy usage of colonial forces. The 5th Marching Battalion (V/7^{e} RTA), under chief of battalion Roland de Mecquenem, was at the Battle of Dien Bien Phu during the Gabrielle resistance. After a heavy artillery bombardment they retreated from the Viet Minh's 308th Infantry Division.

=== Algerian War ===
The 7^{e} RTA fought in the Algerian War, in the corps of the 21st Infantry Division, in the sector of Aurès Nemencha. At the cease-fire on 19 March 1962, the regiment constituted along with 91 other regiments, a local unit force of the Algerian order of battle, the 427 UFL-UFO composed of 10% of metropolitan military and 90% of Muslim military personnel at Barika, during the transition period, while being at the service of the executive provisionary power of Algeria until the independence of Algeria (Evian Accords, 18 March 1962).

Following that, the regiment was back in France in 1962, and garrisoned until 1964, when the unit was dissolved to form the 170th Infantry Regiment.

== Traditions ==
=== Decorations ===
The regimental colors are decorated with:

- Légion d'honneur (1919):
  - Cited for the First World War
- Croix de guerre 1914–1918 with:
  - Six palms one vermeil star
- Croix de guerre 1939-1945 with:
  - Three palms
- Croix de guerre des théâtres d'opérations extérieures with:
  - Three palms (One for the Levant, one for Indochina and one for Morocco)
- Ordre de Mérite Militaire Chérifien
- Fourragère:
  - Colors of the Légion d'honneur with olives of the colors of the croix de guerre 1939–1945

The regiment was the first indigenous to be awarded the fourragère with the colors of the Croix de la Légion d'honneur (1914–1918).

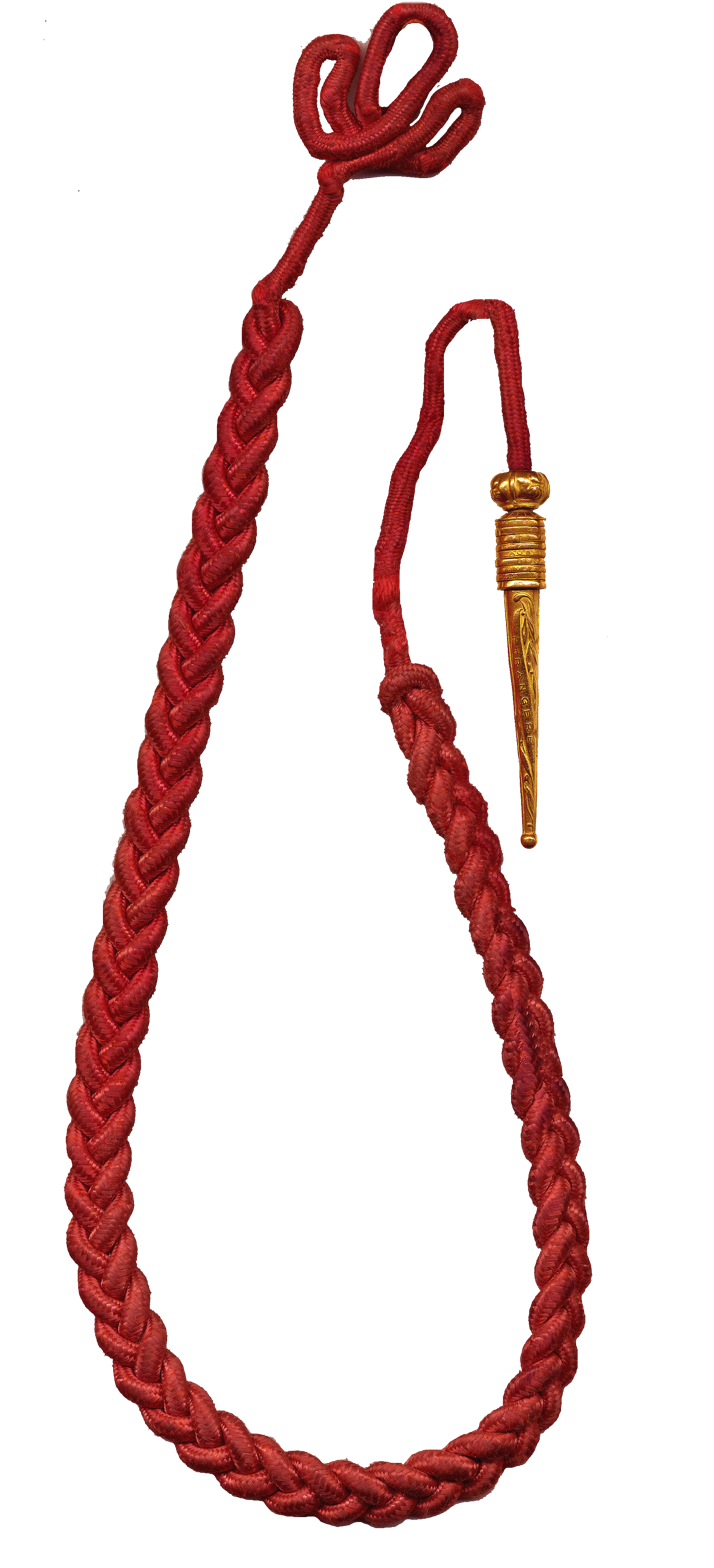
Red fourragère with colors of the Légion d'honneur

=== Battle Honours ===
- Artois 1915
- Champagne 1915
- Verdun 1915
- Soissonnais 1918
- Picardy 1918
- Aisne 1918
- Levant 1920–1921
- Morocco 1925–1926
- Fondouk El Okbi 1943
- Rome 1944
- Marseille 1944
- Vosges 1944
- Indochina 1947–1954
- AFN 1952–1962

== Regimental commanders ==
- Lt-Colonel Fellert: August 1914 – September 1914
- Lt-Colonel Levêque: October 1914 – December 1914
- Cdt Jacquot: December 1914 – January 1915
- Lt-Colonel Demetz: January 1915 – February 1916
- Lt-Colonel Schuhler: February 1916 – May 1916
- Lt-Colonel Schultz: May 1916 – May 1918
- Lt-Colonel Mensier: June 1918

== Regimental Commanders ==
- 1913 – 1914: Colonel Mathieu
- 1914 – 1916: Lt-Colonel Laurent
- 1916 – 1916: Lt-Colonel Demaris
- 1916 – 1916: Lt-Colonel Delom
- 1916 – 1917: Cdt Pimont
- 1917 – 1918: Lt-Colonel Felici
- 1918 – 1918: Cdt Conneau
- 1918 – 1918: Lt-Colonel Vaissières
- 1918 – 1918: Colonel Fropo
- 1918 – 1919: Colonel Lamiable
- 1919 – 1920: Lt-Colonel Fadat
- 1920 – 1920: Cdt de Font Reaulx
- 1920 – 1920: Cdt Diard
- 1920 – 1920: Lt-Colonel Fadat
- 1920 – 1920: Cdt Diard
- 1920 – 1920: Cdt de Font Reaulx
- 1920 – 1924: Colonel Lemaître
- 1924 – 1928: Colonel Pidaud
- 1928 – 1930: Colonel Pichon
- 1930 – 1933: Colonel de Tassy de Montluc
- 1933 – 1937: Colonel Watrin
- 1937 – 1940: Colonel Richard
- 1940 – 1942: Colonel Cortot
- 1942 – 1943: Colonel Regnault
- 1943 – 1944: Colonel Chappuis
- 1944 – 1944: Lt-Colonel Pichot
- 1944 – 1945: Colonel Goutard
- 1945 – 1947: Colonel Lardin
- 1947 – 1948: Colonel Allard
- 1948 – 1950: Colonel Du Passage
- 1950 – 1952: Colonel Costantini
- 1952 – 1954: Colonel Derville
- 1954 – 1956: Colonel Arfouilloux
- 1956 – 1958: Colonel de Raffin de la Raffinie
- 1958 – 1960: Colonel Chevallier
- 1960 – 1961: Colonel Ahmed Rafa
- 1961: Colonel Breil

== Honorary arms particular to the regiment ==
- Combats of 9 May 1915 in Artois.
- Combats of 25 September 1915 in Champagne.
- Combats of 20 August 1917 at Verdun.
- Combats of April 1918 in the Somme.
- Combats of 29 to 31 May and 18 to 20 July in Aisne.
- Combats of 2 September to September 1918 in the Aisne.
- Combats of 17 April 1917 in Champagne.

== Officers and Tirailleurs ==
- General Jacques Schmitt (1919–2005), volunteer in 1941. Twelve citations, commander of the Légion d'honneur.

== See also ==
- 3rd Algerian Tirailleurs Regiment

== Bibliography ==
- Les Africains, Historama, hors-série n° 10, 1970
- Anthony Clayton, Histoire de l'Armée française en Afrique 1830–1962, Albin Michel, 1994
- L'Armée d'Afrique: 1830–1962, Charles-Lavauzelle, 1977
- De Sétif à Marseille, par Cassino, (Preface by General Jean Delaunay – commentary by Colonel Henri Ortholan) Editions Anovi 2007
- General Jacques Schmitt, Journal d'un officier de Tirailleurs (1944) (Preface by Colonel Ortholan), Editions Bernard Giovanangeli, 2010.
