= 4th Tunisian Tirailleurs Regiment =

4^{e} Régiment de Tirailleurs Tunisiens
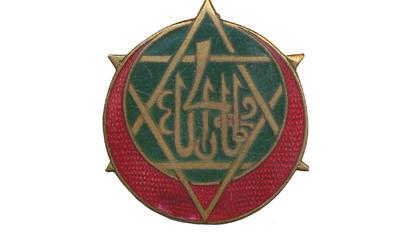
- Regimental insignia
- Active: 1884 - 1956
- Country: France
- Branch: French Army
- Type: Tirailleurs
- Mottos: « Sous la garde d'Allah » (Fr) « Sous la protection d'Allah » (Fr)
- Engagements: World War I World War II; Indochina War
- Battle honours: Casablanca 1908; Guise 1914; Artois 1915; Champagne 1915; Verdun 1917; Aisne 1918; Picardy 1918; Somme-Py 1918; Le Belvédère 1944; Garigliano 1944; Vosges 1944; Stuttgart 1945; Indochina 1947-1954

The 4th Tunisian Tirailleurs Regiment (French: 4^{e} Régiment de Tirailleurs Tunisiens, 4^{e} RTT) was an infantry regiment of the Army of Africa, part of the French Army.

Active between 1884 and 1956, the regiment was one of the most decorated of the French Army. The regiment had a distinguished record during World War I, being cited six times. It was decorated with the Légion d'honneur during World War II, as part of the 3rd Algerian Infantry Division (3^{e} DIA). During the Italian campaign, it served with the French Expeditionary Corps under General Alphonse Juin, and was cited four times at the orders of the armed forces.

== History ==
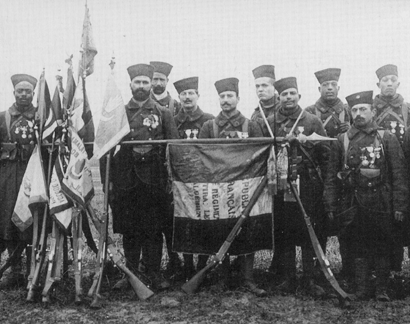
Regimental colors of the 4^{e} RTT in 1917

From their establishment, the Algerian and Tunisian tirailleurs regiments were given sequential numbering (1st Tirailleurs, 2nd etc.). This possibly reflected the fact that the areas of recruitment had formerly been part of territories under Ottoman guardianship administered by the Dey of Algiers and the Bey of Tunis. Frequently these regiments drew from serving soldiers already employed by the Ottoman Empire. The popular nickname "Turcos" bestowed on these units may owe its origin to this. According to other sources, the tirailleurs gained that designation during the Crimean War when Algerian infantry in the French expeditionary force were sometimes mistaken for their Turkish allies.

Created on December 14, 1884, under the name of 4th Tirailleurs, the unit was constituted of Tunisian soldiers and French officers . Non-commissioned officers were both Tunisian and French. With the addition of some French volunteers as soldats, the non-Tunisian element in the regiment was eventually to comprise between 20% and 30% of the total strength. In 1899 the unit had six battalions of 600 men each.

In October 1900, the first battalion was sent to Tonkin, and in 1907 and 1908, the 2nd and 4th battalions were engaged in the campaign of Morocco with the 3rd battalion rejoining Chaouia-Ourdigha by the 4th battalion. From October 1911 to September 1912, six of the twelve battalions of the 4^{e} RTT were engaged in combat in the French protectorate. In a message addressed to the Bey of Tunisia, on April 22, 1911, the French ambassador to Morocco underlined their "valor, discipline and commitment [...] above all".

=== World War I ===
In the course of World War I, France mobilized 62,461 Muslim tirailleurs and spahis in Tunisia, together with 9,000 French soldiers and 24,442 indigenous colonial workers, numbering in total 86,903 men. Engaged for the first time on August 23, 1914 at Hanzinelle in Belgium, these Tunisian soldiers experienced extensive service in WW1 trench warfare.

==== 1914 ====
On August 2, 1914, the 4th Marching Regiment (4^{e} RMT) was formed in Tunisia. The marching regiment was initially composed of the 6th and 1st battalions of the 4^{e} RTT.

On October 29, 1914, the 4^{e} RMT received the 5th battalion of the 4^{e} RTT from the marching tirailleurs regiment of the Moroccan Division. Initially attached to the 38th Infantry Division (French: 38^{e} DI), the 4^{e} passed to the Moroccan Division on November 24, 1914, alongside the Marching Regiment of the Foreign Legion (RMLE), the 7th Algerian Tirailleurs Regiment (7^{e} RTA) as well the 8th Zouaves Regiment (8^{e} RZ).

==== 1915 ====
- May 9 - June 16: Second Battle of Artois
- September 25 - October 6 : Second Battle of Champagne

==== 1916 ====
- July 1-13: Battle of the Somme: Chancellor Trench

==== 1917 ====
- April 17-20 Battle of the Hills: Moronvillers
- August 20 - September 3: Verdun

==== 1918 ====
- April 26: Second Battle of Villers-Bretonneux
- May 28 - June 16: Third Battle of the Aisne; Soissons

On August 4, 1918, the regiment joined the 2nd Moroccan Division.

- August 28 - September 4: Crecy-au-Mont
- September 25-29: Battle of Somme-Py
- October 17-21: Meuse-Argonne Offensive; Beaurepaire Ravine

The regiment earned the Croix de guerre and the Légion d'honneur. In addition six citations were awarded collectively to the regiment and seven to individual battalions.

A detachment of the 4th RTT participated in the victory parade of July 14, 1919.

A total of 16,509 Tunisian soldiers in French service were killed in World War I out of a total Algerian, Moroccan and Tunisian death toll of between 28,000 and 36,000. Another source puts Tunisian losses at 10,500 out of 63,000.

The war cost the 4th RTT 13,646 casualties (killed, wounded, and missing).

=== World War II ===
==== Battle of France (1939-1940) ====
On June 16, 1940, while the regiment was known as the 4^{e} RTT of the 84th African Infantry Division (French: 84^{e} Division d'Infanterie d'Afrique), 63 soldiers were killed in Ablis. A commemorative plaque honors the 4^{e} Tunisian Tirailleurs Regiment. Among the deceased was soldier Mohamed Amar Hedhili Ben Salem Ben Hadj, whose body was transferred in November 1945 to the Mémorial de la France combattante at Mont Valérien.

==== Tunisian campaign (1943) ====
During the Tunisia Campaign, equipped with material from whatever sources were available, the regiment fought alongside French, American and British units.

==== Italian campaign (1943-1944) ====
In 1944, during the Italian campaign, the 4th RTT was commanded by Colonel Jacques Roux and then by Colonel Guillebaud. The regiment together with the 3rd Algerian Tirailleurs Regiment (3^{e} RTA) and 7th Algerian Tirailleurs Regiment (7th RTA), constituted the infantry of the 3rd Algerian Infantry Division (3rd DIA) commanded by General Joseph de Goislard de Monsabert at the French Expeditionary Corps. The regiment fought in the region of Monte Cassino; succeeding in reaching the Gustav line and capturing Belvédère. During this combat, which lasted from January 25 to February 4, 1944, losses were heavy: half of the effectives of the regiment and three-quarters of its officers, including Colonel Jacques Roux), were killed or wounded (207 killed, 75 missing, 1090 wounded). According to Charles de Gaulle, during the Belvédère fighting: "the 4th Tunisian Tirailleurs Regiment accomplished one of the most brilliant successes of arms endeavours at the cost of enormous heavy losses."

==== Campaign of France (1944-1945) ====
Following the Belvédère, while decimated, the regiment reconstituted and participated in the disembarkation in Provence in August 1944, the other decisive combats, in the Doubs, the Vosges (notably during the combats of Hohneck, in Alsace then Germany. Accordingly, Adjudant-chef Ahmed El Abed was the first military of the French Army to penetrate Germany in 1945: he reached the iced waters of the river of Lauter with a couple of dozen combatants and on March 14 took the village of Scheibenhardt.

==== Casualties ====
From January 10, 1944 to April 24, 1945, the 4^{e} RTT endured the loss of 1009 men (575 in Italy, 342 in France, and 92 in Germany), 879 disappeared and 4053 wounded. From the 26000 Tunisians which partook in combat, 1700 were lost at the end of war with 450 declared disappeared.

=== Indochina War ===
The 4^{e} RTT was reconstituted on February 1, 1949. The 2nd and 3rd battalions of the regiment were dispatched first to Cambodia and then to South Viet-Nam, where they served until 1955.

== 1956 ==
With the ending of the Indochina War the various tirailleur units involved were disbanded or returned to their respective countries of origin. Tunisia was on the verge of independence which was proclaimed on March 20, 1956. Some of the veterans of the 4th TTR were integrated into the newly established Tunisian National Army alongside other local contingent forces. The 4th Tunisian Tirailleurs continued in existence until September 1958 and was reassigned to France. The regiment was then reconstituted as the 4th Tirailleurs Regiment, which was posted to the Southern Territory of Algeria on September 18, 1958. Its personnel were now a mixture of French and Algerian conscripts and regulars, together with some Tunisian volunteers who had opted to continue in French service.

== Post Algerian War ==
The 4th Tirailleurs Regiment was disbanded at the end of the Algerian War in 1962, together with most units of the former Army of Africa. The 1st Tirailleurs Regiment (French: 1^{er} Régiment de Tirailleurs, 1^{e} RT) was recreated on May 21, 1994. The 4th company of the modern regiment preserves the traditions of the 4th Tunisian Tirailleurs Regiment.

== Traditions ==
=== Insignia ===
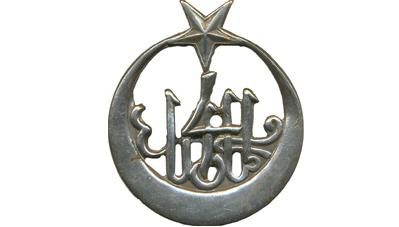
Insignia of the 4th Tunisian Tirailleurs Regiment
(2nd model)

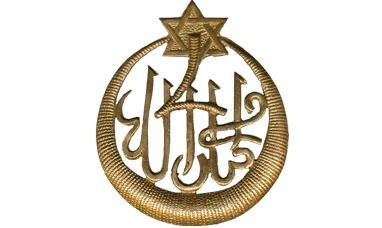
Regimental insignia of the 4th Tunisian Tirailleurs Regiment
(3rd model)

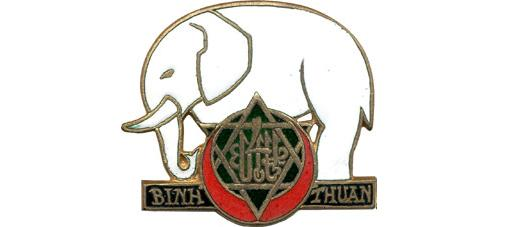
Insignia of the Marching Battalion of the 4th Tunisian Tirailleurs Regiment

=== Regimental Colors ===
Regimental Colors of the 4^{e} RTT

=== Decorations ===
The Regimental Colors of the 4^{e} RTT is decorated with:

- Croix de la Légion d'honneur (1919)
- Croix de guerre 1914-1918 with :
  - 6 palms and a bronze star
- Croix de guerre 1939-1945 with :
  - 4 palms
- Croix de guerre des théâtres d'opérations extérieures with:
  - 1 palm
- Ordre du Mérite Chérifien
- Ordre du Nichan Iftikhar

Fourragere:

- The Regimental Colors of the 4^{e} RTT is decorated with the fourragere with colors of the Légion d'honneur with two olives: cut olive with colors of the légion d'honneur and the croix de guerre 1914-1918 and cut olive with colors of the Médaille militaire and croix de guerre 1939-1945.

Similarly to the 7th Algerian Tirailleurs Regiment, the regiment bears wearing the red fourragere.

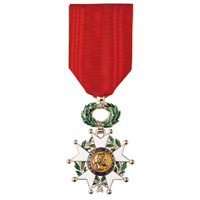
Légion d'honneur

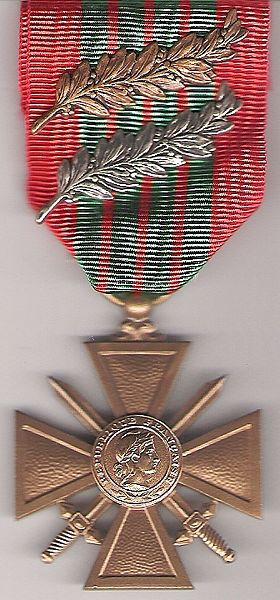
Croix de guerre 1939-1945

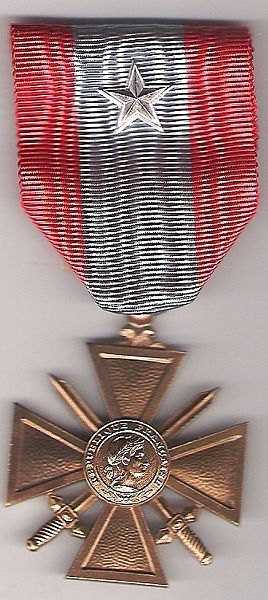
Croix de guerre des Théâtres d'opérations extérieures

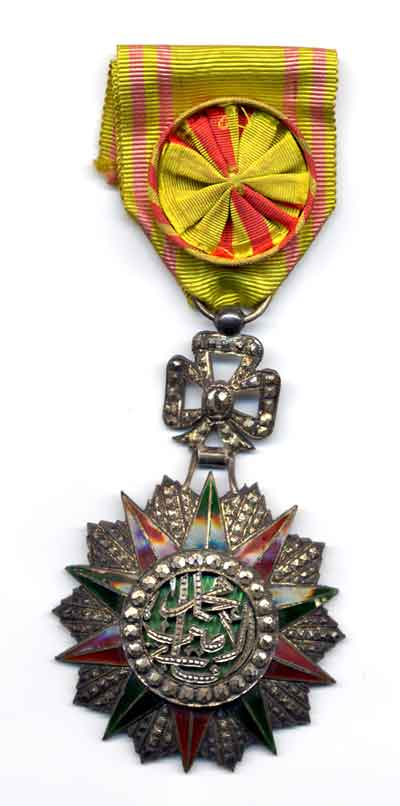
Nichan Iftikhar
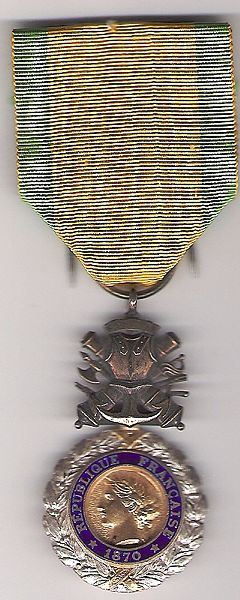
Médaille militaire

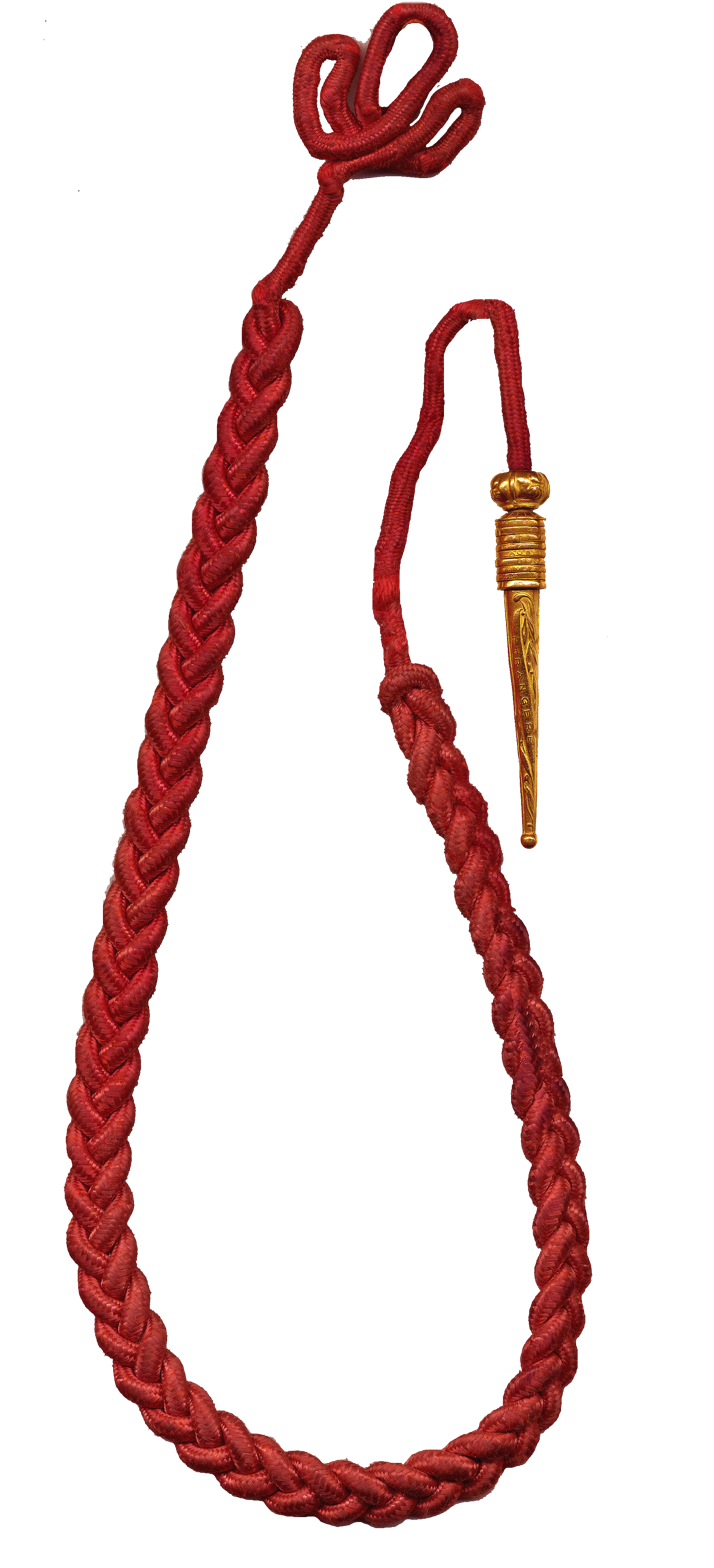
Red Fourragere

=== Uniforms ===
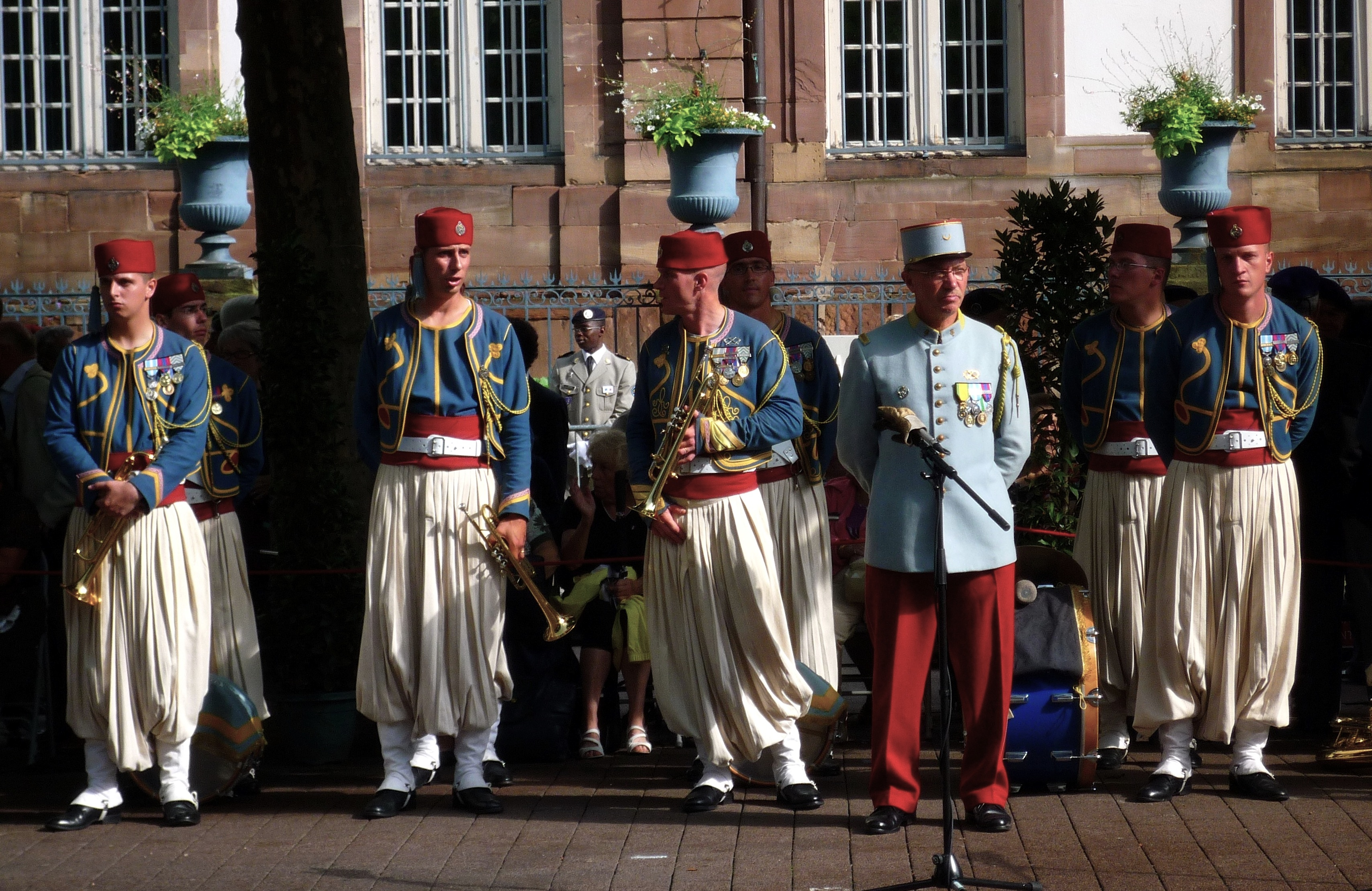
Soldiers of the modern 1st Tirailleur regiment of Épinal wearing the same full dress as that of the 4th Tunisian Tirailleurs from 1884 until 1956

From its establishment in 1884 until the outbreak of World War I in 1914, the 4th Tunisian Tirailleurs wore the zouave style uniform of the Algerian tirailleurs. The distinguishing feature of the Tunisian regiment were light blue tombeaus (false pockets) on the front of their blue and yellow vestes (short jackets). Complete with red fezzes and waist sashes, this North African style of clothing was reintroduced for parade and off-duty wear in 1932. On other occasions the standard khaki service dress of the Army of Africa was usually worn.

=== Honours ===
==== Battle honours ====
- Casablanca 1908
- Guise 1914
- Artois 1915
- Champagne 1915
- Verdun 1917
- L'Aisne 1918
- Picardie 1918
- Somme-Py 1918
- Le Belvédère 1944
- Garigliano 1944
- Vosges 1944
- Stuttgart 1945
- Indochine 1947-1954

== Regimental Commanders ==
- Lieutenant-colonel Daugan, regimental commander at temporary title on September 29, 1914, then at definite title on December 25, 1914 and until January 19, 1916.
- January 20 - February 24, 1916 : Lieutenant-colonel Maurice
- February 25 - July 28, 1916 : Lieutenant-colonel Dardenne
- 1943 - January 27, 1944 : Colonel Roux †. Killed in action in January during combats at Belvédère.
- 1944 - 1945 : Colonel Guillebaud

== Notable members ==
- Aspirant Robert Séguin (1921-1944) †, September 7, 1944
- Lieutenant then Captain Bernard Pécout, chief medic of the 1st battalion then chief medic of the regiment, 1956-1957.

== See also ==
- 3rd Algerian Tirailleurs Regiment
- French: Tirailleurs Algériens
