= 3rd Algerian Tirailleurs Regiment =

Infantry Unit

3^{e} Régiment de Tirailleurs Algériens
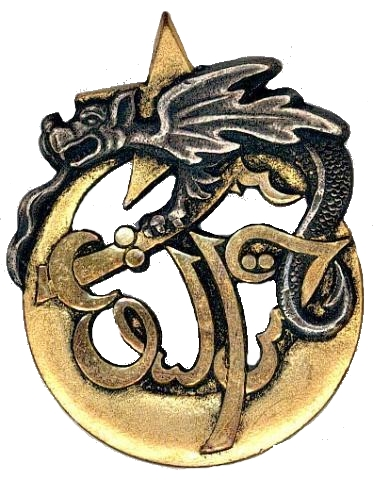
- Regimental insignia
- Active: 1856–1962
- Country: France
- Branch: French Army
- Type: Tirailleurs
- Mottos: Jusqu'à la mort (Until death)
- Engagements: Crimean War; French intervention in Mexico; Franco-Prussian War; World War I World War II; Indochina War
- Battle honours: Laghouat 1852; Sebastopol 1854–1855; Solferino 1859; San Lorenzo 1863; Far East 1884–1885; Morocco 1907–1913; Champagne 1915; Verdun 1916; Aisne 1918; Medjez el-Bab 1943; Abruzzo 1944; Rome 1944; Toulon 1944; Vosges 1944; Indochina 1947-1954; AFN 1952–1962

The 3rd Algerian Tirailleurs Regiment (3^{e} R.T.A) was an infantry unit of the Army of Africa in the French Army. Recruited primarily from Algerian Muslims, it was mainly commanded by French officers. The racial boundaries were not absolute, with some French volunteers serving in the ranks and a limited number of Muslims being appointed as officers. After 1913 a selective form of conscription was applied to Algerian Muslims but the majority of Muslim soldiers serving in the 3^{e} R.T.A continued to be voluntarily enlisted.

During its existence from 1842 to 1962, the regiment distinguished itself in the intervention in Mexico, during the Battle of San Lorenzo, which earned the regiment the Légion d'honneur and specially during World War II during which, commanded by Colonel François de Linares then Colonel Agostini as part of the 3rd Algerian Infantry Division, the regiment was cited four times at the orders of the armed forces.

The 3^{e} RTA was one of the five most-decorated French regiments of the Second World War; along with the 4th Tunisian Tirailleurs Regiment (4^{e} RTT), the 2nd Moroccan Tabors Group, the Chad Marching Regiment (French: Régiment de marche du Tchad) and the 13th Demi-Brigade of the Foreign Legion.

== Names ==
- 1842 : 3rd Indigenous Battalion of Constantine
- 1856 : 3rd Algerian Tirailleurs Regiment, 3^{e} RTA
- 1962 : disbanded

The regiment originated as the indigenous (locally recruited Muslim) Battalion of Constantine, created in Algeria in 1842. In 1856 the battalion was designated as the 3^{e} RTA. The regiment was dissolved in 1962.

== History ==
=== 1815 to 1848 ===
- French conquest of Algeria (French: Conquête de l'Algérie par la France)
  - Regiments having participated to the conquest of Algeria by France (French: Régiments ayant participé à la conquête de l'Algérie par la France)

=== Second French Empire ===
==== Franco-Prussian War of 1870 ====
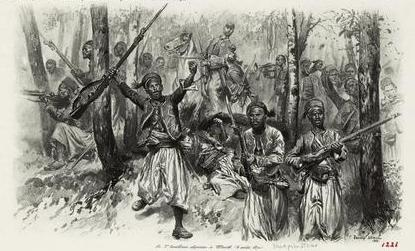
3rd Algerian Tirailleurs Regiment at Woerth in 1870

On August 1, 1870, the 3rd Algerian Tirailleurs Regiment formed part of the Army of the Rhin.

Together with the 87th Infantry Regiment commanded by Colonel Blot, the 3rd formed the 2nd Brigade under the orders of Général Lacretelle. This 2nd Brigade, together with the 1st Brigade of Général Fraboulet de Kerléadec, two batteries of artillery plus one of mitrailleuse, and one engineer company constituted the 4th Infantry Division commanded by Général de division de Lartigue. The division was part of the 1st Army Corps with Marshal Patrice de MacMahon, Duke of Magenta as commanding general.

On August 17, 1870, the 3rd Algerian Tirailleurs Regiment was part of the Army of Châlons.

With the 87th Infantry Regiment of Colonel Blot, the 2nd Marching Regiment of Lt-Colonel de Lenchey and the 3rd Battalion of the 3rd Grenadiers of the Guard, the 3rd formed the 2nd Brigade at the orders of Général Carrey de Bellemare. This 2nd Brigade with the 1st Brigade of Général Fraboulet de Kerléadec, two batteries de 4 and one de mitrailleuse, and one engineer company constituted the 4th Infantry Division commanded by Général de brigade de Lartigue. The division was part of the 1st Army Corps with Général de division Auguste-Alexandre Ducrot as commanding general.

=== World War I ===
==== 1914 ====
- Vers Charleroi : Oret, Mettet (August 23), Florennes (August 24)
- Unfolding of the IIIrd Army and IV Army: Courgivaux, Petit-Morin
- Battle of the Marne : Cuts-la-Pommeraye (September 15–17)

==== 1915 ====
- Ist Army and IIIrd Army in Argonne and one Meuse: Plateau des Loges
- September 25 - October 6 : Second Battle of Champagne Épine de Védegrange

==== 1916 ====
- Battle of Verdun : Louvemont, Côte-du-Poivre (February), Souville (July)
- Apprehending of the Forts de Douaumont and Forts de Vaux: Bois le Chaume, Bezonveaux (December 15)

==== 1917 ====
- Verdun: Côte 304

==== 1918 ====
- Moreuil (August 8)
- Battle of Noyon (August 28)
- Chauny, Tergnier

=== World War II ===
==== Composition of the regiment ====
During the Second World War, one North-African tirailleur regiment consisted a little more than 3000 men (out of which 500 officers and sous-officiers) and 200 vehicles. The proportion of Maghrebis reach 69% for the regiment, 74% for the battalion, 79% for the company of fusiliers-voltigeurs, 52% for the anti-tank company and 36% for the cannon infantry company.

==== Campaigns ====
In 1943, the 3^{e} RTA formed part of the Marching Division of Constantibe, subsequently designated as the 3rd Algerian Infantry Division. The regiment earned distinction in Tunisia then during the Italian campaign: first in January 1944 while apprehending Monna Acquafondata, then Operation Diadem in May 1944. The regiment was cited twice during that campaign, carrying the inscriptions: "Abruzzes 1944" and "Rome 1944" on its colours.

Disembarked at Provence on August 15, 1944, the 3^{e} DIA entered first to Toulon, participated to the Liberation of Marseille, manoeuver during which the 3^{e} and 7^{e} RTA formed the forward contingent. The regiment made way towards the Alpes and Jura, until the Alsace. Accordingly, the regiment then mounted the confrontations in the Vosges, apprehended Mulhouse and mounted the defensive of Strasbourg at Kilstett, in January 1945.

The 3^{e} DIA mounted the assault on the Siegfried line, reached the Rhin at Spire and apprehended Stuttgart. Since Naples, the 3^{e} DIA endured the loss of 4000 killed and 12,000 wounded.

==== Collective citations ====
Throughout the course of Second World War, the 3^{e} RTA obtained 7 collective citations at the orders of the armed forces (4 for the regiment and 3 for the battalions).

==== Casualties ====
The 3^{e} DIA recorded 811 killed in action in the 3^{e} RTA from November 1942 to May 1945, out of which 614 Maghrebis (75%) and 197 Europeans (25%).

=== Since 1945 ===
In the spring of 1947, the following tirailleur units were disembarked at Saigon: the B.M of the 1st (French: 1^{er}), 2nd (French: 2^{e}), 3^{e} RTA, 7^{e} RTA and the 4^{e} RTT, and the 25^{e}, 23^{e} and 27^{e} BTA. All eight of these battalions, were repatriated from Indo China to North Africa within 24 to 30 months.

- 1954 : Battle of Dien Bien Phu

== Disbandment ==
Following the campaign in Indochina, the regiment returned to Algeria. Following the outbreak of the Algerian War in 1954 the 3^{e} RTA was involved in active service in the region of Constantine.

- In 1955, the regiment provided support for the creation of the 3rd Company Group of Algerian Nomades (1st, 2nd, 3rd Algerian Nomades Companies (French: Compagnies Nomades d'Algérie))
- At the end of the Algerian War in 1962, the majority of the units formerly comprising the French Army of Africa were disbanded. Algerian Muslim conscripts were demobilised while long service volunteers were given the option of transferring to other units of the French Army. The 3^{e} RTA was amongst the regiments dissolved.

== Traditions ==
=== Decorations ===
The regimental colors of the 3rd Algerian Tirailleurs Regiment are decorated with:

- Croix of the Légion d'honneur in 1863 for the capture of two flags on May 8, 1863 during the Battle of San Lorenzo, by tirailleur Ahmed Ben Miloud, who was awarded the Médaille militaire;
- Croix de guerre 1914–1918 with:
  - 2 palms and 1 silver star
- Croix de guerre 1939-1945 with:
  - Four palms.
- Médaille d'Or de la Ville de Milan

Fourragere:

- The Regimental Colors bear wearing the fourragere with colors of the Médaille militaire with olives of the colors of the Croix de Guerre 1914–1918
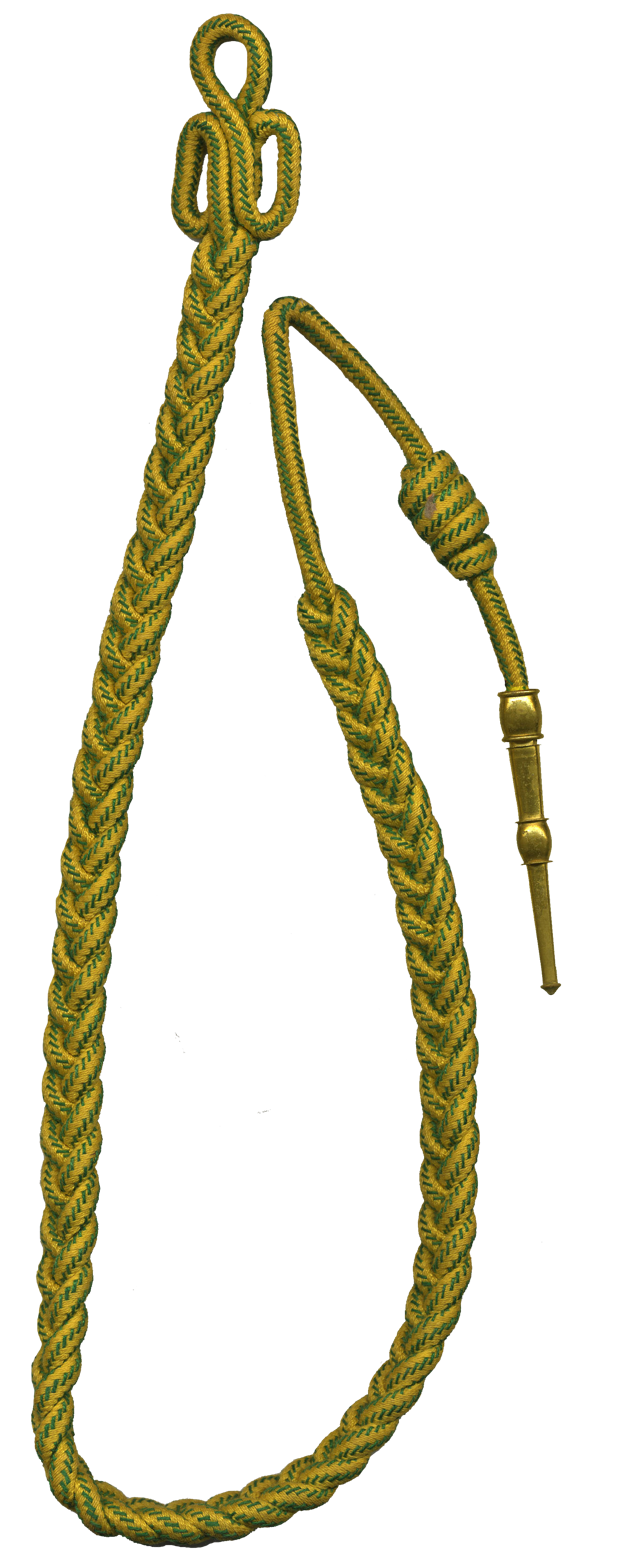
colors of the médaille militaire without the olive 14–18

=== Honours ===
==== Battle honours ====
- Artois 1915
- Champagne 1915
- Verdun 1916
- Soissonnais 1918
- Picardy 1918
- Aisne 1918
- Levant 1920-–1921
- Morocco 1925–1926
- Fondouk El Okbi 1943
- Rome 1944
- Marseille 1944
- Vosges 1944
- Indochine 1947–1954
- AFN 1952–1962

== Regimental Commanders ==
- 1811 - ... : Colonel commandant Adrien
- 1818 - ... : Chef de bataillon Frédéric
- 1825 - ... : Lieutenant Dieudonné
- 1870 : Colonel Gandil
- 1870 : Colonel Barrué
- 1905 - ... : Colonel Gabriel (1849-1930)
- World War I
  - Until August 25, 1914 : Colonel Simon, provisionary command was assured by commandant Demaris
  - From September 19, 1914 to April 28, 1916 : Lieutenant-colonel de Gouvello
  - From April 28 to August 6, 1916 : Colonel Thouvenel, provisionary command was assured by Commandant Gonnel then Commandant Le Clerc
  - From August 26 to October 7, 1916 : Colonel Simon
  - Since October 7, 1916 : Lieutenant-colonel Vibert
- World War II
  - 19/09/1943 – 15/09/1944: Colonel de Linarès
  - 15/09/1944 – March 1945: Colonel Agostini
  - March 1945 - ... : Colonel de la Boisse
  - 1958 - ... : Général Gandoet commanding the 19th Infantry Division

== See also ==
- Moroccan Division
