= Army of Africa =

Army of Africa may refer to:

- Army of Africa (France)
- Army of Africa (Spain)
- Panzer Army Africa
