= 2nd Moroccan Division =

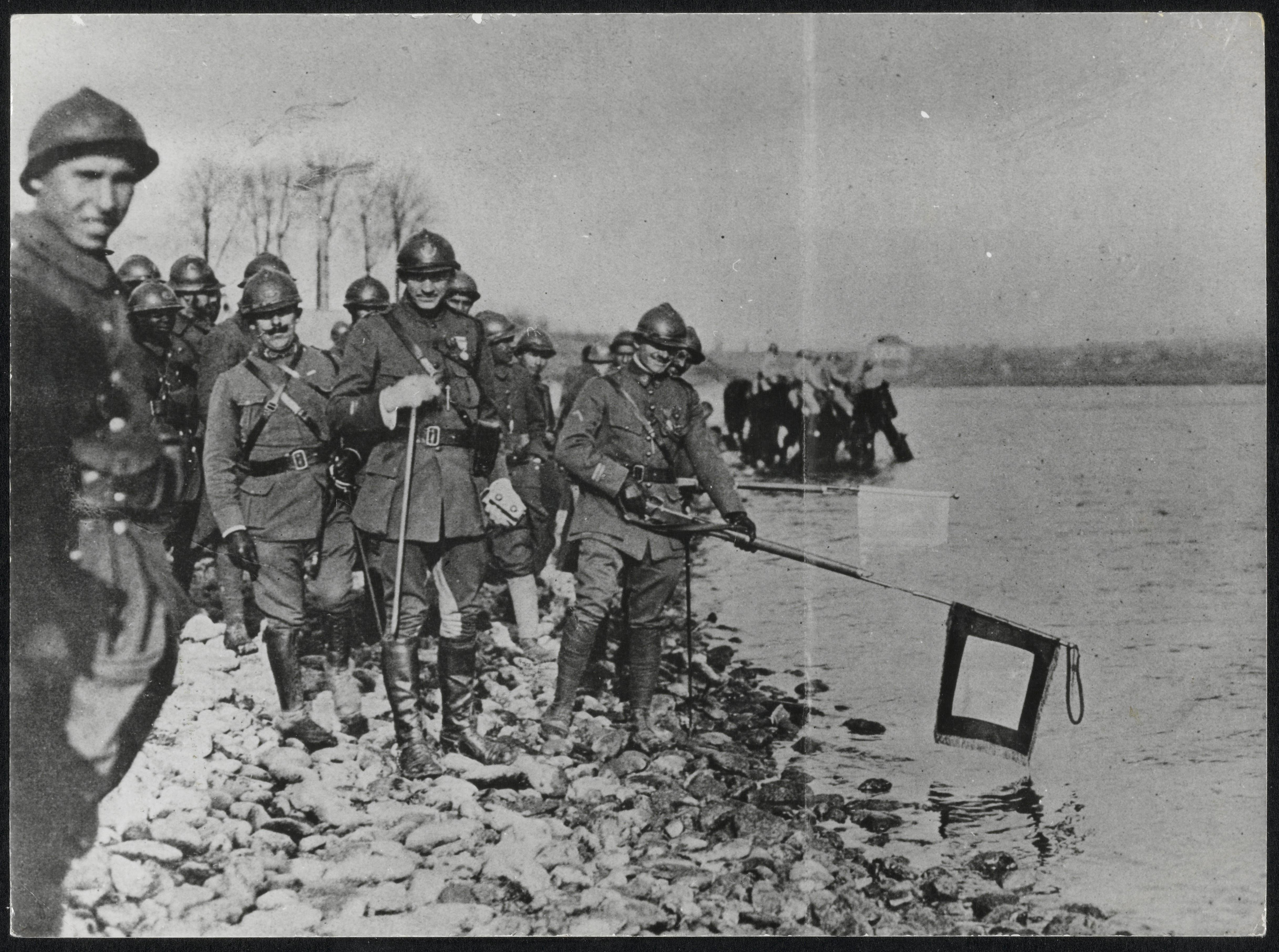
- Soldiers of the 2nd Moroccan Division dip their flag in the Rhine on 21 November 1918
- Active: 4 August 1918 – 25 March 1919
- Country: France
- Allegiance: France
- Branch: French Army
- Type: Infantry Division
- Role: Infantry
- Part of: French African Army
- Engagements: World War I: Second Battle of the Somme; Hundred Days Offensive

The 2nd Moroccan Division was an infantry division of the French African Army which took part in the First World War in 1918–1919.

== History ==
The 2nd Moroccan Division was created on 4 August 1918, following the dissolution of the 65th Infantry Division, and was commanded by General Louis Pierre M Antoine Modelon.

The division participated in the Second Battle of the Somme and advanced towards the Quennevières and Puisaleine farms. On 26 August, it advanced further towards Crécy-au-Mont, crossing the Ailette river and pushing towards the Hindenburg line until 5 September. It then took part in the End offensive and advanced into Germany after the Armistice, reaching the Rhine on 21 November 1918.

On 25 March 1919, the Division was disbanded.

== Composition ==
=== Infantry ===
- Régiment d'Infanterie Coloniale du Maroc (RICM)
- 2e régiment de tirailleurs marocains (2nd RMTM)
- 4th Tunisian Tirailleurs Regiment (transferred from the 1st Moroccan Division)

=== Other Units ===
- 255e régiment d'artillerie de campagne (artillery unit from the former 65th ID)
- 4e escadron of the 24e régiment de dragons
- 6e escadron of the 5e régiment de spahis algériens
- Engineer units from the former 65th ID
- Sanity and support units from the former 65th ID

== Sources ==
- Jean-Louis Larcade, Zouaves et tirailleurs, les régiments de marche et les régiments mixtes : 1914-1918, Argonautes, 2000
- Anthony Clayton, Histoire de l'Armée française en Afrique 1830-1962, Albin Michel, 1994.
- French Wikipedia.
