= 3rd Algerian Infantry Division =

- 3^{e} Division d'Infanterie Algérienne
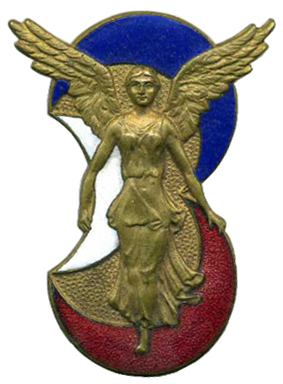
- The insignia of the 3^{e} DIA represents the winged statuette of the Victory of Cirta; Victoire de Cirta with three crescents
- Active: 1 May 1943 - 15 April 1946
- Country: France
- Type: Infantry Division
- Size: 16,840 personnel (1943): 40% Europeans; 60% Maghrebis
- Motto: It crescendo
- Engagements: Italian Campaign; Southern France; Vosges Mountains; Gambsheim Bridgehead; Bienwald; Baden

Commanders
- Notable commanders: Joseph de Goislard de Monsabert; Augustin Guillaume

The 3rd Algerian Infantry Division (French: 3^{e} Division d'Infanterie Algérienne, 3^{e} DIA) was an infantry division of the Army of Africa which participated in World War II.

Following the liberation of French North Africa, the division fought in Tunisia, Italy, metropolitan France and in Germany. As part of the French Expeditionary Corps led by the Marshal Alphonse Juin by landing in Provence, liberating Toulon and Marseille, fighting in the Vosges during the difficult battles for the liberation of Basse-sur-le-Rupt and Cornimont, and in Alsace as part of the French 1st Army under General Jean de Lattre de Tassigny.

== Creation and composition ==
- November 1942: French: Division de marche de Constantine created. This was a regiment de marche, a provisional unit, the size of a division, formed from the military district forces of the Army of Africa which were commanded from Constantine, Algeria.
- April 15, 1943: the 3rd Algerian Infantry Division was established by General of the French Army Henri Giraud under the orders of General Monsabert, with two infantry regiments with red fourragere, the 7^{e} RTA and 4^{e} RTT, one regiment with yellow fourragere, the 3^{e} RTA and 67^{e} RAA, similarly with yellow fourragere, 3 regimental colors decorated with the Légion d'honneur (3^{e} RTA, 4^{e} RTT and 7^{e} RTA).
- April 15, 1946: the division was disbanded.
- The 3rd Division was recreated on June 20, 2016 part of the Scorpion Force alongside the 1st Division.
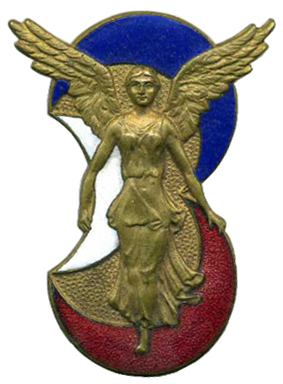
3^{e} DIA

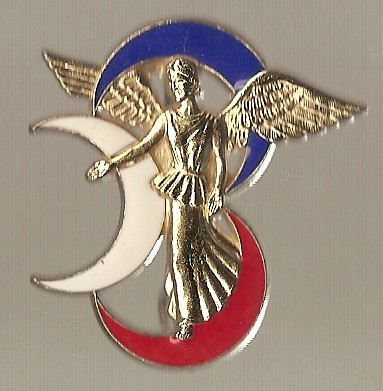
3^{e} DB

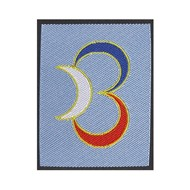
3^{e} BM

The 3^{e} DIA was also referred to as the Division of the Three Crescents (French: Division des Trois Croissants) representing the 3 Tirailleurs Regiments:

- 3rd Algerian Tirailleurs Regiment (French: 3^{e} Régiment de Tirailleurs Algériens, 3^{e} RTA)
- 4th Tunisian Tirailleurs Regiment (French: 4^{e} Régiment de Tirailleurs Tunisiens, 4^{e} RTT)
- 7th Algerian Tirailleurs Regiment (French: 7^{e} Régiment de Tirailleurs Algériens, 7^{e} RTA)

The 3^{e} DIA was awarded four citations at the orders of the armed forces between 1943 and 1945, along with the 1st Free French Division (1^{re} DFL), which also received four citations. The 3^{e} DIA was considered the most decorated division of the Second World War, with all forming regiments having been awarded a French Fourragere.

The 3rd Division is the modern successor of the 3rd Algerian Infantry Division. The 3rd Division was recreated in 2016 as part of the reorganization of the French Army.

=== Insignia & motto ===
The division insignia represents a winged statuette of the "Victory of Cirta" (French: une statuette ailée, la "Victoire de Cirta"), discovered in 1855 in Constantine (old Cirta in the province of Numidia), and is the representation of the Roman Goddess protector of the emperors and venerated by the Roman army.

The motto is "It crescendo," "It has grown."

== World War II ==
=== Tunisian campaign (1942-1943) ===
The 3rd Algerian Infantry Division has its origins in the Marching Division of Constantine of General Welvert.

=== Italian campaign ===
Created on May 1, 1943, in Constantine, Algeria and placed under orders of General Joseph de Goislard de Monsabert, the division disembarked in Italy in December 1943. The division was considered by General Joseph de Goislard de Monsabert and Alphonse Juin to be a successor of the Roman Legion of North Africa Legio III Augusta.

As part of the French Expeditionary Corps, commanded by the future Marshal Juin, the 3^{e} DIA captured Monte du Belvédère on January 25. While attracting the attention of the German forces, the division contributed to the success of the landing at Anzio, and the American advance on the heights of Cassino. As a result of this battle, the 4^{e} RTT suffered the loss of half of its strength.

In May 1944, the division made way to Monte-Cassino where Allied forces had already been engaged for several months. It participated in breaking through the Gustav Line by advancing into the mountains from the Garigliano River.

=== French & German campaign (1944-1945) ===
Troops of the 3rd Algerian Division move through Rochesson, France in November 1944

On August 15, 1944, the 3^{e} DIA disembarked in Provence, at Cogolin in the Var, liberated Toulon and Marseille, then made its way to the valley of the Rhône.

In September–October 1944, the division arrived in the Vosges region. On October 3, 1944, under the orders of Général Guillaume, the division mounted the assault between Moselle and Moselotte, advanced through Moselotte, the villages of Beaumont, Saulxures, and into the northern highlands. The division, then progressed towards Cornimont, turning back on October 15 at Tête des Cerfs, at the Piquante Pierre, at Rondfaing, at Chapechatte, all German counter-attacks. In 20 days, the 3^{e} DIA advanced more than 15 km while clearing the sectors of Belfort and Gérardmer.

Beginning of November 1944, the division was engaged in Le Haut du Tôt, Forge and Rochesson to cover the American U.S. Corps. Countering assaults, the division apprehended le Tholy, Château-Lambert, Col de Bussang, Col de Bramont and Col d'Oderen.

In December 1944, the division mounted the first assaults on Colmar, clearing the Col du Bonhomme, capturing Orbey and the highlands of Worhof which remained the capital of the Haut-Rhin, accordingly preparing the departure base, from which the French military liberated Alsace.

Beginning January 1945, the division was called to defend Strasbourg and pushed back one the final assaults on Kilstett.

On March 15, 1945, the division pierced through Oberhoffen-sur-Moder and captured Lauterborn. The division then crossed the Lauter and advanced into Germany. On March 31, 1945, at the head of the 1st Army, the division crossed the Rhine in the region of Spire. Reinforced by Moroccan Goumiers, the division overcame German resistance at Heuchelberg and Stromberg.

On April 16, the division led at Enz in the north, infiltrating by Nagold in the south and encircled Pforzheim.

The campaigns of Alsace and Germany ended with the 3^{e} DIA in Stuttgart.

On May 1, the division paraded in front of Général de Lattre de Tassigny.

When it was dissolved on April 15, 1946, the division was awarded four citations for outstanding performance.

== Composition ==
Disembarked in Italy in December 1943, the division had a strength of 16,840 men out of which 60% were Maghrebis and 40% Europeans.

=== Infantry ===
- 3rd Algerian Tirailleurs Regiment (French: 3^{e} Régiment de Tirailleurs Algériens, 3^{e} RTA) - Colonel de Linares, then Agostini and de la Boisse
- 4th Tunisian Tirailleurs Regiment (French: 4^{e} Régiment de Tirailleurs Tunisiens, 4^{e} RTT) - Colonel Roux then Guillebaud
- 7th Algerian Tirailleurs Regiment (French: 7^{e} Régiment de Tirailleurs Algériens, 7^{e} RTA) - Colonel Chapuis, replaced in March 1945 by the 49th Infantry Regiment

A North African Tirailleur regiment was composed of over 3,000 men (including 500 officers and sous-officers) and 200 vehicles. The proportion of troops that were Maghrebis reached 69% for the regiment, 74% for the battalion, 79% for the company fusiliers-voltigeurs, 52% for the anti-tank company and 36% for the infantry cannon company.

=== Armoured ===
- 3rd Algerian Spahi Regiment (French: 3^{e} Régiment de Spahis Algériens de Reconnaissance, 3^{e} RSAR) - colonel Bonjour
- 7th African Chasseur Regiment (French: 7^{e} Régiment de Chasseurs d'Afrique, 7^{e} RCA): - colonel Van Hecke.

The two regiments were composed of 900 to 1,000 men with 15% Maghrebis and 85% Europeans.

=== Artillery ===
- 67th African Artillery Regiment (French: 67^{e} Régiment d'Artillerie d'Afrique, 67^{e} RAA)
- 37^{e} group de FTA (French: forces terrestres antiaériennes).

One artillery regiment was composed of more than 2,000 men out of which 40% are Marghrebis.

=== Other units ===
- 83rd Engineer Battalion
- 3rd Medical Battalion
- 3rd Divisionary Repair Company (3^{e} CRD)
- Mixed Signals Company 83/84

== Decorations ==
The division was cited 4 times on the orders of the armed forces during the Second World War with its regiments awarded the fourragere with at least 2 citations.

- Fourragere with olive colors of the médaille militaire and Croix de Guerre 1939-1945 (4-5 citations at the orders of the armed forces)
  - 3rd Algerian Tirailleurs Regiment (4 citations)
  - 4th Tunisian Tirailleurs Regiment (4 citations)
- Fourragere with olive colors of the Croix de Guerre 1939-1945 (2-4 citations)
  - 7th Algerian Tirailleurs Regiment (3 citations)
  - 7th African Chasseur Regiment (3 citations)
  - 3rd Algerian Spahi Reconnaissance Regiment (3 citations)
  - 67th African Artillery Regiment (2 citations)
  - 83 Engineer Battalion (2 citations)

== Division Commanders ==
- November 1942 - April 1943: Général Marie-Joseph-Edmond Welvert, killed in action April 10, 1943. See fr:Édouard Welvert.
- May 1943 - September 1944: Général Joseph de Goislard de Monsabert
- September 1944 - October 1945: Général Augustin Guillaume

== Division Combat Casualties ==
During World War II, the total losses (« Morts pour la France ») suffered by the 3^{e} DIA between November 1942 and May 1945 were 3,078 men (2097 Marghrebis and 981 Europeans), almost 20% of the division. These do not include the 123 Frenchmen killed belonging to the FFI of the Franc Corps Pommiès/49th Infantry Regiment attached temporarily to the division between the end of November 1944 and May 1945:

Killed in Action	French	Maghrebis	Total
Tunisia Campaign (1942–43)	50	72	122
Italian Campaign (1943–44)	587	1,307	1,894
Campaign in Southern France (1944–45)	292	599	891
German campaign (1945)	52	119	171
Total (1942–1945)	981 (32%)	2,097 (68%)	3,078

== See also ==
- Moroccan Division
- Marching Regiment of the Foreign Legion
- French Expeditionary Corps (1943–1944)
- Days of Glory—a fictional film about the 7th Algerian Regiment
