= 8th Zouaves Regiment =

8^{e} Régiment de Zouaves
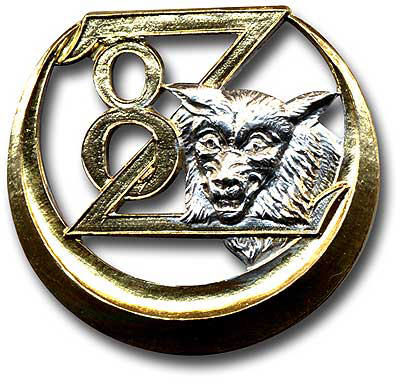
- Regimental insignia
- Active: 1914 - 1962
- Country: France
- Branch: French Army
- Type: Zouaves Regiment
- Motto: « Sans peur et sans reproche » (Fr)
- Engagements: World War I World War II; Algerian War
- Battle honours: Saint-Gond 1914; Artois 1915; Champagne 1915; Les Monts 1917; Verdun 1917; Battle of Soissons (1918); Vauxaillon 1918 - Third Battle of the Aisne

The 8th Zouaves Regiment (French: 8^{e} Régiment de Zouaves, 8^{e} R.Z) was an infantry unit of the French Army. Created in 1914, the unit was designated as 8th Marching Zouaves Regiment.

== Creation and different nominations ==
- 1914 : 8th Marching Zouaves Regiment
- 1920 : redesignated 8th Zouaves Regiment
- 1928 : dissolution
- 1934 : reconstituted
- 1940 : dissolution
- 1946 : recreated under designation 8th Zouaves Demi-Brigade
- 1956 : dissolution
- 1959 : creation of the 8th Zouaves Battalion from the 3rd Battalion of the 21st Infantry Regiment (French: 21^{e} Régiment d'infanterie)
- 1962 : dissolution

== History ==
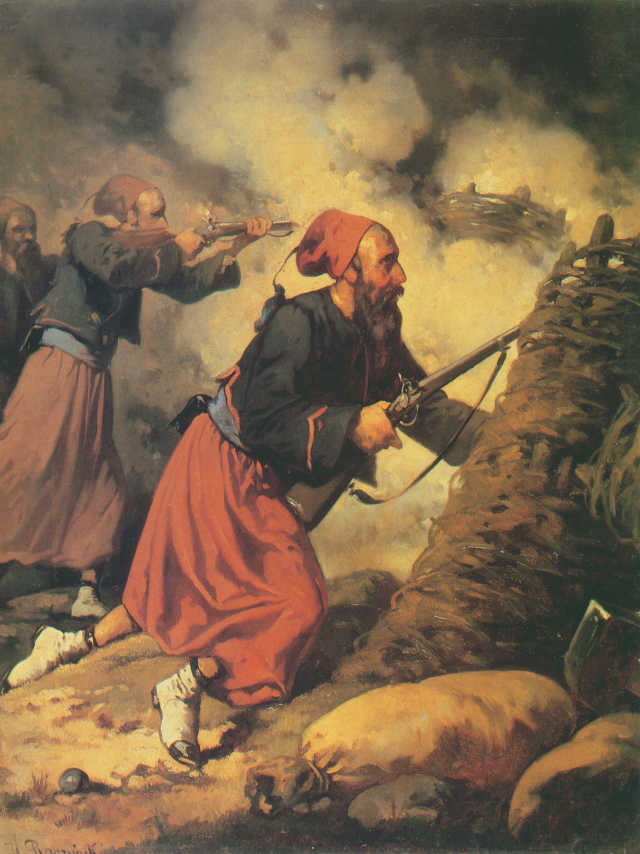
Zouaves 1858.

=== World War I ===
The 8th Zouaves Regiment disembarked from Bordeaux and Sète between 7 and 15 August 1914, consisting of three battalions (1st, 2nd, and 4th), the 3rd battalion belonging to a marching tirailleur regiment at the corps of the Moroccan Division. On 20 August they were in the region of Mézières - Charleville. In the following days, they heard the cannon of Charleroi. On 25 August, they crossed the border of Belgium, and that of Sugny, a small Belgian village, where they witnessed the burning of the villages of the Meuse and Semois. They welcomed the IX Corps and assumed the rearguard.

They engaged in combat at the corps of the Moroccan Division alongside the 4^{e} RTT, the 7^{e} RTA, and the RMLE.

==== 1914 ====
- Unfolding on the Marne
- Yser
- October 1914: the 8th Zouaves took form with the four respective battalions and designated "8".

==== 1915 ====
- In August 1915, the regimental colors were received. The regiment had three colonels throughout the war, lieutenants-colonel Modelon, Auronx and Lagarde. Lieutenant-colonel Modelon earned the regiment two palms and the fourragere with colors of the Croix de guerre 1914-1918. Under the command of Colonel Lagarde, the regiment conquered five palms, the fourragère with colors of the Médaille militaire, then the fourragère with colors of the Légion d'honneur. Conferred the Croix de Chevalier de la Légion d'Honneur to the regimental colors, the 8th Zouaves Regiment was cited seven times at the orders of the armed forces during the course of the war (1914-1918).
- Artois
- 25 September - 6 October: Second Battle of Champagne

==== 1916 ====
- Verdun 1916
- Somme

==== 1917 ====
- Verdun 1917

==== 1918 ====
- Verdun
- Villers-Bretonneux
- Soissons/Crise
- Chemin des Dames
- While only taking part, to life in the sector, the 8th Zouaves was in almost all the major action offensives of the war. The regiment was able to inscribe on the regimental colors: la Marne, Yser, Artois, Champagne, Somme, Moronvilliers, Verdun, Soissons, 18 July Chemin des Dames.

=== Interwar period ===
After 1919, the regiment was in Oran. It dissolved in 1928, the 2nd Zouave replaced the 8th Zouave. The regiment held garrison at Camp de Châlons in 1943. Accordingly, the regiment was motorised, the only regiment of Zouave in Metropole...

=== World War II ===
- In 1940 the 8th Zouaves, as part of the 12th Motorised Infantry Division (French: 12e division d'infanterie motorisée), fought at Dunkirk. On 2 June they came under heavy attack by infantry, artillery and stuka dive bombers at the canal de la Basse Colme. The canal formed an important part of the defensive perimeter around the evacuation of Dunkirk and its loss may have led to the end of the evacuation. The perimeter was held until the next day when two companies of the regiment were detached as a rearguard, expected to fight until killed or captured, and the remaining survivors crossed 4 kilometres (2.5 mi) of terrain under aerial and artillery attack to reach the beach to board the last boats to England.

=== Since 1945 ===
- Formed a Commando unit in Algeria
- Algeria 1956 - 1962
- At the cease-fire on 19 March 1962 in Algeria, the 8th Zouaves Regiment constituted along with 91 other regiments, the 114 units of the local force through the accords of Evians on 18 March 1962. The 8th Zouaves Regiment formed a local unit force of the Algerian order of battle, the 496°UFL-UFO composed of 10% metropolitan military and 90% Muslim military personnel, while being at the service of the executive provisionary power of Algeria until the independence of Algeria.

== Traditions ==
=== Decorations ===
The Regimental Color are decorated with:

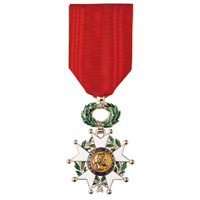
- Légion d'honneur
- Croix de guerre 1914-1918 with :
  - 7 palms and 1 silver star ,
- Ordre du Mérite Militaire Chérifien.
- Fourragere:
  - Fourragère with colors of Croix de guerre 1914-1918
  - Fourragère with colors of the Médaille militaire.
  - Fourragère with colors of the Légion d'honneur attributed to the regiment on 3 September 1918.
Fourragere with colors of the Croix de guerre 1914-1918

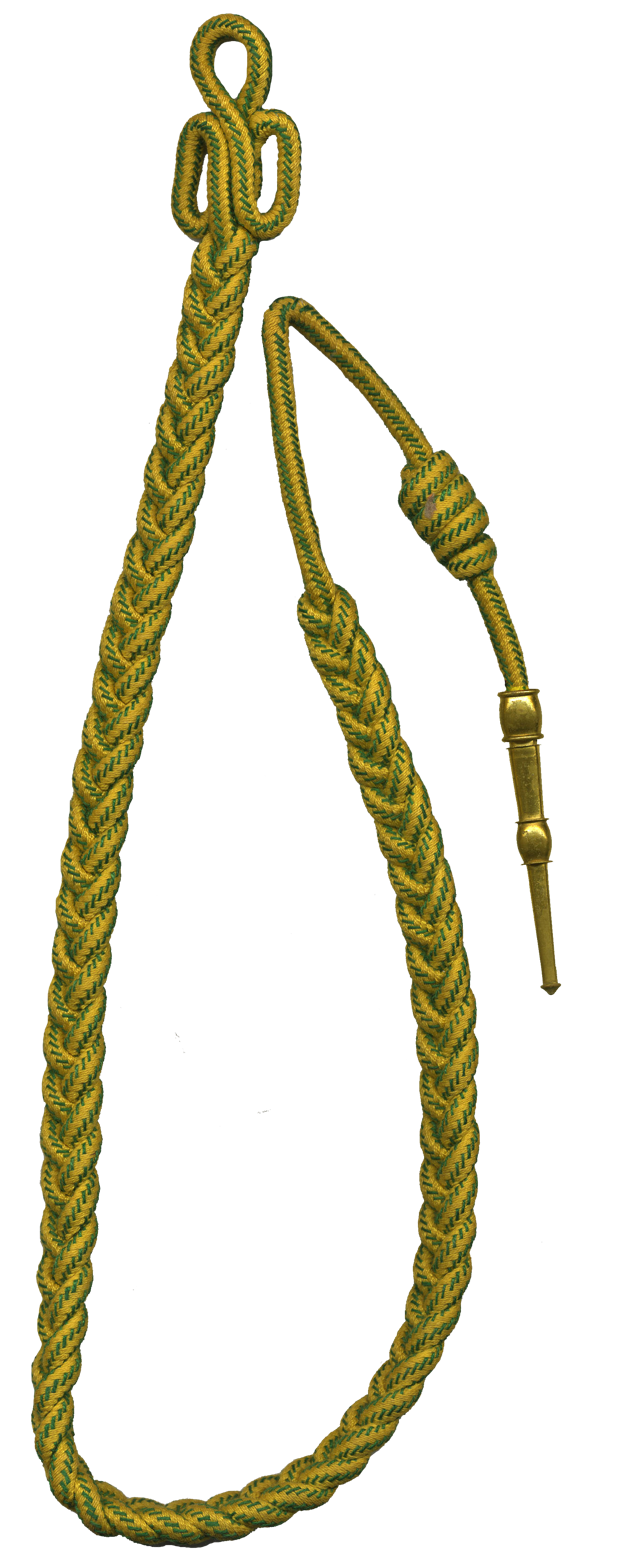
Fourragere with colors of the Médaille militaire

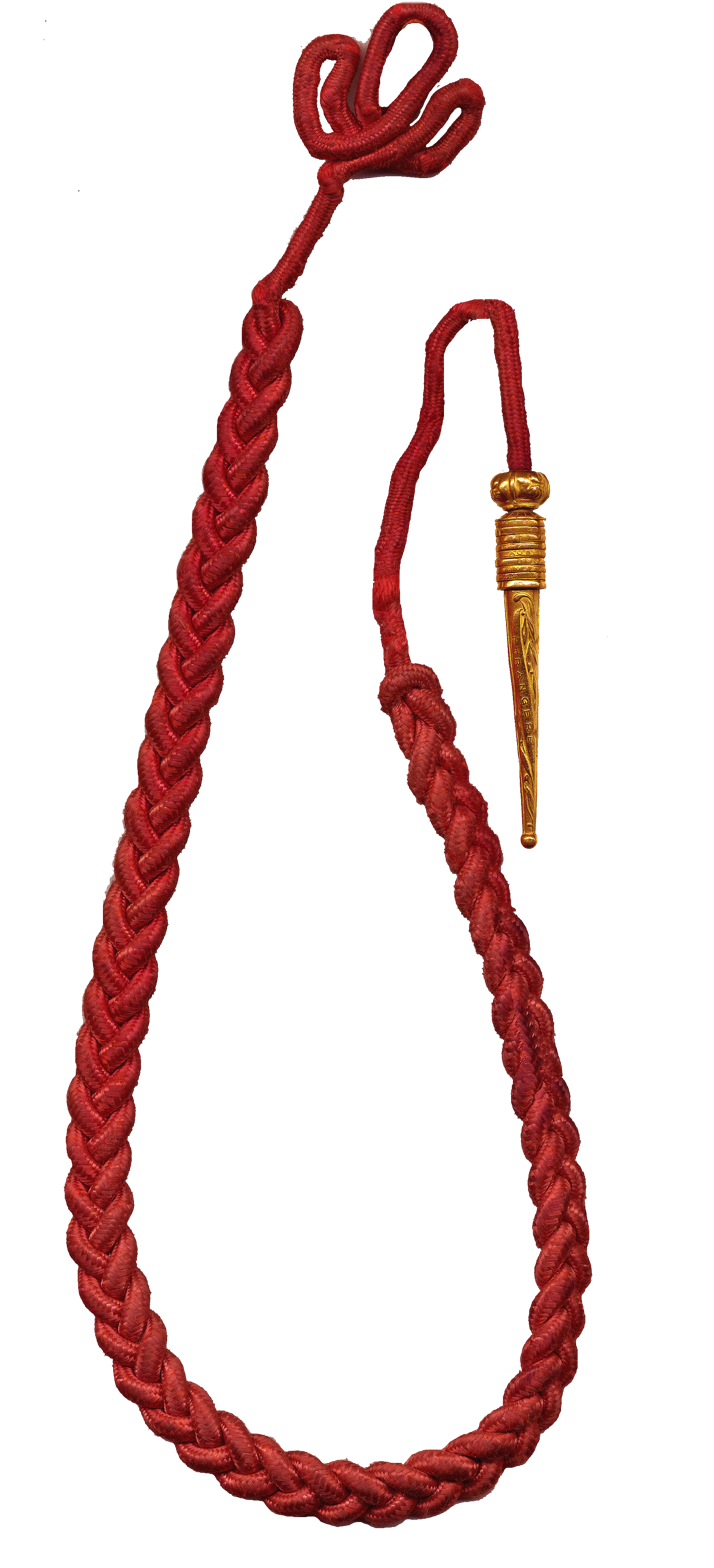
Fourragere with colors of the Légion d'honneur

=== Honours ===
==== Battle honours ====
- Saint-Gond 1914
- Artois 1915
- Champagne 1915
- Les Monts 1917
- Verdun 1917
- Soissonnais 1918
- Vauxaillon 1918

== Regimental Commanders ==
- 1914-1918
  - lieutenant-colonel Modelon
  - lieutenant-colonel Auroux
  - lieutenant-colonel Lagarde
- colonel Cloitre in the 1920s
- 1935 - 1937: Colonel Dame
- 1940
  - lieutenant-colonel Anzemberger
  - In 1956 Colonel Gaubillot and Commandant Bonamy

== Notable Officers & Zouaves ==
- Robert Jallet (1890-1945), served in the 8th Zouaves during World War I.
- Edgard Tupët-Thomé from October 1938 to 1940.

== See also ==
- 3rd Algerian Infantry Division
