= Demetz =

Demetz is a surname. Notable people with the surname include:

- André Demetz (1902–1977), French general
- Danielle De Metz (born 1938), French actress
- Frédéric-Auguste Demetz (1796–1873), French penal reformer and jurist
- Georges Demetz (1865–1942), French General
- Giustina Demetz (born 1941), Italian alpine skier
- Lisa Demetz (born 1989), Italian ski jumper
- Peter Demetz (1922–2024), American literature scholar of Germany
- Vincenzo Demetz (1911–1990), Italian cross-country skier
