= Roland de Mecquenem (soldier) =

- Born: 16 April 1914; Rabat, Morocco
- Died: 14 July 1992 (aged 78); Saint-Julien-de-Concelles, Loire-Atlantique, France
- Occupation: French Army officer
- Relatives: Roland de Mecquenem (uncle)

Roland de Mecquenem (16 April 1914 – 14 July 1992) was a French army officer who played an important role in the battle of Dien Bien Phu during the First Indochina War. He commanded the fifth battalion of the 7e Régiment de Tirailleurs Algériens (V/7 RTA).

During World War II, he participated in Operation Jedburgh.
