= Joseph de Goislard de Monsabert =

French general (1887–1981)

Joseph Jean de Goislard de Monsabert
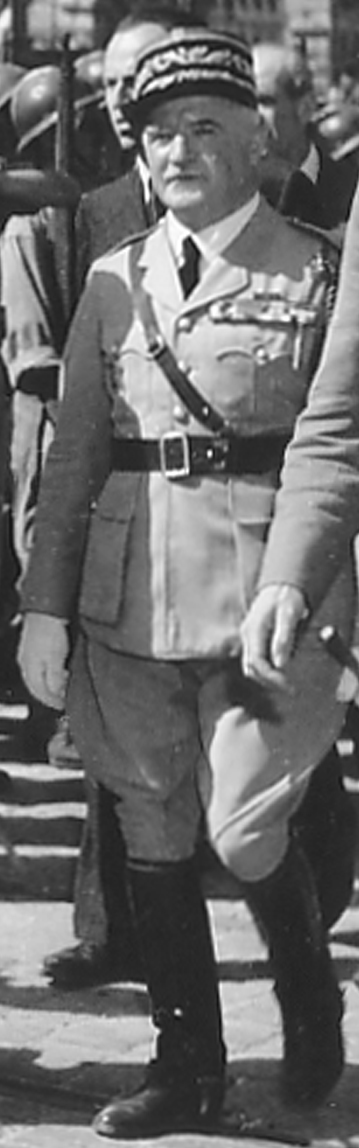
- Monsabert in 1944
- Born: 30 September 1887; Libourne
- Died: 13 June 1981 (aged 93); Dax, Landes
- Military career
- Allegiance: France
- Branch: French Army
- Service years: 1911–1946
- Rank: General
- Commands: 9th Algerian Tirailleurs; 81st Brigade; 81st African Division; Corps Francs d'Afrique; 3rd Algerian Infantry Division; II Corps; French Forces in Germany
- Conflicts: World War I World War II
- Awards: Grand Cross of the Légion d'honneur Companion of the Liberation; Médaille militaire Croix de guerre 1914–1918; Croix de guerre 1939–1945
- Other work: Politician

Joseph Jean de Goislard de Monsabert (Libourne 30 September 1887 – Dax, 13 June 1981), was a French general who served during the Second World War.

Monument to the memory of General Joseph de Goislard de Monsabert dedicated on 8 July 1985, in the Place des Martyrs de la Résistance, Bordeaux, France

Monsabert graduated from Saint-Cyr military academy and was commissioned as a lieutenant in 1911. He initially served with the 44th Infantry Regiment and then was moved to the 3rd Moroccan Rifle Regiment, with which he first saw combat in 1912. Assigned to the 1st Mixed Rifle and Zouaves Regiment and then the 9th Zouaves March Regiment in the First World War, he finished the war at the head of a battalion and as a holder of the Legion of Honor.

Promoted to colonel in 1937, he was made a brigadier in August 1941. This promotion was followed by promotion to major general in March 1943. He was promoted again to lieutenant general in August 1944, and then to general in September 1946.

Monsabert commanded first the Corps Francs d'Afrique and then the reserve elements of the XIX Corps (France) during the campaign for Tunisia.

Subsequently, he commanded the 3rd Algerian Infantry Division with the French Expeditionary Corps in the Italian campaign. On 3 July 1944 his forces liberated Siena. To an artillery officer who was complaining about the sheer number of valuable monuments that were cluttering the maps, he issued the instruction "tirez où vous voulez, mais si vous tirez en-deçà du XVIII^{eme} siècle, on vous fera fusiller!" (Fire where you wish, but if you fire on anything before the 18th century we'll get you shot!).

On 31 August 1944, Monsabert took command of the French II Corps of General Jean de Lattre de Tassigny's Army B, later renamed the French First Army. Monsabert led the II Corps with distinction for the remainder of the war in Europe. Monsabert, with about 130000 soldiers took Toulon and Marseille and played an active part in Alsace with a corps numbering nearly 150000 soldiers at that time. He then fought in Germany.

In July 1945, he was made the commander of French forces in Germany. In 1946, he retired from active military service. From 1951 until 1955, Monsabert served as a deputy in the Rassemblement du Peuple Français political party in the National Assembly of France, representing the region Pyrénées-Atlantiques.

== Decorations ==
- Grand Cross of the Légion d'honneur
- Companion of the Liberation (20 November 1944)
- Médaille militaire
- Croix de guerre 1914–1918 (7 citations)
- Croix de guerre 1939–1945 (5 citations)
- Croix de guerre des Théatres d'Opérations Exterieures (5 citations)
- Médaille coloniale with "Maroc" bar
- Military Cross (UK)
- Bronze Star Medal (US)
- Officer of the Legion of Merit (US)
- Grand Officer of the Order of Leopold (Belgium)
- Croix de Guerre 1914–1918 (Belgium)
- Croix de Guerre 1939–1945 (Luxembourg)
- Ordre du Mérite Militaire Chérifien (Morocco)
