= Augustin Guillaume =

French general (1895–1983)

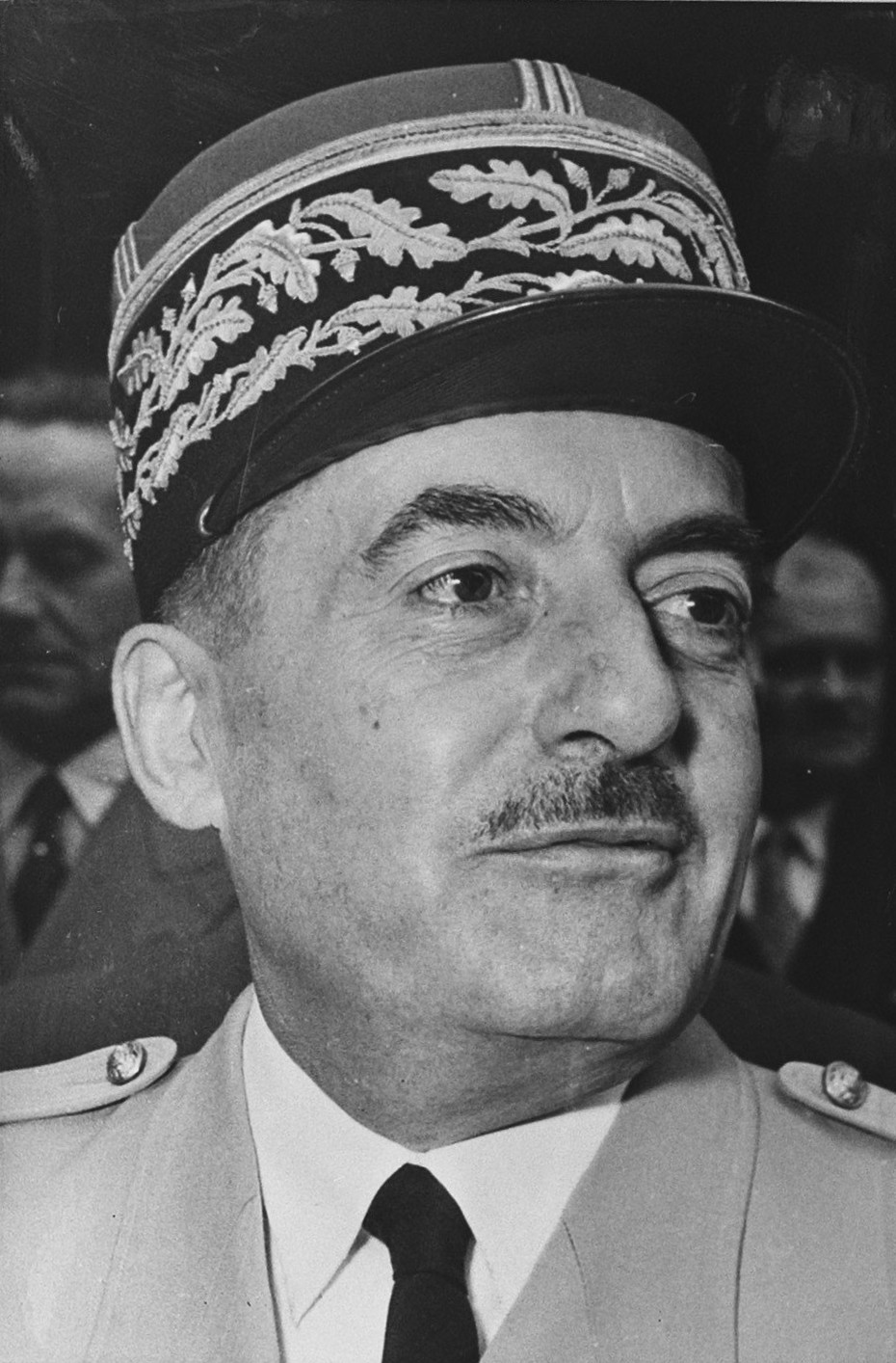
- Guillaume in 1953
- Born: Augustin Léon Guillaume; 30 July 1895; Guillestre, Hautes-Alpes, France
- Died: 9 March 1983 (aged 87); Guillestre, Hautes-Alpes, France
- Military career
- Allegiance: France
- Branch: French Army
- Service years: 1913–1956
- Rank: Général d'armée
- Commands: Moroccan Goumiers; 3rd Algerian Infantry Division; Chief of the Defence Staff; Chairman of the NATO Chief of Staffs' Committee
- Conflicts: World War I World War II: Operation Dragoon; Operation Nordwind
- Other work: Mayor of Guillestre (1959–1971)

Augustin Léon Guillaume (French pronunciation: [ɔɡystɛ̃ ɡijom]; 30 July 1895 – 9 March 1983) was a French general. He served in the French Army beginning in 1913, during World War I and World War II. From August 1951 to May 1954, he served as the Resident-General in French Morocco, and was responsible for the deposition and exile of Mohammed V. He ended his career as Chief of the Defence Staff and Chairman of the NATO Chief of Staffs' Committee from 1954–1956. He was born in Guillestre, Hautes-Alpes department, where he retired and served as the town's mayor. He died in Guillestre in 1983.

== Biography ==
Augustin Guillaume was born in Guillestre, where his father was a country doctor. Since childhood, he has been accustomed to hiking in the mountains. He would often cross the Italian border and learned Italian language, which he spoke without an accent, something that would prove useful during the Italian campaign (World War II).
