= François de Linares =

French general (1897–1956)

François Jean Antonin Gonzalez de Linarès
- Born: 7 July 1897; Guérande, Loire-Atlantique, France
- Died: 2 March 1956 (aged 58); Baden-Baden, Germany
- Occupation: Soldier
- Known for: World War II and Vietnam commands

François Jean Antonin Gonzalez de Linarès (7 July 1897 – 2 March 1956) was a French general who commanded forces in World War II under General Jean de Lattre de Tassigny and in Vietnam under General Raoul Salan.

== Early years ==
François Jean Antonin Gonzalez de Linarès was born in Guérande, Loire-Atlantique on 7 July 1897. During World War I (1914–18) he was conscripted as a private in the 93rd Infantry Regiment on 30 July 1916. He was promoted to corporal on 30 May 1917 and sergeant on 30 June 1917. He enlisted as a volunteer for an eight-year term on 9 August 1917 as a pupil at the École spéciale militaire de Saint-Cyr. He served in the 370th Infantry Regiment, the 70th Battalion of Chasseurs and the 26th Infantry Regiment. On 5 July 1918 he was promoted to second lieutenant.

== Inter-War period ==
de Linarès was admitted to Saint Cyr on 26 February 1919. In September 1919 he was assigned to service in Morocco. He fought in the Moroccan War from 1919 to 1922. He served in Algeria from 1930 to 1936. On the eve of World War II on 2 September 1939 he was assigned to the General Staff of the 3rd Army.

== World War II ==
On 27 October 1939, de Linarès was made commander of the 15th Battalion of Chasseurs Alpins. On 23 April 1940 he was assigned to the General Staff of the 2nd Army Group. He was promoted to lieutenant-colonel on 23 September 1942. He escaped from France on 24 November 1942. In March 1943 he was officially relieved of active duty and pensioned. He developed a clandestine organization for the escape of prisoners of war. In July 1943 he was a member of the French Military Mission in London. On 19 September 1943 he was appointed commander of the 3rd RTA. He was promoted to colonel on 25 March 1944. He participated in the campaign in Italy from December 1943 to August 1944. During this campaign he commanded the 3rd Regiment of Algerian Riflemen.

de Linarès landed in Provence on 17 August 1944 and participated in taking Toulon. On 15 September 1944 Linarès was named Deputy Chief of Staff of B Army, which became the First French Army under General de Lattre. He was appointed brigadier general on 25 November 1944. He was named Chief of Staff of the French First Army on 16 February 1945. He entered Germany on 29 March 1945. He became commander of the 2nd Moroccan Infantry Division on 14 April 1945, which he commanded in Austria when the war ended.

== Later career ==
In August 1945 de Linarès was made chairman of a committee to revise the regulations for infantry regiments. On 10 April 1946 he was appointed commander of the 2nd Infantry Division in Nancy. He was promoted to major-general as on 20 April 1948. On 6 March 1950 he was made commander of the 3rd Military Region. On 15 January 1951 he was given command of the French Forces in the Tonkin region of North Vietnam. He was appointed lieutenant-general as of 12 January 1951. He was given interim command of all forces in Indochina from July to September 1952 during the absence of General Raoul Salan. He left Vietnam on 23 May 1953. After taking leave he was appointed Inspector-General of Infantry on 2 September 1953. From 1 January 1954 until his death he was a full member of the Supreme Council of War. François de Linarès died in Baden-Baden on 2 March 1955.

== Publications ==
- Linares, François de (2005). Par les portes du Nord: la libération de Toulon et Marseille en 1944. Nouvelles Editions Latines. p. 427. ISBN 978-2-7233-2056-6.
- Linares, François de (2009). Campagne d'Italie, 1943-1944: Cassino, Rome, Sienne : l'affrontement des cinq armées. Lavauzelle. p. 503. ISBN 978-2-7025-1503-7.

== Sources ==
- "Général François de Linares". Commandos et Parachutistes Forum. Archived from the original on 2018-08-23.
- "Le Général Gonzalez de Linares". Forum de la guerre d'Indochine.
