= Georges Demetz =

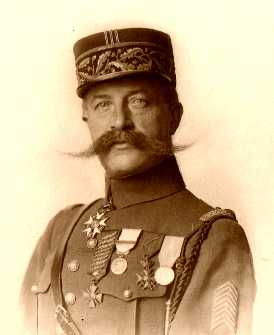
- General Demetz 1902
- Born: August 2, 1865; Saint-Fargeau, Yonne, France
- Died: December 3, 1942 (aged 77)
- Military career
- Conflicts: First World War (1914–1918); Occupation of the Rhineland (1918–1920)

Georges Demetz (2 August 1865 in Saint-Fargeau – 3 December 1942) was a French General who fought on the First World War.

He was appointed brigadier general in 1918, and divisional general in 1923.
