= French Expeditionary Corps (1943–44) =

French Expeditionary Corps during WWII

French Expeditionary Corps (FEC)
- Corps Expéditionnaire Français (CEF)
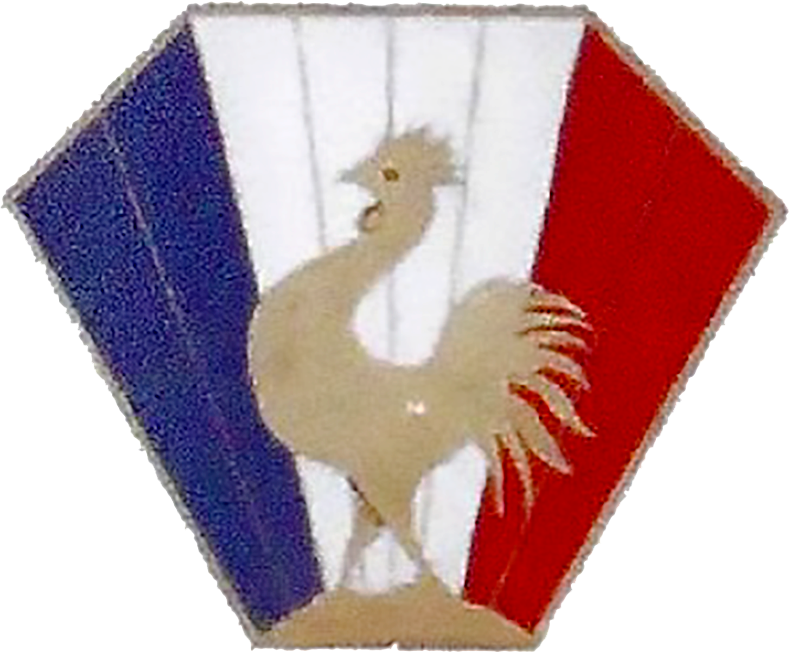
- Shoulder sleeve insignia
- Active: 1943–1944
- Country: France; French Colonial Empire
- Branch: French Liberation Army
- Type: Army
- Size: 112,000 men (4 divisions)
- Engagements: World War II; Italian campaign

Commanders
- Notable commanders: General Alphonse Juin

The French Expeditionary Corps (FEC) (French: Corps Expéditionnaire Français, CEF), also known as the French Expeditionary Corps in Italy (FECI) (French: Corps Expéditionaire Français en Italie, CEFI), was an expeditionary force of the French Liberation Army formed in 1943. The corps participated in the Italian Campaign of World War II under the command of General Alphonse Juin. Comprising approximately 112,000 men organized into four divisions, the force was largely made up of colonial units drawn from the Army of Africa, with Moroccan and Algerian troops led by French officers; overall, colonial personnel constituted about 60% of its strength.

The corps demonstrated considerable operational mobility, advancing across mountainous terrain during its engagements. However, its record was also marked by numerous incidents of rape, murder, and looting against the local Italian population. In August 1944, the corps was withdrawn from Italy and its units were incorporated into the French First Army under General Jean de Lattre de Tassigny in preparation for the invasion of Southern France.

== Background and Formation ==
Following the Allied landings in Algiers during Operation Torch in 1942, the colonial troops of the French Army of Africa, previously under the command of Vichy France, came under the authority of the Free French Forces. General Charles de Gaulle, leader of the French government in exile, utilised these forces to establish the French Expeditionary Corps (CEF). The corps was composed of approximately 112,000 personnel, organised into four divisions, with two-thirds of its troops originating from North Africa, primarily Moroccans, Algerians and Senegalese, and the remaining third consisting of French settlers.

Many of the African troops had been raised in the Atlas Mountains of North Africa and were among the few Allied units specifically trained and equipped for mountain warfare. The CEF included specialised Moroccan units known as goumiers, irregular troops recruited from the Rif Mountains, who were organised into battalions called "tabors," often composed of soldiers with tribal or familial ties. The total number of Moroccan Goumiers within the corps was 7,833.

The broader French North African units comprised both volunteer and conscripted indigenous soldiers, known as tirailleurs, who were recruited based on tribal, ethnic or regional affiliations. Additionally, the corps included foreign soldiers enlisted through the French Foreign Legion, a force known for incorporating non-French personnel into its ranks.

The CEF was equipped primarily with Allied-supplied weaponry, including the Thompson submachine gun (.45 calibre) and the Browning machine gun (12.7 mm). Moroccan troops also carried traditional curved daggers known as koummya, which were emblematic of their heritage.

== Order of battle ==
The campaign was under the command of Lieutenant General Mark W. Clark of the U.S. Fifth Army. The commander of the corps was General Alphonse Juin, future Maréchal de France, Juin was himself a pied-noir from Bone in Algeria who had commanded Arabs and Berbers much of his life. He was assisted by General Marcel Carpentier.

Other notable officers were General Joseph de Goislard de Monsabert (3rd DIA), General François Sevez, General André-Marie-François Dody and General Diego Brosset. General Augustin Guillaume was in command of the three Moroccan tabors (similar in size to a large battalion).

=== 1st Free French Division ===
Also known as: 1st Motorized Infantry Division.

(General Diego Brosset), arrived in Italy in April 1944

- 1st Brigade (13th Foreign Legion Demi-Brigade and 22nd Bataillon de marche Nord Africain
- 2nd Brigade (4th, 5th and 11th Bataillon de Marche)
- 4th Brigade (21st, 24th Bataillon de Marche and Bataillon d'Infanterie de Marine du Pacifique(BIMP))
- 1st Regiment d'Artillerie Coloniale(RAC)
- 1st Regiment de Fusiliers Marins (RFM)

=== 2nd Moroccan Infantry Division ===
(General André Dody), arrived in Italy end of November 1943

- 4th Regiment de Tirailleurs Marocains (RTM)
- 5th Regiment de Tirailleurs Marocains (RTM)
- 8th Regiment de Tirailleurs Marocains (RTM)
- 3rd Regiment de Spahis Marocains (RSM)
- 63rd Regiment d'Artillerie d'Afrique (RAA)

=== 3rd Algerian Infantry Division ===
(General Joseph de Goislard de Monsabert), arrived in Italy in December 1943

- 3rd Regiment de Tirailleurs Algériens (RTA)
- 4th Regiment de Tirailleurs Tunisiens (RTT)
- 7th Regiment de Tirailleurs Algériens (RTA)
- 3rd Regiment de Spahis Algériens de Reconnaissance (RSAR)
- 67th Regiment d'Artillerie d'Afrique (RAA)

=== 4th Moroccan Mountain Division ===
(General François Sevez), arrived in Italy in February 1944

- 1st Regiment de Tirailleurs Marocains (RTM)
- 2nd Regiment de Tirailleurs Marocains (RTM)
- 6th Regiment de Tirailleurs Marocains (RTM)
- 4th Regiment de Spahis Marocains (RSM)
- 69th Regiment d'Artillerie de Montagne (RAM)

=== General Reserves ===
- Command of Moroccan Goumiers (General Augustin Guillaume)
  - 1st Groupe de Tabors Marocains (GTM)
  - 3rd Groupe de Tabors Marocains (GTM)
  - 4th Groupe de Tabors Marocains (GTM)
- 7th Régiment de Chasseurs d'Afrique (RCA)
- 8th Régiment de Chasseurs d'Afrique (RCA)
- 64th Regiment d'Artillerie d'Afrique (RAA)

=== Anti-Aircraft Artillery Troops ===
(Brigadier general Aaron Bradshaw Jr., U.S.A.)

== First and fourth battle of Monte Cassino ==
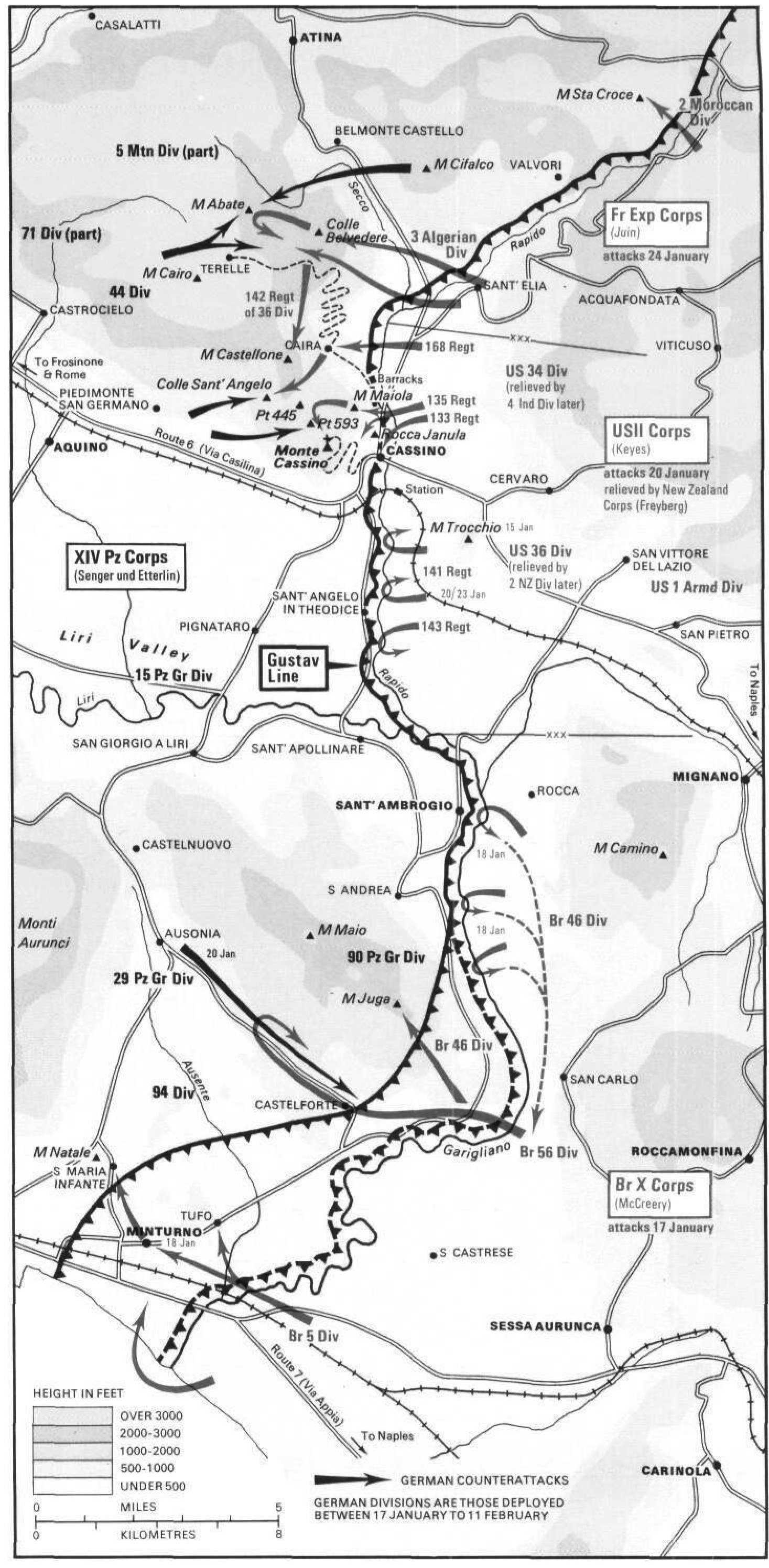
Gustav Line at Cassino, early 1944

The first of the FEC troops at the front was the 2nd Moroccan Division with the 4th GTM attached, in January the 3rd Algerian Division joined the Moroccans. It was positioned in the high mountains at the extreme right of the U.S. Fifth Army. Used to mountain fighting, the FEC pushed back the German 5th Mountain Division taking Monte Belvedere and Colle Abate but stopped before being able to take Monte Cifalco after suffering heavy casualties and lacking reinforcements. The Allied command decided to settle down to reinforce and reorganise for a spring campaign code-named Diadem set for May 11. New units were added: The 1st French Motorized Division, the 4th Moroccan Mountain Division, as well as another group of Tabors, the 1st GTM.

In the next two battles, much smaller affairs on a narrow front around Cassino town, the corps was not involved. For the fourth and final battle the Fifth Army's front had been compressed towards the coast to allow the British Eighth Army's XIII Corps and II Polish Corps to join the line. During this battle, launched 11 May 1944, the Corps attacked into the inhospitable Aurunci Mountains which the Germans had considered impassable by modern infantry. The progress made by the corps and in particular the lightly loaded goumiers, capturing Monte Maio and pushing deep into the Aurunci, threatened the flanks of the German forces on their right in the Liri valley fighting against XIII Corps. The Germans were consequently forced to withdraw allowing XIII Corps to advance up the Liri valley and the Polish Corps on the right to occupy on 18 May the heights of Monte Cassino and the abbey reduced to rubble on top of it.

== Breaking of the Gustav Line ==
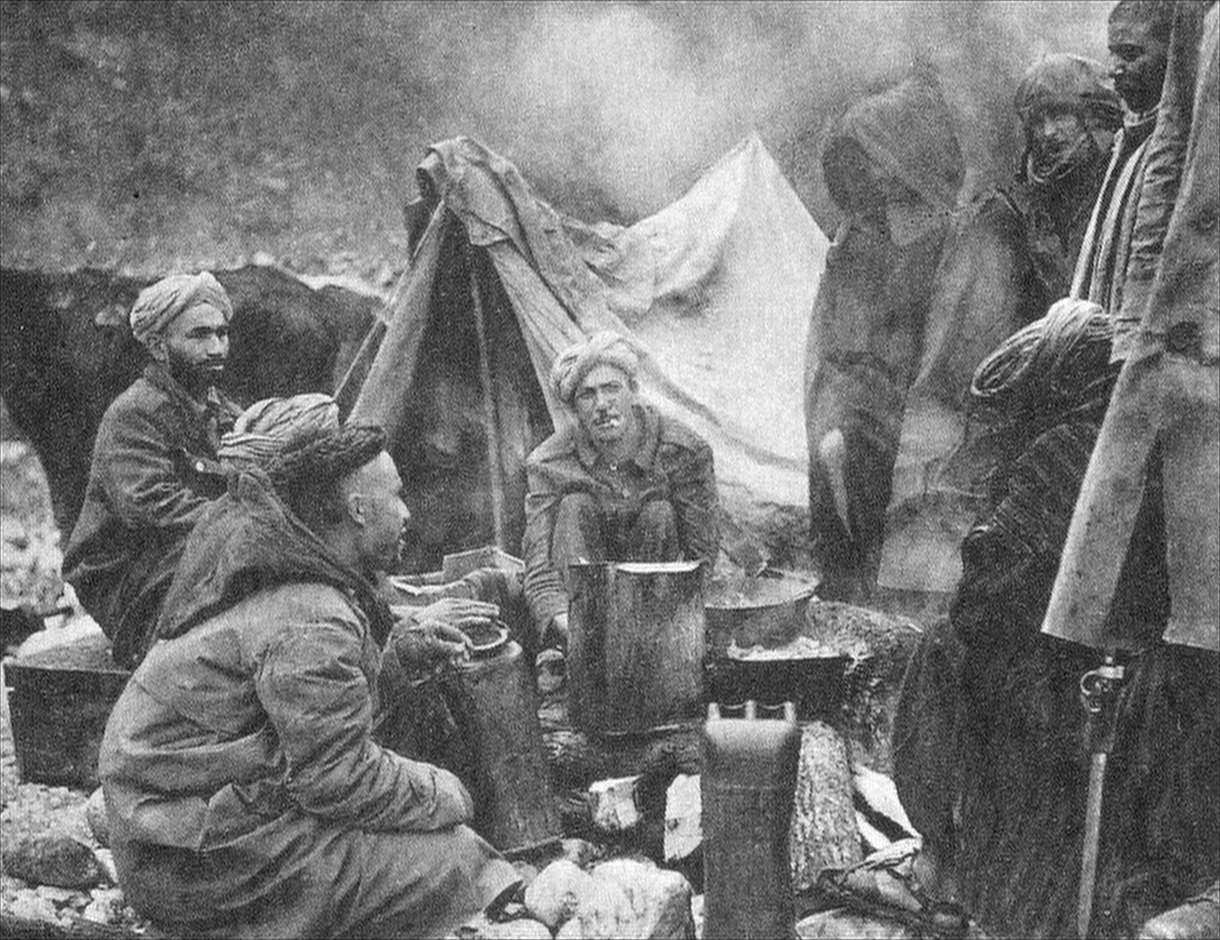
Moroccan goumiers at Monte Cassino

In his autobiography, Mark W. Clark describes how the FEC broke through the Gustav Line in May 1944.

Meantime, the French forces had crossed the Garigliano (River) and moved forward into the mountainous terrain lying south of the Liri River. It was not easy. As always, the German veterans reacted strongly and there was bitter fighting. The French surprised the enemy and quickly seized key terrain including Mounts Faito Cerasola and high ground near Castelforte. The 1st Motorized Division helped the 2nd Moroccan division take key Mount Girofano and then advanced rapidly north to S. Apollinare and S. Ambrogio In spite of the stiffening enemy resistance, the 2nd Moroccan Division penetrated the Gustav Line in less than two days' fighting. The next 48 hours on the French front were decisive. The knife-wielding Goumiers swarmed over the hills, particularly at night, and General Juin's entire force showed an aggressiveness hour after hour that the Germans could not withstand. Cerasola, San Giogrio, Mt. D'Oro, Ausonia and Esperia were seized in one of the most brilliant and daring advances of the war in Italy, and by May 16 the French Expeditionary Corps had thrust forward some ten miles on their left flank to Mount Revole, with the remainder of their front slanting back somewhat to keep contact with the British 8th Army. For this performance, which was to be a key to the success of the entire drive on Rome, I shall always be a grateful admirer of General Juin and his magnificent FEC... The 8th Army's delay made Juin's task more difficult because he was moving forward so rapidly that his right flank---adjacent to the British---constantly was exposed to counter-attacks.

The battle for the Gustav Line had been difficult for the FEC. It had been involved in violent combat in the mountains. Then, while Clark entered Rome, the FEC attacked the east of the city securing the road to Siena and capturing it. After the campaign, the soldiers were withdrawn to Africa to join the Army B that had landed in southern France after Operation Dragoon.

== Casualties ==
The casualties for the campaign were approximately 6,500 killed in action, 2,000 missing and 23,000 wounded. The combatants of the C.E.F. rest in the French military cemeteries of Monte Mario (Rome) and Venafro.

== Triumph and disgrace ==
=== Praised from Allied military leaders ===
In a letter to Marechal Juin, General Mark Clark paid tribute to the Tirailleur units and Goumiers of the CEF :

For me, it has been a deep source of satisfaction to see how the vital part played by the French troops of the Fifth Army throughout our Italian campaign against the common enemy has been universally acknowledged. During these long months, I have had the real privilege of seeing for myself the evidence of the outstanding calibre of the French soldiers, heirs of the noblest traditions of the French Army. Nevertheless, not satisfied with this, you and all your people have added a new epic chapter to the history of France; you have gladdened the hearts of your compatriots, giving them comfort and hope as they languish under the heavy and humiliating yoke of a hated invader. . . . With my deepest gratitude for the tremendous contribution that you have made to our joint victories, my dear General.

=== Reports of rape and looting ===
At the height of their reputation as the best mountain fighters in the Allied camp, soon came reports of extensive violence by the French forces, most notably during the advance on Rome, when the Moroccan Goumiers went on a rampage of rape and looting. When reports reached the Fifth Army headquarters about women and children being violated, goods looted, money stolen and even murder, General Clark was appalled. He contacted Juin who immediately ordered that the offenders be caught and summarily punished. Analysis of French military archives suggests that some 360 Expeditionary Corps soldiers were brought before the military courts for violent crimes committed against thousands of civilians during the Italian campaign; some were executed, the rest imprisoned.

These crimes tarnished the honour of the French army in Italy and horrified Juin and the rest of the French command. The French officers punished with equal brutality, shooting and sometimes hanging the offenders. 207 more soldiers were found guilty of sexual violence. The horrors even came to the attention of the Vatican, Pope Pius XII personally objecting to the further use of the tribesmen in Europe. In an audience granted to General de Gaulle, the pope complained about the rape and pillage. As a result of the discussion, the proposed participation of the Moroccan Goums in Operation Dragoon was canceled before being reinstated under pressure from General de Lattre.

According to Italian sources, more than 7,000 people were raped by Goumiers. A monument was erected in remembrance of the Marocchinate women in Castro dei Volsci. In 2015, the Italian state organised compensation to the victims still alive.

== See also ==
- Army of Africa
- Liberation of France
- Marocchinate
- Moroccan Goumier
