= Army of Africa (France) =

Term for portions of French Army in French North Africa

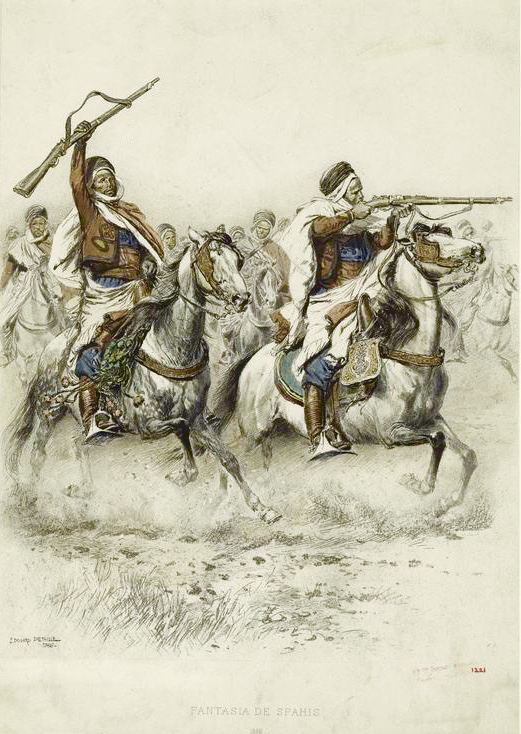
1886 illustration of Algerian spahis of the Army of Africa

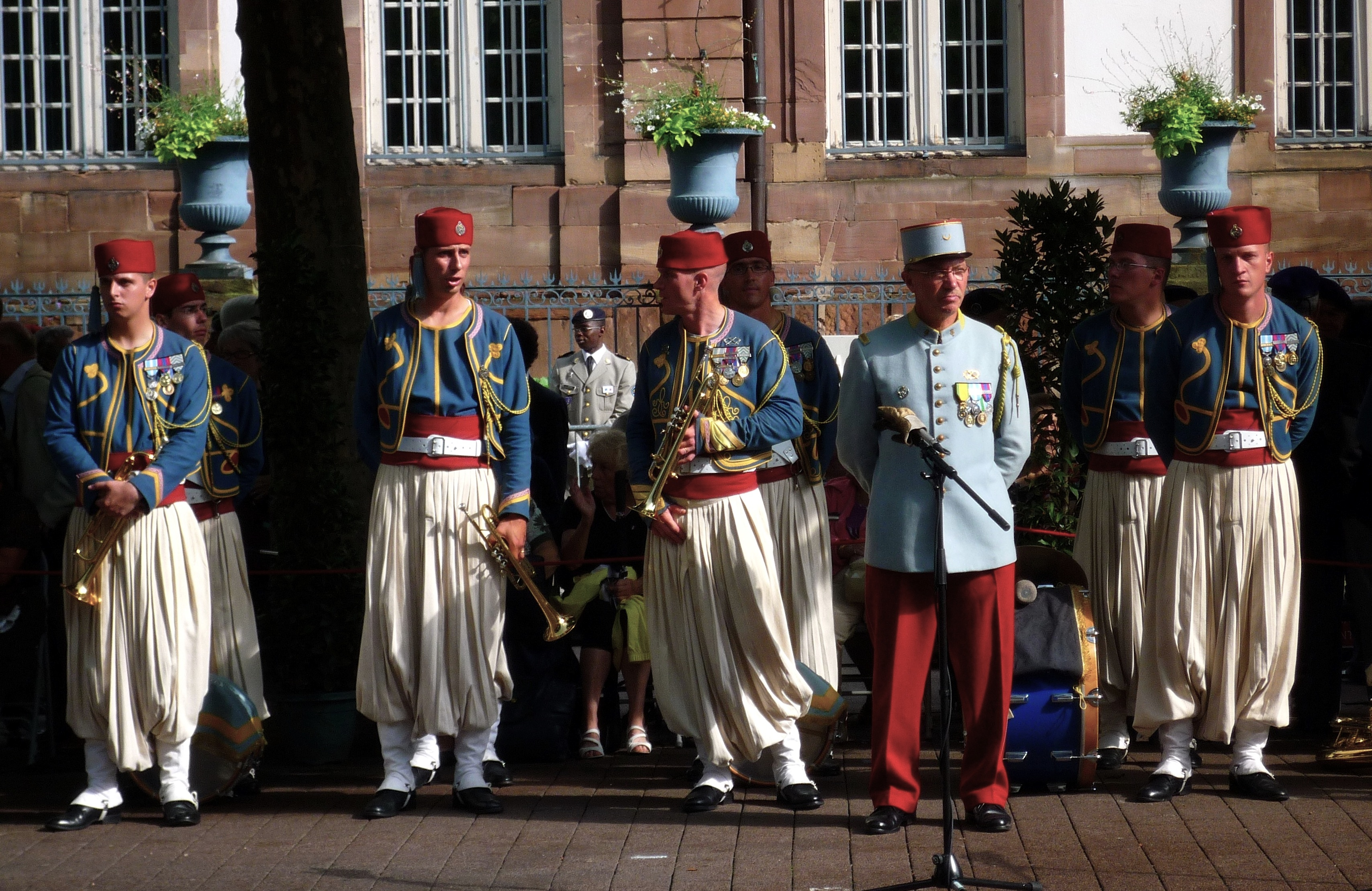
Soldiers of the modern 1st Tirailleur regiment of Épinal wearing the historic uniform of this branch of the Army of Africa.

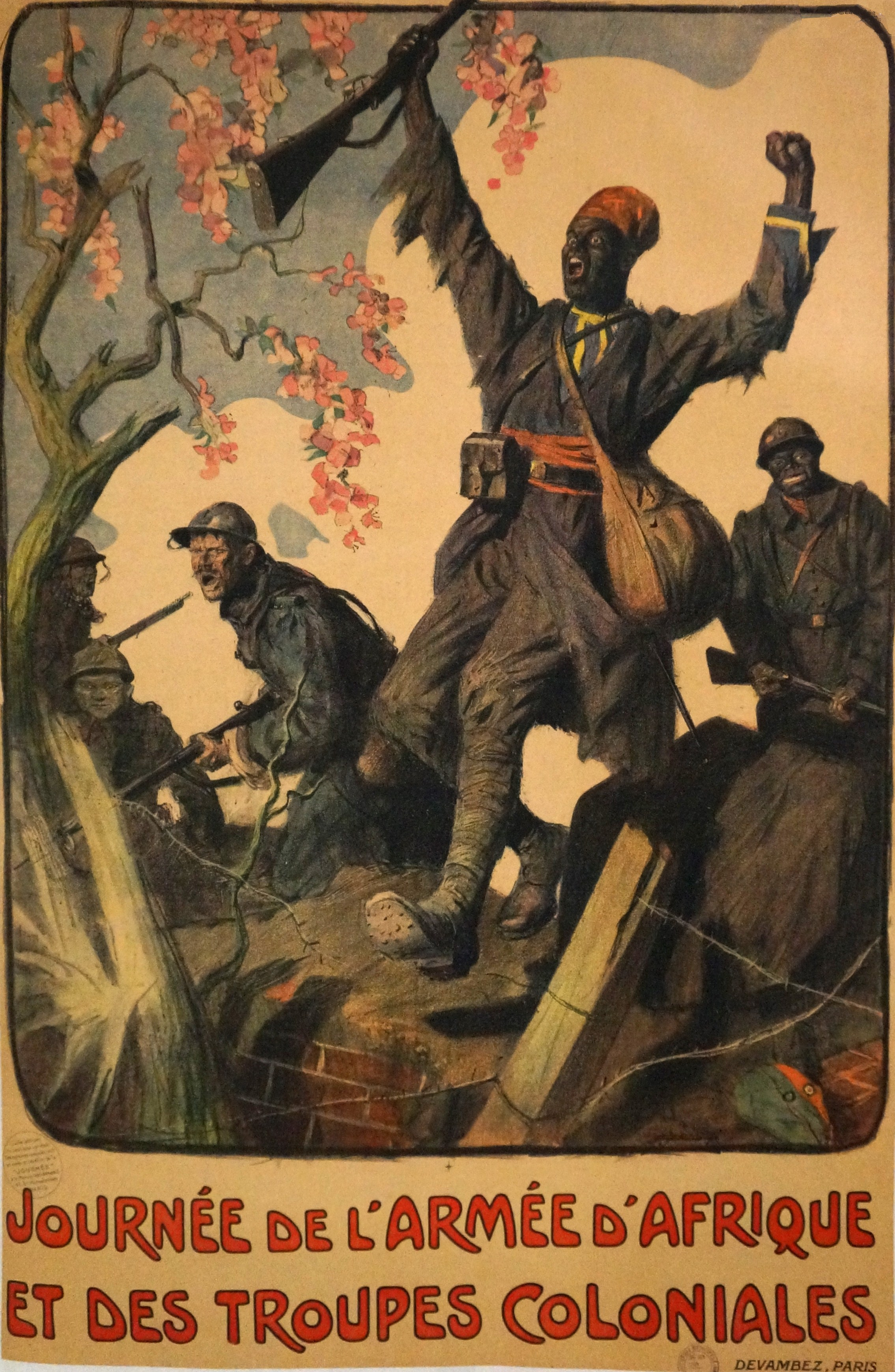
Soldiers of the Army of Africa and the separate Colonial Army. A World War I French propaganda poster

The Army of Africa (French: Armée d’Afrique [aʁme d‿afʁik]) was an unofficial but commonly used term for those portions of the French Army stationed in French North Africa (Morocco, Algeria and Tunisia) from 1830 until the end of the Algerian War in 1962, including units made up of indigenous recruits.

== Composition ==
The Army of Africa included indigenous Arab or Berber volunteers; (spahis, Goumiers and tirailleurs); regiments largely made up of pied-noir French settlers doing their military service (zouaves and Chasseurs d'Afrique); and non-French volunteers of the French Foreign Legion. The divisions were not absolute and (for example) volunteers or conscripts from mainland France might choose to serve with the Muslim rank and file of the spahis and tirailleurs, while Arab volunteers might appear amongst the ranks of the zouaves. Prior to World War I, one battalion of each of the four zouave regiments then in existence, was recruited in France. These battalions' bases were thereby providing a framework that could be expanded in the event of general mobilisation, and which were physically located closer to the geographical threat of Germany.

In addition to the corps listed above, the Army of Africa included technical and support branches - notably artillery, engineers and train. Stationed permanently in North Africa these comprised a mixture of French and indigenous personnel that varied according to recruitment availability.

In May 1913 a limited form of selective conscription was applied to the Muslim population of Algeria. In theory, from this date, all young Muslim males were called to undertake three years of compulsory military service upon reaching the age of 18. However only about 2,000 conscripts a year were obtained by this method, out of approximately 45,000 possible candidates and Muslim enlistment remained predominately voluntary in peacetime. Even during World War I the majority (89,000 out of 170,000) of Muslim soldiers who served were volunteers. As in France itself, military service was an obligation of citizenship and all physically fit male settlers of French origin were required to undertake two years of compulsory service (three years from 1913).

Officers of all branches of the Army of Africa were predominantly French Europeans, though a certain number of commissioned positions up to and including the rank of captain were reserved for Muslim personnel in the spahis and tirailleurs. In 1932 the proportion of officiers indigènes was fixed at nine out of a total of 67 in each of these regiments.

In 1956, in the course of the Algerian War, a new policy of greater racial integration was adopted in the remaining units of the old Army of Africa. Algerian tirailleur regiments were to be made up of roughly 50% "Frenchmen of North African stock" (i.e. Arab and Berber Muslims) and an equivalent number of French volunteers and conscripts, largely drawn from the European settler community. At the same time, additional Muslim soldiers were to be incorporated into previously mostly European units such as the zouaves, until they made up to 25% of the total. Growing tensions within mixed units as the war continued, plus the threat of rebel FLN reprisals against Muslim volunteers, largely nullified this attempted reform. Towards the end of the period of French rule in 1959 the personnel breakdown of a typical regiment of tirailleurs Algerien had stabilised at about 60% Muslim and European volunteers, enlisted under contract (engagés); plus 20% European and 20% Muslim conscripts (appelés).

== Formal status ==
The Armée d’Afrique was formally part of the French metropolitan army comprising a separate army corps. It is noted that in 1873 the term Armée d'Afrique was used with reference to the troops of the 19th Army Corps (19^{e} Corps d'Armée). It was one of 21 army corps of the Metropolitan Army formed in 1870. It was the only corps whose military district did not cover mainland France. As such it was separate from the French Colonial Forces which came under the Ministry of Marine and comprised both French and indigenous units serving in Sub-Saharan Africa and elsewhere in the French colonial empire.

== African Light Infantry ==
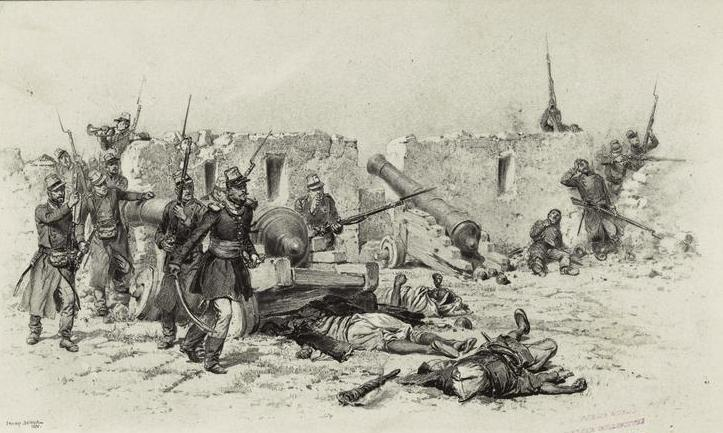
An illustration of troops of the Infanterie Légère d'Afrique storming a fortification in 1833

The battalions of Infanterie Légère d'Afrique (African Light Infantry) were penal units made up of convicted military criminals from all branches of the French Army, who had finished their sentences in military prisons but still had time to serve before their terms of engagement were completed. The preference was not to return them to their original units where they might undermine discipline or brutalise their fellow soldiers.

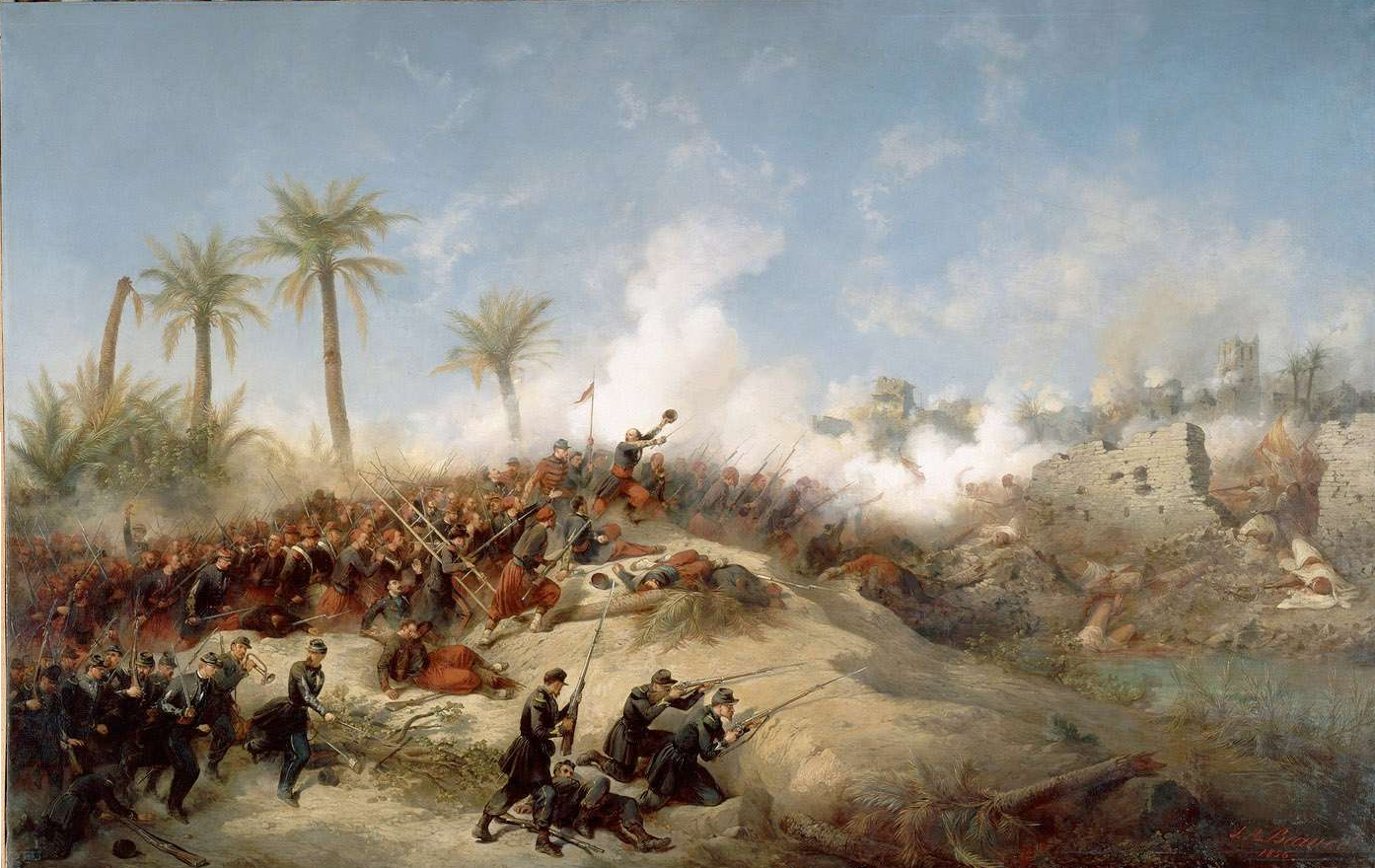
The Assault on Zaatcha by Jean-Adolphe Beaucé, 1855

The first two battalions of the Infanterie Légère d'Afrique were raised in 1832 for service in Algeria. Ironically known as les Joyeux (the "merry ones") these units were generally used for road and other construction work under harsh discipline. They were however used for combat service when circumstances demanded in Africa, Indochina and in France itself during World War I. Three battalions sent to France at the outbreak of World War II to work on fortifications, were rearmed in April 1940 and saw active service prior to the Fall of France.

Officers of the African Light Infantry were seconded from other regiments as were some non-commissioned officers. Many NCOs were however former "Joyeux" who chose to remain with these unusual units and exercise authority, after they had completed their original terms of service.

== Desert troops ==
Camel mounted Meharistes plus Compagnies Sahariennes (desert infantry and later mechanised troops) were maintained in the Sahara. The Foreign Legion provided mule mounted detachments for service in southern Algeria and, from 1940 to 1962, four of the Compagnies Sahariennes.

In addition to the above, units or individuals from the mainland French Army were sometimes posted to service in North Africa, as were detachments of the Gendarmerie and the Tirailleurs Senegalais.

== World War I ==
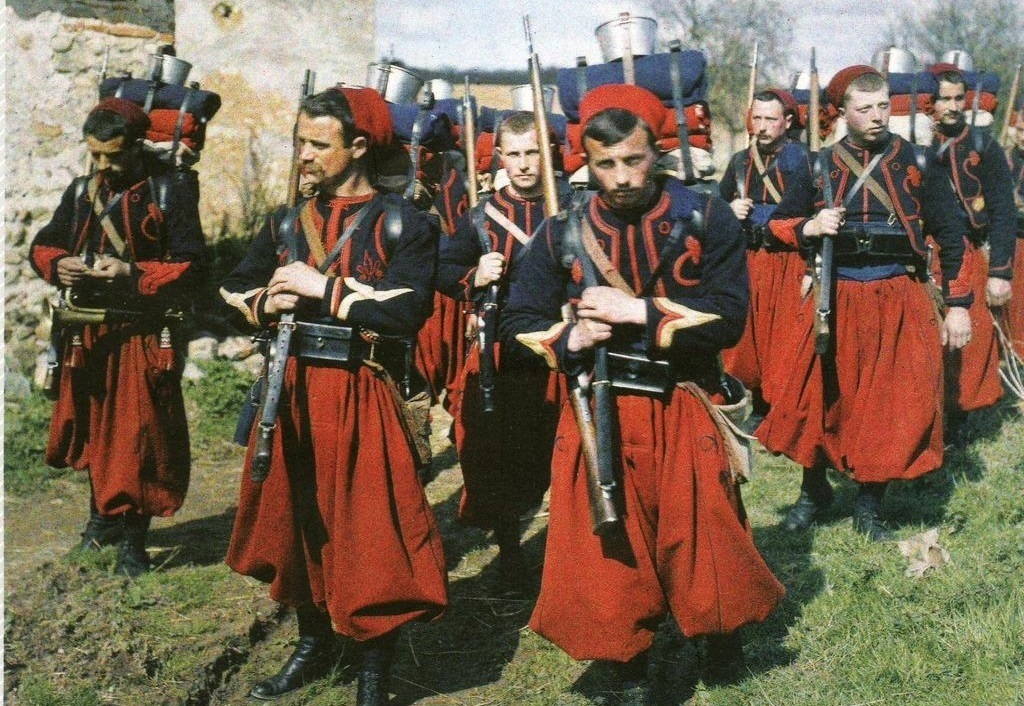
Early colour photograph of the French 3rd Zouaves in 1912

At the outbreak of war in August 1914, the Army of Africa in Algeria and Tunisia comprised nine regiments of Algerian Tirailleurs, four of zouaves, six of Chasseurs d'Afrique, four of spahis and two of the Foreign Legion. Large numbers of these troops were sent immediately to serve in France, mainly drawn from the peacetime garrisons of Algeria and Tunisia. (Note: 'In August 1914, the 19th région militaire sent three infantry divisions to France - the (37th, the 38th, the 45th)')

On 22 April 1915 the first German use of chlorine gas on the Western Front was directed against the positions at Ypres occupied by the 45th Infantry Division, consisting of zouaves and Algerian tirailleurs.

In Morocco nineteen battalions of tirailleurs and nine of zouaves were on active service, along with elements of the Foreign Legion and the African Light Infantry. The Moroccan Division was one of the most decorated units of the French Army in World War I and all its regiments were distinguished by unit citations mentioned in despatches of the armed forces at the end of the conflict. The Moroccan Division was the only division to receive the battle honour of being decorated with the légion d'honneur throughout the course of World War I.

In 1914 33,000 Muslim Algerians were already serving with the spahis, tirailleurs and other units of the Army of Africa. In the course of the war a further 137,000 enlisted either as volunteers (57,000) or as wartime conscripts (80,000). Of the total of 170,000, 36,000 were killed.

== World War II ==
As had been the case in 1914, substantial numbers of the Army of Africa were moved to mainland France on the outbreak of World War II. In May 1940 14 regiments of zouaves, 42 regiments of Algerian, Tunisian and Moroccan tirailleurs, 12 regiments and demi-brigades of the Foreign Legion and 13 battalions of African Light Infantry were serving on all fronts.

Following the fall of France, the Army of Africa was reduced to a level of 120,000 under Axis direction. General Maxime Weygand was however able to maintain and train a further 60,000 men in French North Africa disguised as auxiliary police, "provisional conscripts" and "unarmed workers".

From the end of 1942, the Army of Africa was headed by French general Henri Giraud and fought in the Tunisia Campaign before its merger with General Charles de Gaulle's Free French Forces. North African units subsequently played a major role in the liberation of Corsica (September – October 1943) and the Italian Campaign (1943–44) in the French Expeditionary Corps. During the French and German campaigns of 1944–45 the Army of Africa was expanded to 260,000 men (including 50% indigenous and 50% white French settlers in North Africa, Pied-Noir), including the 1st Motorized Infantry Division (Zouaves and Foreign Legion), the 1st Armoured Division (Chasseurs d'Afrique and Foreign Legion), the 2nd and 4th Moroccan Infantry Divisions (Moroccan Tirailleurs), and the 3rd Algerian Infantry Division (Algerian and Tunisian Tirailleurs). In addition three groupes de tabors marocains of Goumiers served as independent units while artillery, engineer, commando, reconnaissance (mechanised Spahis and tank destroyer units were drawn from the French and indigenous populations of French North Africa).

== Indo-China and Algerian Wars ==
The Oran, Algiers and Constantine Divisions existed as divisions until at least 1955–57; General de division Raymond Delange commanded the Algiers Division in 1955–57, also being assistant commander of the 10th Military Region. During the Algerian War they were upgraded to corps status.

The Armée d’Afrique continued to provide a substantial portion of the French Army between 1945 and 1962. The Foreign Legion and volunteers from the Moroccan, Algerian and Tunisian tirailleur regiments served in the Indochina War between 1946 and 1954, along with nine tabors of the Moroccan Goumiers. Four regiments of Moroccan and Algerian spahis fought as infantry or halftrack armoured units.

With Moroccan and Tunisian independence in 1956, the Muslim personnel of the tirailleur and spahi units recruited in both countries were incorporated into their new national armies. This reduced the Army of Africa to the all professional Foreign Legion; the colon (French settler) conscripts and reservists of the zouaves and Chasseurs d'Afrique; and the career regulars and conscripts of the remaining Muslim units recruited in Algeria. In contrast to the war in Indo-China, the Algerian War of 1954–62 was fought largely by conscripts and reservists from France itself.

== Post-Algerian War ==
With the exception of a reduced Foreign Legion and one regiment of Spahis, all regiments of the Armée d’Afrique were disbanded or lost their former identity between 1960 and 1965. A small unit of the Infanterie Légère d'Afrique was maintained in French Somaliland until that Territory became independent in 1977. However, one regiment each of Chasseurs d'Afrique, Tirailleurs and artillery (68^{e} Régiment d'Artillerie d'Afrique) have been re-established to maintain the traditions of their respective branches. In addition some units of engineers (31^{e} régiment du génie), signals (41^{e} régiment de transmissions) and transport (511^{e} régiment du train) have been accorded ties of tradition with the old Armée d’Afrique. These appear however to be arbitrary linkages which do not reflect any real regimental continuity.

== Uniforms ==
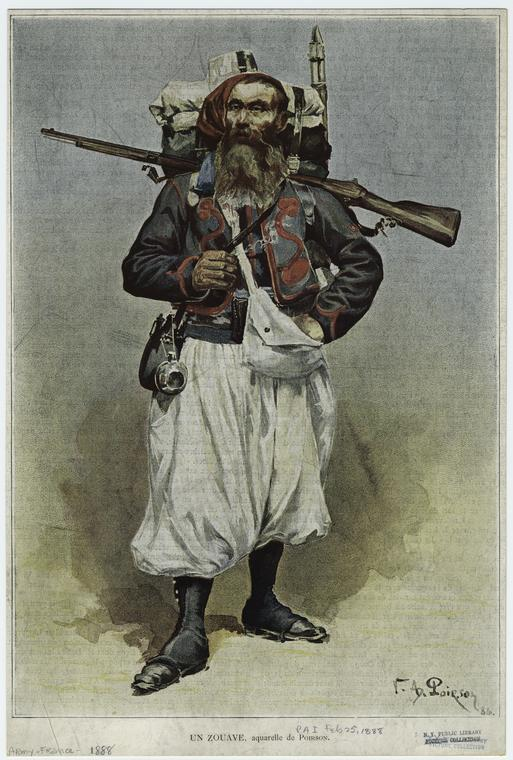
A zouave in 1888, wearing "tenue orientale" with white summer trousers instead of the usual red.

The uniforms of the various branches making up the Army of Africa ranged from the spectacular "tenue orientale" of the spahis, tirailleurs and zouaves to the ordinary French military dress of the chasseurs d'Afrique, Foreign Legion, Artillerie d'Afrique and Infanterie Légère d'Afrique. Even the latter units were however distinguished by details such as sashes, white kepi covers and (for the chasseurs) fezzes which made them stand out from the remainder of the French Army. Some of these features have survived as parade dress to the present day; notably the white cloaks and red sashes worn by the 1st Spahis, and the white kepis, fringed epaulettes and blue sashes of the Foreign Legion. The fanfare-nouba (regimental band) of the 1st Regiment of Tirailleurs still wears the full traditional tenue orientale; comprising white turbans, light blue zouave style jackets braided in yellow, red sashes and wide light blue or white Moorish trousers (see colour photograph above). The adoption of khaki uniforms, unlike the rest of the army who wore horizon blue was decided upon early during the First World War.

== Units ==
=== European units ===
- Zouaves
- Chasseurs d'Afrique
- French Foreign Legion
- Battalions of Light Infantry of Africa

=== Indigenous units ===
- Tirailleurs
- Spahis
- Moroccan Goumier
- Méharistes

== See also ==
- French colonial flags
- French Colonial Empire
- List of French possessions and colonies

== Sources ==
- Clayton, Anthony (1988). France, Soldiers and Africa. Washington: Brassey's Inc. ISBN 978-0-08-034748-6.
- Clayton, Anthony (1994). Histoire de l'Armée française en Afrique 1830-1962 (in French). Paris: Albin Michel. ISBN 978-2-28-600869-7.
- Keegan, John (1998). The First World War. London: Hutchinson. ISBN 0-09-180178-8.
- Larcade, Jean-Louis (2000). Zouaves et Tirailleurs: les régiments de marche et les régiments mixtes (1914-1918), Vol I. Livet, Normandie: Editions des Argonautes. ISBN 2-95-151710-6.
- Larcade, Jean-Louis (2001). Zouaves et Tirailleurs: les régiments de marche et les régiments mixtes (1914-1918), Vol II. Livet, Normandie: Editions des Argonautes. ISBN 2-95-151711-4.
- Huré, Robert, ed. (1977). L'Armée d'Afrique : 1830-1962. Paris: Charles-Lavauzelle. OCLC 757208988.
- Lormier, Dominique (2006). C'est nous les Africains. Paris: Calmann-Lévy. ISBN 978-2-70-213649-2.
- Mirouze, Laurent (2007). The French Army in the First World War Volume I - to battle 1914. Vienna: Verlag Militaria. ISBN 2-9515171-0-6.
- Les Africains, Historama, hors-série No. 10, 1970
