= Moroccan Division (France) =

1st Moroccan Division or Moroccan Division (1^{re} Division Marocaine)
- Active: August 1914 – January 1927
- Country: French Third Republic
- Allegiance: France
- Branch: French Army
- Type: Infantry Division
- Role: Infantry
- Mottos: Sans Peur Sans Pitié (Fr) بلا خوف ولا شفقة (Ar) (Topping a crescent equally in French and Arabic, Moroccan Division Memorial) "Without Fear without Pity" (Eng)
- Engagements: World War I; 1914 – Bataille de la Fosse-à-l'Eau (French: Bataille de la Fosse-à-l'Eau); 1914 – First Battle of the Marne (Bataille des Marais de Saint-Gond) (French: Bataille des Marais de Saint-Gond); 1915 – Bataille de l'Artois; 1915 – 2^{e} Bataille de Champagne; 1916 – Bataille de la Somme; 1917 – Bataille des monts de Champagne; 1917 – Bataille de Verdun; 1918 – Bataille de l'Aisne; 1918 – Offensive des Cent-Jours (Bataille de Vauxaillon) (French: Bataille de Vauxaillon)

Insignia
- Marching Division of Morocco: Division de Marche du Maroc (D.M du Maroc)
- 1st Moroccan Division: Division Marocaine; 1^{re} Division Marocaine (D.M, 1^{re} D.M)

The Moroccan Division (French: Division marocaine, 1^{re} D.M) or the 1st Moroccan Division of 1914, initially the Marching Division of Morocco (French: « Division de Marche du Maroc »D.M du Maroc) was an infantry division of France's Army of Africa (French: Armée d'Afrique) which participated in World War I.

Moroccan Division was a division made up primarily of white French colonial troops who had been sent to police Morocco, rather than soldiers from Morocco. The Moroccan Division illustrated capability in the First Battle of the Marne in September and the Second Battle of Artois of May 1915 where for the first time, a French division pierced the front.

The Moroccan Division was one of the most decorated units of the French Army and all its regiments were cited at the orders of the armed forces at the end of the conflict. The Moroccan Division was the only division of all French regimental colours to be decorated with the légion d’honneur throughout the course of World War I.

The four principal units which composed formation of the Moroccan Division between 1914 and 1918 were the Marching Regiment of the Foreign Legion RMLE, the 4th Marching Tirailleurs Regiment 4^{e} RTT, the 7th Marching Tirailleurs Regiment 7^{e} RTA and 8th Marching Zouaves Regiment 8^{e} RZ, all awarded the French fourragere with colours of the légion d’honneur at the end of the conflict.

== Creation and different nominations ==
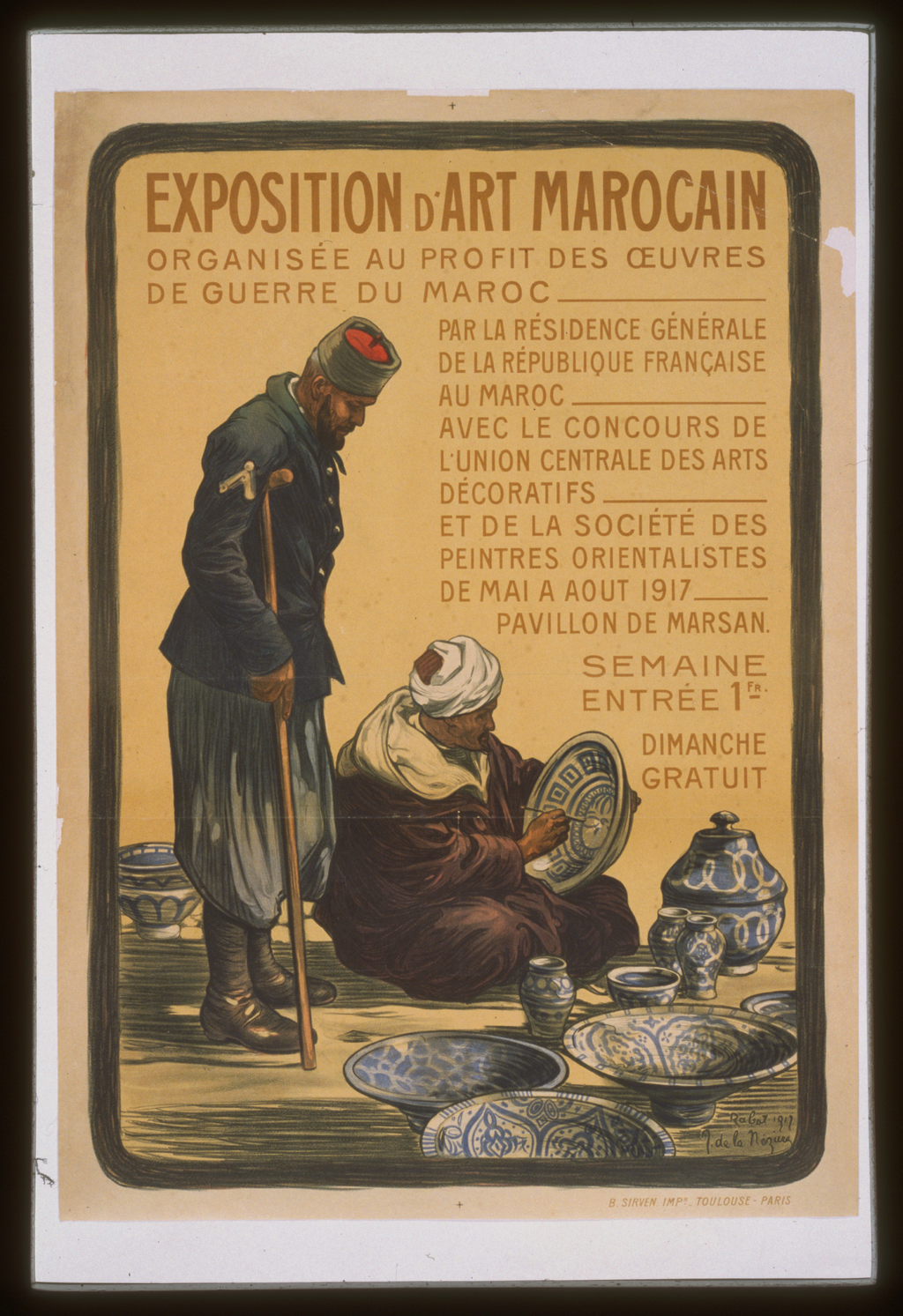
A 1917 poster advertising an art exposition for the benefit of wounded Moroccan soldiers serving in the French Army.

On the eve of mobilisation on August 2, 1914, the troops which were at the disposition of the French Army in Morocco constituted:

- 1st Colonial Infantry Battalion (French: 1^{er} Bataillon d'Infanterie Colonial, 1^{er} B.I.C. du Maroc) of Morocco at Fez
- 6 Mixed Colonial Infantry Regiments of Morocco composed each of 1 colonial battalion (French: « marsouins ») and 2 Senegalese Tirailleurs (French: « Tirailleurs Sénégalais ») at Rabat, La-Chaouïa, Meknés, Fez et Marrakech.
- 2 Mixed Artillery Colonial Groups (one group of 3 (French: « Batteries Montées de 75 de Campagne ») and the other of 4 (French: « Batteries de 65 de Montagne »))
- 6 companies of Senegalese scouts
- 13 battalions of Algerian Tirailleurs
- 9 battalions of Tunisian Tirailleurs
- 9 battalions of Zouaves
- 5 battalions of Moroccan Trailleurs
- 1 squadron of Senegalese Spahi

While at disposition, these part forces were made immediately available to Général Hubert Lyautey who created since mobilisation in Morocco, the Marching Division of Morocco (French: « Division de Marche du Maroc ») (future Moroccan Division, « Division Marocaine » ), with mainly 3 battalions (6th, 7th, 9th Colonial Infantry Battalions of Morocco) regrouped at Bled-el-Makhzen which formed the Colonial Infantry Marching Regiment of Morocco ( future « R.I.C.M » in 1956) of the 1st Marching Brigade of Morocco (French: « 1^{re} Brigade de Marche du Maroc ») belonging to this division.

Under orders of Général Georges Humbert, the units constituting the Marching Division of the Morocco (French: « Division de Marche du Maroc ») were regrouped at Bordeaux and positioned themselves in the region of Tournes (French Ardennes) on August 18, and that to join the Colonial Troops Army Corps (French: « Corps d’Armée des Troupes Coloniales ») of the IV^{th} Army (French: « 4^{e} Armée Française ») in the battle of (French: « Bataille des frontières »).

On August 20, 1914, the Marching Division of Morocco (French: « Division de Marche du Maroc ») was renamed the Moroccan Division (French: « Division du Maroc ») (another Moroccan Division « 2^{e} Division du Maroc » was enacted on August 4, 1918) formed by principle of two Marching brigades of Morocco (French: « Brigade de Marche du Maroc »).

The Colonial Infantry Marching Regiment of Morocco (French: « Régiment de Marche d’Infanterie Colonial du Maroc ») was subsequently designated as 1st Colonial Infantry Marching Regiment of Morocco (French: « 1^{er} Régiment de Marche d’Infanterie Colonial du Maroc ») with regimental commander Lieutenant-Colonel Pernot leading 3 battalions:

- 6th Battalion of Commandant Vincent – the 7th Battalion of Commandant Coup – and 9th Battalion of Commandant Garrely.

The regiment was attached to the 1st Marching Brigade of Morocco (French: « 1^{re} Brigade de Marche du Maroc ») of général Blondlat, along with the 1st Zouaves Regiment (French: « 1^{er} Régiment de Zouaves ») of Lieutenant-Colonel Leveque leading also 3 battalions of Commandants Lagure, Randier and Burkart.

The 2nd Marching Brigade of Morocco (French: « 2^{e} Brigade de Marche du Maroc ») of Colonel Cros regrouped:

- 1 Regiment of Moroccan Tirailleurs constituted of 3 battalions formed based on Tirailleurs Regiments of Occidental Morocco.
  - (1st Battalion of 5th Tirailleurs of Commandant Britsch - 4th Battalion of 7th Tirailleurs of Commandant De-Ligny - and the 5th Battalion of 4th Tirailleurs of Commandant Tisseye).
- 1 Mixed Regiment, commanded by Lieutenant-Colonel Fellert, constituted of 3 battalions formed based on Tirailleurs Regiments of Oriental Morocco.
  - (1st Battalion of 2nd Tirailleurs of Commandant Mignerot - 4th Battalion of 2nd Tirailleurs of Commandant Sauvageot - and the 3rd Battalion of 6th Tirailleurs of Commandant Clerc), one of the battalions, also formed based on the 2nd Zouaves Regiment (French: « 2^{e} Régiment de Zouaves ») (3rd Battalion of Commandant Modelon).

The 1st Moroccan Division (French: « 1^{re} Division du Maroc ») was supported by:

- 1 Artillery unit commanded by Lieutenant-Colonel Ducros compromised on one marching group under the orders of Commandant Turpin (1st and 2nd batteries of the 4th artillery group of African campaigns as well as the 2nd battery of the 8th artillery group of African campaigns – (French: 1^{re} et 2^{e} Batteries du 4^{e} Groupe d'Artillerie de campagne d'Afrique ainsi que la 2^{e} Batterie du 8^{e} Groupe d'Artillerie de Campagne d'Afrique)) and one group of 2 artillery batteries of the 3rd Colonial Artillery Regiment 3^{e} RAC (French: « 3^{e} Régiment d’Artillerie Coloniale », 3^{e} R.A.C) under the orders of Commandant Martin.
- 1 Engineering Divisionary Company of (French: Génie) of Morocco under the orders of Captain Quinson.

During the battle of Bataille des Ardennes on August 23, 1914, the 1st Moroccan Division (French: « 1^{re} Division du Maroc ») was integrated in the 9th Army Corps (French: « 9^{e} Corps d’Armée ») of the IV^{th} Army (French: « IV^{e} Armée ») under the orders of général Dubois. This army corps had for mission to cover the unfolding of the later while maintaining positions on the designated line Signy-l'Abbaye / La-Fosse-à-l'Eau, on which this corps had to counter a massive advancement.

== World War I ==
=== Order of Battle ===
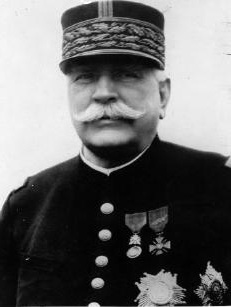
Generalissimo Joseph Joffre in 1914.

- 1st Moroccan Brigade Formation
  - 2nd Mixed Colonial Regiment (French: 2^{e} Régiment Mixte Colonial) – 3 battalions from August till October 1, 1914.
  - Marching Zouaves Regiment (French: Régiment de Marche de Zouaves) – 3 battalions from August till October 1, 1914.
  - 4th Marching Tirailleurs Regiment (French: 4^{e} Régiment de Marche de Tirailleurs, 4^{e} R.M.T) hailing from the French 38th Infantry Division (French: 38^{e} Division d'Infanterie) – October 1, 1914 till June 30, 1918 (rejoined the 2nd Moroccan Division (French: 2^{e} Division Marocaine, 2^{e} DM)).
  - 2nd Marching Regiment of the 1st Foreign Regiment (French: 2^{e} Régiment de Marche du 1^{er} Régiment Etranger, 2^{e}R.M.1^{er}R.E) – October 17, 1914 to November 11, 1915.
  - 2nd Marching Regiment of the 2nd Foreign Regiment (French: 2^{e} Régiment de Marche du 2^{e} Régiment Etranger, 2^{e}R.M.2^{e}R.E) – July 10 to November 11, 1915.
  - Marching Regiment of the Foreign Legion (French: Régiment de Marche de la Légion Etrangère, R.M.L.E), by merger of the two foreign regiments – November 11, 1915 to November 11, 1918.
  - 12e Bataillon de Tirailleurs malgaches – July 7 till November 11, 1918.
  - Russian Legion Battalion (French: Le Bataillon de La Légion Russe, B.L.R) / Honorary Russian Legion (French: La Légion d’Honneur Russe, L.H.R) – beginning of 1918 till November 11, 1918.
- 2nd Moroccan Brigade Formation
  - 1st Mixed Zouaves and Trailleurs Regiment (French: 1^{er} Régiment Mixte de Zouaves et de Tirailleurs, 1^{er} R.M.Z.T) until September 5, 1914; Zouave by designation, no Zouave Battalion was ever found in the 1st Mixed Zouaves and Tirailleurs Regiment.
  - 2nd Mixed Zouaves and Trailleurs Regiment (French: 2^{e} Régiment Mixte de Zouaves et de Tirailleurs, 2^{e} R.M.Z.T) until September 5, 1914.
  - Marching Tirailleurs Regiment of Occidental Morocco (French: Régiment de Marche de Tirailleurs du Maroc Occidental) – 3 battalions from September 5 till October 1, 1914.
  - 1st Battalion of 5th Algerian Tirailleurs (French: 1^{er} Bataillon du 5^{e} Tirailleurs Algériens).
  - 4th Battalion of 7th Algerian Tirailleurs (French: 4^{e} Bataillon du 7^{e} Tirailleurs Algériens).
  - 5th Battalion of 4th Tunisian Tirailleurs (French: 5^{e} Bataillon du 4^{e} Tirailleurs tunisiens).
  - Marching Tirailleurs Regiment of Oriental Morocco (French: Régiment de Marche de Tirailleurs du Maroc Oriental) – 4 battalions from September 5 till October 1, 1914.
  - 1st Battalion of the 2nd Algerian Tirailleurs (French: 1^{er} Bataillon du 2^{e} Tirailleurs Algériens).
  - 4th Battalion of the 2nd Algerian Tirailleurs (French: 4^{e} Bataillon du 2^{e} Tirailleurs Algériens).
  - 3rd Battalion of the 6th Algerian Tirailleurs (French: 3^{e} Bataillon du 6^{e} Tirailleurs Algériens).
  - 3rd Battalion of 2nd Zouaves (French: 3^{e} Bataillon du 2^{e} Zouaves).
  - 7th Marching Tirailleurs Regiment (French: 7^{e} Régiment de Marche de Tirailleurs, 7^{e}R.M.T), formed by merger of the Marching Tirailleurs Regiment of Occidental Morocco (French: Régiment de Marche de Tirailleurs du Maroc Occidental) and Marching Tirailleurs Regiment of Oriental Morocco (French: Régiment de Marche de Tirailleurs du Maroc Oriental) – October 1, 1914 till November 11, 1918.
  - 8th Marching Zouaves Regiment (French: 8^{e} Régiment de Marche de Zouaves, 8^{e}R.M.Z) by changing designation of 8th Marching Zouave Regiment – October 1914 till November 11, 1918.

=== Composition formations ===
==== August–September 1914 ====
- 1st Moroccan Brigade – 1914
  - Colonial Marching Regiment
  - Marching Zouave Regiment
- 2nd Moroccan Brigade – 1914
  - Marching Tirailleurs Regiment of Oriental Morocco
  - Marching Tirailleurs Regiment of Occidental Morocco

==== October 1914 – June 1918 ====
- 1st Moroccan Brigade (1914–1918)
  - Régiment de Marche de la Légion Étrangère, by merger of the 2nd Marching Regiment of the 1st Foreign Regiment (French: 2^{e} Régiment de Marche du 1^{er} Régiment Etranger) with the 2nd Marching Regiment of the 2nd Foreign Regiment (French: 2^{e} Régiment de Marche du 2^{e} Régiment Etranger) on November 11, 1915.
  - 4th Marching Tirailleurs Regiment, hailing from the French 38th Infantry Division.
- 2nd Moroccan Brigade – (1914–1918)
  - 7th Algerian Tirailleurs Regiment/Marching Tirailleurs Regiment, formed by merger of the Tirailluers Marching Regiments of Morocco.
  - 8th Zouave Regiment/ Marching Zouave Regiment, by name change designation of 8th Marching Zouave Regiment.

==== July–November 1918 ====
- 1st Moroccan Brigade (1918)
  - Marching Regiment of the Foreign Legion, R.M.L.E (French: Régiment de Marche de la Légion Étrangère)
  - Russian Legion Battalion (French: Le Bataillon de La Légion Russe, B.L.R) / Honorary Russian Legion (French: La Légion d’Honneur Russe, L.H.R), from the beginning of 1918 to November 1918.
  - 12th Malagasy Tirailleurs Battalion
- 2nd Moroccan Brigade (1918)
  - 7th Algerian Tirailleurs Regiment/Marching Tirailleurs Regiment
  - 8th Zouave Regiment/ Marching Zouave Regiment

=== Engagements ===
Mobilized in Morocco:

==== 1914 ====
- August 6–18: Constitution, then embarked, transported and disembarked at Bordeaux and Sète.
- August 18–23: transported by V.F west of Charleville-Mézières in the department of Ardennes.
- August 23 – 6 September: movement by Mézières towards the north-east, then unfolded by Mézières and Witry-lès-Reims, towards the region of Fère-Champenoise.

August 28: combat of Dommery and Battle of la Fosse-à-l'Eau (Meuse Battle).
August 30: combat at Bertoncourt.
September 1: combat of Neuflize and Alincourt.

- September 6–14: engaged in the first Battle of the Marne: from September 6 to 10, Battle of Marais de Saint-Gond. Combat around the castle de Mondement-Montgivroux. Since September 10, pursuit by Tours-sur-Marne and de Beaumont-sur-Vesle until Prunay and the ferme des Marquises.
- September 14 – April 23, 1915: combat in the region (Bataille de l'Aisne (1914)), the stabilisation and occupation of a sector towards the ferme des Marquises and the north of Sillery, extended left on October 7 until the Fort de la Pompelle (Battle of Mines).

September 23–28: participation to the French attacks in direction of Berru.
October 12, 13 – December 22: local attack.
October 22: combat in the forest by the Zouaves.
October 26, 1914 – February 8, 1915: the 2nd Brigade was transferred to the north. Engaged November 11 in the first Battle of Ypres, lifting of the bois triangulaire (north of Ypres and the Grand Dune (Nieuport-Bain)).

==== 1915 ====
- April 23–27: retrieved from the front, starting April 25, transport by V.F to the region of Épernay, in Saint-Pol-sur-Ternoise.
- April 27–29: movement towards the region Aubigny-en-Artois, then since April 29, occupation of a sector towards the farm de Berthonval and Targette.
- May 9–12: engaged in the seconde bataille de l'Artois, attack on cote 140.
- May 12–26: retrieved from the front. Rest towards Mont-Saint-Éloi, then Tincques.
- May 26 – June 24: movement towards the front and occupation of a sector towards cote 123 of the wooden forest of Carency, reduced to the left, on June 3 made way the red cabaret.

June 16–22: French attacks in direction of Givenchy-en-Gohelle.

- June 24 – September 14: retrieved from the front and rested towards Wail. As of July 4, transported by V.F. in to the region of Montbéliard, since July 15, movement towards Giromagny; instruction and pause.
- September 14 – October 18: transported by V.F. into the region of Lure, in Suippes. As of September 25, engaged towards the wooden forest of Sabot in the seconde bataille de Champagne.

September 25–28: attack towards Trou Bricot and the butte of Souain-Perthes-lès-Hurlus. As of September 30, movement of rocade and occupation of a sector south-east of Sainte-Marie-à-Py.

- October 18 – December 21: retrieved from the front towards Cuperly. As of October 20, transported by V.F. from the region of Cuperly to Pont-Sainte-Maxence; instruction and pause.
- December 21, 1915 – January 16, 1916: movement towards Cœuvres-et-Valsery, instruction.

==== 1916 ====
- January 16 – February 24: movement towards Crépy-en-Valois; instruction. As of January 23, movement by stage towards the camp of Crèvecœur-le-Grand; pause instruction. As of February 13, movement towards the region of Noyers-Saint-Martin; pause.
- February 24 – June 19: movement towards Montdidier (Somme), occupation of a sector between l'Oise and Plessis-de-Roye.
- June 19 – July 6: retrieved from the front. Transported by V.F. into the region of Amiens. In reserve at the beginning of the Battle of the Somme.
- July 6–15: movement towards front, engaged in the Battle of Somme, towards Belloy-en-Santerre and east of Flaucourt

July 7–13: French attack, south-east of Belloy-en-Santerre.

- July 15–29: retrieved from the front. Transported by V.F. in the region of Gournay-sur-Aronde.
- July 29 – October 29: movement towards the front and occupation of a sector between Belval and la lisière south of the wooden forst of Loges.
- October 29 – November 17: retrieved from the front. Pause towards Estrées-Saint-Denis. As of November 3, movement towards the camp de Crèvecœur; instruction.
- November 17 – December 28: transported by truck into the region of Chuignolles. Occupation of a sector towards Belloy-en-Santerre and south of Barleux.
- December 28, 1916 – January 25, 1917: retrieved from the front, movement towards the camp de Crèvecœur; instruction.

==== 1917 ====
- January 25 – February 8: movement towards the front; occupation of a sector towards Beuvraignes and south Armancourt, Somme.
- February 8 – March 14: retrieved from the front. Element at work towards Montdidier, elements at pause towards Froissy and Crèvecœur-le-Grand.
- March 14–31: movement towards Montdidier, engaged within the second frontal line during Operation Alberich.
- March 31 – April 26: transported by V.F. from Montdidier and Hargicourt towards Saint-Hilaire-au-Temple and Cuperly. As of April 3, occupation of a sector between Auberive-sur-Suippe and north of Baconnes. As of April 17, engaged in the bataille des Monts de Champagne, apprehending of Auberive-sur-Suippe.
- April 26 – June 2: retrieved from the front, pause towards Châlons-en-Champagne.
- June 2 – July 4: transported by truck towards Jonchery-sur-Vesle, then starting June 5, occupation of a sector between Miette (rivière) and Aisne.
- July 4 – August 18: retrieved from the front. As of July 10, pause towards Arcis-sur-Aube. As of August 8, transported by truck into the region Verdun; work.
- August 18 – September 3: occupation of a sector toward Chattancourt and Meuse (fleuve).

engaged in the second Battle of Verdun 1917, apprehending of the wooden forest of Corbeaux. Accordingly, organisation of positions towards Meuse and west towards Forges-sur-Meuse

- September 3 – October 3: retrieved from the front, transported by truck into the region of Vaucouleurs (Meuse), then starting September 8 at camp de Bois l'Évêque; pause and instruction.
- October 3, 1917 – January 21, 1918: occupation of a sector between Limey-Remenauville and l'étang de Vargévaux.

January 8, 1918: Local French action north of Flirey towards the wooden forest of Montmare.

==== 1918 ====
- On January 21 – March 31: retrieved from the front, instruction towards Vaucouleurs and work. As of March 26, regroupment towards Vaucouleurs; pause and instruction.
- March 31 – April 24: transported by V.F. north to Beauvais; work and instruction towards Rumigny; then held ready to intervene towards Sains-en-Amiénois and Hangard.
- April 24 – May 7: movement towards the front, participated to the action of supporting Australian and British troops during the Bataille de Villers-Bretonneux 1918, south of la bourgade and towards the wooden forest (bois) of Hangard. Organization and defensive mountings, in this region with a reduced left sector, on April 29, until the northern lisière of the wooden forest of Hangard.
- May 7–28: retrieved from the front, transported by trucks towards Nanteuil-le-Haudouin; paused.
- May 28 – June 4: transported by truck towards Dommiers. Engaged in the Third Battle of the Aisne towards the Montagne de Paris, Missy-aux-Bois, Chaudun, combat and retrieved, then organisation again at the front. As of June 1, regroupment in the region of Vivières, Villers-Cotterêts.
- June 4–20: movement towards the front and occupation of a sector towards Ambleny and Aisne, made way right on June 14 towards Ambleny and Fosse-en-Haut.

June 12: counter-attacked.

- June 20 – July 5: retrieved from the front and paused towards Rethondes.
- July 5–22: movement towards the front and occupation of a sector towards Fosse-en-Haut and Saint-Pierre-Aigle. As of July 18, engaged towards Laversine and Saint-Pierre-Aigle in the Battle of Soisonnais (part of Second Battle of the Marne), attack on Saint-Pierre-Aigle, Dommiers and Chaudun.
- July 22 – August 27: retrieved from the front; transported into the regions Breteuil and Crèvecœur-le-Grand; pause.
- August 27 – September 17: transported by truck to the front, preparation of offensives. Took part in the frontal line pushing towards the Hindenburg Line. Apprehending of Terny-Sorny, September 5; progression towards Vauxaillon, apprehending of positions of region of Allemant ( September 14–15, Battle of Vauxaillon )
- September 17 – October 13: retrieved from the front and paused toward Vic-sur-Aisne, then towards Meaux. As of September 24, transported by V.F. to Rosières-aux-Salines; paused.
- October 13 – November 11: movement towards the front and occupation of a sector towards Brezange-la-Grande and Brin-sur-Seille; offensive preparations.
- November 17: Liberation of Château-Salins and Moselle.

== Army attachments and Army Corps detachments ==
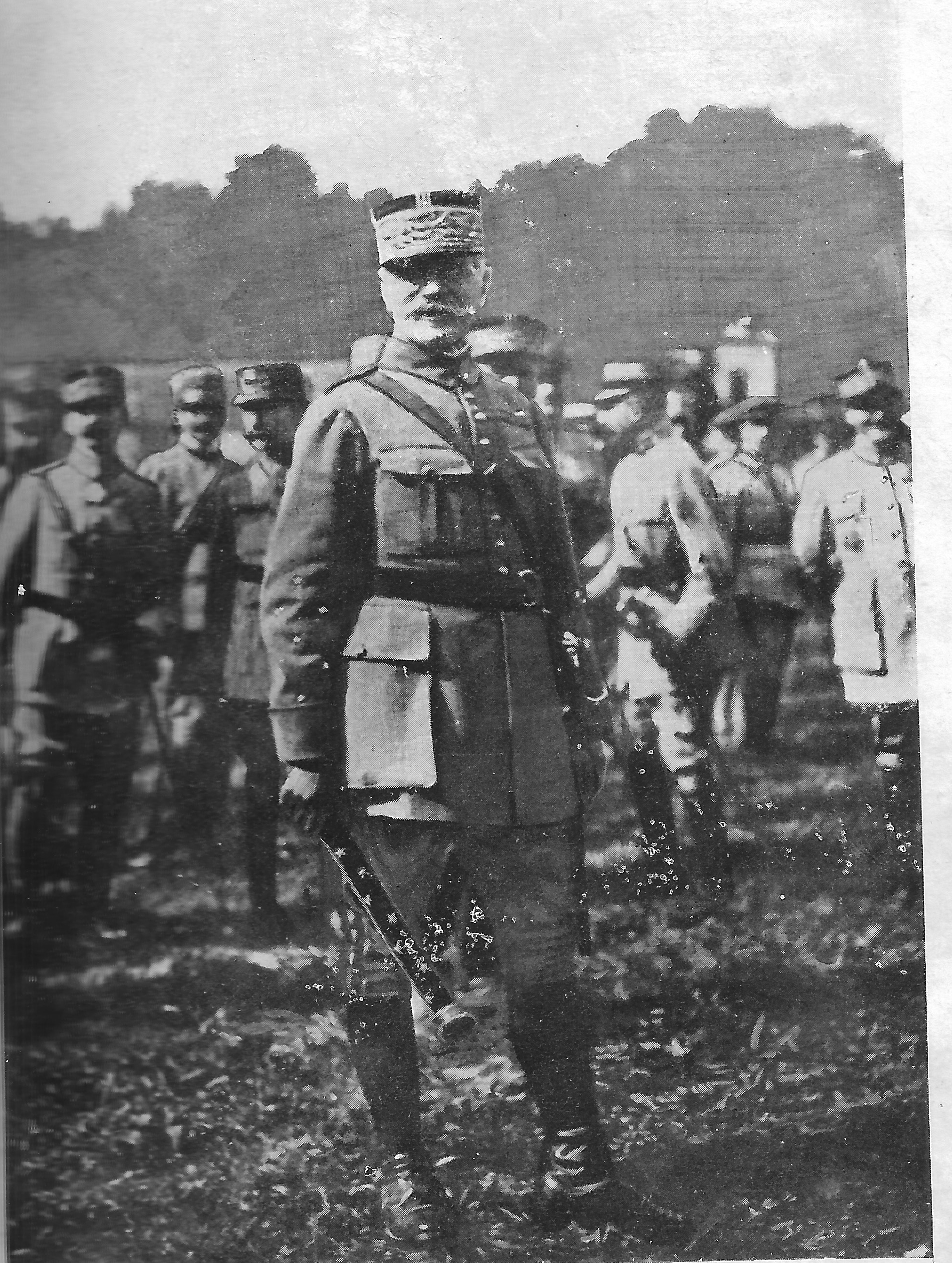
Marshal of France Ferdinand Foch in 1918 with baton.

Most Armed/Army Corps (French: Corps d'armée, C.A) (which are a formation of several divisions) are the subdivisions of an Army (French: Armée), which could also be the designation of an Air Army/Force (French: l'Armée de l'Air) or Naval Army/Force (French: l'Armée de Mer) contingent. However and throughout the courses of the World Wars, France centralized the vast majority of front combat theatre battles, led almost entirely by regiments of the French Army (French: L'Armée de Terre), hence the designation of "Army" (France). During World War I, the Moroccan Division being organically assigned part of the French Army included the following land "Army" (French: Armée) attachments which included various Army Corps (French: Corps d'armée, C.A) detachments (including Naval infantry and Air auxiliaries part of the various respective Army (French: Armée) and Army Corps (French: Corps d'Armée)):

August 1914: isolated
September 1914: combined corps Humbert, then 32nd Army Corps (France) (French: 32^{e} Corps d'Armée 32^{e} C.A.) which included French Navy Fusiliers Marins of the Brigade de Fusiliers Marins
October 1914 – November 1918: isolated

- First Army (France)/I^{st} Army (French: I^{re} Armée)

October 29 – November 3, 1916
January 5 – March 26, 1918
April 4 – May 7, 1918
22–27 August 1918

- Second Army (France)/II^{nd} Army (French: II^{e} Armée)
  - 9th Army Corps

January 23 – February 13, 1916
July 24 – September 3, 1917

- Third Army (France)/III^{rd} Army (French: III^{e} Armée)

July 16 – October 29, 1916
January 11 – March 31, 1917
7–12 May 1918

- Fourth Army (France)/IV^{th} Army (French: IV^{e} Armée)

21–29 August 1914
March 31 – June 2, 1917
September 15 – October 20, 1915
7–24 July 1917

- Fifth Army (France)/V^{th} Army (French: V^{e} Armée)

October 7, 1914 – April 26, 1915
June 2 – July 7, 1917
March 31 – April 4, 1918
12–27 May 1918

- Sixth Army (France)/VI^{th} Army (French: VI^{e} Armée)

October 20, 1915 – January 23, 1916
February 13 – April 12, 1916
June 20 – July 16, 1916
May 27 – June 2, 1918

- Seventh Army (France)/VII^{th} Army (French: VII^{e} Armée)

July 4 – September 15, 1915

- Eighth Army (France)/VIII^{th} Army (French: VII^{e} Armée)

September 3, 1917 – January 5, 1918
26–31 March 1918
September 27 – November 10, 1918

- Ninth Army (France)/IX^{th} Army (French: IX^{e} Armée)
  - 9th Army Corps

September 5 – October 7, 1914

- Tenth Army (France)/X^{th} Army (French: X^{e} Armée)

April 26 – July 4, 1915
April 12 – June 20, 1916
November 3, 1916 – January 3, 1917
June 2 – August 22, 1918
August 27 – September 27, 1918
10–11 November 1918

- Army Detachment of Ferdinand Foch

August 29 – September 5, 1914

- Interior

August 2–21

== Division Decorations ==
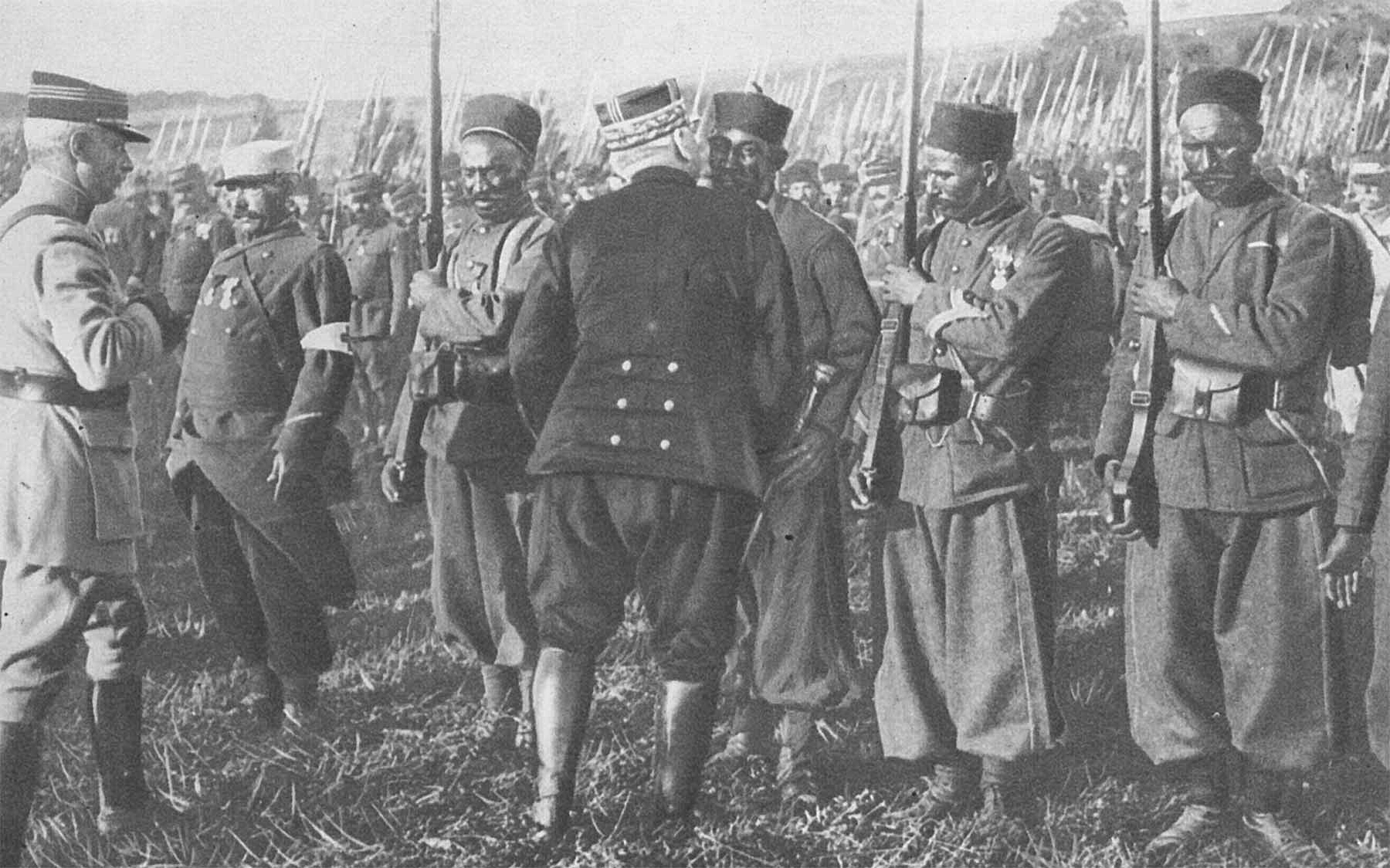
Generalissimo Joseph Joffre with soldiers of the Moroccan Division in 1915.

- Regimental Colors decorated with the Médaille militaire
  - Marching Regiment of the Foreign Legion (26/09/1919)
- Regimental Colors decorated with the Légion d'honneur
  - Marching Regiment of the Foreign Legion (04/12/1917)
  - 4th Marching Tirailleurs Regiment (05/07/1919)
  - 7th Marching Tirailluers Regiment (05/07/1919)
  - 8th Marching Zouaves Regiment (05/07/1919)
- Fourragere bearing ruban colours of the Légion d’honneur and ruban of the Croix de Guerre 1914-1918 (at least 9 citations at the orders of the armed forces) (French: 9 citations à l'ordre de l'Armée)
  - Marching Regiment of the Foreign Legion (9 citations)
- Fourragere bearing ruban colours of the Légion d’honneur (6-8 citations at the orders of the armed forces) (French: 6-8 citations à l'ordre de l'Armée)
  - 8th Zouaves Regiment (7 citations)
  - 4th Tunisian Tirailleurs Regiment (6 citations)
  - 7th Algerian Tirailleurs Regiment (6 citations)
- Fourragere bearing ruban colours of the Croix de guerre 1914-1918 (2-3 citations at the order of the armed forces) (French: 2-3 citations à l'ordre de l'Armée)
  - fr:12e bataillon de tirailleurs malgaches (3 citations)
  - Russian Legion Battalion (French: Le Bataillon de La Légion Russe, B.L.R) / Honorary Russian Legion (French: La Légion d’Honneur Russe, L.H.R) (2 citations)

== Moroccan Division Commanders ==
=== Division Commanders ===
- August 18 – October 8, 1914: Division Général Humbert
- October 8, 1914 – June 21, 1915: Division Général Ernest Joseph Blondlat
- June 21, 1915 – August 3, 1916: Division Général Codet
- August 3, 1916 – September 1, 1917: Division Général Degoutte
- September 1, 1917 – January 23, 1922: Général Albert Joseph Marie Daugan

=== Brigade Commanders ===
- 1st Moroccan Brigade

Général Blondlat: August 18 – September 14, 1914.
Colonel Mérienne-Lucas: September 14 – October 1914.
Colonel Lavenir: October 5, 1914 – March 13, 1915.
Colonel Pein: March 13 – May 9, 1915 (killed in action) while also regimental commander in lead of 2nd Marching Regiment of the 1st Foreign Regiment
Colonel Delavau: May 14, 1915 – February 10, 1916.
Colonel Demetz: February 10, 1916 – July 5, 1917.
Colonel Eugène Mittelhauser: July 9, 1917 – April 27, 1918.
Colonel Boucher: April 27, 1918.

- 2nd Moroccan Brigade

Colonel Cros: September 28, 1914 – May 10, 1915 (killed).
Colonel d'Anselme: May 14, 1915 – January 23, 1916.
Colonel Pierre Girondon: January 25, 1916 – May 25, 1916 (killed as général commandant of the French 12th Infantry Division (French: 12e division d'infanterie, 12e DI))
Colonel Schuhler: May 25, 1916 – July 17, 1918.
Colonel Bertrand: July 20, 1918.

== Memorial of Givenchy-en-Gohelle ==
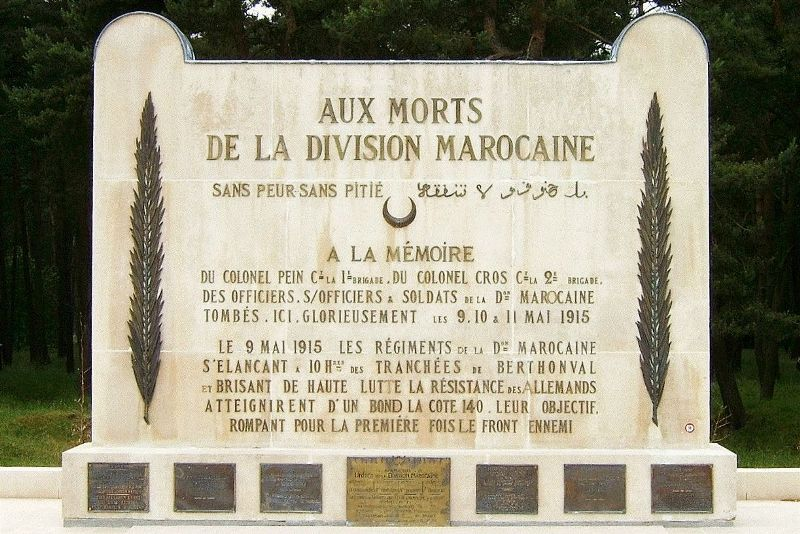
Moroccan Division Memorial.

A Monument was inaugurated in June 1925 at Givenchy-en-Gohelle on the plateau de Vimy, in front of the Canadian National Vimy Memorial, and renders homage to the Moroccan Division and the hundreds of thousands of Foreign soldiers engaged for France during the War.

== Moroccan Division - Gallery ==
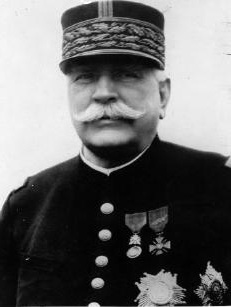
Generalissimo
Joseph Joffre in 1914.

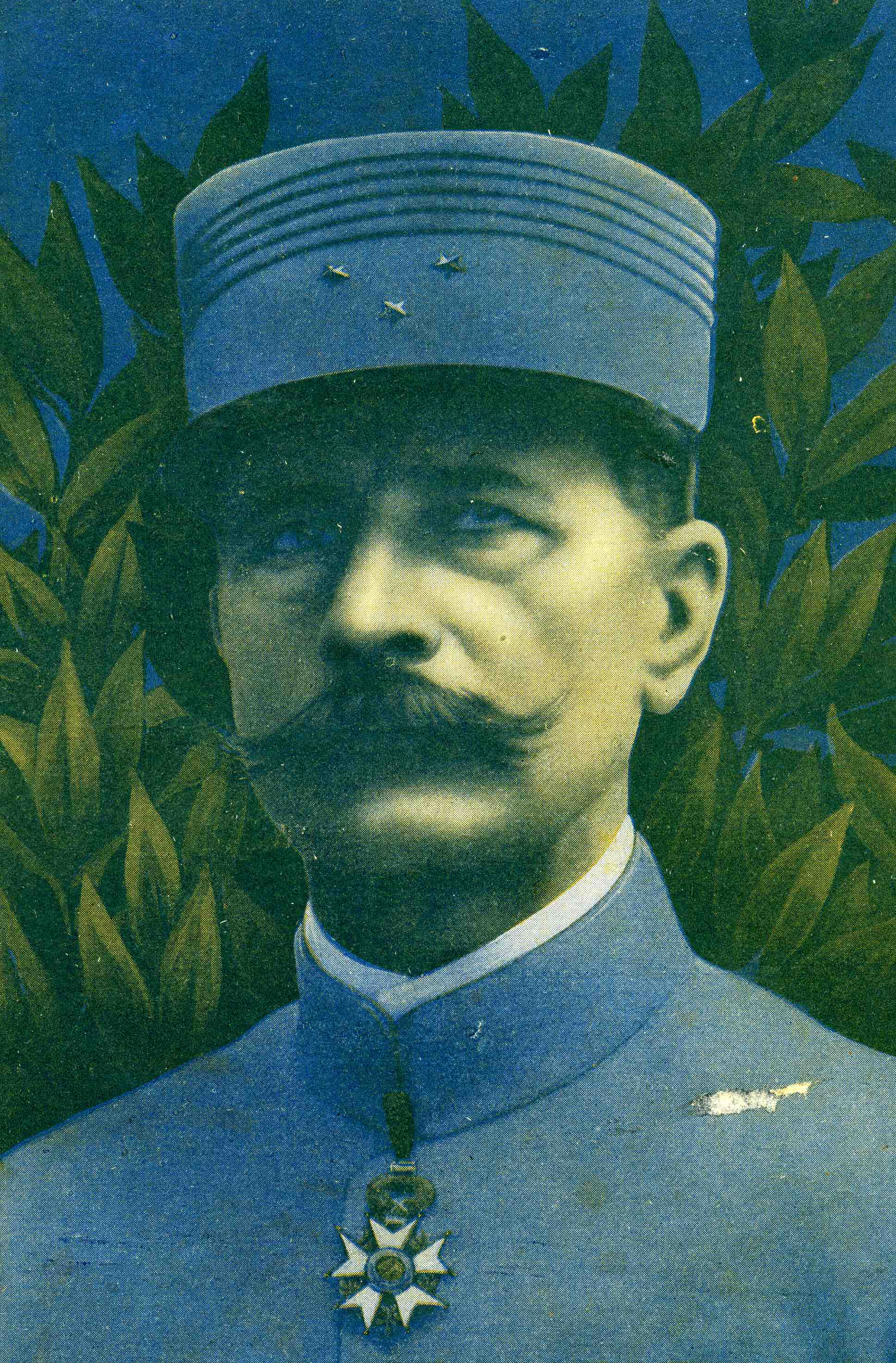
Division Général
Jean Degoutte in 1918.

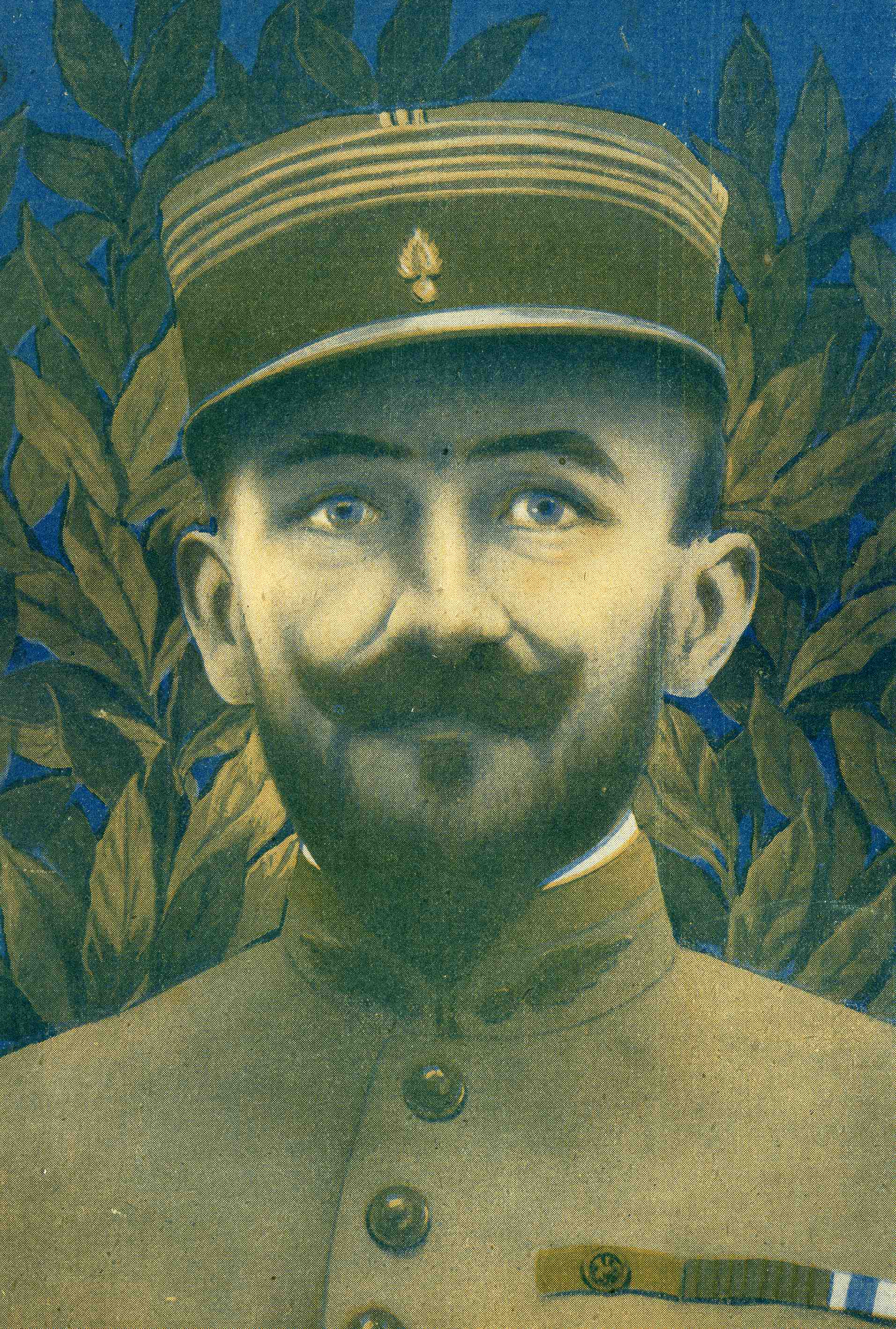
Colonel
Paul-Frédéric Rollet in 1919.

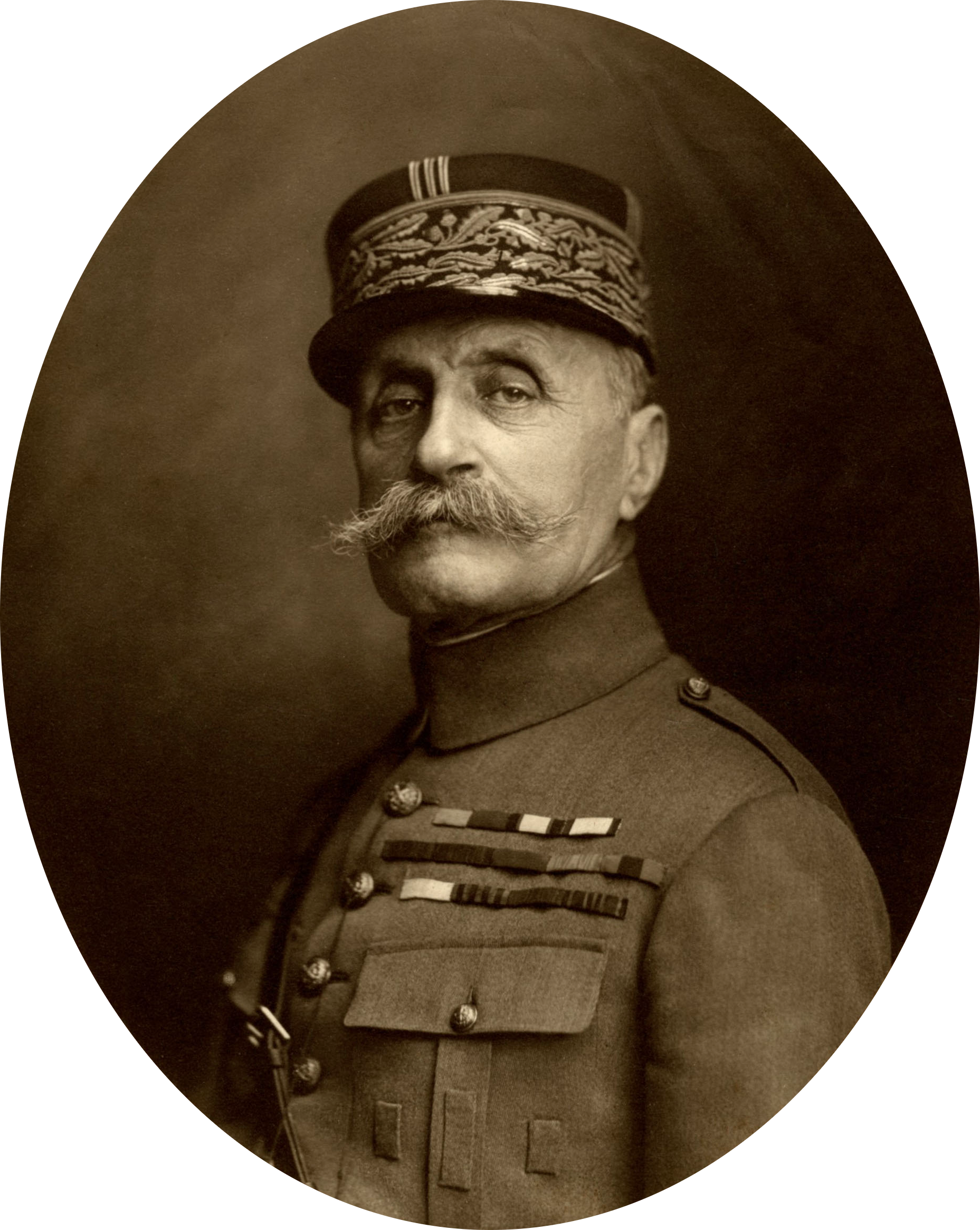
Marshal of France
Ferdinand Foch in 1921.

== See also ==
- Lafayette Escadrille
- Escadron de Chasse 2/4 La Fayette
- Escadron de Chasse 1/4 Gascogne
- Jean de Lattre de Tassigny
- 3rd Marine Artillery Regiment
- Régiment d'infanterie-chars de marine
- 3rd Algerian Infantry Division

== Bibliographies ==
- Strohn, Matthias, ed. (2016). The Battle of the Somme. Bloomsbury Publishing. ISBN 978-1472815576.
- Jean-Louis Larcade, Zouaves et tirailleurs, les régiments de marche et les régiments mixtes : 1914-1918, Argonautes, 2000
- Anthony Clayton, Histoire de l'Armée française en Afrique 1830-1962, Albin Michel, 1994
- Pages de gloire de la Division marocaine, 1919
- AFGG, vol. 2, t. 10 : Ordres de bataille des grandes unités : divisions d'infanterie, divisions de cavalerie, 1924, 1092 p. (lire en ligne).
- (fr) Ministère des Armées, État-Major de l'Armée de Terre, Service Historique, Inventaire sommaire des archives de la Guerre 1914–1918, Imprimerie « La Renaissance »
