= Battle of Courtrai (1918) =

Battle of the Hundred Days Offensive of World War I

- Part of the Hundred Days Offensive of World War I
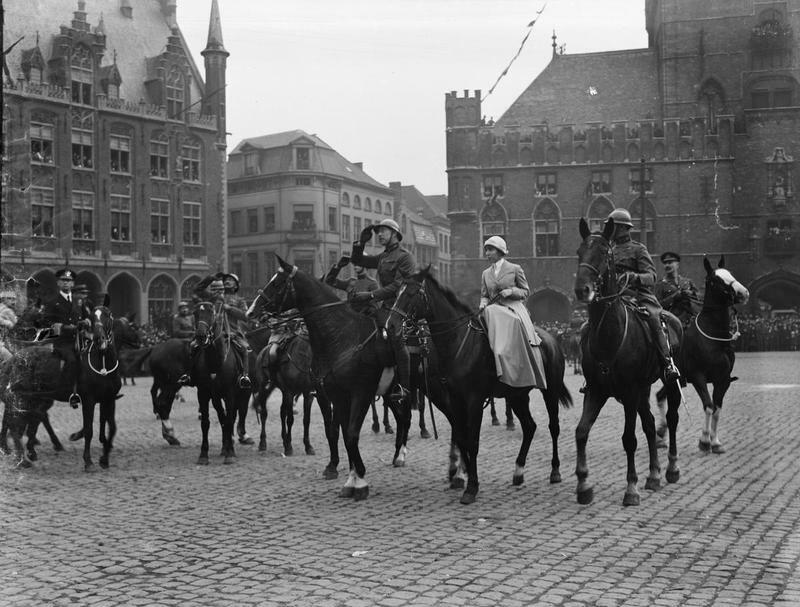
- Liberation of Bruges - King Albert I of the Belgians with his wife, Queen Elisabeth enter Bruges on 25 October 1918 alongside Admiral Roger Keyes (far left) and the 1st Earl of Athlone (far right)
Date	14–19 October 1918
Location	Ypres, Belgium to Ghent, Belgium 50°50′N 03°16′E
Result	Allied victory

Belligerents
Belgium; British Empire: (Dominion of Newfoundland) Newfoundland; United Kingdom; France	German Empire

Commanders and leaders
(Belgium) King Albert I (French Third Republic) Jean Degoutte (Belgium) Cyriaque Gillain (United Kingdom of Great Britain and Ireland) Herbert Plumer	(German Empire) Erich Ludendorff (German Empire) Crown Prince Rupprecht (German Empire) Sixt von Armin (German Empire) Ferdinand von Quast

Casualties and losses
Not available	Not available 12,000 soldiers captured 550 artillery pieces captured.

The Battle of Courtrai (also known as the Second Battle of Belgium (French: 2ème Bataille de Belgique) and the Battle of Roulers (French: Bataille de Roulers)) was one of a series of offensives in northern France and southern Belgium that took place in late September and October 1918.

== Background ==
The Groupe d'Armées des Flandres (GAF) comprising twelve Belgian divisions, ten divisions of the British Second Army and six divisions of the French Sixth Army, under the command of King Albert I of Belgium, with the French General Jean Degoutte as Chief of Staff, defeated the German 4th Army in the Fifth Battle of Ypres (28 September – 2 October). The breaking of the Hindenburg Line further south, led the Allies to follow a strategy of pursuing the Germans for as long as possible, before movement was stopped by the winter rains. Mud and a collapse of the supply-system, had stopped the advance in early October but by the middle of the month, the GAF was ready to resume the offensive.

== Battle ==
The offensive began at 5:35 a.m. on 14 October, with an attack by the GAF from the Lys river at Comines northwards to Diksmuide. The British creeping barrage advanced at a rate of 100 yards (91 m) per minute, much faster and much further than the practice in 1917, in expectation that there would be little resistance from German infantry. By the evening the British forces had reached high ground which dominated Werviq, Menen and Wevelghem in the south; further north the British captured Moorslede and closed up to Gulleghem and Steenbeek. Belgian troops on the left reached Iseghem, French troops surrounded Roulers and more Belgian troops captured Cortemarck.

Roulers fell the next day and by 16 October, the British held the north bank of the Lys up to Harelbeke and had crossed the river at several points. By 17 October, Thourout, Ostend, Lille and Douai had been recaptured; Bruges and Zeebrugge fell by 19 October and the Dutch border was reached the following day. The crossing of the Lys and the capture of Courtrai by the British Second Army on 19 October, led to a German retreat on the front of the Fifth Army further south, which encircled Lille on 18 October. The next day the British were in Roubaix and Tourcoing and by the evening of 22 October, the British had reached the Scheldt from Valenciennes to Avelghem.

== Aftermath ==
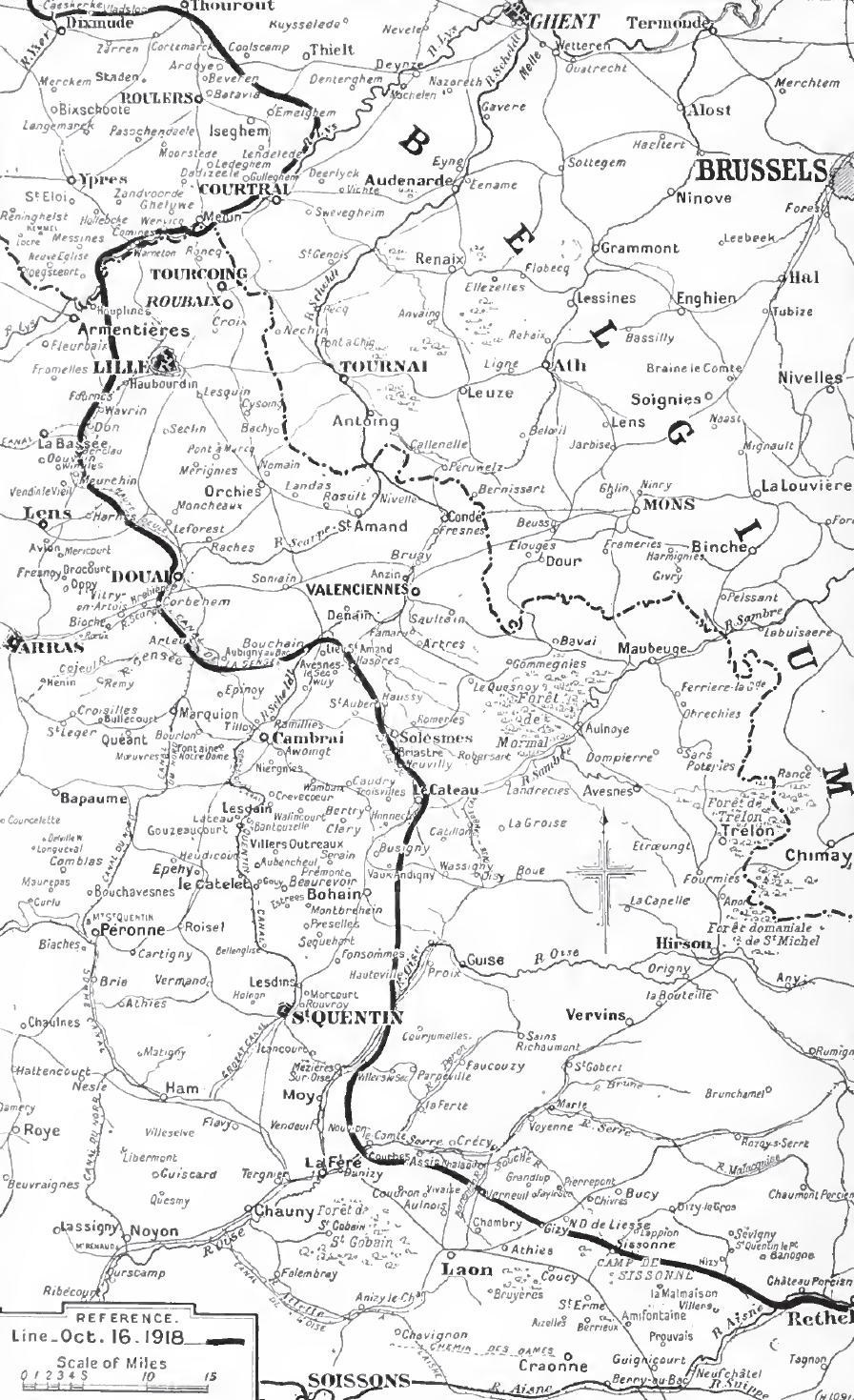
Western Front, 16 October 1918

A new offensive would be launched by the GAF on 30 October, which would be ended by the Armistice signed on 11 November. By the time the Armistice had been signed, the front was an average of 45 miles (72 km) east of the old front line and ran from Terneuzen to Ghent, along the River Scheldt to Ath and from there to Saint-Ghislain, where it joined with the BEF positions on the Somme.

== See also ==
- Battle of Courtrai (disambiguation), for other battles with this name
- Charge of Burkel, a skirmish between Belgian and German forces on 19 October 1918, notable as the last cavalry charge in Western Europe.
