= Battle of Kortrijk =

There have been two battles at Kortrijk, a Flemish town in Belgium, called Courtrai in French :

- Battle of the Golden Spurs
- Battle of Kortrijk (1794)
- Battle of Courtrai (disambiguation)
