= List of aerial victories of Bruno Loerzer =

In the First World War, Bruno Loerzer became a fighter ace credited with 44 confirmed aerial victories while flying for the German Luftstreitkräfte.

== List of victories ==
List
No.	Date	Victim	Squadron	Location
1	21 March 1916	Farman		Fosse Wood
2	31 March 1916	Enemy aircraft		
3	6 March 1917	Nieuport		Dannekirch
4	10 March 1917	SPAD	Escadrille Spa.81, Service Aéronautique	Between Altkirch and Carspach, France
5	30 April 1917	Enemy aircraft		Bellenglise, France
6	16 August 1917	SPAD	No. 19 Squadron RFC	Langemarck, Belgium
7	15 August 1917	Nieuport	No. 1 Squadron RFC	Bousbeque
8, or	20 September 1917	Royal Aircraft Factory SE.5a	No. 60 Squadron RFC	Gravenstafel
8	20 September 1917	Sopwith Camel	No. 45 Squadron RFC	Gravenstafel
9	22 September 1917	Royal Aircraft Factory SE.5a	No. 60 Squadron RFC	Westrozebeke, Belgium
10	24 September 1917	Sopwith Camel	No. 66 Squadron RFC	Northwest of Diksmuide, Belgium
11	26 September 1917	Sopwith Camel	No. 70 Squadron RFC	Gravenstafel
12	30 September 1917	Sopwith Camel	No. 70 Squadron RFC	Koekuit, Belgium
13	5 October 1917	Royal Aircraft Factory SE.5a	No. 56 Squadron RFC	East of Menen, Belgium
14	9 October 1917	Royal Aircraft Factory RE.8	No. 9 Squadron RFC	Langemarck
15	12 October 1917	Airco DH.4	No. 57 Squadron RFC	Southeast of Thielt, Belgium
16	15 October 1917	Bristol F.2 Fighter	No. 22 Squadron RFC	Aarsele, Belgium
17	17 October 1917	Sopwith Pup	No. 54 Squadron RFC	South of Nieuwpoort, Belgium
18	21 October 1917	Sopwith Camel	No. 4 Naval Squadron, RNAS	Wyndaele, Belgium
19	27 October 1917	Sopwith Camel	No. 70 Squadron RFC	West of Diksmuide, Belgium
20	30 October 1917	Nieuport	No. 1 Squadron RFC	Westrozebeke, Belgium
21	3 January 1918	Airco DH.4	No. 57 Squadron RFC	Southeast of Zonnebeke, Belgium
22	19 January 1918	Bristol F.2 Fighter	No. 20 Squadron RFC	South of Houthulst Forest, Belgium
23	18 February 1918	Sopwith Camel	No. 70 Squadron RFC	Houthulst Forest, Belgium
24	23 March 1918	Sopwith Camel		Beugny, France
25	30 May 1918	SPAD		
26	13 June 1918	SPAD		Dommiers, France
27	16 July 1918	Nieuport 28	27th Aero Squadron, USAAS	Putnay
28	19 July 1918	SPAD		Coeuvres, France
29	20 July 1918	SPAD		
30	13 August 1918	Royal Aircraft Factory SE.5a		
31	14 August 1918	Royal Aircraft Factory SE.5a		
32	26 August 1918	Sopwith Camel	17th Aero Squadron, USAAS	Beugny, France
33	29 August 1918	Sopwith Camel		Chérisy, France
34	29 August 1918	Sopwith Camel		Chérisy, France
35	1 September 1918	Bristol F.2 Fighter	No. 62 Squadron RAF	
36	2 September 1918	Sopwith Camel		Dury, Pas-de-Calais, France
37	3 September 1918	Royal Aircraft Factory SE.5a		Douai, France
38	4 September 1918	Sopwith Camel	No. 70 Squadron RAF	Monchecourt, France
39	5 September 1918	Royal Aircraft Factory SE.5a	No. 92 Squadron RAF	Inchy, France
40	16 September 1918	Bristol F.2 Fighter		Dourges, France
41	16 September 1918	Royal Aircraft Factory SE.5a		
42	22 September 1918	Sopwith Camel		
43 and 44	26 September 1918	Enemy aircraft		
