= Jean-Paul Brun =

French winemaker

Jean-Paul Brun is a French winemaker based in southern Beaujolais. He started Terres Dorées in 1979 with four hectares of vines in Charnay, and the estate has since expanded to roughly 30 hectares and an additional 15 hectares in Beaujolais crus.

== Wine criticism ==
Terres Dorées, Chardonnay Classic 2013 was rated 95 points by Decanter magazine. James Suckling rated the Jean-Paul Brun Domaine des Terres Dorées Beaujolais Blanc 2015 at 92 points, and Robert M. Parker Jr. also rated the 2011 at 92 points.
