= Hangard =

- Commune
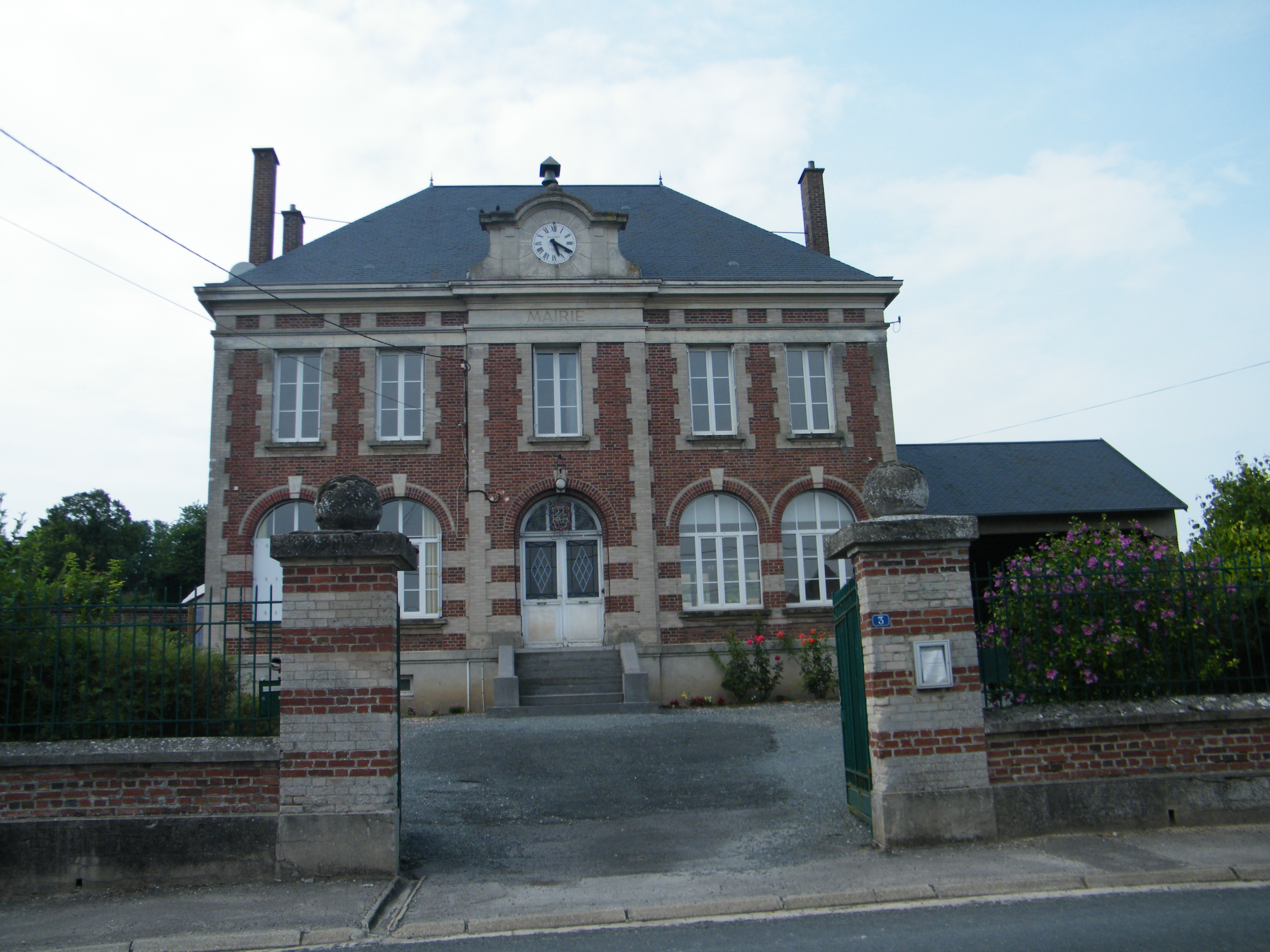
- The town hall in Hangard

- Coat of arms
- Location of Hangard
- Location within France Location within Hauts-de-France
- Coordinates: 49°49′25″N 2°30′47″E
- Country: France
- Region: Hauts-de-France
- Department: Somme
- Arrondissement: Montdidier
- Canton: Moreuil
- Intercommunality: CC Avre Luce Noye

Government
  - Mayor (2020–2026): Olivier Dutilleux
- Area^{1}: 6.34 km^{2} (2.45 sq mi)
- Elevation: 50 m (160 ft)
- Highest elevation: 102 m (335 ft)
- Lowest elevation: 35 m (115 ft)
- Population (2023): 115
  - Density: 18.1/km^{2} (47.0/sq mi)
- Time zone: UTC+01:00 (CET)
  - Summer (DST): UTC+02:00 (CEST)
- INSEE/Postal code: 80414 /80110
- ^{1} French Land Register data, which excludes lakes, ponds, glaciers > 1 km^{2} (0.386 sq mi or 247 acres) and river estuaries.

Hangard (French pronunciation: [ɑ̃ɡaʁ]) is a commune in the Somme department in Hauts-de-France in northern France. The commune is centered on Hangard village.

== Gallery ==
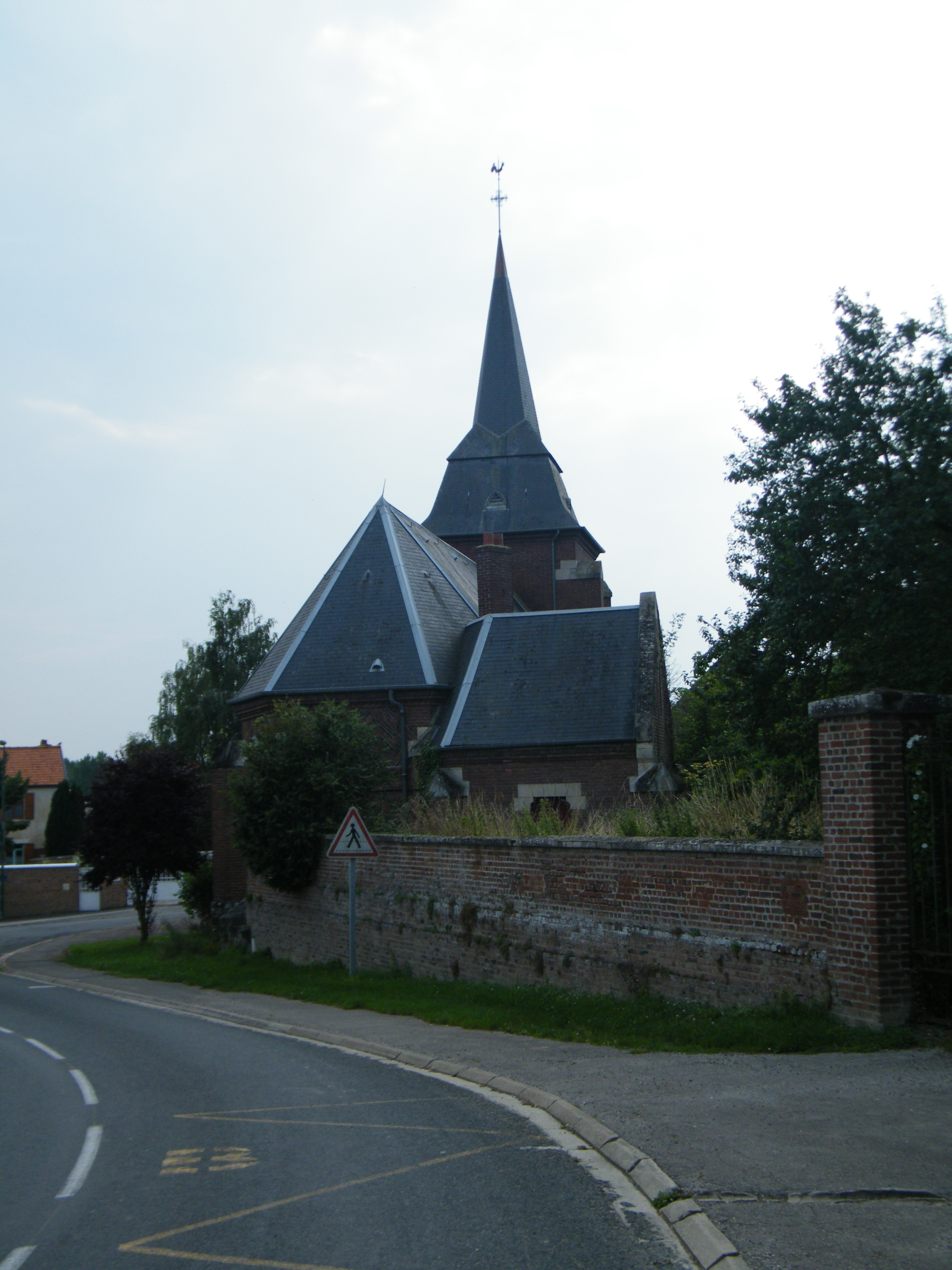
saint-Martin Hangard

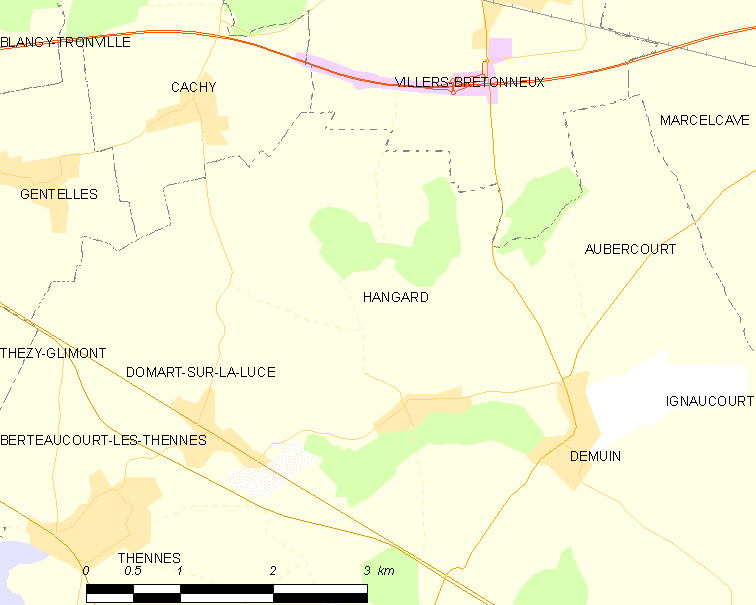
Map of the commune

== Geography ==
Hangard is on the D76 road, some 13 miles (21 km) southeast of Abbeville, and is at an elevation of about 35 m (115 ft).

== Population ==
Historical population
Year	Pop.	±% p.a.
1968	75	—
1975	82	+1.28%
1982	73	−1.65%
1990	87	+2.22%
1999	100	+1.56%
2007	116	+1.87%
2012	121	+0.85%
2017	124	+0.49%
2023	115	−1.25%
Source: INSEE

Census records show that at the French Revolution the village had 244 inhabitants, but by 1846 this had risen to 345 after which the population began to decline until it was 172 just prior to the First World War. The village was destroyed in the second battle of Villers-Bretonneux, and thereafter has maintained a population of about 100.

== History ==
The name comes from a personal name "Hano" and the Germanic "Gardo" and means ‘Hano’s garden’.
In 1135 the name was spelt ‘Hangardum’.

== Neolithic ==
Stone-age tools of flint, in the shape of blades, arrows and axes have been found in the area. The excavations made in 1890 revealed weapons of worked stones were found near the village, including carved polished flint stones, each shaped knife, scraper and other axe-shaped.

A dolmen once stood nearby but has now disappeared into the marshy land.

During World War I, on 28 March 1918, the village was evacuated. By April 1918 the village had been totally destroyed.

=== Middle Ages ===
In the 12th century, the Lord of Hangard was Foulques Lehardi, a valiant knight, known for his strength and his bravery in many battles, in the crusades. He was however, wounded, captured and ransomed during the crusade. In 1362, the village is mentioned in a census as the stronghold of Madam Jehanne of Rivery. A number of other lords of the village are known, including:

- Bernard of Hangard 1146;
- Jehan de Hangard 1219;
- Henri Hangard 1248;
- Drieu of Hangard 1337;
- Jean de Hangard 1350;
- Jean de Hangard 1380;
- Gilles de Hangard 1437;
- Jacques de Hangard 1473.
- Pierre-François of Incourt Lord of Hangard (c.1725 - 1760)

=== Religion ===
The village church is dedicated to Saint Martin and was built in 1523. Under the Bell Tower is the tombstone of Frucourt, wife of Jacques de Roye, the Lord of Hangard Claire. She died on 25 April 1523, and it is considered that she commissioned the Church.

In 1612, the peel of two bells was installed and four new bells in 1786. An additional Bell was installed in 1839. Between 1670 and 1690, a number of inhabitants moved to Neunkirchen, Germany due to the persecution of protestants under Louis XIV.

=== World War I ===
During the First World War the village was caught up in the second battle of Villers-Bretonneux. A specific action at the village was called the battle of Hangard Wood. On 28 March 1918 the evacuation of the village was organized by Mr. Farcy teacher and Secretary of the City Hall of Hangard. Only Timothée Gaby remained with his wife until 31 March.

On 24 April, there is fierce fighting in the streets, the village was utterly destroyed. Latter a gift from the city of Tangier (Morocco) will allow the rebuilding of the village. A Moroccan unit was involved in the battle.

By July the municipality has housed 102 000 men, 3 000 officers, 40 000 horses.

== See also ==
- Communes of the Somme department
