= Jean Degoutte =

French general

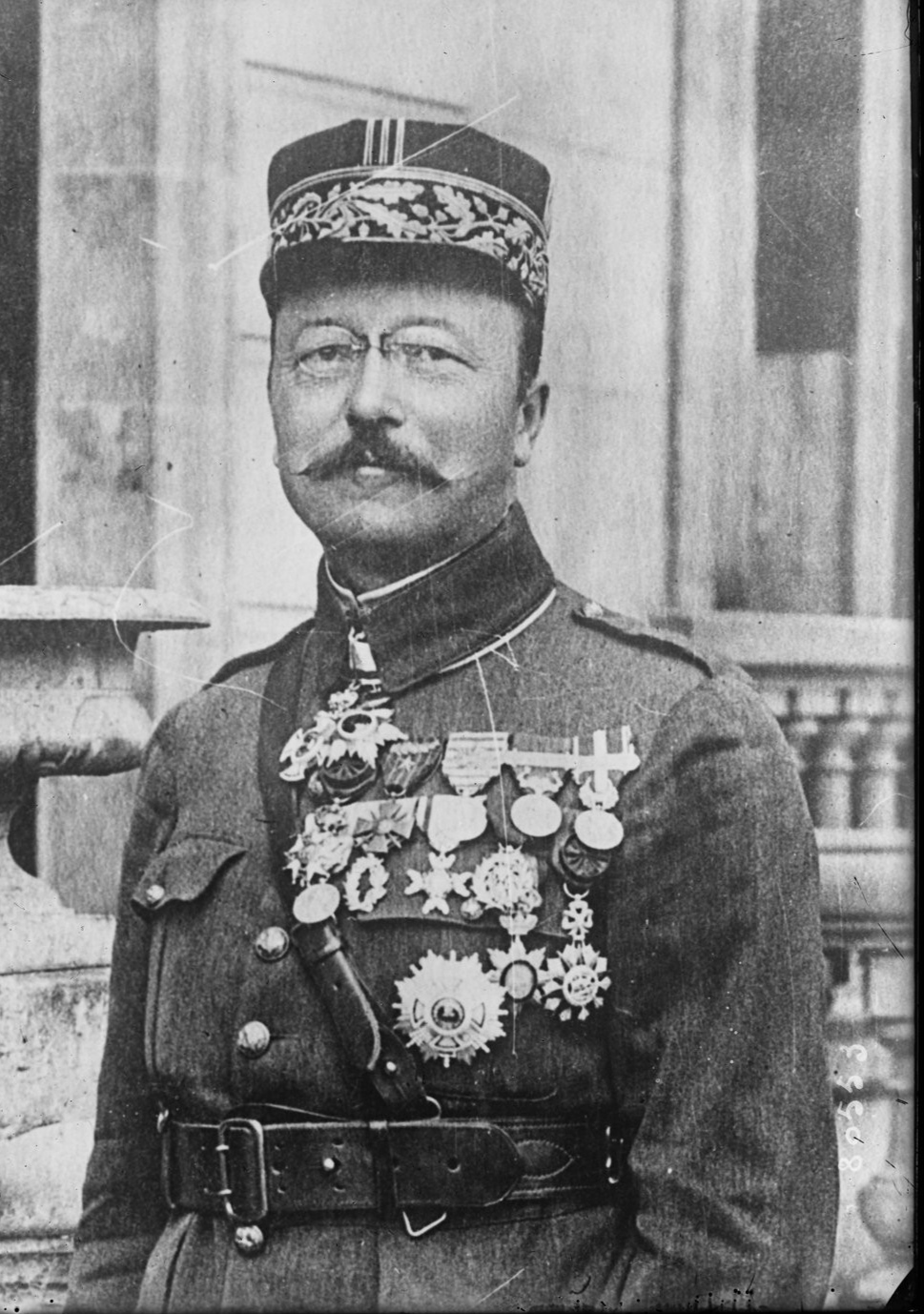
- Born: April 18, 1866; Charnay, Rhône, France
- Died: October 31, 1938 (aged 72); Charnay, Rhône, France
- Military career
- Allegiance: France
- Branch: French Army
- Service years: 1888 – 1925
- Rank: Général de division
- Conflicts: Franco-Hova Wars; Boxer Rebellion; World War I Occupation of the Ruhr
- Awards: Médaille militaire Grand Cross of the Légion of Honor; Croix de Guerre 1914–1918

Jean Marie Joseph Degoutte (18 April 1866, Charnay, Rhône – 31 October 1938) was a French general active in the colonies and the First World War.

== Colonial career ==
Degoutte joined the 31st Artillery Regiment on 7 March 1887 and then attended Saint Cyr where he graduated 9th out of 435. After graduating he joined a Zouave unit in Tunisia. In 1895 his request to join the French expedition to Madagascar was denied, resulting in him taking a three-month leave. During that leave he accompanied a group of Jesuits that traveled to Madagascar on a civilian steamer. Arriving there amidst the landing of the French expeditionary forces, he was arrested by General Dechesnes, but Colonel Bailloud was able to persuade his senior officers to release Degoutte and utilise his language skills.

Degoutte returned to Tunisia in March 1896 where he remained until 1899, when he entered the Ecole Superieure de Guerre. He joined Bailloud in his invasion of China, being mentioned twice in dispatches. In 1905 he was promoted to adjutant general in command of a division in Algiers. In 1906 he was briefly commander of the 20th Corps, before returning to Zouaves, then in 1909 he returned to command the Algiers Division.

In 1911 he took part in operations in Western Morocco during the Agadir Crisis, returning to France in 1912 with promotion to lieutenant-colonel. After attending the Centre des Hautes Etudes Militaires he was given command of the 4th Corps.

== First World War ==
Following the start of the First World War, Degoutte was appointed Colonel and then Brigadier General in 1916, whereon he took command of the Moroccan Division in the French Army. These troops were involved in battles of the Somme, Champagne and Verdun. He commanded the 6th Army in the final months of World War I, and delivered a speech praising the contribution of the US forces under his command on 9 August 1918, following the Second Battle of the Marne.

== Occupation of the Rhineland ==
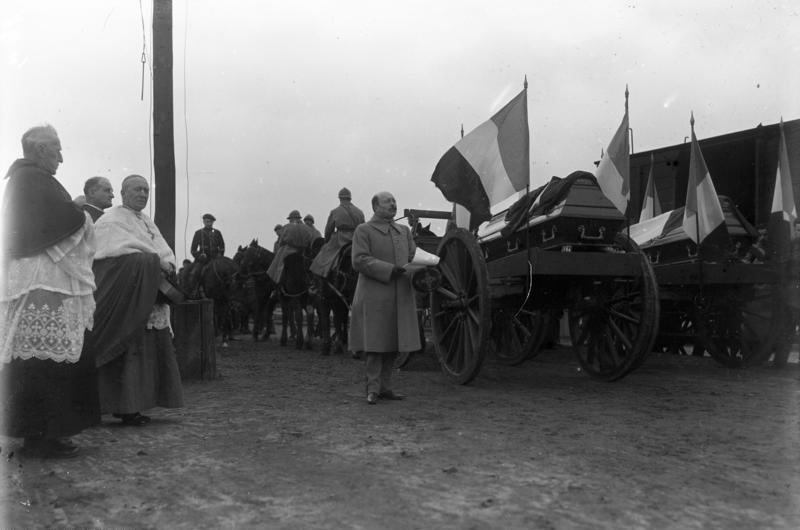
Degoutte attending a funeral in Gelsenkirchen, 1923

In 1919 he was appointed commander of the French Army of the Rhine where he remained until 1925. In 1923 he was in command of the French troops during the occupation of the Ruhr.

== See also ==
- Moroccan Division
