= Battle of Courtrai =

The Battle of Courtrai or Kortrijk may refer to:

- Siege of Courtrai (1302), preceding the Battle of the Golden Spurs
- Battle of Courtrai (1302), better known as the Battle of the Golden Spurs, in which the French king was defeated by Flemish militia
- Battle of Courtrai (1580), between Catholic Malcontents and the Calvinist Republic of Ghent during the Eighty Years' War
- Siege of Courtrai (1646), in which France conquers the city from Spain during the Franco-Spanish War (1635–1659).
- Siege of Courtrai (1667), in which France conquers the city from Spain during the War of Devolution.
- Siege of Courtrai (1683), in which France conquers the city from Spain during the War of the Reunions.
- Battle of Courtrai (1793), battle between the French Revolutionary Army and an Austrian-British force
- Battle of Courtrai (1794), in which the French Revolutionary Army fought the First Coalition
- Battle of Courtrai (1814), battle between French and Saxon troops during the War of the Sixth Coalition
- Battle of Courtrai (1815), battle during the Hundred Days of the War of the Seventh Coalition
- Battle of Courtrai (1918), the second phase of the northern Allied offensive against the German Hindenburg Line
