= Sixt von Armin =

Sixt von Armin is a surname. Notable people with the surname include:

- Friedrich Sixt von Armin (1851–1936), German general
- Hans-Heinrich Sixt von Armin (1890–1952), German general, son of Friedrich
