= Chaudun =

- Commune
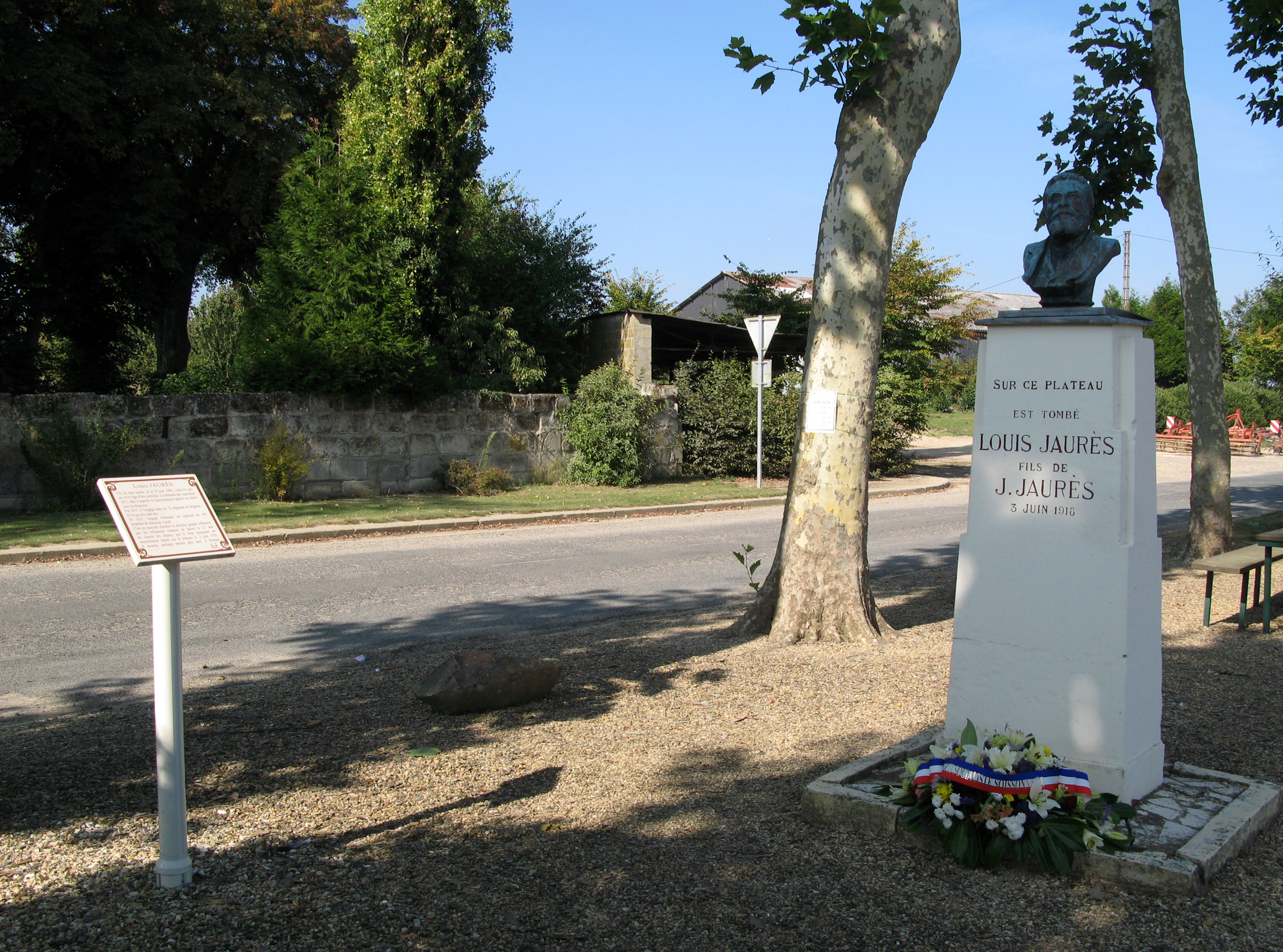
- Monument to a dead soldier, the son of French politician Jean Jaurès
- Location of Chaudun
- Location within France Location within Hauts-de-France
- Coordinates: 49°19′07″N 3°15′55″E
- Country: France
- Region: Hauts-de-France
- Department: Aisne
- Arrondissement: Soissons
- Canton: Villers-Cotterêts
- Intercommunality: Oulchy le Château

Government
  - Mayor (2026–32): Jérôme Aubert
- Area^{1}: 8.52 km^{2} (3.29 sq mi)
- Elevation: 152 m (499 ft)
- Highest elevation: 157 m (515 ft)
- Lowest elevation: 105 m (344 ft)
- Population (2023): 238
  - Density: 27.9/km^{2} (72.3/sq mi)
- Time zone: UTC+01:00 (CET)
  - Summer (DST): UTC+02:00 (CEST)
- INSEE/Postal code: 02172 /02200
- ^{1} French Land Register data, which excludes lakes, ponds, glaciers > 1 km^{2} (0.386 sq mi or 247 acres) and river estuaries.

Chaudun (French pronunciation: [ʃodœ̃]) is a commune in the department of Aisne in Hauts-de-France in northern France.

== History ==
=== Early history ===
The village of Chaudun developed around a priory, on the site now occupied by the Aubert farm. Until approximately 1100, the settlement was dependent on the Abbey of Notre-Dame de Soissons. After the village was deserted, an agreement was reached with the Abbey of Saint-Jean-des-Vignes in Soissons to restore and repopulate the settlement.

=== Church and architectural heritage ===
The first church at Chaudun was built in the 13th century but disappeared during the Hundred Years' War (1337–1453). The present church, originally dedicated to Saint George and now known as Notre-Dame de l'Assomption, was largely rebuilt during the 16th century. Its portal bears the date 1564. The building consists of a nave, two side aisles and a choir.

=== First World War ===
In July 1918, during the Allied counter-offensive known as the Second Battle of the Marne, the church was heavily damaged during the fighting associated with the French offensive under General Mangin. Approximately half of the building was destroyed. It was subsequently reconstructed, incorporating modifications to the original structure.

== Population ==
Historical population
Year	Pop.	±% p.a.
1968	234	—
1975	294	+3.31%
1982	257	−1.90%
1990	287	+1.39%
1999	282	−0.20%
2007	262	−0.92%
2012	255	−0.54%
2017	249	−0.48%
2023	238	−0.75%
Source: INSEE

== See also ==
- Communes of the Aisne department
