= Saint-Pierre-Aigle =

- Commune
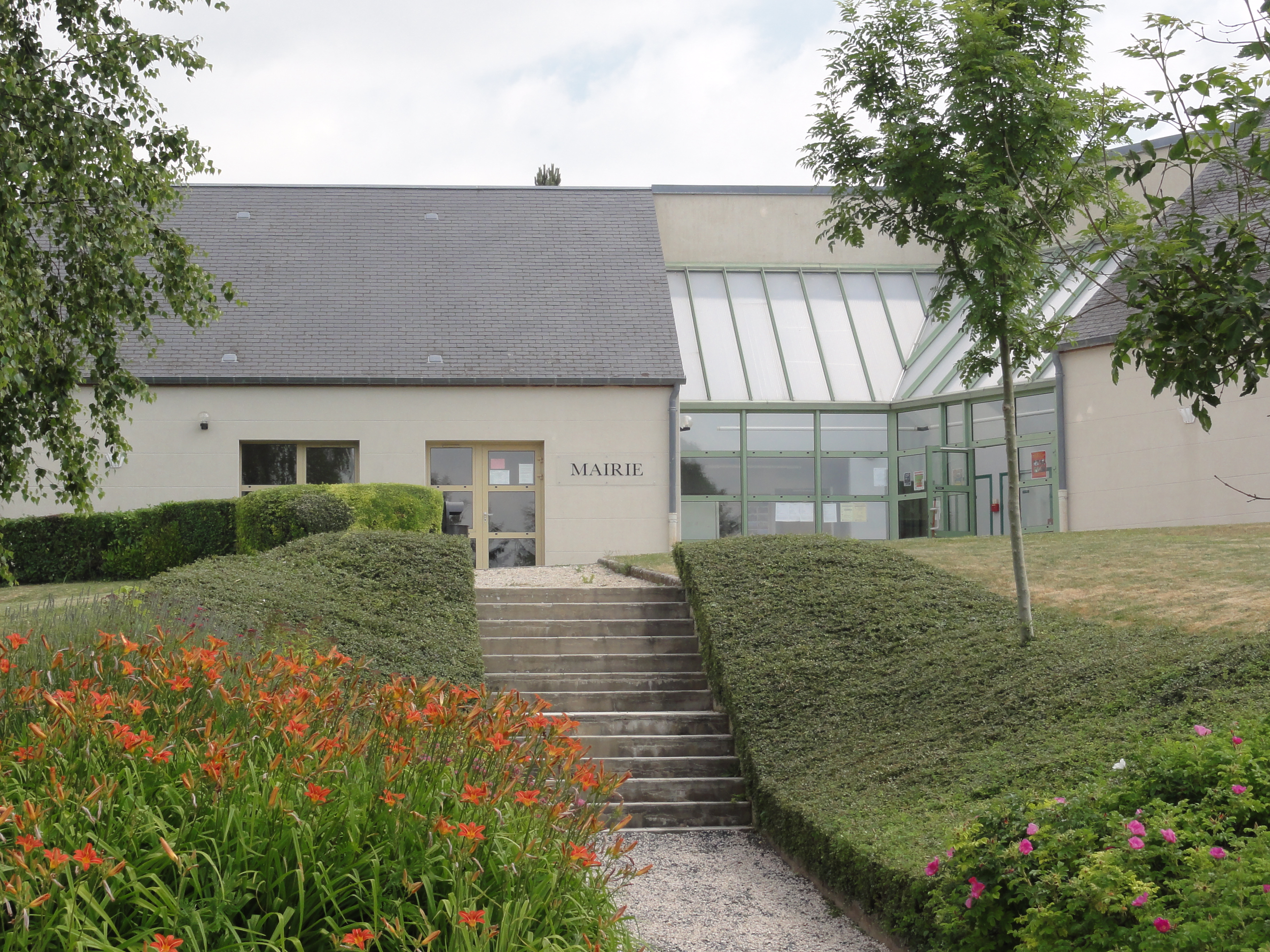
- The town hall of Saint-Pierre-Aigle

- Coat of arms
- Location of Saint-Pierre-Aigle
- Location within France Location within Hauts-de-France
- Coordinates: 49°19′15″N 3°11′12″E
- Country: France
- Region: Hauts-de-France
- Department: Aisne
- Arrondissement: Soissons
- Canton: Vic-sur-Aisne

Government
  - Mayor (2026–32): Baptiste Bazin-Kretzschmar
- Area^{1}: 12.02 km^{2} (4.64 sq mi)
- Elevation: 134 m (440 ft)
- Highest elevation: 163 m (535 ft)
- Lowest elevation: 68 m (223 ft)
- Population (2023): 328
  - Density: 27.3/km^{2} (70.7/sq mi)
- Time zone: UTC+01:00 (CET)
  - Summer (DST): UTC+02:00 (CEST)
- INSEE/Postal code: 02687 /02600
- ^{1} French Land Register data, which excludes lakes, ponds, glaciers > 1 km^{2} (0.386 sq mi or 247 acres) and river estuaries.

Saint-Pierre-Aigle (French pronunciation: [sɛ̃ pjɛʁ ɛɡl]) is a commune in the Aisne department in Hauts-de-France in northern France.

== History ==
=== Origins and medieval period ===
The history of Saint-Pierre-Aigle can be traced back to the period around the beginning of the 11th century. The name of the village is believed to have Latin and Christian origins. An earlier shortened form, Saint-Pierrelle, was also used historically.

The local seigneury originally consisted of two separate fiefs: Aille, which depended on the County of Soissons, and Saint-Pierre, which belonged to the lordship of Oulchy. These two territories subsequently became integrated into a single settlement.

=== Military conflicts ===
The village experienced military disturbances during the Hundred Years' War and was affected by the invasions of 1814, 1815 and 1870.

During the First World War, Saint-Pierre-Aigle was relatively little affected by the German invasion of 1914. However, the fighting in 1918 caused considerable destruction. The French 418th Infantry Regiment participated in the recapture of the village in June 1918.

== Population ==
Historical population
Year	Pop.	±% p.a.
1968	232	—
1975	175	−3.95%
1982	201	+2.00%
1990	289	+4.64%
1999	356	+2.34%
2007	361	+0.17%
2012	347	−0.79%
2017	334	−0.76%
2023	328	−0.30%
Source: INSEE

== See also ==
- Communes of the Aisne department
