= Cuperly =

- Commune
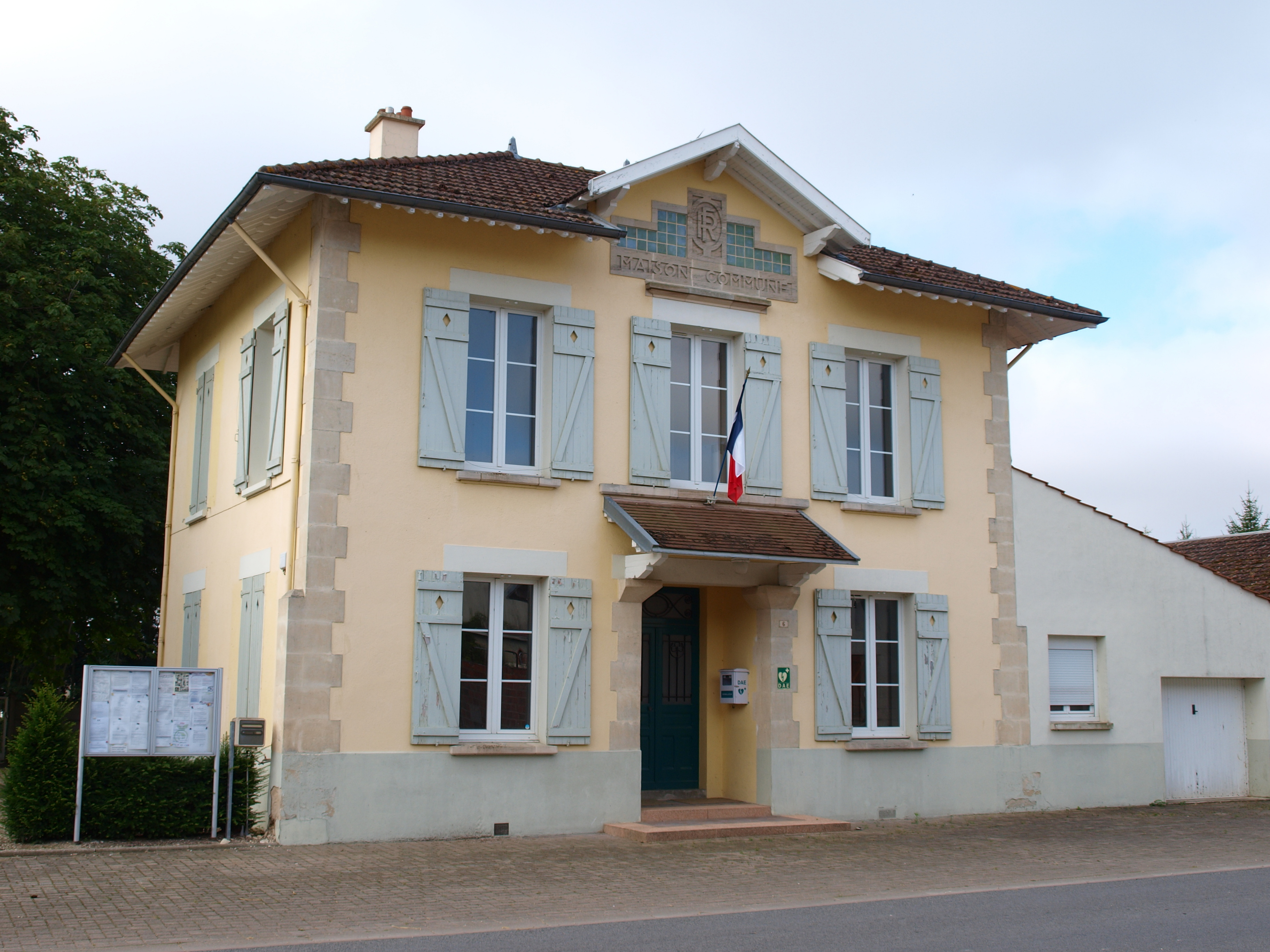
- The town hall in Cuperly
- Location of Cuperly
- Location within France Location within Grand Est
- Coordinates: 49°03′46″N 4°25′56″E
- Country: France
- Region: Grand Est
- Department: Marne
- Arrondissement: Châlons-en-Champagne
- Canton: Argonne Suippe et Vesle
- Intercommunality: Région de Suippes

Government
  - Mayor (2020–2026): Catherine Bouloy
- Area^{1}: 20.92 km^{2} (8.08 sq mi)
- Elevation: 135 m (443 ft)
- Population (2023): 216
  - Density: 10.3/km^{2} (26.7/sq mi)
- Time zone: UTC+01:00 (CET)
  - Summer (DST): UTC+02:00 (CEST)
- INSEE/Postal code: 51203 /51400
- ^{1} French Land Register data, which excludes lakes, ponds, glaciers > 1 km^{2} (0.386 sq mi or 247 acres) and river estuaries.

Cuperly (French pronunciation: [kypɛʁli]) is a commune in the Marne department in north-eastern France.

== See also ==
- Communes of the Marne department
