= Charnay, Rhône =

Charnay
- Commune
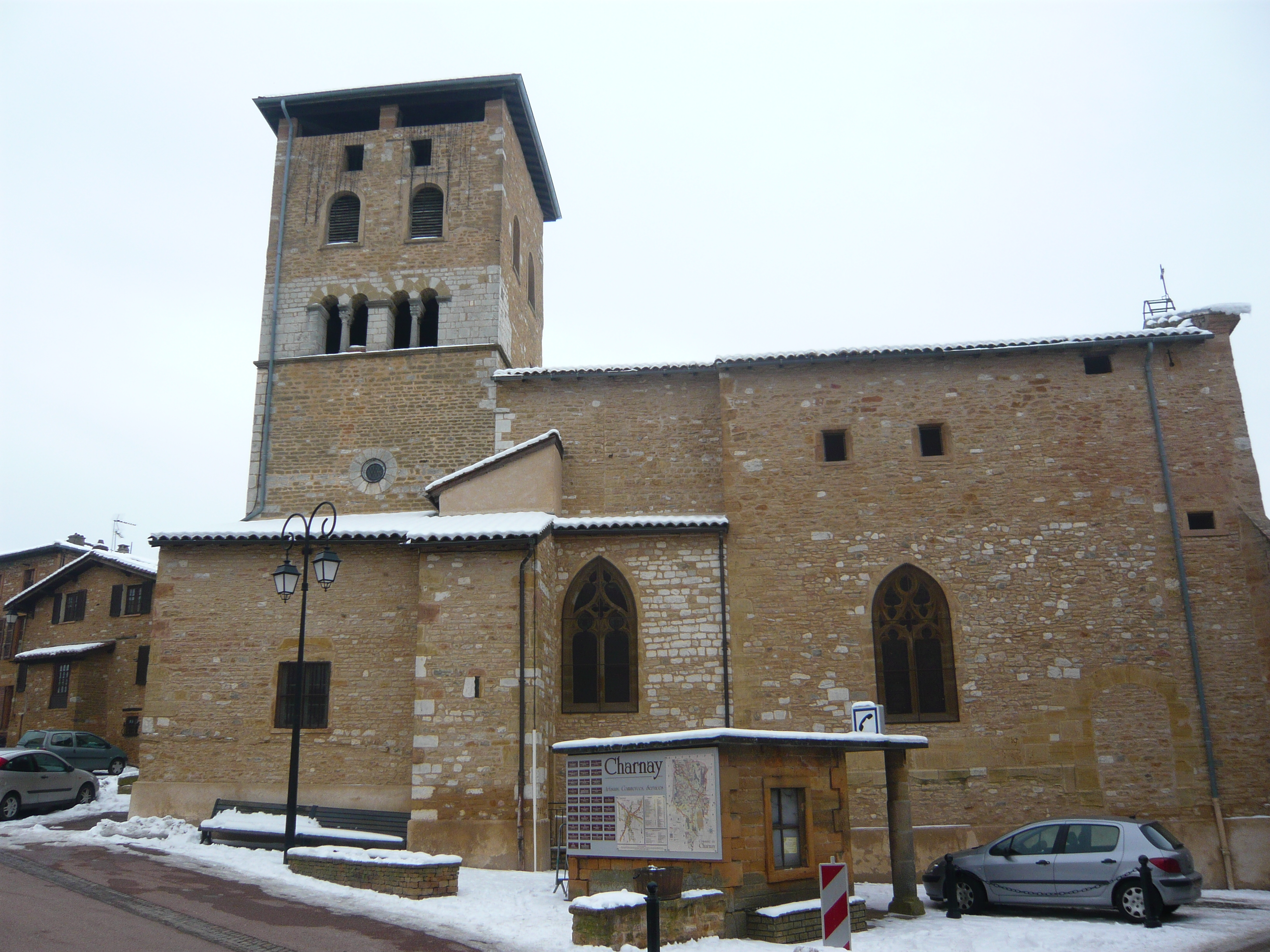
- The church in Charnay

- Coat of arms
- Location of Charnay
- Location within France Location within Auvergne-Rhône-Alpes
- Coordinates: 45°53′29″N 4°40′09″E
- Country: France
- Region: Auvergne-Rhône-Alpes
- Department: Rhône
- Arrondissement: Villefranche-sur-Saône
- Canton: Val d'Oingt
- Intercommunality: Beaujolais Pierres Dorées

Government
  - Mayor (2020–2026): Laurent Dubuy
- Area^{1}: 7.06 km^{2} (2.73 sq mi)
- Elevation: 450 m (1,480 ft)
- Highest elevation: 446 m (1,463 ft)
- Lowest elevation: 206 m (676 ft)
- Population (2023): 1,023
  - Density: 145/km^{2} (375/sq mi)
- Time zone: UTC+01:00 (CET)
  - Summer (DST): UTC+02:00 (CEST)
- INSEE/Postal code: 69047 /69380
- ^{1} French Land Register data, which excludes lakes, ponds, glaciers > 1 km^{2} (0.386 sq mi or 247 acres) and river estuaries.

Charnay (French pronunciation: [ʃaʁnɛ]) is a commune in the Rhône department in eastern France.

The village is part of the Beaujolais wine region and is home to numerous wineries. It is also regionally famous for its authentic medieval village.

== Demography ==
Historical population
Year	Pop.	±% p.a.
1968	515	—
1975	551	+0.97%
1982	609	+1.44%
1990	775	+3.06%
1999	964	+2.45%
2007	1,067	+1.28%
2012	1,072	+0.09%
2017	1,057	−0.28%
2023	1,023	−0.54%
Source: INSEE

== Gallery ==
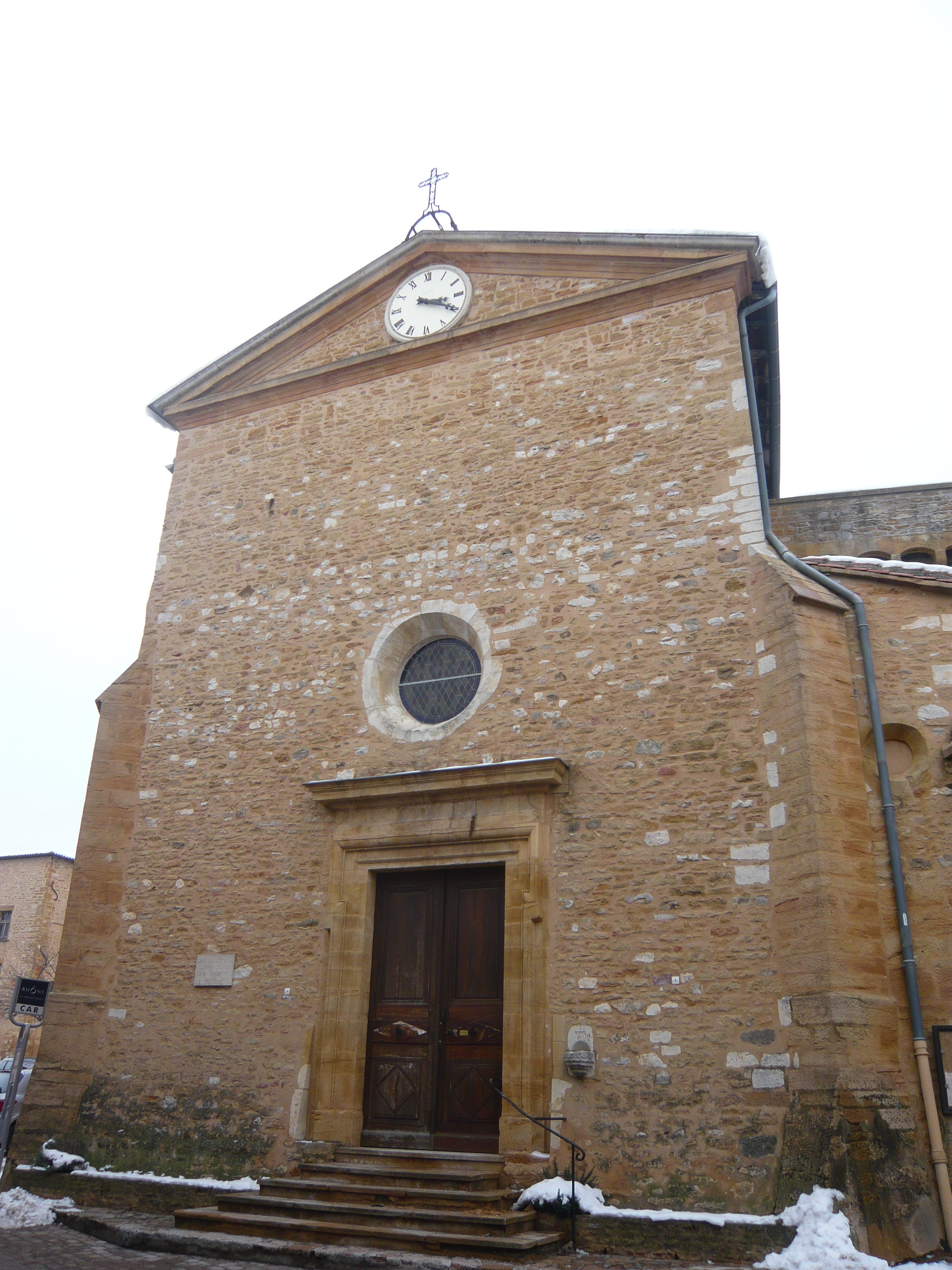
The church

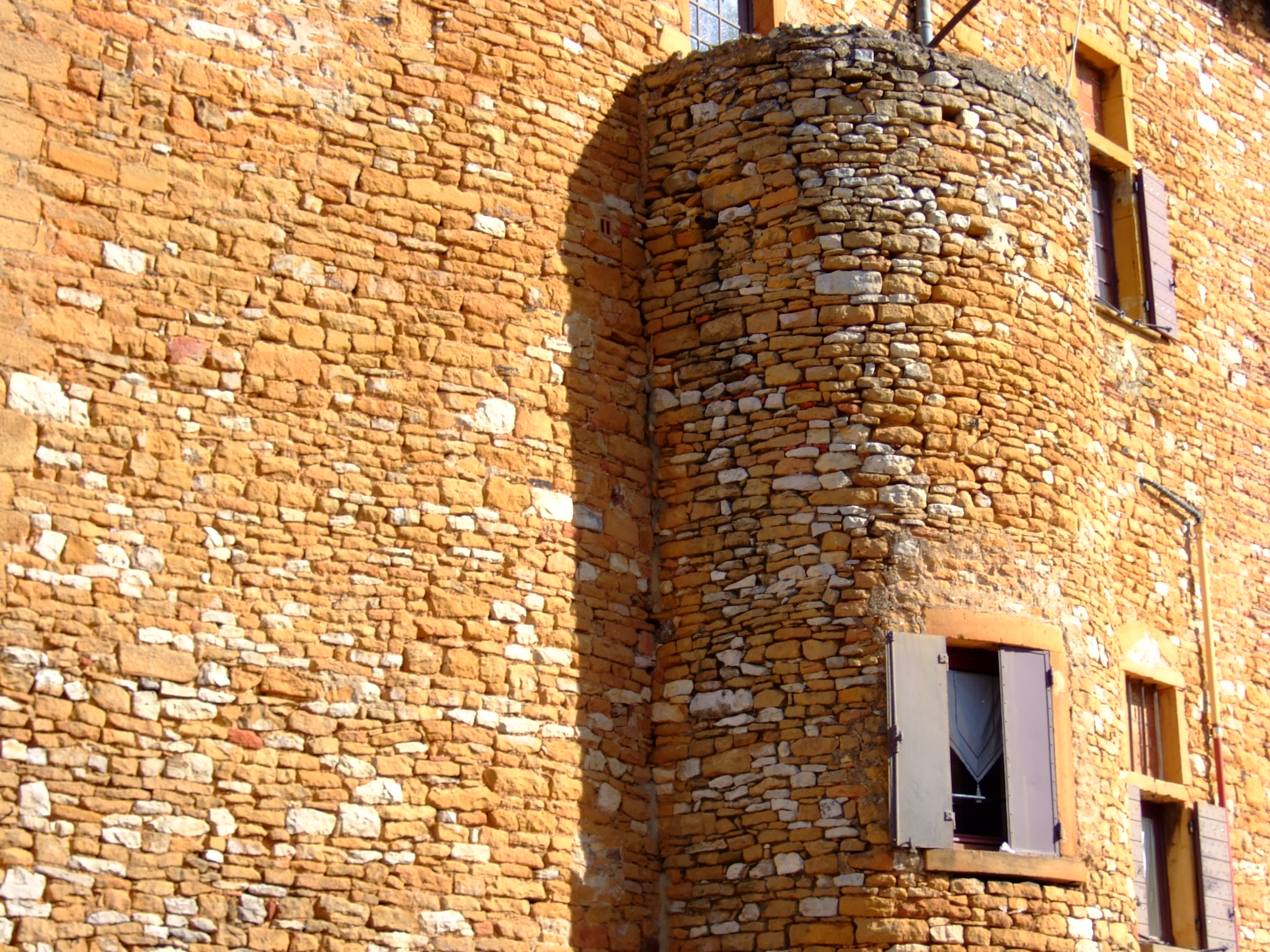
The medieval castle, built in golden colored stones

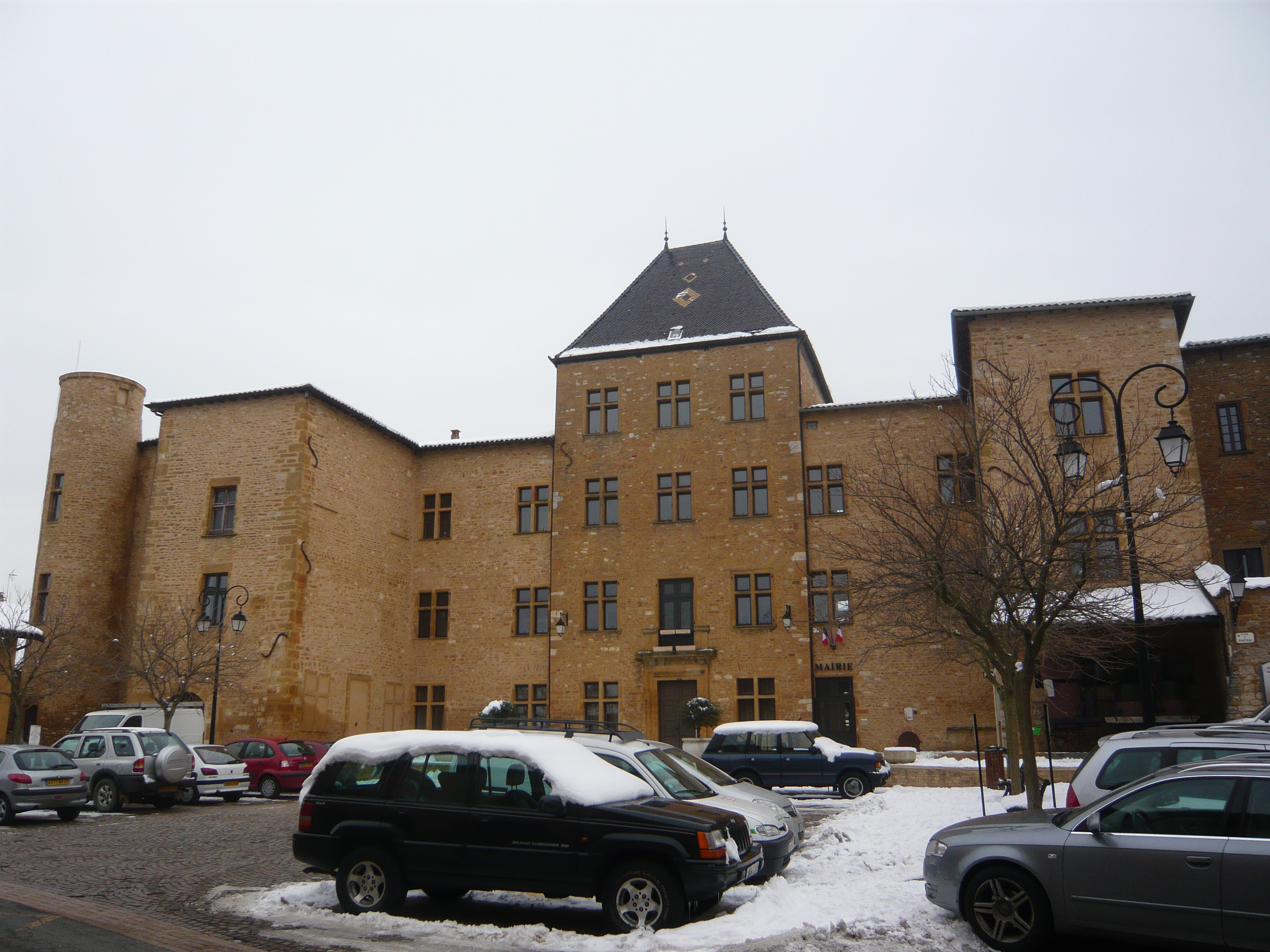
The medieval castle, now Charnay's city hall

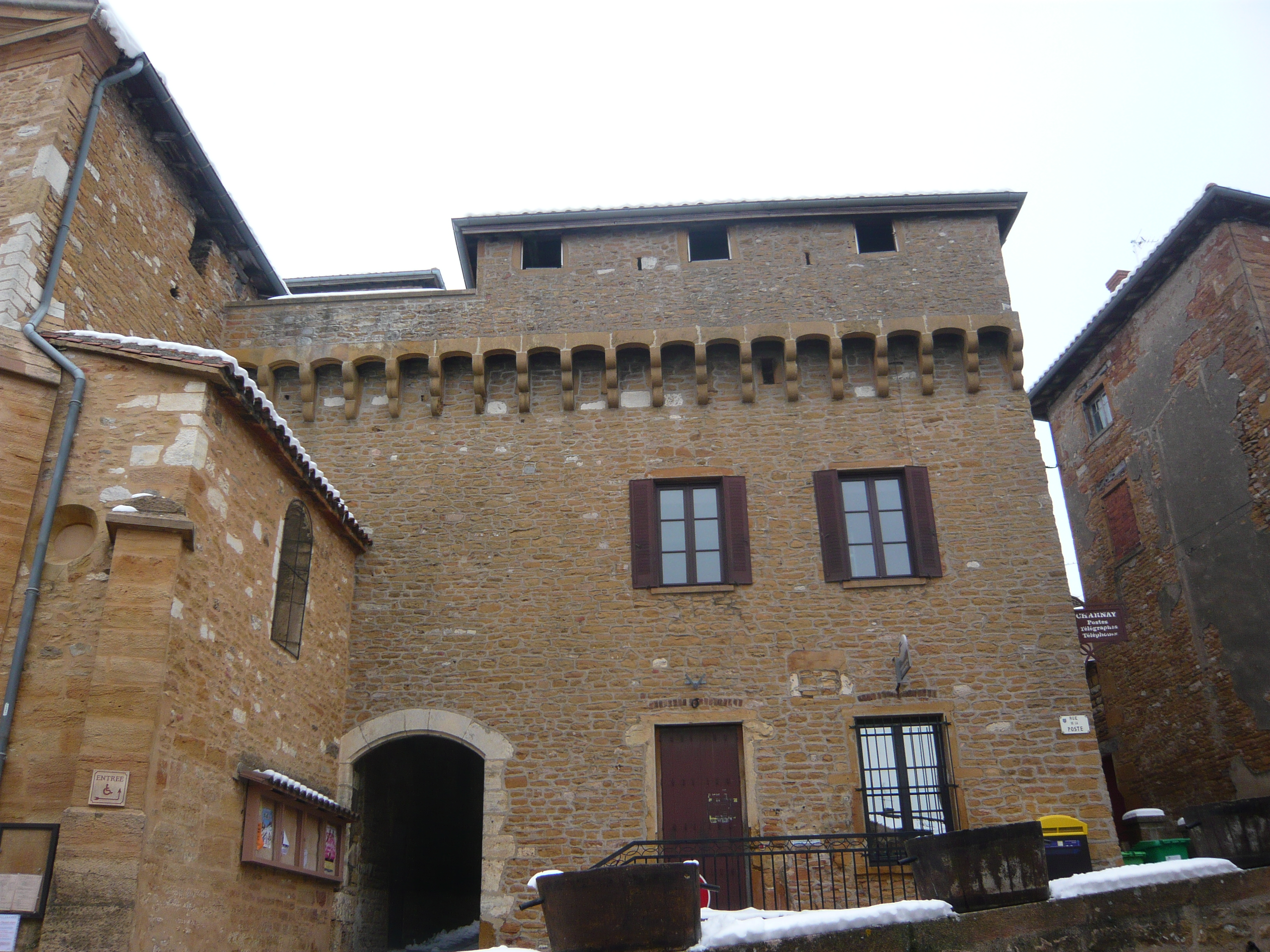
The medieval village

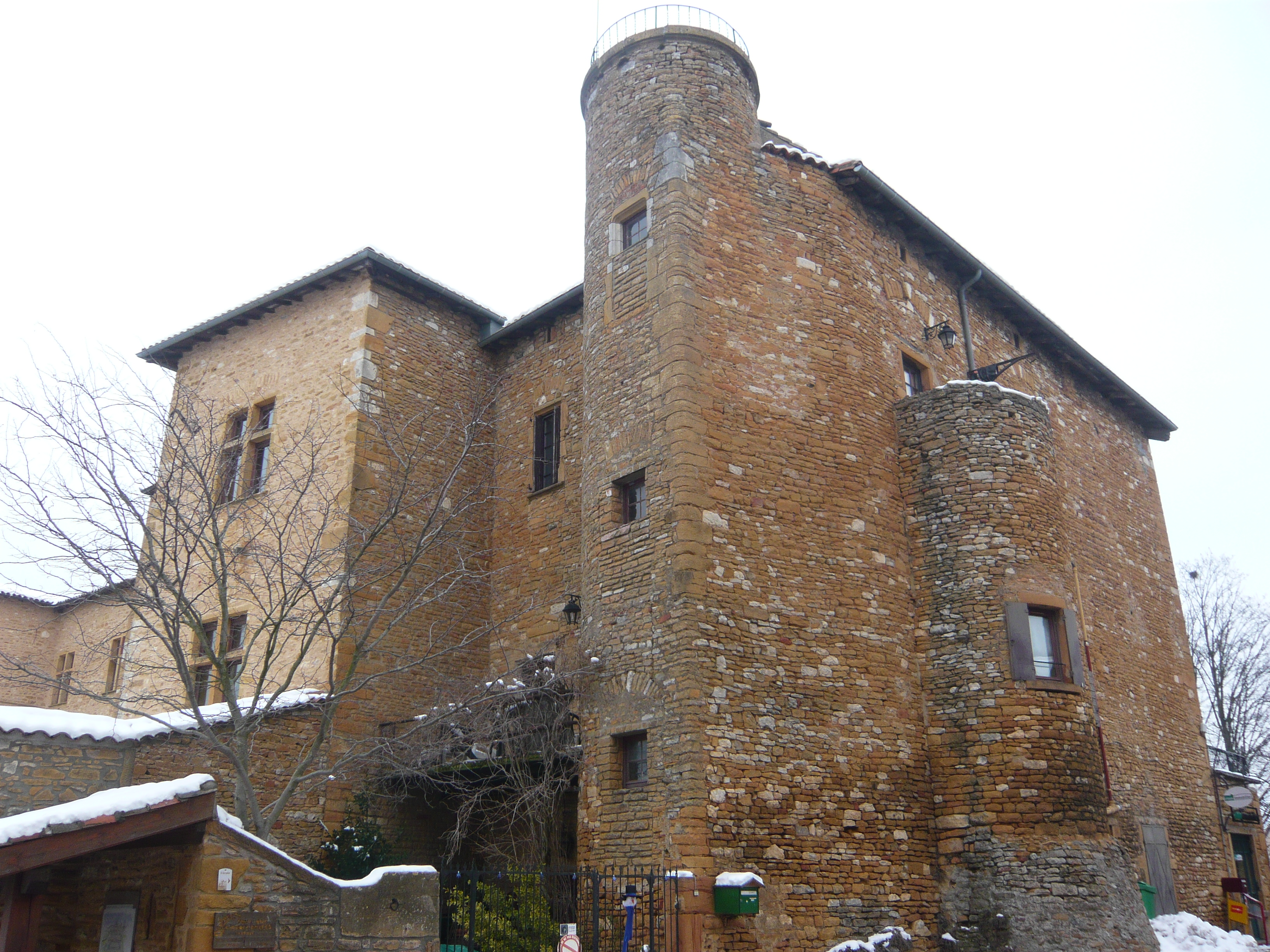
The medieval village

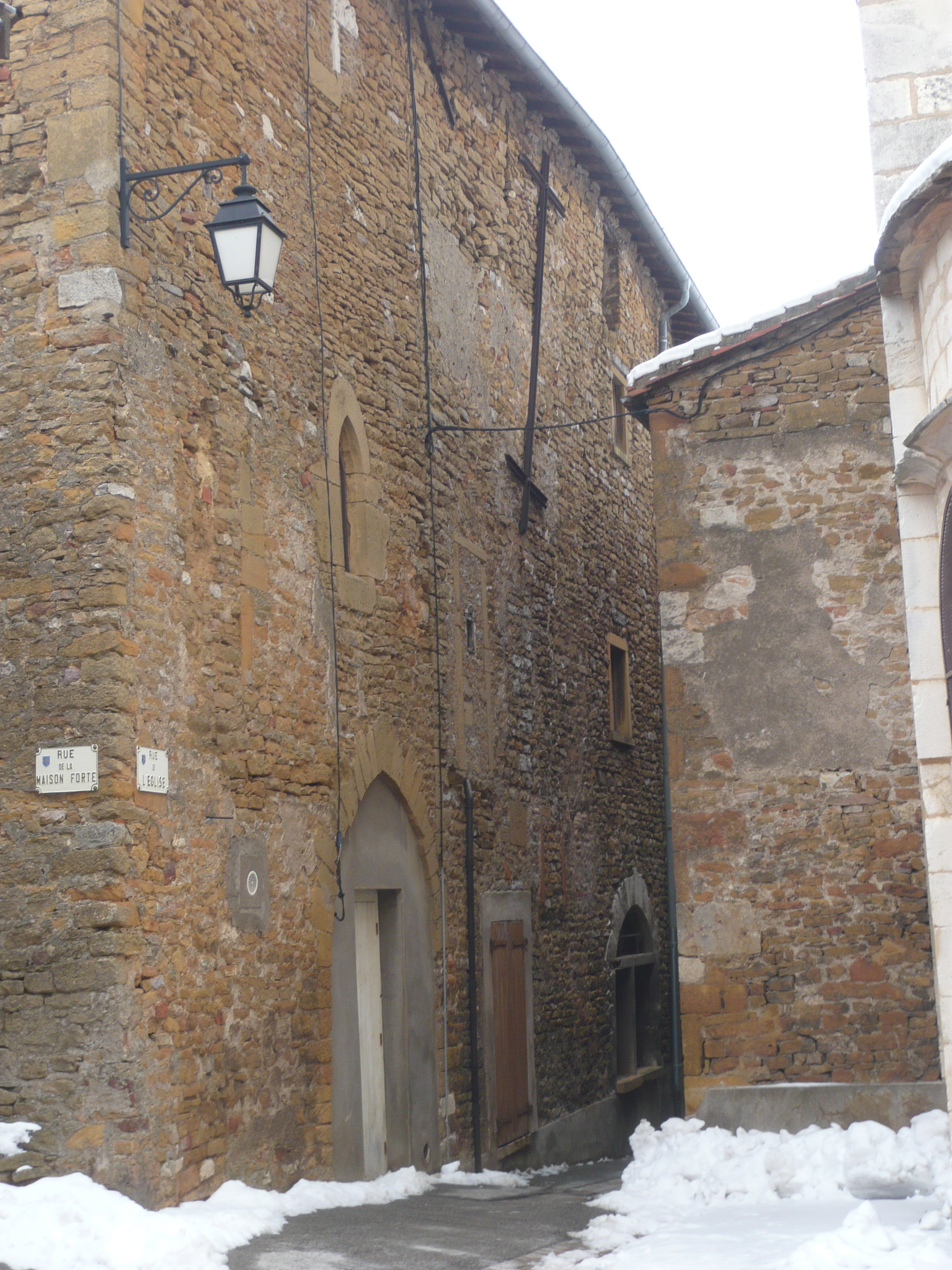
The medieval village

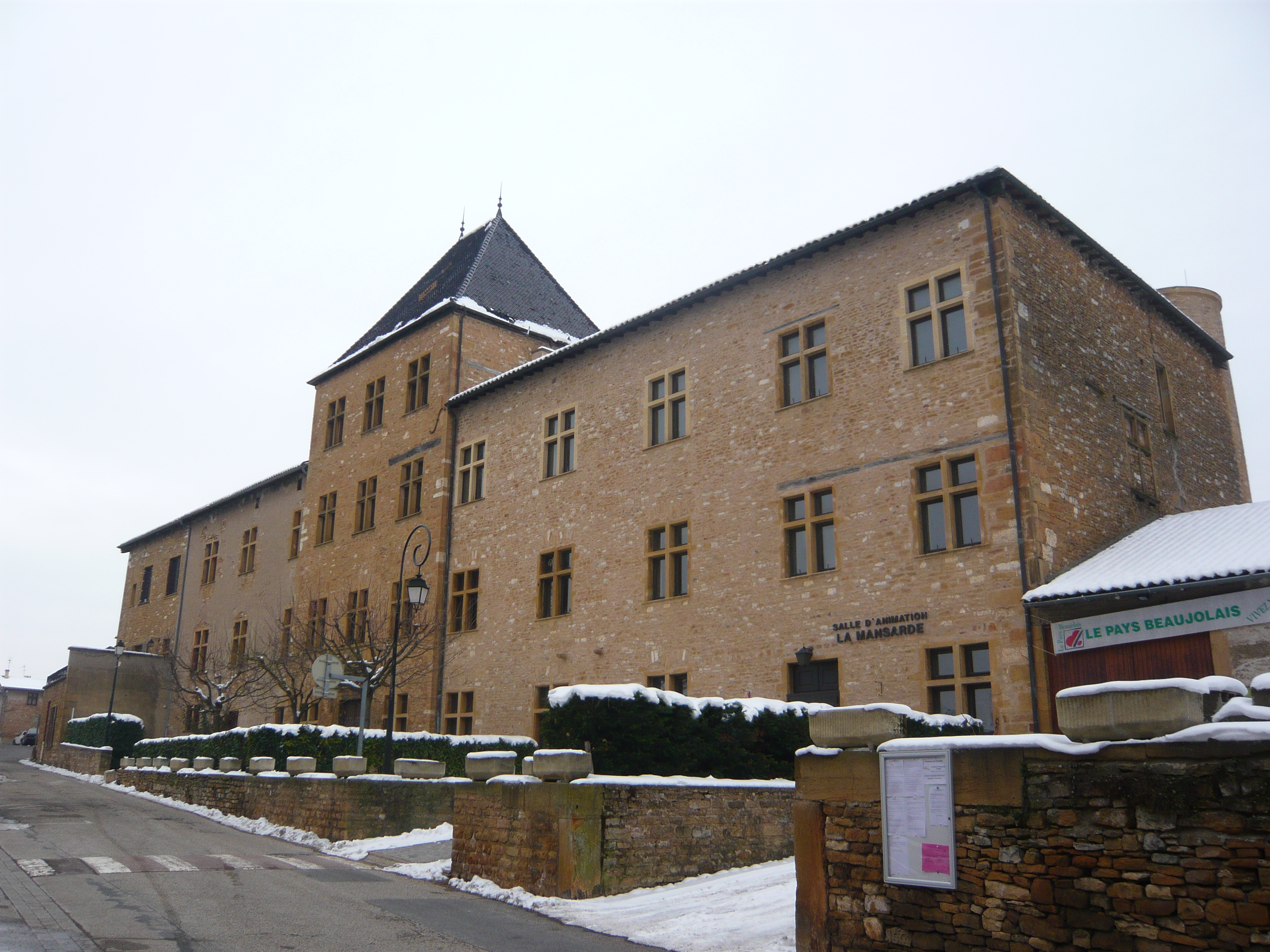
The Mansarde castle (16th century)

== See also ==
Communes of the Rhône department
