= Dommiers =

- Commune
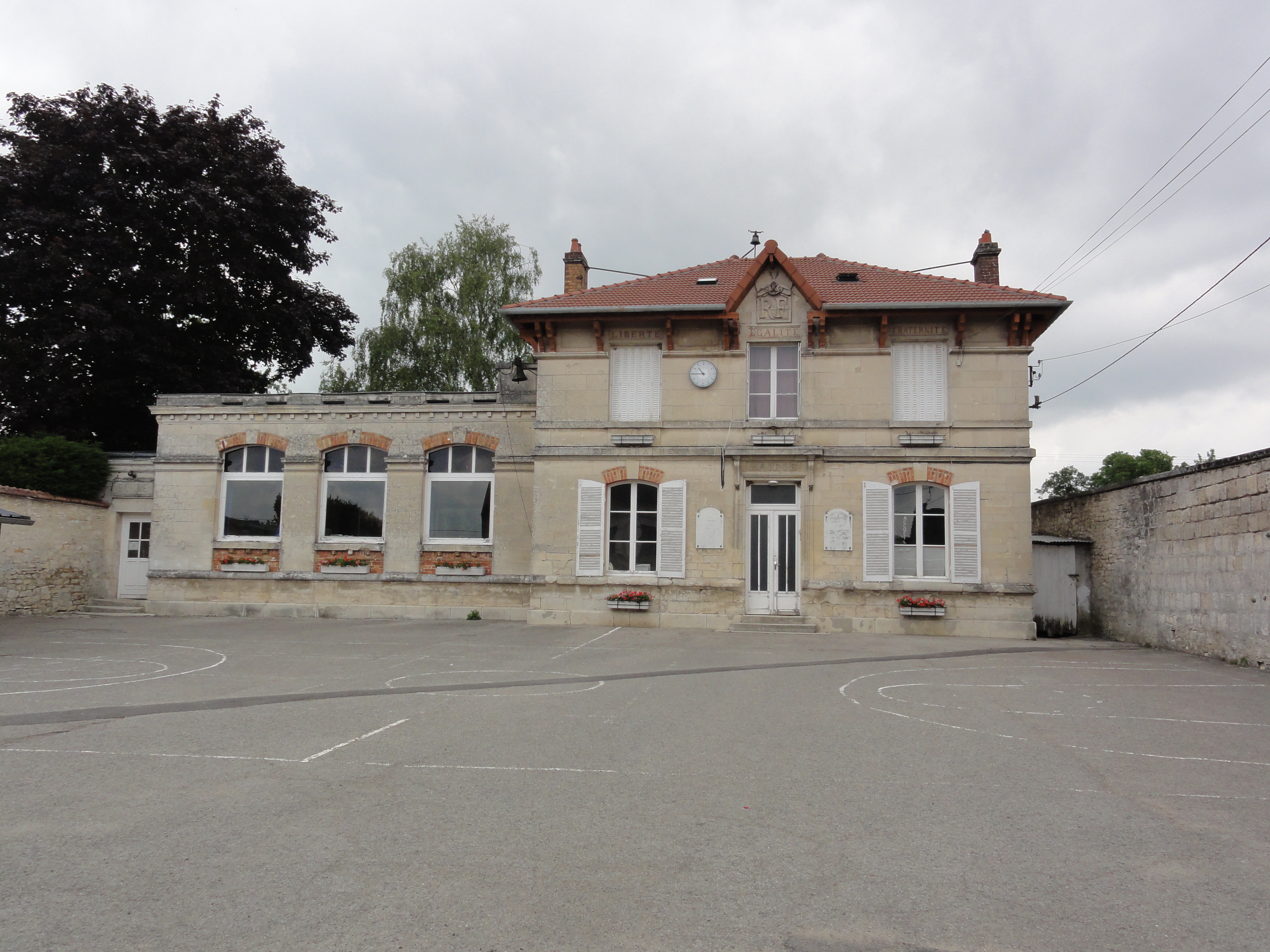
- The town hall and school of Dommiers
- Location of Dommiers
- Location within France Location within Hauts-de-France
- Coordinates: 49°19′40″N 3°12′36″E
- Country: France
- Region: Hauts-de-France
- Department: Aisne
- Arrondissement: Soissons
- Canton: Vic-sur-Aisne

Government
  - Mayor (2026–32): Christophe Pechon
- Area^{1}: 7.24 km^{2} (2.80 sq mi)
- Elevation: 140 m (460 ft)
- Highest elevation: 162 m (531 ft)
- Lowest elevation: 75 m (246 ft)
- Population (2023): 287
  - Density: 39.6/km^{2} (103/sq mi)
- Time zone: UTC+01:00 (CET)
  - Summer (DST): UTC+02:00 (CEST)
- INSEE/Postal code: 02267 /02600
- ^{1} French Land Register data, which excludes lakes, ponds, glaciers > 1 km^{2} (0.386 sq mi or 247 acres) and river estuaries.

Dommiers (French pronunciation: [dɔmje]) is a commune in the Aisne department in Hauts-de-France in northern France.

== Population ==
Historical population
Year	Pop.	±% p.a.
1968	260	—
1975	258	−0.11%
1982	221	−2.19%
1990	252	+1.65%
1999	279	+1.14%
2007	298	+0.83%
2012	290	−0.54%
2017	289	−0.07%
2023	287	−0.12%
Source: INSEE

== See also ==
- Communes of the Aisne department
