= Eugene Bullard =

First Black French and American military pilot (1895–1961)

Eugene Jacques Bullard
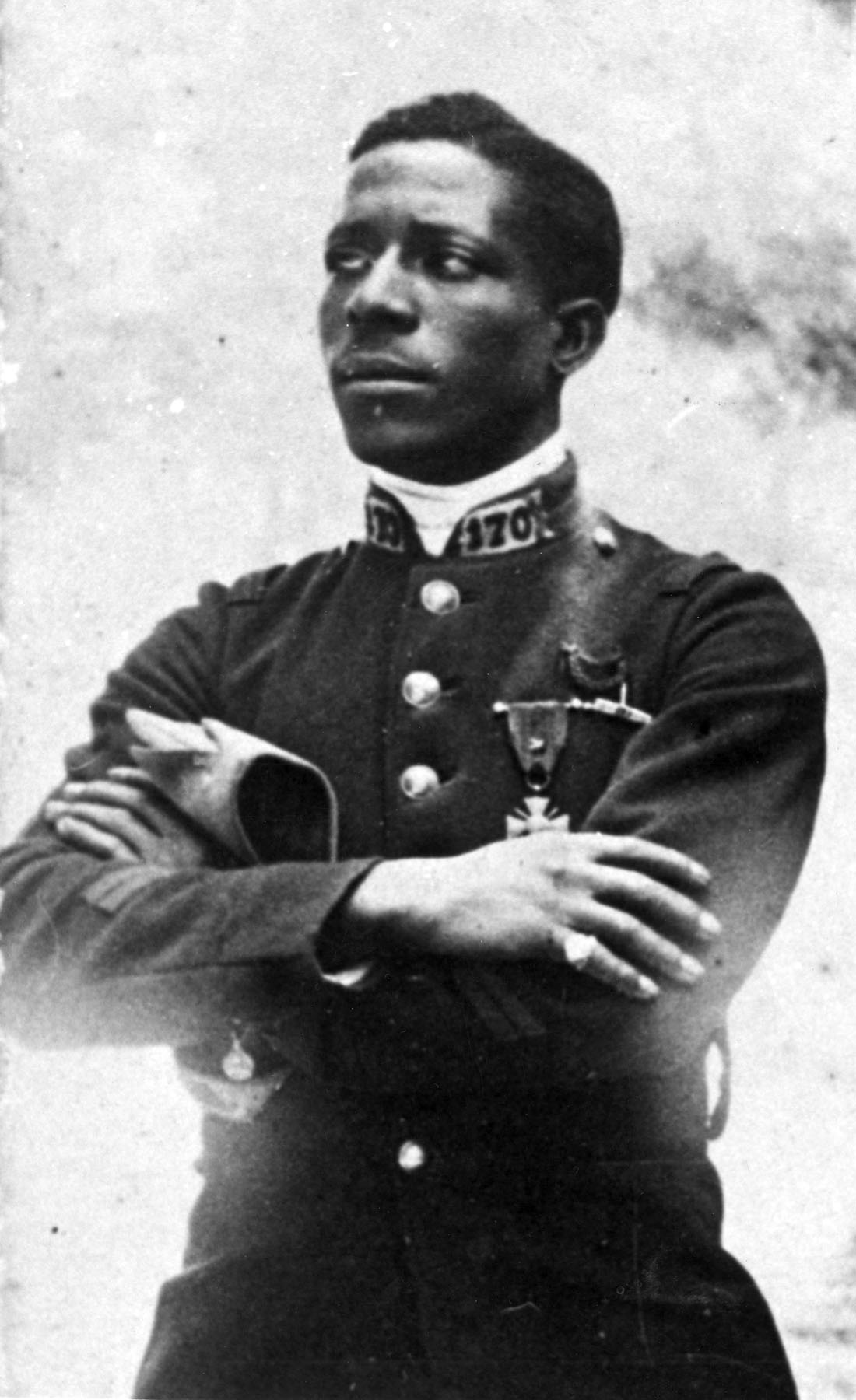
- Bullard in his uniform as a French Army caporal
- Born: October 9, 1895; Columbus, Georgia, U.S.
- Died: October 12, 1961 (aged 66); New York City, U.S.
- Burial place: Flushing Cemetery; 40°45′6″N 73°47′58″W
- Military career
- Allegiance: French Third Republic
- Branch: Foreign Legion; French Air Service; French Resistance
- Service years: 1914–1919, 1940
- Nicknames: French: l'Hirondelle noire de la mort, lit. 'Black Swallow of Death'
- Units: 170th French Infantry Regiment; 51^{e} Régiment d'Infanterie
- Conflicts: First World War; Second World War
- Awards: Légion d'honneur; Médaille militaire; Croix de guerre (WWI); Croix de guerre (WWII); Croix du combattant volontaire 1914–1918; Croix du combatant; Insigne des blessés militaires; Médaille Interalliée 1914–1918; Médaille commémorative de la guerre 1914–1918; Médaille commémorative de la guerre 1939–1945; Insignia for the Military Wounded

Eugene Jacques Bullard (born Eugene James Bullard; October 9, 1895 – October 12, 1961) was one of the first African-American military pilots, although Bullard flew for France, not the United States. Bullard was one of the few Black combat pilots during World War I (along with Pierre Réjon from France, William Robinson Clarke, a Jamaican who flew for the Royal Flying Corps, Domenico Mondelli from Italy, and Ahmet Ali Çelikten of the Ottoman Empire). Also a boxer and a jazz musician, he was called "L'Hirondelle noire" in French (literally "Black Swallow").

All Blood Runs Red, a biography of Bullard by Phil Keith and Tom Clavin, was published in 2019 by Hanover Square Press.

== Early life ==
Bullard was born in Columbus, Georgia, the seventh of 10 children born to William (Octave) Bullard, a Black man from Stewart County, Georgia, and Josephine ("Yokalee") Thomas, a Black woman said to be of African-American and Indigenous (Muscogee Creek) heritage. His paternal ancestors had been enslaved in Georgia and Virginia according to U.S. census records, and his father was born on a property owned by Wiley Bullard, a slave-owning planter in Stewart County. Bullard attended the 28th Street School in Columbus from 1901 to 1906, completing the fifth grade.

During his youth, he suffered the trauma of watching a white mob attempt to lynch his father over a workplace dispute. Despite the rampant racism of Jim Crow-era Georgia, his father continued to voice the conviction that African Americans had to maintain their dignity and self-respect in the face of the white prejudice. Despite this, Bullard became enamored with his father's stories of France, where slavery had been abolished and blacks were treated in the same way as whites. When Bullard reached his 11th birthday, he ran away from home with the intention of getting to France. Stopping in Atlanta, he joined a British clan of Romanis known by the surname of Stanley and traveled throughout Georgia tending their horses and learning to race. It was the Stanleys who told him how the racial barriers did not exist in Britain and reset his determination to now get to the United Kingdom.

Disheartened that the Stanleys were not scheduled to return to the United Kingdom, Bullard found work with the Turner family in Dawson, Georgia. Because he was hard-working as a stable boy, young Bullard won the Turners' affection and was asked to ride as their jockey in the 1911 County Fair races. In 1912, he made his way to Norfolk, Virginia, where he stowed away on the German freighter Marta Russ, hoping to escape racial discrimination. Bullard arrived at Aberdeen, Scotland, and made his way first to Glasgow and then to London, where he boxed and performed slapstick in Belle Davis's "Freedman Pickaninnies", an African-American troupe. While in London, he trained under the then-famous boxer Dixie Kid, who arranged for him to fight in Paris, France. As a result of that visit to Paris, Bullard decided to settle in France. He continued to box in Paris and also worked in a music hall until the start of World War I.

== World War I ==
=== Marching Regiment of the Foreign Legion ===
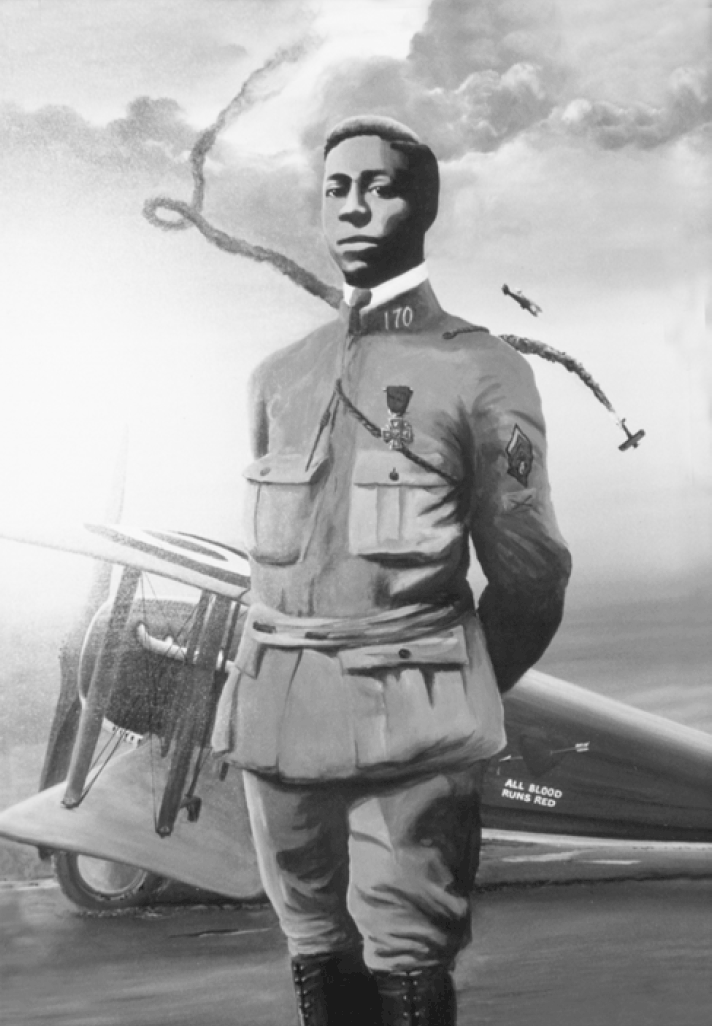
Bullard during World War I

World War I began in August 1914. On October 19, 1914, Bullard enlisted and was assigned to the 3rd Marching Regiment of the Foreign Legion (R.M.L.E.), as foreign volunteers were allowed only to serve in the Foreign Legion.

By 1915, Bullard was a machine gunner and saw combat on the Somme front in Picardy. In May and June, he was at Artois, and in the fall of that year fought in the Second Battle of Champagne (September 25 – November 6, 1915) along the Meuse River. He was assigned to the 3rd Marching Regiment of the 1st Foreign Regiment. On July 13, 1915, he joined the 2nd Marching Regiment of the 1st Foreign Regiment and also served with the 170th French Infantry Regiment. The 2nd Marching Regiment of the 1st Foreign Regiment and the 2nd Marching Regiment of the 2nd Foreign Regiment were serving as part of the 1st Moroccan Division. Commanded initially by Hubert Lyautey, Resident-General of Morocco at the outbreak of World War I, the division was a mix of the Metropolitan and Colonial French troops, including Legionnaires, zouaves and tirailleurs. Towards the end of the war, the 1st Moroccan Division became one of the most decorated units in the French Army. The Foreign Legion suffered high casualties in 1915. It started the year with 21,887 soldiers, NCOs, and officers, but ended with only 10,683. As a result, the Foreign Legion units fighting on the Western front were put in reserve for reinforcement and reorganization. On November 11, 1915, the 3,316 survivors from the 1^{e} and the 2^{e} Étranger were merged into one unit – the Marching Regiment of the Foreign Legion (Régiment de Marche de la Légion étrangère), which in 1920 became the 3rd Foreign Regiment of the Foreign Legion. Bullard participated in the fighting on the Somme, Champagne, and Verdun, where he was severely wounded on March 5, 1916.

The Americans and other volunteers were allowed to transfer to the Metropolitan French Army units, including to the 170th French Infantry Regiment. The 170th had a reputation as crack troops, being nicknamed Les Hirondelles de la Mort (in English, 'The Swallows of Death'). Bullard opted to serve in the 170th Infantry Regiment, and the 170 military insignia is displayed on his uniform collar. At the start of 1916, the 170th Infantry along with the 48th French Infantry Division, to which the regiment belonged from February 1915 to December 1916, was sent to Verdun. During his convalescence, Bullard was cited for acts of valor at the orders of the regiment on July 3, 1917, and was awarded the croix de guerre.

=== Aviation ===
While serving with the 170th Infantry, Bullard was seriously wounded in action in March 1916 at the Battle of Verdun. While recuperating, he learned to fly on a bet. After recovering, he volunteered on October 2, 1916, for the French Air Service (French: Aéronautique Militaire) as an air gunner. He was accepted and underwent training at the Aerial Gunnery School in Cazaux, Gironde. Following this, he went through his initial flight training at Châteauroux and Avord, and received pilot's license number 6950 from the Aéro-Club de France on May 5, 1917.

Like many other American aviators, Bullard hoped to join the famous squadron Escadrille Americaine N.124, the Lafayette Escadrille, but after enrolling 38 American pilots in the spring and summer of 1916, the squadron stopped accepting applicants. After further training at Avord, Bullard joined 269 American aviators at the Lafayette Flying Corps on November 15, 1916, which was a designation for all American pilots who served with the French Air Service, rather than the name of a specific unit. American volunteers flew with French pilots in different pursuit and bomber/reconnaissance aero squadrons on the Western Front. Edmund L. Gros, who facilitated the incorporation of American pilots in the French Air Service, listed in the October 1917 issue of Flying, an official publication of the Aero Club of America, Bullard's name is on the member roster of the Lafayette Flying Corps.

On June 28, 1917, Bullard was promoted to corporal. On August 27, he was assigned to Escadrille N.93 (French: Escadrille SPA 93), based at Beauzée-sur-Aire, south of Verdun, where he stayed until September 13. The squadron was equipped with Nieuport and Spad aircraft that displayed a flying stork/swan as the squadron insignia. Bullard's service record also includes Squadron N.85 (French: Escadrille SPA 85), September 13, 1917 – November 11, 1917, which had a bull insignia. He took part in more than twenty combat missions, and he is sometimes credited with shooting down one or two German aircraft (sources differ). However, the French authorities could not confirm Bullard's victories.

When the United States entered the war, the United States Army Air Service convened a medical board to recruit Americans serving in the Lafayette Flying Corps for the Air Service of the American Expeditionary Forces. Bullard went through the medical examination, but he was not accepted, as only white pilots were chosen. Some time later, while on a short break from duty in Paris, Bullard allegedly got into an argument with a French commissioned officer and was punished by being transferred to the service battalion of the French 170th Infantry Regiment in January 1918. He served beyond the Armistice, not being discharged until October 24, 1919.

== Interwar years ==
For his World War I service, the French government awarded Bullard the Croix de guerre, Médaille militaire, Croix du combattant volontaire 1914–1918, and Médaille de Verdun, along with several others. After his discharge, Bullard returned again to Paris.

Bullard found work for four years as a jazz drummer in a nightclub named "Zelli's", which was owned by Joe Zelli. Bullard worked with Robert Henri, a lawyer and friend, to secure a club license, which allowed Zelli's to stay open past midnight. This led to Zelli's becoming the most celebrated nightclub in Montmartre, as most other area cabarets still closed at midnight. Following his time at Zelli's, Bullard departed for Alexandria, Egypt, where he performed with a jazz ensemble at Hotel Claridge and fought two prize fights. He also hired musicians for private parties with Paris' social elites, worked as a masseur, and an exercise trainer. Bullard later managed a nightclub "Le Grand Duc", where he hired the American poet Langston Hughes. Around 1928, Bullard was able to buy "Le Grand Duc" from Ada "Bricktop" Smith. As a popular jazz venue, "Le Grand Duc" gained him many famous friends, including Josephine Baker, Louis Armstrong, Langston Hughes, and French flying ace Charles Nungesser. He eventually became the owner of another nightclub, "L'Escadrille". Bullard's Montmartre fame was such that Ernest Hemingway based a minor character on Bullard in his 1926 novel The Sun Also Rises.

Bullard also opened Bullard's Athletic Club, which was a gymnasium offering physical culture, boxing, massage, ping pong and hydrotherapy. He also worked as a trainer for noted boxers Panama Al Brown and Young Perez.

On July 17, 1923, he married Marcelle Eugénie Henriette Straumann, (b. July 8, 1901) a milliner from Paris' second arrondissement. They later separated, though they did not divorce because both were Catholics.

When World War II began in September 1939, Bullard, who also spoke German, agreed to a request from the French government to spy on the German citizens who still frequented his nightclub.

== World War II ==
Following the German invasion of France in May 1940, Bullard volunteered and served with the 51st Infantry Regiment (French: 51^{e} Régiment d'Infanterie) in defending Orléans on June 15, 1940. Bullard was wounded, but he escaped to neutral Spain, and in July 1940 he returned to the United States.

Bullard spent some time in a New York hospital and never fully recovered from his wound. Moreover, he found the fame he enjoyed in France had not followed him to the United States. He worked as a perfume salesman, a security guard, and as an interpreter for Louis Armstrong, but a back injury severely restricted him. In 1945, he attempted to regain his nightclub in Paris, but it had been destroyed during the war. He received a financial settlement from the French government and was able to buy an apartment in Harlem, New York City.

== Peekskill riots ==
In 1949, a concert by Black actor, singer and activist Paul Robeson in Peekskill, New York, to benefit the Civil Rights Congress ended in the Peekskill riots. These were caused in part by members of the local Veterans of Foreign Wars and American Legion posts, who considered Robeson a communist sympathizer. The concert was scheduled to take place on August 27 at Lakeland Acres, north of Peekskill. Before Robeson arrived, however, a mob attacked the concert-goers with baseball bats and stones. Thirteen people were seriously injured before police put an end to it. The concert was then postponed until September 4. The rescheduled concert took place without incident, but as concert-goers drove away, they passed through long lines of hostile locals, who threw rocks through their windshields.

Bullard was among those attacked after the concert. He was knocked to the ground and beaten by an angry mob, which included members of the state and local law enforcement. The attack was captured on film and can be seen in the 1970s documentary The Tallest Tree in Our Forest and in the Oscar-winning documentary narrated by Sidney Poitier, Paul Robeson: Tribute to an Artist. None of the assailants were prosecuted. Graphic pictures of Bullard being beaten by two policemen, a state trooper, and a concert goer were published in Susan Robeson's biography of her grandfather, The Whole World in His Hands: a Pictorial Biography of Paul Robeson.

== Later life and death ==
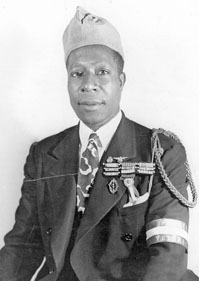
Bullard in his later years, wearing on his shoulder the croix de guerre Fourragère, 170th Regiment distinction, and the cap of French war veterans

In the 1950s, Bullard was a relative stranger in his own homeland. His daughters had married, and he lived alone in his apartment, which was decorated with pictures of his famous friends and a framed case containing his 14 French war medals. His final job was as an elevator operator at the Rockefeller Center, where his fame as the "Black Swallow of Death" was unknown. On December 22, 1959, he was interviewed on NBC's Today Show by Dave Garroway and received hundreds of letters from viewers. Bullard wore his elevator operator uniform during the interview.

Bullard died in New York City of stomach cancer on October 12, 1961, at the age of 66. He was buried with military honors in the French War Veterans' section of Flushing Cemetery in the New York City borough of Queens. His friend Louis Armstrong is buried in the same cemetery.

== Honors ==
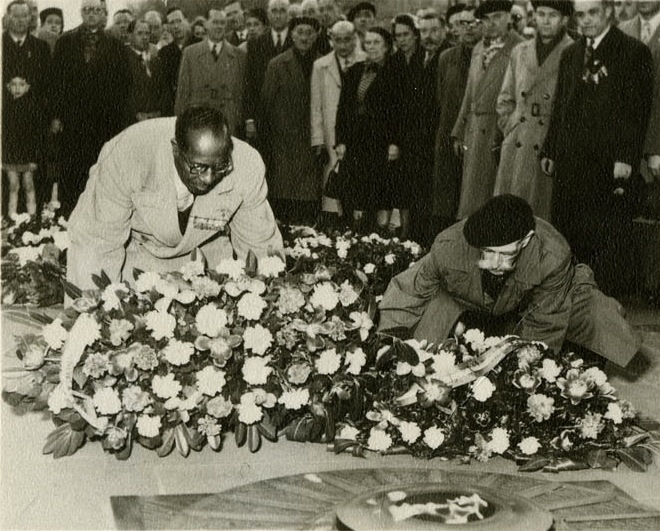
Bullard at the Tomb of the Unknown Soldier in Paris, 1954

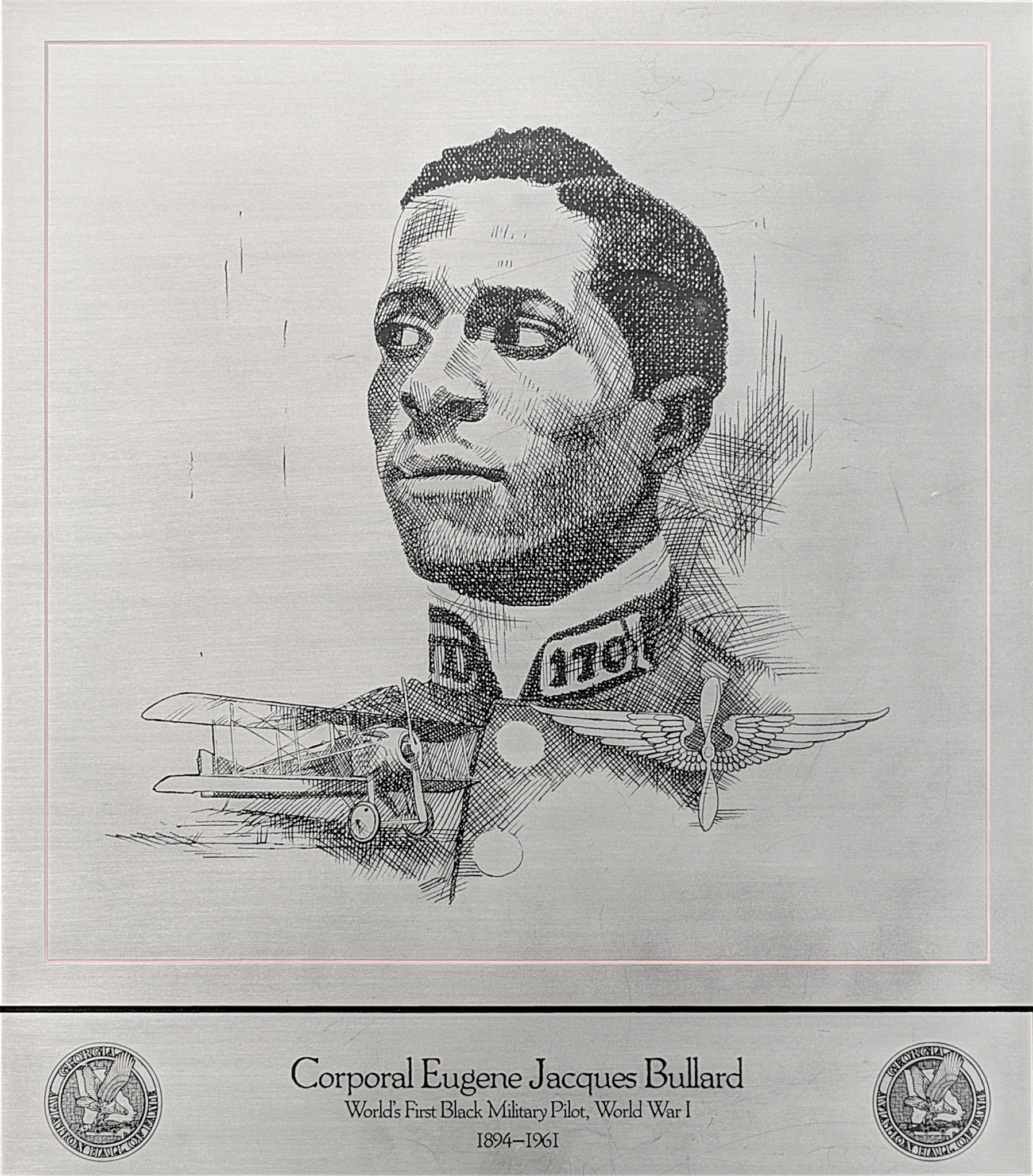
Plaque of Bullard at the Georgia Aviation Hall of Fame

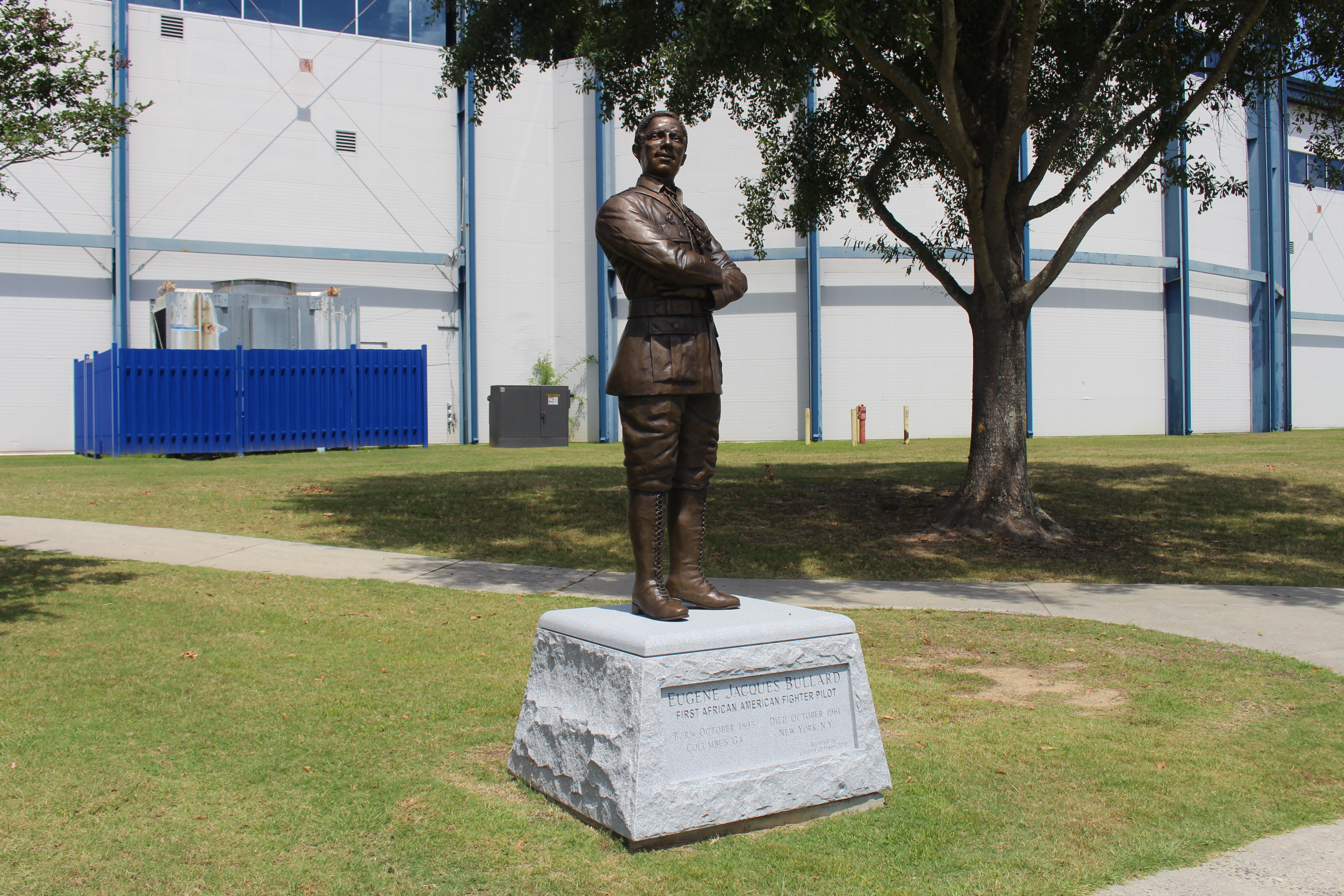
Statue at the Museum of Aviation (Warner Robins)

Bullard received 14 decorations and medals from the government of France. In 1954, the French government invited Bullard to Paris to be one of the three men chosen to rekindle the everlasting flame at the Tomb of the Unknown Soldier under the Arc de Triomphe. In 1959, he was made a Chevalier (Knight) of the Légion d'honneur by General Charles de Gaulle, who called Bullard a "véritable héros français" ("true French hero"). He also was awarded the Médaille militaire, another high military distinction.

In 1989, he was posthumously inducted into the inaugural class of the Georgia Aviation Hall of Fame. On August 23, 1994 – 33 years after his death, and 77 years to the day after the physical that should have allowed him to fly for his own country – Bullard was posthumously commissioned a second lieutenant in the United States Air Force.

On October 9, 2019, the Museum of Aviation in Warner Robins, Georgia, erected a statue in Bullard's honor.

There is a sign in Columbus, Georgia, near the site of the house where Bullard grew up, which describes his early life.

In 2022, Bullard was inducted with the class of 2020 into The National Aviation Hall of Fame in Dayton, Ohio.

=== Decorations and medals ===

1st row :

- Chevalier de la Légion d'honneur (Knight of the Legion of Honor)
- Médaille militaire (Military Medal)

2nd row :

- Croix de guerre 1914–1918 avec etoile de bronze (War Cross with bronze star)
- Croix du combattant volontaire 1914–1918 (Volunteer Combatant Cross)
- Croix du combatant (Combatant's Cross)
- Médaille des blessés militaires (Medal for Military Wounded)

3rd row :

- Médaille commémorative de la guerre 1914–1918 (World War Service Medal)
- Médaille interalliée 1914–1918, dite de la Victoire (Interallied Victory Medal)
- Médaille engagé volontaire (Voluntary Enlistment Medal)
- Médaille commémorative de la bataille de Verdun (Battle of Verdun Medal)

4th row :

- Médaille commémorative de la bataille de la Somme (Battle of the Somme Medal)
- Médaille commémorative de la guerre 1939–1945 (World War II Service Medal)
- Médaille commémorative des services volontaires de la France libre (Voluntary Service to Free France)
- Médaille des volontaires américains avec l'Armée Française (American Volunteer with French Army Medal)

In addition to the above awards, Bullard also received the French Pilot's Badge and the fourragere unit award.

Note – Bullard was posthumously eligible for the World War I Victory Medal (United States) as he was posthumously commissioned an officer in the United States Army with a date of rank that fell during the eligibility period of the medal.

== In popular culture ==
In 1972, Bullard's exploits as a pilot were retold in a biography, The Black Swallow of Death by Patrick Carisella and James Ryan. Bullard is also the subject of the nonfiction young adult memoir Eugene Bullard: World's First Black Fighter Pilot by Larry Greenly.

The 2006 movie Flyboys loosely portrays a fictionalization of Bullard, called 'Eugene Skinner' played by British actor Abdul Salis.

In 2012–2014, the French writer Claude Ribbe wrote a book on Bullard and made a television documentary.

In the 2012 movie Red Tails, the fictional Col. A. J. Bullard (played by Terrence Howard), a thinly disguised representation of the World War II African-American Tuskegee Airmen's main commander, Lt. Col. (later Gen.) Benjamin O. Davis Jr., is given that surname in honor of Eugene Bullard.

In 2020, the progressive rock/metal project Telergy released the album Black Swallow, which portrays the life of Eugene Bullard.

In 2023, Now Let Me Fly, a biographical graphical novel of Bullard's life, was published by First Second publishing house.

== Gallery ==
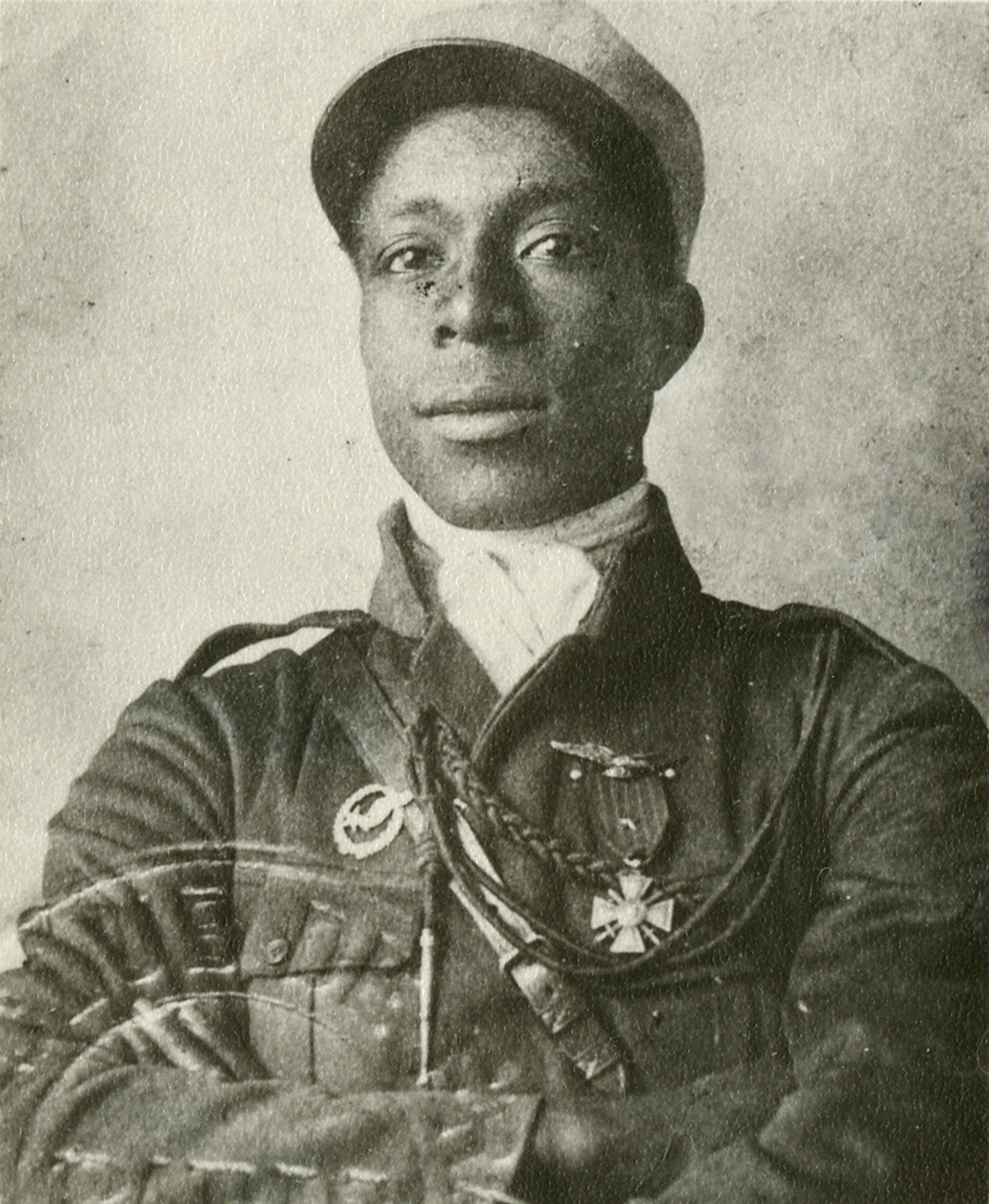
Bullard in his Legionnaire uniform, between 1914 and 1917

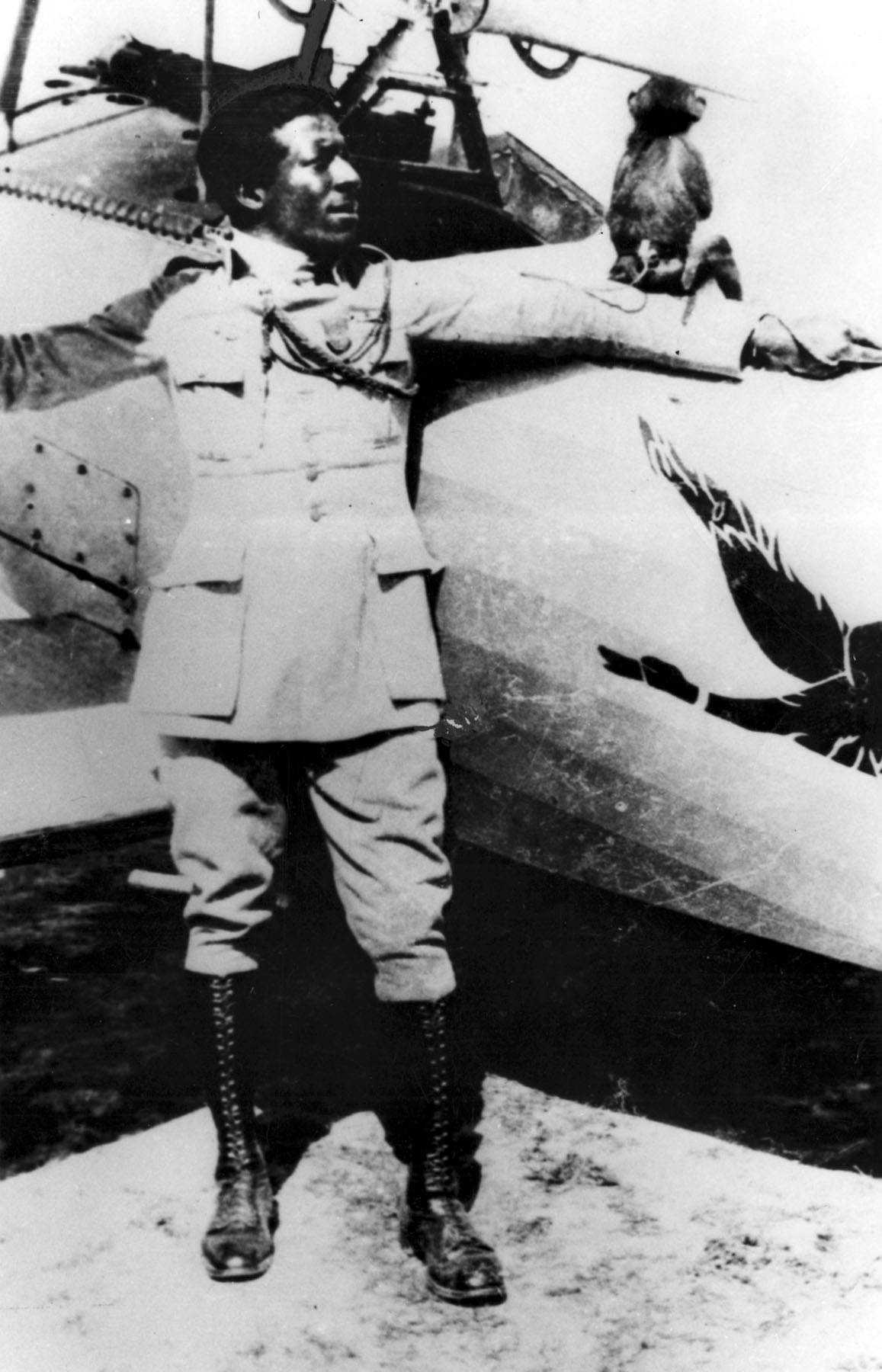
Bullard beside a Nieuport aircraft in 1917, while with Escadrille 93

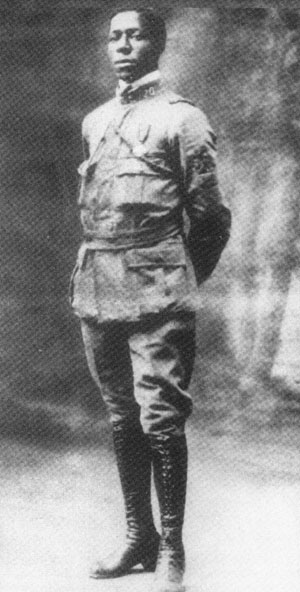
Bullard in January 1918

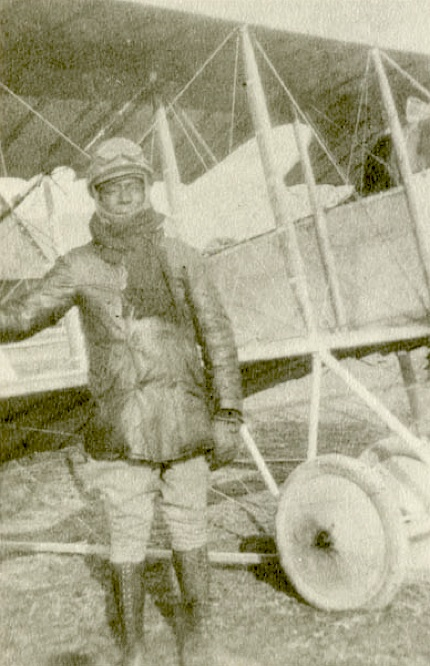
Bullard beside a Caudron trainer

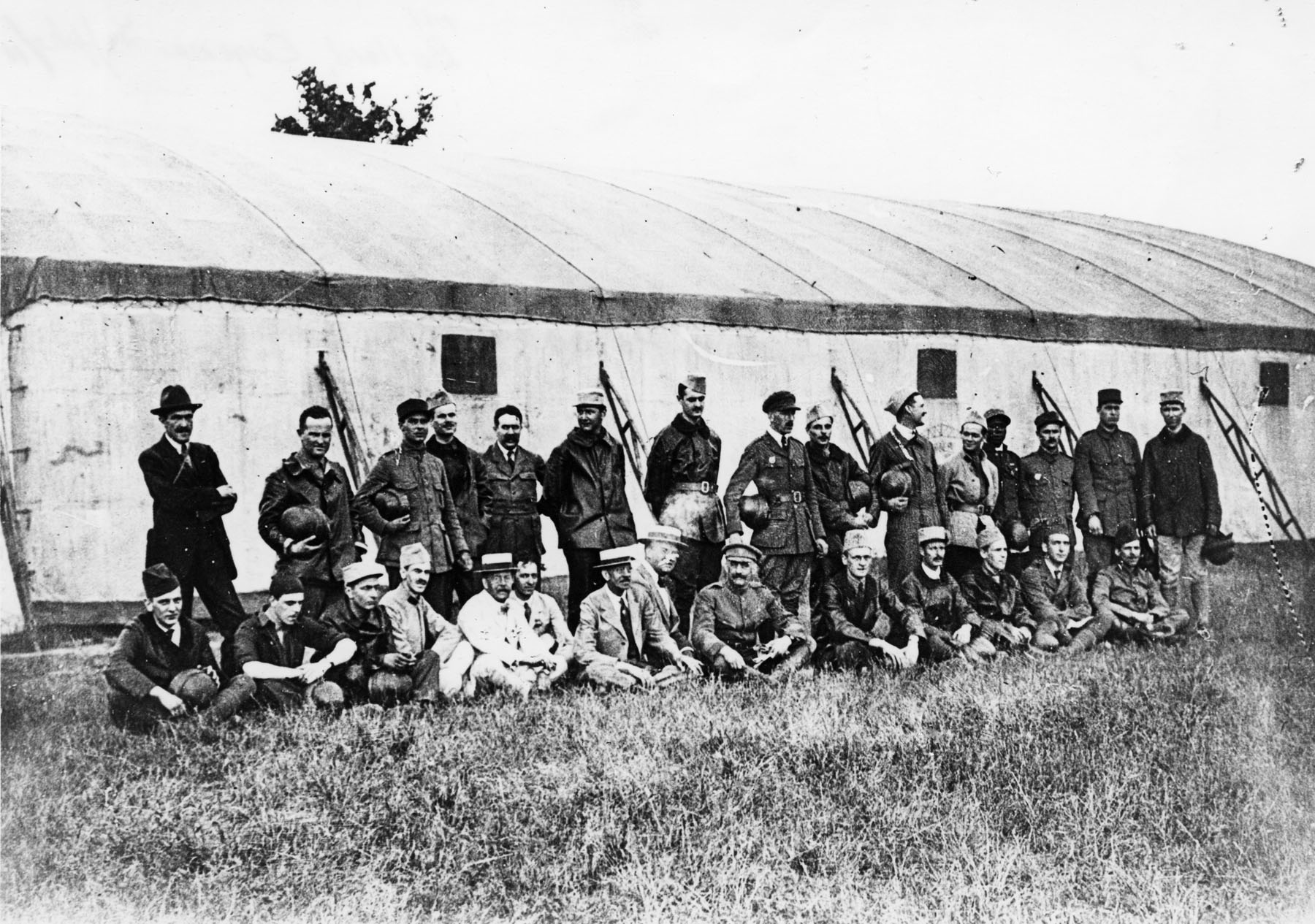
Bullard in a group photo

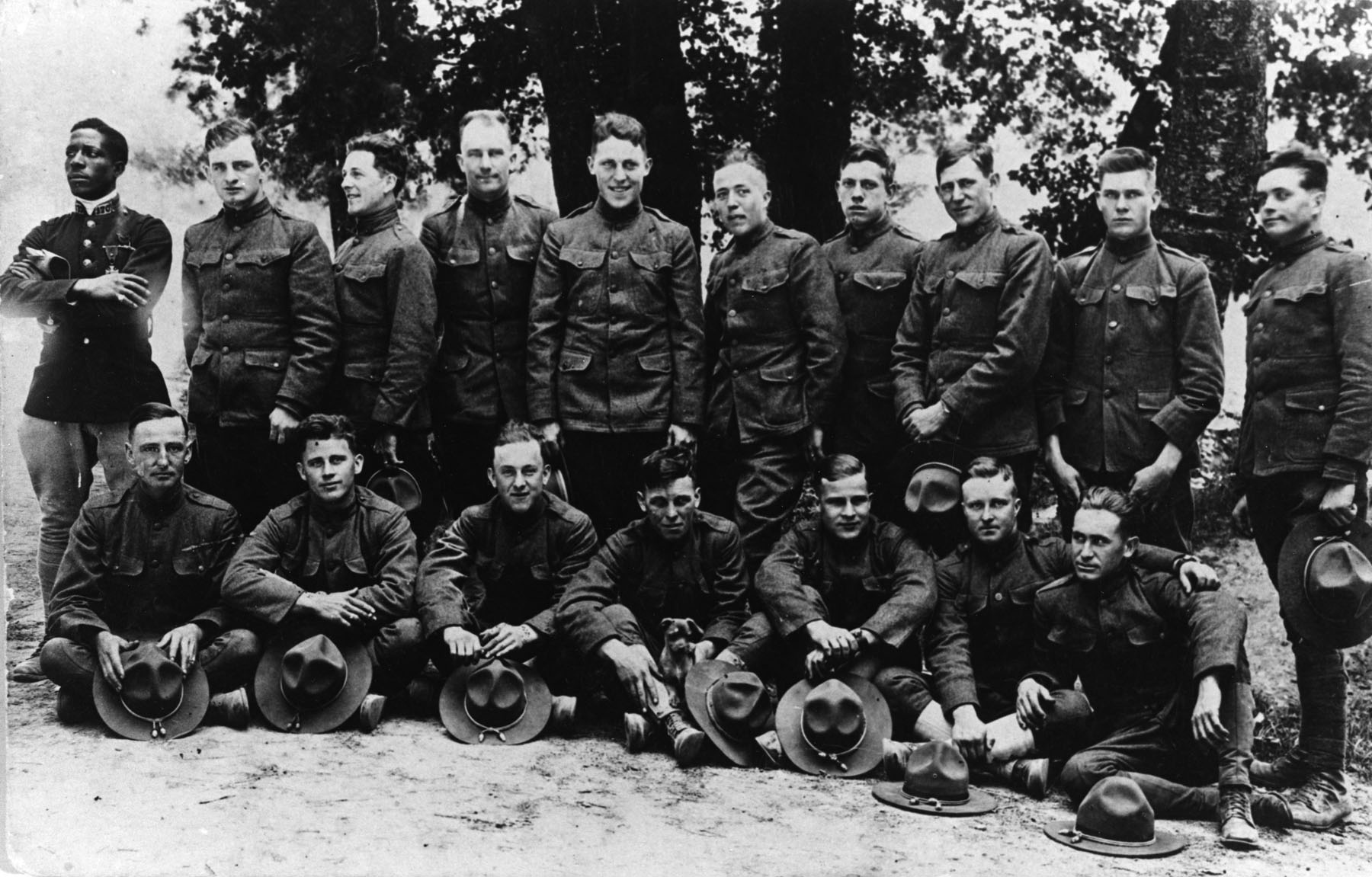
Bullard in a group photo

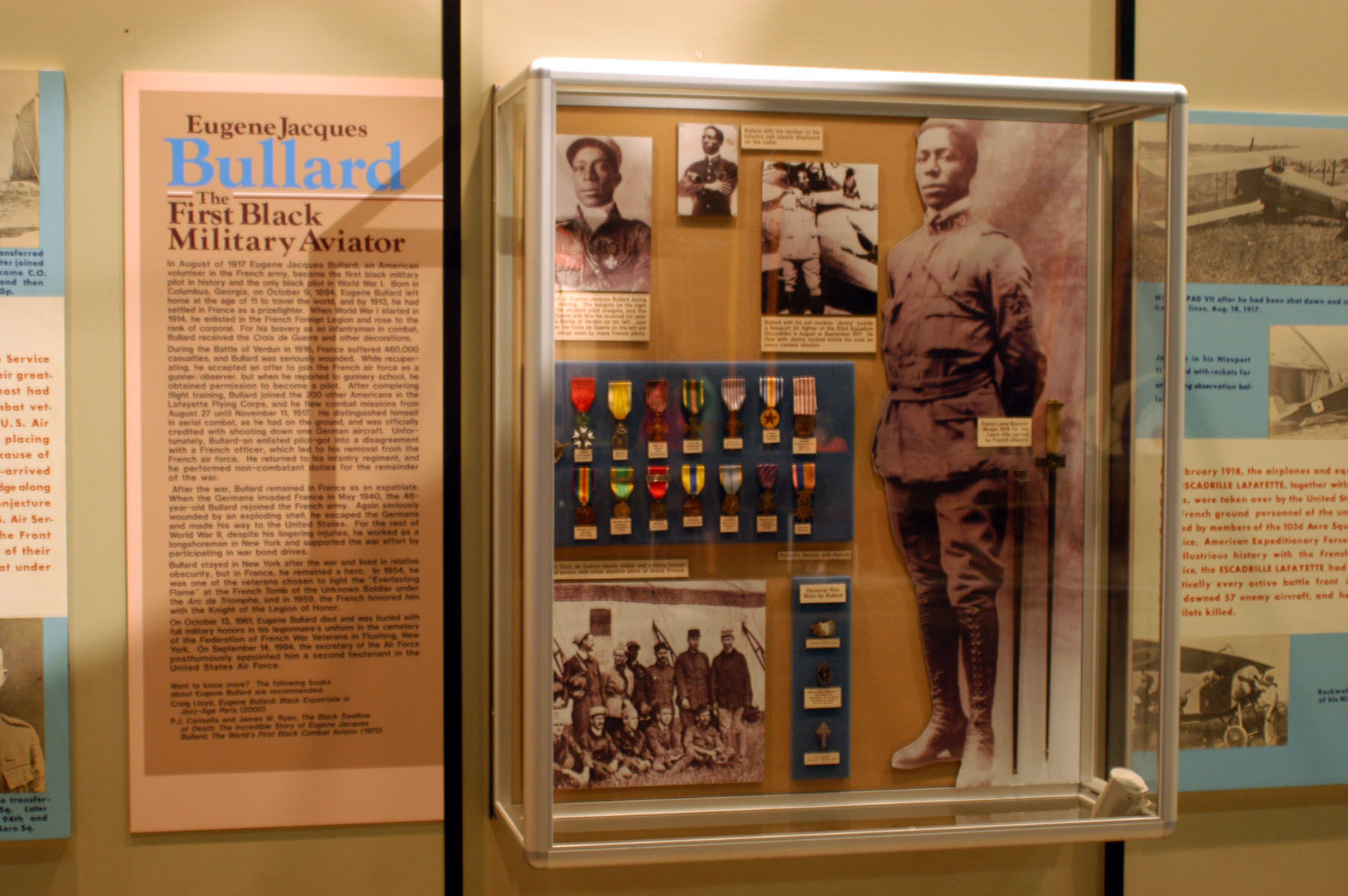
Bullard exhibit at the National Museum of the United States Air Force

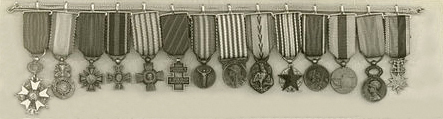
Bullard's awards

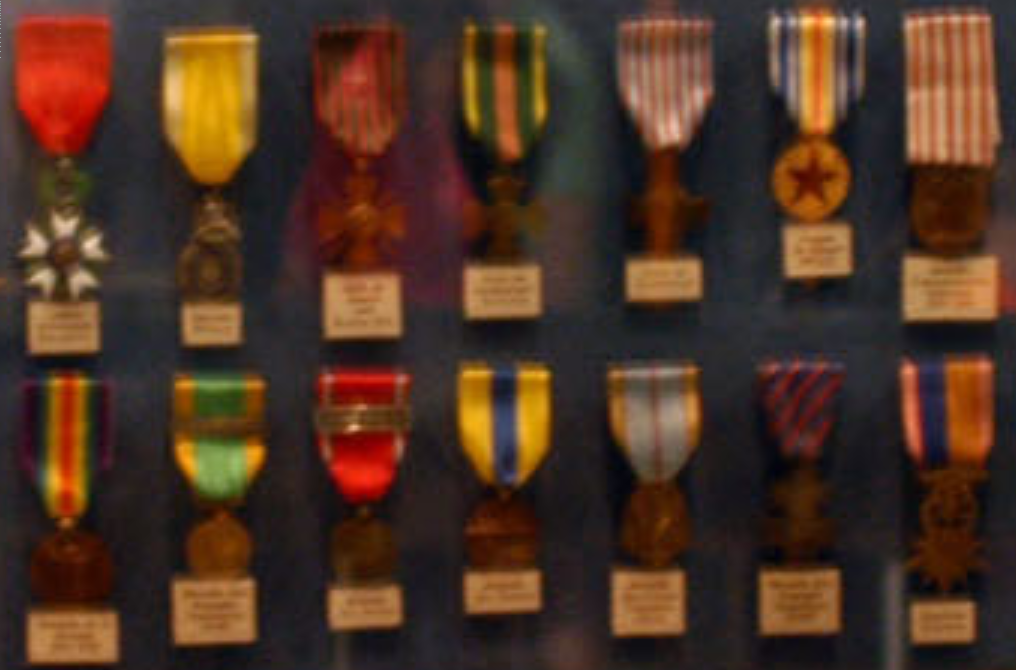
Bullard's decorations

== See also ==
- Moroccan Division
- Escadron de Chasse 2/30 Normandie-Niemen – SPA93.
- Bessie Coleman
- Allan Bundy
