= Croix du combattant volontaire =

The Croix du combattant volontaire (Volunteer combatant cross) may refer to one of three French military decorations rewarding soldiers who spontaneously chose to serve with a fighting unit.

- Croix du combattant volontaire 1914–1918 (Combatant Volunteer Cross 1914–1918) recognizes those who have volunteered to serve on the front in a combat unit during World War I.
- Croix du combattant volontaire de la Résistance (Combatant Volunteer Cross of the Resistance) recognizes those who fought in one of the resistance groups, or have been deported or interned for acts of the Resistance, or have been killed or injured in acts of resistance during World War II.
- Volunteer combatant's cross, originally awarded to those who volunteered to serve in a combat unit during World War II, but continued since
