= 2nd Marching Regiment of the 2nd Foreign Regiment =

2nd Marching Regiment of the 2nd Foreign Regiment 2^{e} régiment de marche du 2^{e} étranger
- Active: 2nd Marching Regiment of the 2nd Foreign Regiment: September 1914 - November 11, 1915
- Country: France
- Branch: French Army
- Type: Infantry
- Role: Marching Regiment
- Engagements: World War I

Insignia
- Abbreviation: 2ème R.M.2^{e} R.E

The 2nd Marching Regiment of the 2nd Foreign Regiment, (French: 2^{e} Régiment de Marche du 2^{e} étranger, 2^{e}R.M. 2^{e}R.E) was a wartime regiment of the French Foreign Legion. It formed the Marching Regiment of the Foreign Legion (R.M.L.E.) and existed briefly from end of 1914 to 1915.

== Creation and different nominations ==
In August 1914 the 2nd Marching Regiment of the 2nd Foreign Regiment (French: 2^{e} Régiment de Marche du 2^{e} étranger, 2^{e}R.M. 2^{e}R.E) was created in Saïda, Algeria.

On November 11, 1915 the 2nd Marching Regiment of the 2nd Foreign Regiment was dissolved and contingents were merged with the 2nd Marching Regiment of the 1st Foreign Regiment (French: 2^{e} Régiment de Marche du 1^{er} étranger,) to form the Régiment de Marche of the Foreign Legion (R.M.L.E.).

== History ==
=== Creation of the regiment ===
On August 29, 1914, the 2nd Marching Regiment of the 2nd Foreign Regiment set voyage from Saïda for Oran and arrived on April 30. The regiment was then formed of 2 battalions at 2 reduced combat companies counting ( 20 Officers - 68 Sous-Officiers - 694 Caporaux and Legionnaires ) On August 30 and 31, the regiment embarked for destination Marseille and disembarked on September 2. While one of the battalion's regiment joined Orléans on September 3, the remainder of the regiment made way to Toulouse and stationed until September 29 at garrison Pérignon.

=== Combats in Champagne ===
The regiment initiated battle formations at camp de Mailly, south of Reims on October 2 when one of the battalion and general headquarter staff rendez-vous with another of the regiment's battalion. On October 18, the day of departure, the regiment counted 1947 men constituting 2 battalions.

The regiment arrived at camp de Pertus on the 19, and with the 2nd Marching Regiment of the 1st Foreign Regiment (French: 2^{e} Régiment de Marche du 1^{er} étranger, 2^{e}R.M.1^{er}R.E), both Marching Regiments formed a brigade which was placed at the corps of the 5th Army of général Louis Félix Marie François Franchet d'Espèrey.

On October 21, the regiment and the brigade were at Verzy, south of Reims. Until October 26, the regiment's battalions relayed each other in the first line trenches within the sectors of Prunay, Sillery, and prepositions of Verzenay in the south-east of Reims.

On October 26, the regiment left Verzenay, destined for Cuiry-les-Chaudardes in the north-west of Reims where the Marching Regiment was assigned to the 71st Brigade of Colonel Denis Auguste Duchêne (5th Army).

The regiment's 3rd recently formed battalion from the depot of Blois, joined the regiment on October 25 at Merval. Starting October 28, the 2nd Marching Regiment of the 2nd Foreign Regiment made way to the first line at the front within the sector of Blanc Sablon and Craonnelle.

On November 26, Chef de bataillon Mauvilain's battalion ( 14 Officers and 1053 men ), left the depot of Orléans and joined the region of Reims at Baslieux-lès-Fismes where the battalion garrisoned for a couple days. Subsequently, on December 15, Mauvilain's battalion to the turn, made way to the first line at the front.

On May 22, 1915, the regiment was relieved from the front by the 34th Infantry Regiment and was retrieved from the 18th Armed Corps; the regiment counted 72 Officers and 3818 men. On the 24th, the regiment prepositionned south of Reims and was assigned to the Provisionary Touborge Division then the Provisionary Corvisart Division.

On June 14, a detachment from the regiment made its way to Prouilly and Chenay in the north-west of Reims and was assigned under the orders of the 1st Armed Corps. The regiment's detachment relieved the 201st French Infantry Regiment in the trenches of Chauffour and Carrières. On June 20, the remainder of the regiment to the turn joined the 1st Armed Corps and relieved the 284th French Infantry Regiment in the sector of Merfy - Saint Thierry. With the 6th Cavalry Chasseurs Regiment, the 2nd Marching Regiment constituted the Guérin group.

On July 11, following the departure of 334 Russians and 394 Belgians, one of the battalion's regiment was subsequently dissolved.

=== Haute Saône ===
On July 14, the regiment was relieved by the 127th French Infantry Regiment, the 75th French Infantry Regiment (territorial) and left the Guérin group. Accordingly, the regiment was assigned to the Moroccan Division (French: Division marocaine) and reconnected again with the 2nd Marching Regiment of the 1st Foreign Regiment (French: 2^{e} Régiment de Marche du 1^{er} étranger, 2^{e}R.M.1^{er}R.E) at the corps of the 1st Brigade, north of Montbéliard.

On August 21, the regiment was put at disposition of the 57th French Infantry Division in order to participate to the mounting of counter-attack preparations in the region of the Sentheim, Soppe le Haut, Leimbash and Roderen south of Thann.

From August 28, the 2nd Marching Regiment was found prepositioning in Plancher Bas, Auxelles Bas and Auxelles Haut.

On September 13, 1915, the regiment participated with the Moroccan Division in an inspection revue in presence of the President of the Republic and the Minister of War, a ceremony during which the regiment received the regimental colors.

=== Return to Champagne ===
On September 14, the regiment left the respective prepositionings and made way to Saint-Hilaire-au-Temple, north of Châlons-en-Champagne within the sector of the 10^{e} DIC.

On September 25, the regiment occupied the front line trenches and participated since the following day to a joint offensive along with the colonial regiments and during which the regimental commander Lecomte-Denis, was wounded. Until October 2, the date in which the regiment was relieved, the regiment registered around the sectors in concern numerous losses.

The 2nd Marching Regiment which reconnected with the 1st Brigade of the Moroccan Division (French: Division marocaine) made way then to Souain-Perthes-lès-Hurlus, then Saint-Étienne-au-Temple, south of Suippes where the regiment garrisoned until October 19 of 1915 and endured also numerous heavy losses.

=== Dissolution ===
On October 20, 1915, the 2nd Marching Regiment of the 2nd Foreign Regiment heads to l'Oise in the region of Pont-Sainte-Maxence, until November 11, the date in which the regiment was dissolved. At dissolution, the regiment counted 30 Officers and 1910 men, all of whom formed the Marching Regiment of the Foreign Legion (RMLE) by merger.

== Traditions ==
=== Regimental Colors ===
The 2nd Marching Regiment of the 2nd Foreign Regiment received the regimental colors on September 13, 1915, in a ceremony presided by President of the Republic and the Minister of War.

=== Decorations ===
Citation of the regiment: " In September 1915, the regiment mounted the assaults of enemy positions with a superb tempo and handling, while seizing numerous machine gun posts ".

== Regimental Commanders ==
Period 1914-1915
2nd Marching Regiment of the 2nd Foreign Regiment
2ème R.M.2^{e}R.E

- August 29, 1914 - December 2, 1914: Lieutenant-Colonel Passard
- December 3, 1914 - December 10, 1914: Chef de bataillon Gueilhers ( by interim )
- December 11, 1914 - September 25, 1915: Colonel Lecomte-Denis
- September 26, 1915 - October 18, 1915: Commandant Rozet ( by interim )
- October 19, 1915 - November 11, 1915: Lieutenant-Colonel de Lavenne de Choulot

== See also ==
- Joseph Joffre
- Canadian National Vimy Memorial
