= Marching Regiment of the Foreign Legion =

Marching Regiment of the Foreign Legion Régiment de Marche de la Légion Étrangère
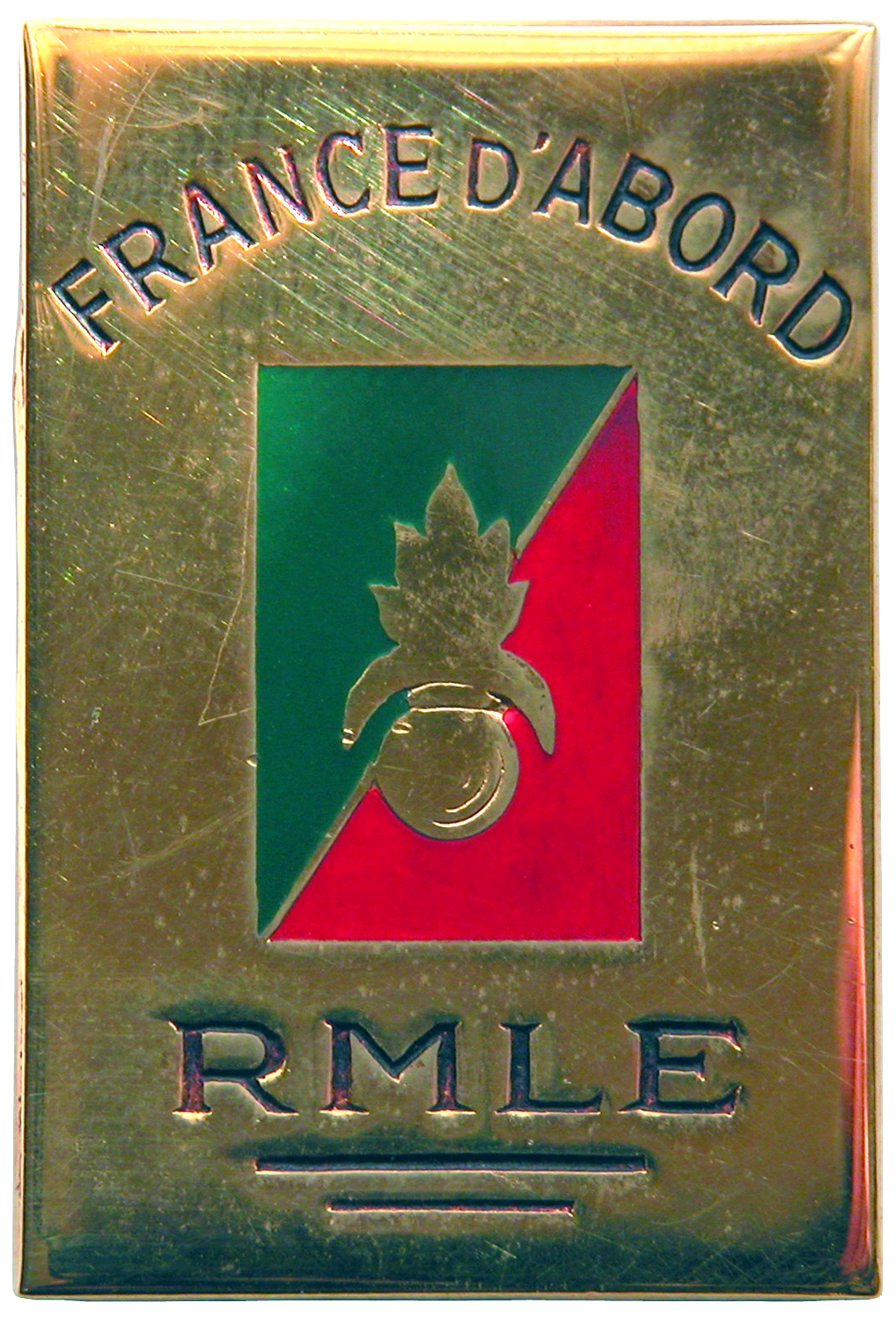
- Insignia of the RMLE
- Active: Marching Regiment of the Foreign Legion: November 11, 1915 – September 20, 1920; December 15, 1942 – July 1945; 3rd Foreign Infantry Regiment: July 1, 1945 – present
- Country: France
- Branch: French Army
- Type: Marching Regiment
- Size: 2700 men
- Motto(s): France d'abord ("France first")
- Colors: green, red
- Anniversaries: Camerone (April 30)
- Engagements: World War I; World War II

Commanders
- Notable commanders: Paul-Frédéric Rollet

Insignia
- Abbreviation: RMLE

The Marching Regiment of the Foreign Legion (RMLE) (French: Régiment de marche de la Légion étrangère) was a French military unit that fought in World War I and World War II. Initially composed of marching regiments from the 1st Foreign Regiment (1^{er} RE) of Sidi Bel Abbes and the 2nd Foreign Infantry Regiment (2^{e} RE) of Saida, Algeria, it re-formed as the 3rd Foreign Infantry Regiment (3^{e} REI).

The Marching Regiment of the Foreign Legion was created on November 11, 1915 by merging:

- the 2nd Marching Regiment of the 1st Foreign Regiment, and
- the 2nd Marching Regiment of the 2nd Foreign Regiment

...with a strength of 71 officers and 3,315 junior officiers, corporals and legionnaires.

The Marching Regiment became the first regiment of the French Army to wear the fourragere with colors of the Médaille militaire and one of the most decorated, along with the Régiment d'infanterie-chars de marine (RICM).

== Creation and name ==
- On November 11, 1915: the Marching Regiment of the Foreign Legion (RMLE) was created by merging the remaining men of the 2nd Marching Regiment of the 1st Foreign Regiment (2^{e} RM 1^{er} RE) with the 2nd Marching Regiment of the 2nd Foreign Regiment, (2^{e} RM 2^{e} RE).
- On November 15, 1920: the RMLE was designated the 3rd Foreign Regiment (3^{e} RE).
- On June 20, 1922: the 3^{e} RE was designated the 3rd Foreign Infantry Regiment (3^{e} REI)
- On December 5, 1942: a Colonial Infantry and Foreign Legion Demi-Brigade, (DBICLE) was created from the components of the 3rd Foreign Infantry Regiment. Ten days later, on December 15, this demi-brigade was designated the 3rd Foreign Marching Infantry Regiment, (3^{e} REIM).
- On July 1, 1943: the 3^{e} REIM was redesignated the RMLE.
- On July 1, 1945: the regiment was redesignated the 3rd Foreign Infantry Regiment, (3^{e} REI).

== History, garrisons, campaigns and battles ==
=== World War I ===
Throughout the course of World War I, the merger of the RMLE of 1915, the predecessor of the 4 Marching Regiments (1914–1915) which existed ephemerally, was in combat at the corps of the Moroccan Division supported by:

- 4th Tunisian Tirailleurs Regiment (4^{e} Régiment de Tirailleurs Tunisiens, 4^{e} RTT)
- 7th Algerian Tirailleurs Regiment (7^{e} Régiment de Tirailleurs Algériens, 4^{e} RTA)
- 8th Zouaves Regiment (8^{e} Régiment de Zouaves, 8^{e} RZ).

==== 1914 ====
August 1914-Formation

The marching regiment of the Foreign Legion (RMLE) of 1915 was constituted from at least 4 Marching Regiments formations created at the beginning of the war. With the addition of volunteers, the 1st Foreign Regiment (1^{er} RE) of Sidi Bel Abbès and the 2nd Foreign Regiment, (2^{e} RE), of Saïda, Algeria, provided demi-battalions as follows:

===== Marching Regiments of the 1st Foreign Regiment =====
The marching regiments of the 1st Foreign Regiment (1^{er} RE) included:

- 1st Marching Regiment of the 1st Foreign Regiment
  - (1^{er} Régiment de Marche du 1^{er} Régiment Etranger, 1^{er} RM 1^{er} RE); 1913 – 1918.
- 2nd Marching Regiment of the 1st Foreign Regiment, (2^{e} Régiment de Marche du 1^{er} Régiment Etranger, 2^{e} RM 1^{er}RE); 1914 – 1915.
- 3rd Marching Regiment of the 1st Foreign Regiment, (3^{e} Régiment de Marche du 1^{er} Régiment Etranger, 3^{e} RM 1^{er} RE); 1914 – 1915.
- 4th Marching Regiment of the 1st Foreign Regiment, (4^{e} Régiment de Marche du 1^{er} Régiment Etranger, 4^{e} RM 1^{er} RE); 1914 – 1915, otherwise known as the Garibaldi Legion (Légion Garibaldienne).

===== Marching Regiments of the 2nd Foreign Regiment =====
The marching regiments that formed the 2nd Foreign Regiment, 2^{e}RE RM included:

- 1st Marching Regiment of the 2nd Foreign Regiment, (1^{er} Régiment de Marche du 2^{e} Régiment Etranger, 1^{er} RM 2^{e} RE); 1907 – 1918).
- 2nd Marching Regiment of the 2nd Foreign Regiment, (2^{e} Régiment de Marche du 2^{e} Régiment Etranger, 2^{e} RM 2^{e} RE); 1914 – 1915).

Volunteers of 51 nationalities arrived from all over France, from recruiting depots in (Toulouse, Montélimar, Paris, Nîmes, Lyon, Avignon, Bayonne and Orléans). Almost 32,000 foreigners were regrouped in an early initial formation of the marching regiments of the Foreign Legion between August 1914 and April 1915. The most numerous nationality present were Italians, who made up an entire regiment (the 4th Marching Regiment of the 1st Foreign Regiment in addition to forming major contingents within the other formed Marching Regiments. Other nationalities represented in significant numbers included Russian, Italian, Greek, Swiss, Belgian, Polish, Czech, Spanish, German, Turkish, Luxembourgers, American and British).

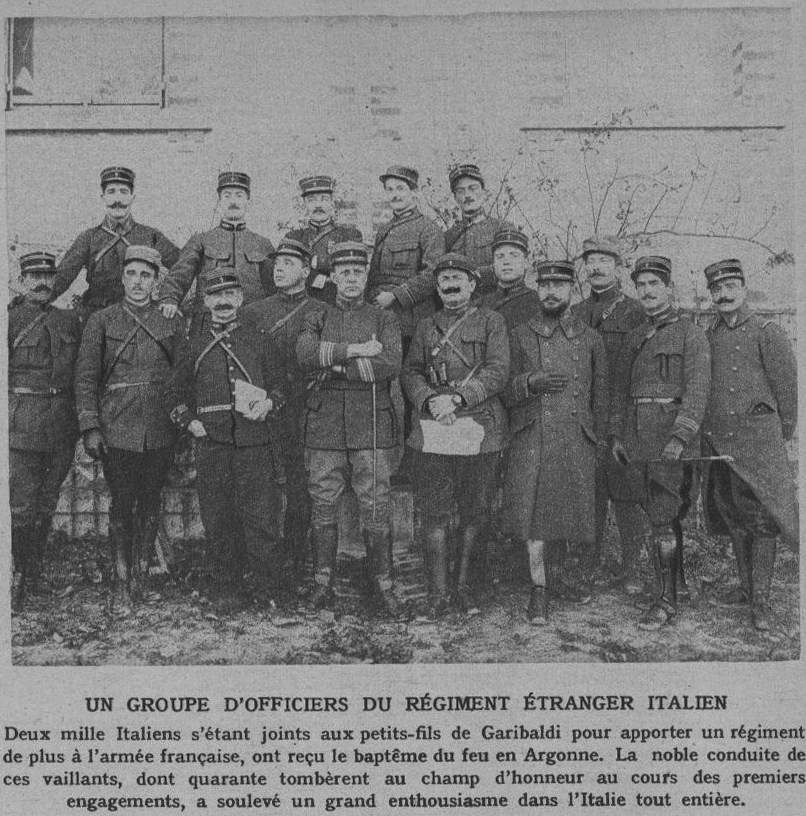
A group of Italian officers of the 2,000 Italians who dominated the 4th Marching Regiment of the 1st Foreign Regiment. At the center is their regimental Lieutenant-Colonel Peppino Garibaldi, January 1915.

==== 1915 ====
The four marching regiments of 1915 were at the front from the end of 1914 to the end of 1915, distinguishing themselves at the

- Forest of Argonne (December 1914)
- Somme and Craonne (winter 1914–1915)
- Artois (May 1915)
- Champagne (September 1915).

An entire additional foreign regiment for the French Army was provided by the All-Italian, the very leading first, 4th Marching Regiment of the 1st Foreign Regiment (French: 4^{e} régiment de marche du 1^{er} étranger, 4^{e}R.M.1^{er}R.E) under regimental commander Lieutenant-Colonel Peppino Garibaldi. This unit had its baptism by fire at Argonne where the first 40 Italian legionnaires were killed in action.

On November 11, 1915 a decision was made by the Chief of the Defence Staff (France) Joseph Joffre, to merge the remaining men of the 2nd Marching Regiment of the 1st Foreign Regiment with the 2nd Marching Regiment of the 2nd Foreign Regiment to form the Marching Regiment of the Foreign Legion (RMLE).

==== 1916 ====
July 1916 - The RMLE was formed of three battalions each with four combat companies which engaged in the Battle of the Somme.

- Regimental Commander Lieutenant-Colonel Cot
  - 1st battalion: Commandant (Major) Ruelland (killed in action July 9)
  - 2nd battalion: Commandant Waddell
  - 3rd battalion: Commandant Mouchet (killed in action July 6)

On July 4 during the siege of Belloy-en-Santerre, the 3rd Battalion was completely destroyed and lost their commandant. In this battle American poet Alan Seeger was also killed. He had volunteered for the Foreign Legion throughout the duration of the World War I and was the author of the poem "I Have A Rendez-vous with Death". On July 7, the 1st battalion launched the attack on Boyau de Chancelier and lost the battalion commandant. Mid-July, the regiment only counted three combat companies per battalion and was pulled back from the front to reconstitute battle formations. From July 4 to the 9, the regiment lost 1368 of 3000 men (14 officers killed and 22 wounded, 431 legionnaires killed or missing and 901 wounded).

==== 1917 ====
April 1917 – Aubérive

- Regimental Commander Lieutenant-Colonel Duriez (killed April 17)
  - 1st battalion: Commandant Famille Husson de Sampigny
  - 2nd battalion: Commandant James Waddell
  - 3rd battalion: Commandant Deville then Captain Lannurien

The battle lasted from the April 17 to 21 and put out of commission half of the 1500 legionnaires of the RMLE and they lost their regimental commander, who was replaced by Commandant Deville.

August 1917 – Battle of Verdun

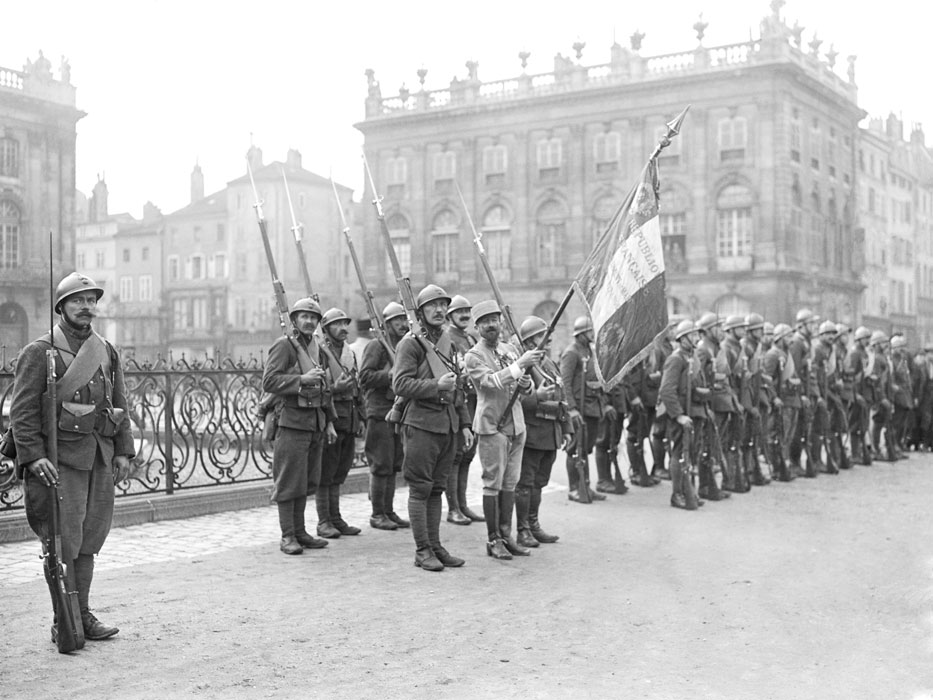
Review of the Marching Regiment of the Foreign Legion at the end of November 1918.

- Regimental Commander Lieutenant-Colonel Paul-Frédéric Rollet
  - 1st battalion: Commandant Husson de Sampigny
  - 2nd battalion: Commandant Waddell
  - 3rd battalion: Commandant Deville

On August 20, the regiment was in charge of counterattacking to save the city. Entrenched in front of the regiment were four enemy regiments. On the 21st, the regiment attained all set objectives and pierced the front, spearheading up to 3.5 km into the line. With that, the regiment earned a 6th citation at the orders of the armed forces and was decorated the regimental colors with the Légion d'honneur.

==== 1918 ====
April 1918 – Le bois de Hangard

The 131st Infantry Division marched against the village of Hangard and cote 99. While not a surprise, an urgent response was present to contain at best. The Moroccan Division launched into battle with no prior preparation. The RMLEo covered the right wing of the Moroccan Division. The objective of the regiment was Le bois de Hangard. The German response was immediate; exchange of fire was continuous. The survivors of the 1st battalion lead their progression charging, followed by the 11th combat company of the 3rd battalion. Legion officers were lost first leading assaults and the legionnaires would find themselves often deprived of their lead. Legionnaire Kemmler, a Luxembourgian volunteer, a medic in the Machine gun section, took charge of the lead. Even though wounded, Kemmler took command of injured legionnaires and despite the environment, managed to dress and maintain the atmosphere around the men. Accordingly, the legionnaires found their lead and made front valiantly until the arrival of an adjudant. Consequently, the assault of the regiment was saved. The nights and days that succeeded until 6 May, revolved around maintaining positions and repelling a series of incessant counter-attacks. The siege of "Le bois de Hangard" on April 26 witnessed the destruction of the 1st and 2nd battalions; losses for the regiment included 822 men out of which thirteen officers.

May–June 1918 – La Montagne de Paris

On 29 May, the Moroccan Division and the RMLE had to block an advancement towards Villers-Cotterêts while taking position on the "Montagne de Paris". The attack was launched at dawn following a storming incessant rainy series of artillery round batteries. Superior in number forces, opposing forces succeeded in reaching the vicinity of legion positions. Forced to economize their ammunitions, Legionnaires endured 47 killed, 219 wounded and 70 missing in two days of combat. Losses for the legion increased to those of the previous month, almost 1250 men. Nevertheless, the RMLE succeeded in maintaining its positions and blocked the German advance in the Legion's designated combat area sectors.

Until 31 May, on a 5 km stretch, the RMLE, which included Armenian volunteers, along with the 3e BCP and 10e BCP, held the line during six days and six nights, without rear forces support, heavy artillery, air support, and with only one available short artillery battery; the regiment managed to halt all successive attacks.

July 1918 – Second Battle of the Marne

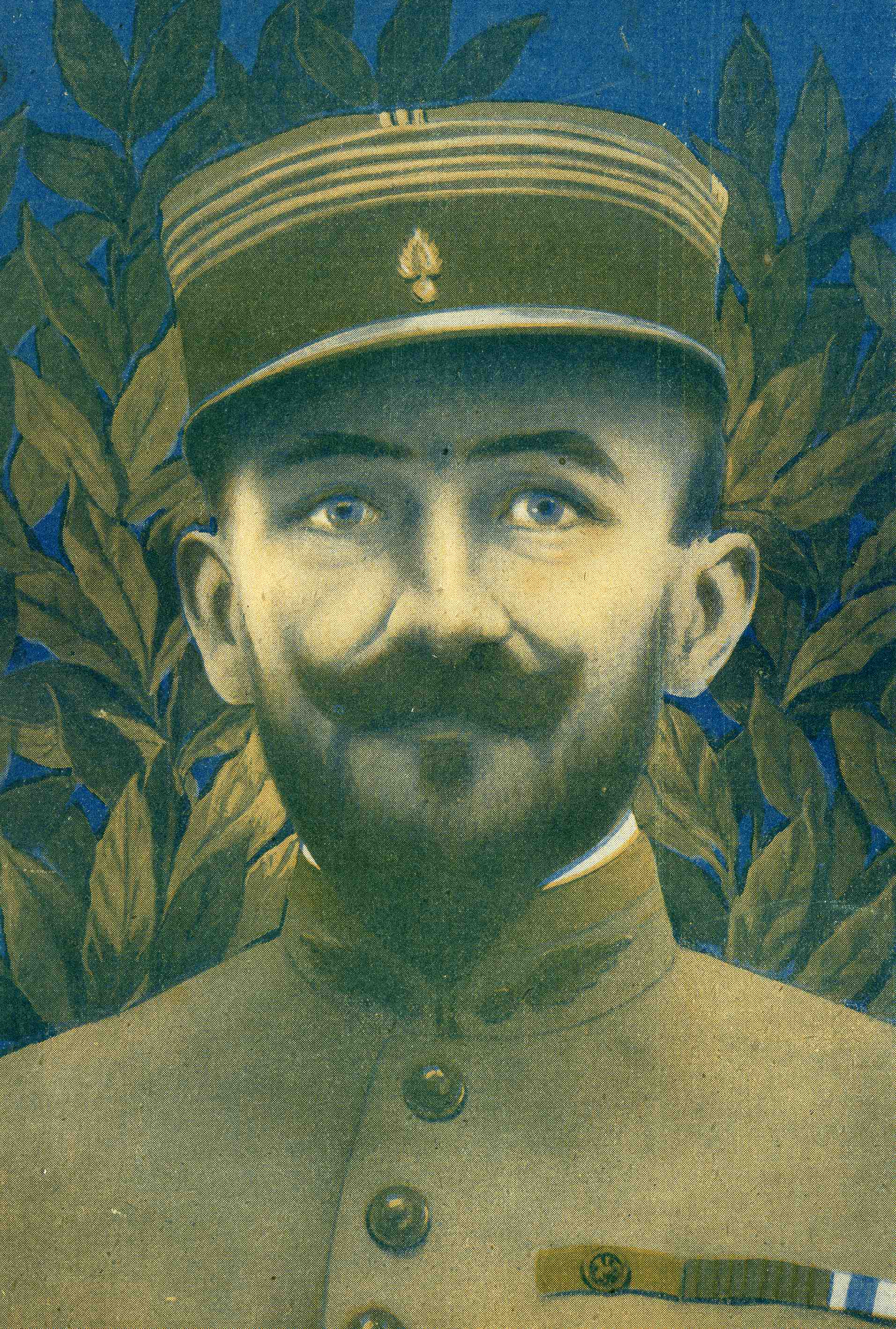
Colonel Paul-Frédéric Rollet in 1919.

The RMLE participated after July 18 in the grand counter-offensive of Marshal of France Ferdinand Foch, in the region of Villers-Cotterêts. The 1st Battalion lost their commander, commandant Husson de Sampigny.

September 1918 – Hindenburg Line

In August 1918, the regiment recuperated the wounded and filled the ranks with reinforcements from the depot in Lyon and cadres from Morocco counting 48 officers and 2,540 legionnaires):

- Regimental Commander Lieutenant-Colonel Paul-Frédéric Rollet
  - 1st battalion: Captain Jacquesson
  - 2nd battalion: Captain Lannurien then Captain Sanchez-Carrero
  - 3rd battalion: Commandant (Major) Marseille

On September 2, the regiment launched an assault on the defense line of Hindenburg at the elevation of Terny-Sorny. In two weeks of combat, the Marching Regiment of the Foreign Legion lost half the men in the regiment (275 killed out of which 10 officers and 1118 wounded of whom 15 were officers).

Consequently, the regiment endured the loss of its chef de bataillon Captain Lannurien. Nevertheless, on September 14 the RMLE pushed forward and relaunched the attacks while piercing the front at the village of Allemant.

=== Interwar period (1918–1939) ===
The regiment was, stationed for a short duration in Germany and was then dispatched to take part in campaigns of Morocco. On September 20, 1920, the RMLE was designated the 3rd Foreign Regiment.

=== World War II (1939–1945) ===
December 1942 – 3^{e} REIM

Following the disembarkation of United States Army units in Morocco (Operation Torch of November 8, 1942), the French Foreign Legion was ordered to form units to combat the Germans in Tunisia. Following the brief existence of a Colonial Infantry and Foreign Legion Marching Demi-Brigade (5/12/1942), Général Henri Giraud on December 15, 1942 created the 3rd Foreign Marching Infantry Regiment 3^{e} REIM, from elements of the I (battalion) / 3^{e} REI, the III (battalion) / 3^{e} REI, and a third mixed battalion from the 3rd Foreign Infantry Regiment, 3^{e} REI and 2nd Foreign Infantry Regiment, 2^{e} REI. Each battalion had four combat companies.

- Regimental Commander Colonel Lambert
  - I / 3^{e} REIM: Commandant Laparra
  - II / 3^{e} REIM: Commandant Boissier
  - III / 3^{e}REIM: Commandant Langlet

In January 1943, the 3^{e} REIM was totally engaged in resisting the German offensive, engaged in separating the communication couloir between the Armies of Generaloberst Hans-Jürgen von Arnim of Tunisia, and the Armies of Generalfeldmarschall Erwin Rommel, set back since the Second Battle of El Alamein.

On the 18th, during the combats of the reservoir of l'Oued Kebir, the II (battalion) / 3^{e} REIM was completely destroyed and the battalion's Commandant was wounded and taken captive. The next day, to the turn, the I (battalion) / 3^{e} REIM disappeared. During combats, the regiment had the sad privilege of meeting the first German Tiger I tanks and the regiment endured the loss of 35 officers and 1634 legionnaires.

Consequently, the regiment had only two battalions capable left, each with two combat companies. Retrieved from the front on February 10 to reform battle formations, the regiment was reinforced on March 30, 1943 by a detachment from Morocco.

- Regimental Commander, Colonel Lambert
  - I / 3^{e} REIM: Commandant Laparra
  - II / 3^{e} REIM : Commandant Gombeaud

On April 16, the regiment was assigned to the Moroccan Marching Division commanded by General Mathemet.

Re-formation of the R.M.L.E

On July 1, 1943, the 3^{e} REI M was subsequently entirely US American built equipped and was redesignated as the R.M.L.E. The regiment was integrated in the 5th Armored Division.

- Regimental Commander, Colonel Gentis
  - I / R.M.L.E: Commandant (Major) Daigny (assigned to CC5)
  - II / RMLE: Commandant Charton (assigned to CC4)
  - III / RMLE: A Commandant (assigned to CC6)

Belfort – November 1944

On September 14 and 20, 1944, the three battalions disembarked near Saint-Raphaël on the beach of Dramont. From November 15 to December 13, the battalions of the RMLE participated with the designated Combat Command of the 5th Armored Division in operations of Trouée de Belfort. The 3rd combat company of the I / RMLE was decimated at Montreux-Château while elements of the 7th combat company (I Battalion / RMLE) illustrated savoir-faire near Delle and halted a German combat company.

Colmar Pocket – January 1945

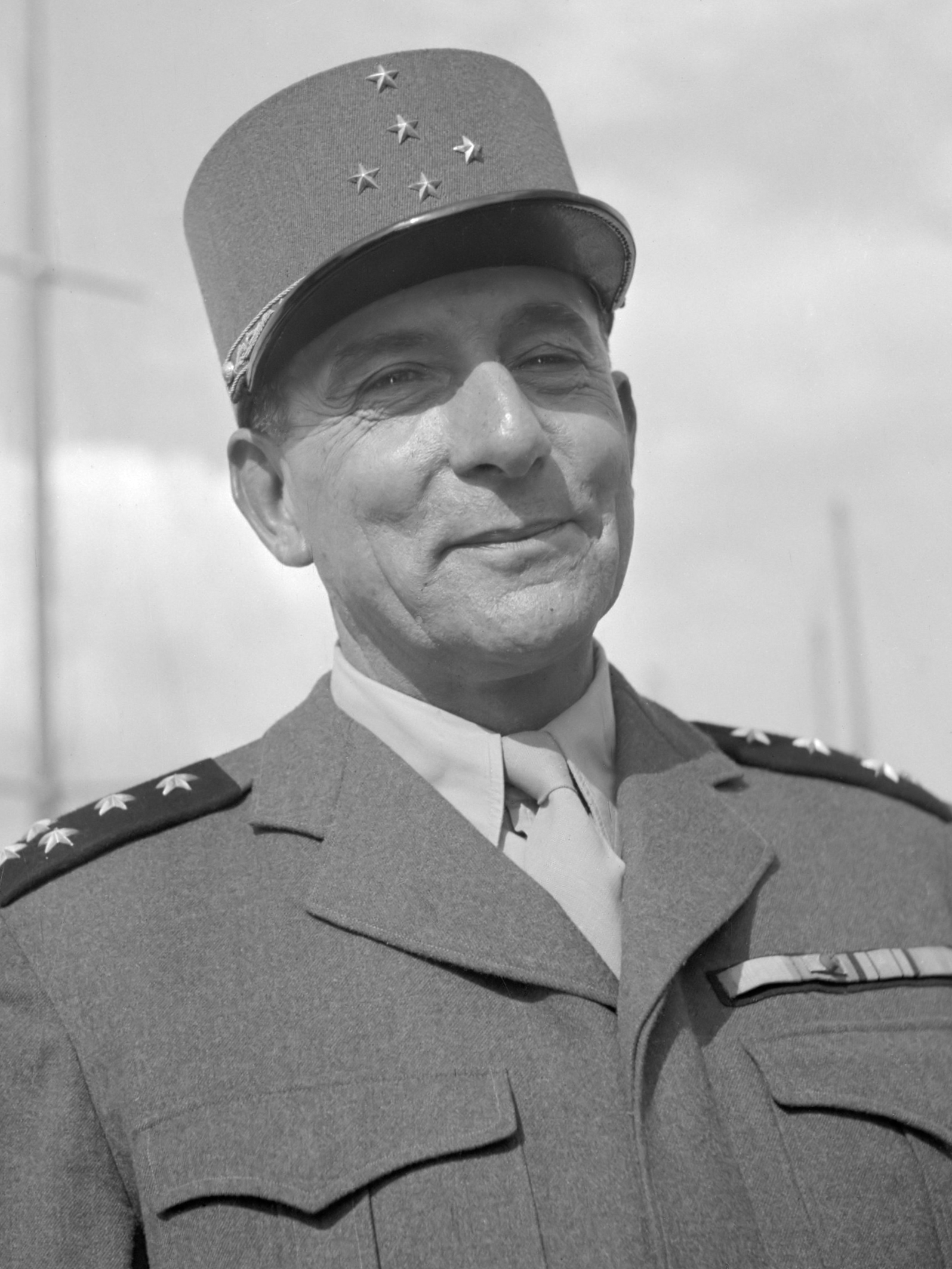
General Jean de Lattre de Tassigny in 1946.

- Regimental Commander Colonel Louis-Antoine Gaultier (by interim of Colonel Tristschler)
  - I / RMLE: Commandant Daigny (assigned to CC5)
  - II / RMLE: Commandant de Chambost (assigned to CC4)
  - III / RMLE: Commandant Boulanger (assigned to CC6)

The regiment was engaged again with the 5th Armored Division starting January 22, 1945 in the counter-offensive put into motion by Marshal of France (posthumous) Jean de Lattre de Tassigny to relieve Strasbourg. The CC6 including the III (battalion) / RMLE fought alongside the 1st Parachute Chasseur Regiment (1^{er} RCP); of the French Air Force transferred to the French Army; at Jebsheim northeast of Colmar from January 25 to 30. The CC5 took Urschenheim on February 1, 1945 while the CC4 liberated Colmar on the 2nd.

Germany – Austria – March to May 1945

On March 11, 1945, Colonel Jean Olié replaced Colonel Tritschler, who had died at the Val-de-Grâce military hospital.

On March 15, the CC6 (III (battalion)/ RMLE) was engaged by the 3rd Algerian Infantry Division for the conquest of the Annemarie Line then in the piercing of the Siegfried Line on the 20th. On April 9, the regiment penetrated the Black Forest and captured Stuttgart on the 21st. Continued south, the regiment cleared and made its way to the Danube and then Lake Constance. Subsequently, the regiment penetrated Austria in May 1945 on the eve of the 8th.

== Traditions ==
=== Regimental Colors ===
At creation, on November 11, 1915, the R.M.L.E had for regimental colors, the Flag of:

2nd Marching Regiment of the 1st Foreign Regiment

- On the avers (front, inscribed in French)
  - French Republic
  - Marching Regiment of the Foreign Legion
- On the revers (back, inscribed in French)
  - Honneur and Patrie
    (on the regimental colors of the 3rd Foreign Infantry Regiment 3^{e} R.E.I, this motto was replaced in 1920 with Honneur et Fidélité, the year before the founding of the 1st Foreign Cavalry Regiment).

During World War II, the new R.M.L.E received the regimental colors of the 3rd Foreign Regiment, (3e RE).

=== Decorations ===
The regimental colors of the RMLE are decorated with:

- Knight Cross of the Légion d'honneur (September 27, 1917)
- Médaille militaire (August 30, 1919)
- Croix de Guerre 1914–1918 (September 13, 1915) with:
  - 9 palms, allowing the double Fourragère in the colours of the Légion d'honneur and Croix de guerre.
- Croix de Guerre 1939–1945 with:
  - 3 palms, allowing the 1939–1945 olive on the fourragère.
- Ordem Militar da Torre e Espada (Order of the Tower and Sword – Portugal)
- Medalla dels voluntaris catalans (Catalonia)
- Presidential Unit Citation with RHINE-BAVARIAN ALPS conferred May 6, 1946 by the United States.

The RMLE was the first regiment in France to receive the right to display the fourragère with the colors of the Médaille militaire.

=== Honours ===
==== Battle honours ====
- Camerone 1863
- Artois 1915
- Champagne 1915
- Bataille de la Somme 1916
- Les Monts-Verdun 1917
- Picardie-Soissonnais 1918
- Vauxaillon 1918

== Commanders ==
1914–1915
Marching regiments prior to the RMLE 2nd Marching Regiment of the 1st Foreign Regiment

- 1914–1915: Colonel Pein
- 1915-1915: Lieutenant-colonel Cot

3rd Marching Regiment of the 1st Foreign Regiment

- 1914-1914: Colonel Thiebault
- 1914–1915: Lieutenant-colonel Desgouille

4th Marching Regiment of the 1st Foreign Regiment
(Garibaldi Legion)

- 1914–1915: Lieutenant-colonel Peppino Garibaldi

2nd Marching Regiment of the 2nd Foreign Regiment

- 1914-1914: Colonel Passard
- 1914–1915: Colonel Lecomte-Denis
- 1915-1915: Colonel de Lavenue de Choulot

1915–1920: Marching Regiment of the Foreign Legion
RMLE

- 1915–1917: Lieutenant-colonel Cot
- 1917-1917: Colonel Duriez
- 1917–1920: Lieutenant-colonel Paul-Frédéric Rollet

1920–1943: 3rd Foreign Infantry Regiment
1943–1945: Marching Regiment of the Foreign Legion

- 1943-1943: Colonel Gentis
- 1943–1944: Colonel Tritschler
- 1944–1945: Lieutenant-colonel Louis-Antoine Gaultier
- 1945-1945: Colonel Jean Olié

1945–present: 3rd Foreign Infantry Regiment

== Honorary Regimental Arms Celebration ==
The R.M.L.E, was decorated for piercing the Hindenburg Line on September 14, 1918. Since then this battle has been celebrated by the 3rd Foreign Infantry Regiment, (3^{e} R.E.I), since this regiment inherited the traditions of the RMLE.

== Notable members ==
- Colonel Alphonse Van Hecke, Sous-Lieutenant in the RMLE in 1917, who commanded the 7th African Chasseur Regiment (7e régiment de chasseurs d'Afrique, 7e RCA) during World War II
- American poet Alan Seeger
- Swiss French-naturalized poet Blaise Cendrars
- Lieutenant-Colonel Prince Count Aage of Rosenborg
- Colonel Paul-Frédéric Rollet
- Italian writer Curzio Malaparte
- Italian-bornv French naturalized Lazare Ponticelli
