= 2nd Marching Regiment of the 1st Foreign Regiment =

2nd Marching Regiment of the 1st Foreign Regiment 2^{e} Régiment de marche du 1^{er} étranger
- Active: 2nd Marching Regiment of the 1st Foreign Regiment: September 1914 - November 11, 1915
- Country: France
- Branch: French Army
- Type: Infantry
- Role: Marching Regiment
- Engagements: World War I

Commanders
- Notable commanders: Colonel Pein; Colonel Cot

Insignia
- Abbreviation: 2ème R.M.1^{er} R.E

The 2nd Marching Regiment of the 1st Foreign Regiment, (French: 2^{e} régiment de marche du 1^{er} étranger, 2^{e} R.M. 1^{er} R.E) was a French military unit of the Legion which formed the Marching Regiment of the Foreign Legion (R.M.L.E) and existed ephemerally from end of 1914 to 1915.

== Creation and different nominations ==
In September 1914: the 2nd Marching Regiment of the 1st Foreign Regiment, (French: 2^{e} régiment de marche du 1^{er} régiment étranger, 2^{e} R.M.1^{er} R.E) was created from effectifs of the 1st Foreign Regiment.

On November 11, 1915: the 2nd Marching Regiment of the 1st Foreign Regiment, (French: 2^{e}R.M. 1^{er} R.E) was dissolved and contingents were merged with the 2nd Marching Regiment of the 2nd Foreign Regiment, (French: 2^{e} régiment de marche du 2^{e} régiment étranger, 2^{e}R.M.2^{e}R.E) in order to form the Marching Regiment of the Foreign Legion (R.M.L.E).

== History during First World War ==
=== Creation of the regiment ===
On August 14, 1914, the minister decided that foreigners could contract military service for the duration of the war. Accordingly, the 1st Foreign Regiment at Sidi Bel Abbès received ministerial orders to form two units in order to provide a cadre administering to the recruiting depots of Lyon, Avignon and Bayonne where volunteers were being received. The forecast effectif for each recruiting depots was one Officer, four Sous-Officiers and 22 Legionnaires, and must be exclusively French or naturalized.

=== 1914 ===
The two demi-battalions which formed two combat companies left Sidi Bel-Abbès on August 28, 1914, and arrived on September 7 in metropolitan France. The 1st demi-battalion, Chef de bataillon Dourin, the 17ème and 18ème combat companies, was destined for the depot of Lyon. The 2nd demi-battalion, Captain Collet, the 19ème and 20ème combat companies, was destined for Avignon.

At their arrival, the two demi-battalions constituted each, one battalion of 250 men with including the forming volunteer effectifs in the recruiting depots.

On September 12, Colonel Pein assumed command of the 2nd Marching Regiment of the 1st Foreign Regiment (2^{e}R.M.1^{er}R.E); the regiment counted two battalions, each mounted with 4 combat companies.

==== First combats in the Marne ====
On September 25, the regiment made way to Mailly-le-Camp and was placed under the authority of the 20ème region of général de Torcy.

On October 18, 1914, the two Marching Regiments of the 1st Foreign and 2nd Foreign were put at the disposition of the 5th Army and formed a reserve integrated army brigade within the Moroccan Division.

On October 21, the regiment was placed in the Marne at Verzy and occupied trenches between Prunay and Sillery.

Arrived on October 26 at the camp de Mailly, Commandant Noiré's battalion was constituted from the depot in Bayonne, and was readied in line at the beginning of November 1914 at Prunay.

Similarly, on November 22, chef de bataillon Muller's battalion coming from the depot in Avignon, readied at Louvois where the battalion completed formation in December. Two combat companies of the battalion made way to the front on December 13 in the sector of the Marquises.

Starting from October 1914, the battalions relayed each other and were either in line within trenches sector of Prunay and the city of des Marquises or being prepositioned in the villages of Verzenay, Mailly and along the Canal de l'Aisne à la Marne. The regiment was permanently exposed to artillery fire barrages and subjected to close quarters combat.

=== 1915 ===
The 2nd Marching Regiment of the 1st Foreign Regiment was extracted from allocated positionings between April 22 and 24 of 1915. The regiment garrisoned from April 24 to 25 in Villers-Allerand, Louvois, Montchenot and Sermiers until being transported by train to Aubigny-en-Artois. On the 27th, the regiment was at Villers-Brûlin and at Béthonsart.

Already since the 28th, the regiment was posted at the front and relieved elements of the 77th French Infantry Division (French: 77^{e} Division d'infanterie, 77^{e} D.I). Front line commands of the division were accordingly stationed.

==== Combats in Artois, region of Neuville-Saint-Vaast - Givenchy ====
On May 9, 1915, at 10:00, following a small preparation of artillery, the regiment's battalions launched the assaults successively. The combat engagement for the regiment counted 75 officers and 3,822 men.

In 90 minutes of combat, the regiment managed to gain all set objectives (Ouvrages Blancs - ouvrage de Nuremberg) and attained finally the route de Béthune then cote 140. Due to a lack of reinforcement, the regiment was only capable of holding for two hours on the last objective and was forced to unfold on cote 123 which was held till the following morning.

The losses for the regiment during the confrontation were considerable: 1889 men, near half of effectifs were placed out of combat ( killed or disappeared: 20 Officers and 933 men - wounded: 28 Officers and 956 men ). The tribute of Officers was eloquent: the regimental commander, colonel Cot was wounded, while the regiment's three battalion commanders were killed ( Commandant Noiré, Commandant Muller and Commandant Gaubert ). Also, the loss of the previous regimental commander, Colonel Pein, was recently deplored while leading the 1st Brigade of the Moroccan Division

On May 30, the regiment was partially reconstituted and recounted 4 new battalions due to the arrival reinforcements.

On June 4 and 5, 325 Italians left the regiment to rejoin their Armed Forces in their country which recently entered the war.

On the 16, the 2nd Marching Regimentof the 1st Foreign Regiment was formed of 3 battalions and counted 67 Officers and 2,509 men. The regiment accordingly illustrated capability in the combats of Souchez - Givenchy-en-Gohelle. Losses for regiment were considerable as well with 625 men placed out of combat ( killed or disappeared: 2 Officers and 305 men - wounded: 18 Officers and 300 men ). Commandant Collet, the only survivor of May 9, was part of the injured.

The regiment was relieved between the 17 and 19 of June and prepositioned near Chelers.

On June 21, some of the Alsatians and Lorrainians headed back to the depots.

On June 22, following a launched assault, the Greek battalion was sent back to the rear to further enhance training implementations. Accordingly, the regiment only had two battalions counting 950 men.

On June 24 and 25, the regiment was found again in the first line trenches of the Givenchy sector. Relieved since the 26, the regiment prepositioned in the region of Hesdin until July 6.

On July 1, 1915, the 2nd Marching Regiment of the 1st Foreign Regiment constituted 39 Officers and 1113 men; and while 150 Russians were in instance phases of completing or integrating; the regiment was still limited to two functioning battalions.

==== Montbéliard ====
Since July 8, the regiment stationed in the region of de Montbéliard with the Moroccan Division (Montbéliard, Sochaux et Exincourt).

On the 14, the regiment changed prepositioning and made way to Buyans, Champey, Coisevaux, Chevret and Couthenans then Verlans.

On the 15, following the dissolution of the 3rd Marching Regiment of the 1st Foreign Regiment (French: 3^{e} Régiment de Marche du 1^{er} Régiment Etranger, 3^{e}R.M.1^{er}R.E); 5 Officers and 892 men were assigned to the regiment which counted 2060 men. On July 18, 42 permissionnaires of the 3rd Marching Regiment completed this reinforcement.

On July 17, the regiment made way to the Plancher-les-Mines and Le Mont.

On August 1, the regiment then counted 2385 men and 54 Officers divided into two battalions, one company hors rang, one machine gun company, and one brigade machine gun company.

On August 26 to 27, the regiment left Plancher-les-Mines and went on relieving the 2nd Marching Regiment of the 2nd Foreign Regiment (French: 2^{e} Régiment de Marche du 2^{e} Régiment Etranger, 2^{e}R.M.2^{e}R.E) at Soppe-le-Haut, Sentheim, Roderen, Morzwiller et Leimbach.

On September 1, the regiment returned to Plancher les Mînes and Le Mont while constituted a sapeurs platoon.

On September 13, 1915, the Regiment as well as the Moroccan Division (French: Division marocaine) participated to a military inspection revue in presence of the President of the Republic and the Minister of War. During this arms ceremony, the regiment received the regimental colors as well as the Croix de Guerre with palm for the most recent citation at the orders of the armed forces.

==== Combats in the Marne ====
On September 15 and 16, the regiment left Plancher les Mînes for another front zone near Châlons-en-Champagne. The two battalions prepositioned at proximity of Suippes. The 1st Brigade ( Colonel Delavan ) was placed under the authority command of the 10th Colonial Infantry Division (10e division d'infanterie coloniale) of général Jean-Baptiste Marchand while still remaining though under the authority responsibility of the Moroccan Division.

25 September- October 6 : Second Battle of Champagne
On September 25, orders were instructed to take part to the mounted offensive with the 10^{e} DIC in the region of Souain. This offensive went underway until the 28 and resulted in a defeat due to the solid German positions, the incessant bombardments, and the weak artillery preparations. The provisional attempts to take the second German lines on September 28 were unforgiving. Out of the 43 Officers and 1960 men engaged at the front; the regiment endured the loss 20 Officers and 608 men ( killed in action, missing and wounded ).

In 4 days of combat, the regiment endured heavy losses while affecting particularly the command corps: both battalion commanders Burel and Declève were killed (or disappeared) and six out eight combat companies lost their Commandants. Total losses for the regiment were 951 men ( Officers : 12 killed or missing, 17 wounded - 922 men killed, missing or wounded ).

The regiment was relieved on October 2 and garrisoned on the 4th in camp de la Noblette where a reorganization took place manoeuvering three combat companies per battalion.

From October 6 to the 17th, the 2nd Marching Regiment of the 1st Foreign Regiment was engaged again in an operation around Souain. Placed in reserve of armed forces corps, the regiment endured the loss of 115 men ( killed, missing or wounded ) out of which 1 Officer.

==== Dissolution in l'Oise ====
Relieved on October 18, the regiment was in pause at Verberie and Saint-Vaast-de-Longmont on the 21.

On November 8, one of the battalion's regiment was dissolved and merged with another within the regiment's battalion configurations.

On November 11, the 2nd Marching Regiment of the 1st Foreign Regiment was officially dissolved. The command of the new regiment was entrusted to Lt.Colonel Cot. 38 Officers and 1233 men were assigned to the new regiment, in principal in the first battalion, the company hors rang, the machine gun company of the regiment, and the 1st machine gun company of the brigade.

== Traditions ==
=== Insignia ===
The 2nd Marching Regiment of the 1st Foreign Regiment did not have an official insignia.

=== Regimental Colors ===
On September 13, 1915, at Chaux, during a military inspection revue in presence President of the Republic Raymond Poincaré, the regiment received the regimental colors decorated with the Croix de Guerre with one palm for a citation on September 8, 1915 (Artois - May 9, 1915).

A second palm was bestowed on the regiment, following dissolution, for a citation on January 28, 1916 (Marne, ferme de Navarin - September to October 1915).

The regimental colors was conserved by the Marching Regiment of the Foreign Legion, R.M.L.E following the dissolution of the regiment.

=== Decorations ===
The regiment was cited twice at the orders of the armed forces which confers two palms on the regiment's croix de guerre:

- Citation awarded on September 8 for merits on May 9, 1915, in Artois
- Citation awarded on January 28, 1916, for merits on September 20 to October 17, 1915, in la Marne.

== Regimental Commanders ==
Period 1914-1915
2nd Marching Regiment of the 1st Foreign Regiment
2ème R.M.1^{e}R.E

- September 12, 1914 - May 8, 1915: Colonel Pein ( †)
- May 8, 1915 - May 9, 1915: Colonel Cot
- May 9, 1915 - June 13, 1915: in interim, Commandant Collet.
- June 13, 1915 - November 11, 1915: Colonel Cot.

Note: Colonel Pein, named regimental commander of the 1st Moroccan Brigade which the 2nd Marching Regiment of the 1st Foreign Regiment is a part of, was killed during combats on May 9, 1915.

== Notable Officers and legionnaires ==
- François Faber, Luxembourgian, racing cyclist victor of the Tour de France in 1909.

== See also ==
- Joseph Joffre
- Canadian National Vimy Memorial
