= Volunteer Combatant's Cross =

Volunteer combatant's cross
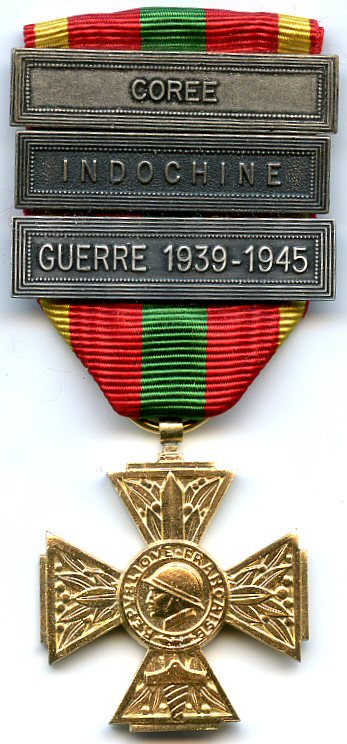
- Volunteer combatant's cross (obverse)
- Type: Medal
- Awarded for: Volunteers for the war 1939–1945
- Presented by: France
- Established: 4 February 1953
- Ribbon of the Volunteer combatant's cross

Precedence
- Next (higher): Volunteer combatant's cross 1914–1918
- Next (lower): Cross of the resistance volunteer combatant

The Volunteer combatant's cross (French: "Croix du combattant volontaire") was a French decoration that originally recognized those who volunteered to serve in a combat unit during World War II. It is the equivalent of the "1914–1918 Volunteer combatant's cross" (French: "Croix du Combattant Volontaire 1914–1918").

== History ==
This decoration is equivalent to that awarded to the soldiers of the First World War. At the request of the associations of veterans the state fixed by Act of 4 February 1953, accompanied by a decree of 19 November 1955, the award Croix du Combattant Volontaire 1939–1945, designated for those who volunteered to serve. In 1983 the original act establishing this award as the "1939-1945 Volunteer combatant's cross" (French: "Croix du combattant volontaire 1939-1945") was abolished and replaced by an act that added clasps to the medal, specifying the specific areas of combat, and renaming it more simply to "Volunteer combatant's cross" . Additional revisions of the act establishing this award in 1995 and 2007 have added a total of five clasps:

- Guerre 1939–1945
- Indochine
- Corée
- Afrique du Nord
- Missions extérieures

== Description of the medal ==
A cross with four arms in bronze, 36 mm wide. Engraved by Frédéric-Charles-Victor de Vernon.

On the obverse: a round central medallion with the legend surrounding REPUBLIQUE FRANCAISE:

- Effigy of a helmeted Poilu (World War I infantryman), on a sword drawn vertically on the arms of the cross which is covered with laurel leaves and oak leaves in relief.

On the reverse: inside the central medallion, a branch of laurel is surrounded by the inscription: COMBATTANT VOLONTAIRE 1939–1945. The reverse of the 1983 version has no date. The cross arms are covered with leaves of laurel and oak forming relief.

== Eligibility ==
The Volunteer combatant's cross was created to honor those who voluntarily participated in an armed conflict, during which they put their lives at risk.

In this spirit, the candidate for this distinction must provide proof from what he has done is a voluntary act of serving in a combat unit, so that because of his age or his circumstances, he was compelled to any "service obligation" (read "no obligation such "). From what he has in fact been present in a unit recognized fighter, during a specified time.

The Volunteer combatant's cross is considered a war decoration during the review of applications for Légion d'honneur, la Médaille militaire and l'Ordre national du Mérite.

== See also ==
- Ribbons of the French military and civil awards
