= 3rd Marching Regiment of the 1st Foreign Regiment =

3rd Marching Regiment of the 1st Foreign Regiment 3^{e} régiment de marche du 1^{er} étranger
- Active: 3rdd Marching Regiment of the 1st Foreign Regiment: September 4, 1914 - July 13, 1915
- Country: France
- Branch: French Army
- Type: Infantry
- Role: Marching Regiment
- Size: 2200
- Nickname(s): Marching Regiment of the Foreign Legion of the entrenched Camp of Paris; Régiment de marche de la Légion étrangère du camp retranché de Paris
- Engagements: World War I

Insignia
- Abbreviation: 3ème R.M.1^{er}R.E

The 3rd Marching Regiment of the 1st Foreign Regiment, (French: 3^{e} régiment de marche du 1^{er} étranger, 3^{e}R.M. 1^{er}R.E) was a unit of the French Foreign Legion which formed the Marching Regiment of the Foreign Legion (R.M.L.E) and existed ephemerally from end of 1914 to 1915.

== Creation and different nominations ==
- On September 4, 1914: the Marching Regiment of the Foreign Legion of the entrenched camp of Paris (French: Régiment de marche de la Légion étrangère du camp retranché de Paris) was created.
- On November 28: the regiment adopted the designation of the 3rd Marching Regiment of the 1st Foreign Regiment (French: 3^{e} Régiment de Marche du 1^{er} Régiment Etranger, 3^{e}R.M.1^{er}R.E).
- On July 13, 1915 : dissolution of the regiment

== History, garrisons, campaigns and battles ==
- As of August 24, 1914, foreign volunteers were received at the camp of Reuilly and were taken in charge by the 32nd (Territorial Regiment). For training encadrement, senior officers were called in for the occasion as well as sapeurs pompiers.
- On September 4, the regiment was formed and was designated as the Marching Regiment of the Foreign Legion of the entrenched camp of Paris, accordingly, counting one general headquarter staff and 4 combat companies.
- On September 6, constituted then of one battalion counting 1000 men, the regiment became autonomous. The other two battalions were formed in the second half of September.
- On November 20, 1914, the command of the regiment was entrusted to Lieutenant-colonel Desgouille.
- Since the debut of December, the regiment counted 48 Officers, 2136 men, 179 horses, 62 vehicles and was organized in one general headquarter staff compromising three battalions, each constituting four combat companies. On December 10, the regiment was integrated in the command structure of the 28th French Infantry Division (French: 28^{e} Division d'infanterie, 28^{e} D.I) at the corps of the 56th Brigade in the region of Morcourt - Cappy - Méricourt-sur-Somme (Santerre- sector trenches of Frise ).
- On February 11, 1915, the effectifs were 46 Officers, 1883 men and 184 horses. The regiment witnessed a reorganization and decomposed to a headquarter staff, one company hors rang and two battalions, each with four combat companies (the former 2nd battalion reinforcing the other two).
- On March 30, the regiment joined Santerre ( region of Hangest-en-Santerre, Warvillers) and was put at under the disposition of the 26th French Infantry Division (French: 26^{e} Division d'infanterie, 28^{e} D.I) as a reserve component.
- On April 15, 1915, the regiment was put at the disposition of the 68 French Infantry Division (French: 68^{e} Division d'infanterie, 68^{e} D.I).
- On May 11, 1915, the regiment was attached to the 52nd Brigade (92nd Infantry Regiment and 139th Infantry Regiment) at Bus (Pas-de-Calais) and Tilloloy.
- Following the departure of the important forming contingents of Italians, Belgian and Russians towards their respective Armed Forces; the regiment was dissolved. On July 13, 1915, the regiment's last detachment counting 8 Officers, 952 men and 38 horses, where integrated in the 2nd Marching Regiment of the 1st Foreign Regiment (French: 2^{e} Régiment de Marche du 1^{er} Régiment Etranger, 2^{e}R.M.1^{er}R.E).

== Regimental Commanders ==
Period 1914-1915
3rd Marching Regiment of the 1st Foreign Regiment
3ème R.M.1^{er}R.E

- 1914 - 1914: Colonel Tiebault
- 1914 - 1915: Lieutenant-Colonel Desgouille

== Notable Officers and legionnaires ==
- Blaise Cendrars

== See also ==
- Major (France)
- French Foreign Legion Music Band (MLE)
- Marching Regiment of the Foreign Legion
- Canadian National Vimy Memorial
