= 1914–1918 Commemorative war medal (France) =

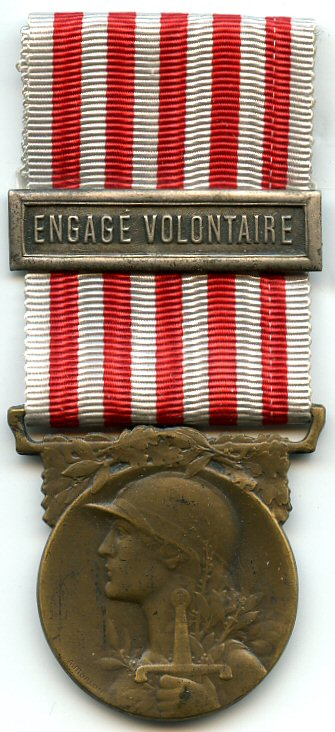
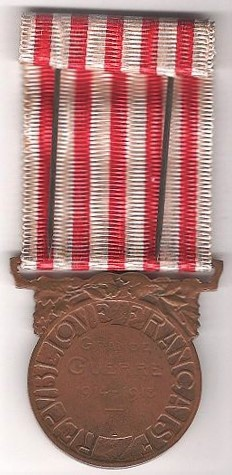
- Obverse with clasp ENGAGÉS VOLONTAIRES
- Type: Medal
- Awarded for: Service in World War I
- Presented by: France
- Established: 23 June 1920
- Ribbon of the 1914–1918 Commemorative war medal

Precedence
- Next (higher): Médaille commémorative des batailles de la Marne (1914-1918)
- Next (lower): Médaille commémorative de la bataille de la Somme

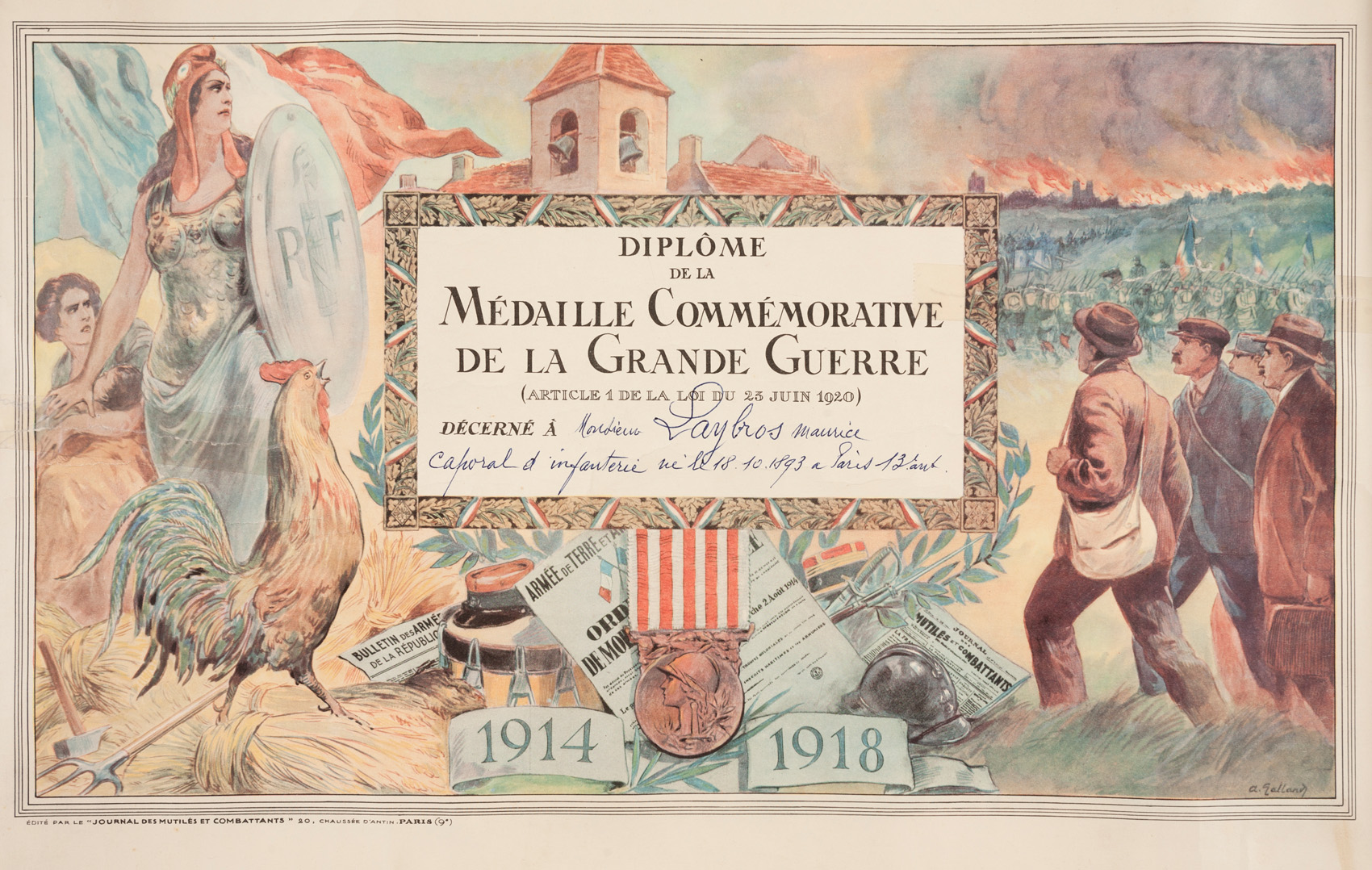
Certificate of award for the "Médaille Commémorative de la Grande Guerre" to a corporal in the Algerian Tirailleurs.

The 1914–1918 Commemorative war medal (French: "Médaille commémorative de la guerre 1914–1918") was awarded to soldiers and sailors for service in World War I. It was also awarded to civilians who met certain requirements. Created by Act of June 23, 1920, it was awarded to any military member for service between 2 August 1914 and November 11, 1918. It is also given to civilians who served in the same period in the army or the Interior.

An open competition was held for the design, with engravers presenting 73 models to the jury. The model of Pierre-Alexandre Morlon was ultimately adopted. The profile of the event was increased when the prestigious magazine L'Illustration pictured the six models selected in an article of January 29, 1921.

== Award statute ==
The 1914–1918 Commemorative war medal was awarded to those who served in the following conditions between August 2, 1914, and November 11, 1918:

- All French soldiers and sailors present under arms or on board French warships, and merchant seamen, what would have been the length of their mobilization.
- All foreign soldiers and sailors who served under French authority or aboard a French ship, excluding those that were posted there.
- Officers and active persons of additional land subdivision railways
- Nurses, doctors, pharmacists, managers of French or foreign nationality who served in the French army medical units or on a voluntary basis.
- Civil guards, police officers and firefighters of bombed cities, having been officially registered between those dates and to have fulfilled their duties during the bombing.
- Police officers of the City of Paris, The Seine, the inspectorate staff of the Paris Police, staff officers of the assets of the granting of Paris and civil guards, all of whom having been militarized by decree of 7, 9, 19 August and 21 September 1914.
- French soldiers who were abroad, who served in the ranks of the French Army, enlisting during the war in the Allied and Associated Armies of France.
- Colonial workers employed in the work of national defense in France, provided they have served a period of six months between the dates of eligibility.
- People of French or foreign nationality who served in the war zone in the works below designation, accredited to the French high command or under this command:
  - Various works, the soldier home, feeding station, etc.;
  - Knights of Columbus
  - American Red Cross
  - Mobile Sanitary Sections of the French Red Cross and foreigners in the French army
- Women drivers, telephonists and secretaries in the French Army, provided they were so employed for at least six months.

== Award description ==
The medal is round with a diameter of 33 mm. It is bronze. On the obverse, is an effigy of a youthful Minerva in profile, wearing the helmet of 1915, representing France. She is crowned with laurels and holding a sword in her left hand. There are bay leaves mixed with oak leaves at the top to join a horizontal slit, through which the ribbon passes and is attached to the medal.

On the reverse is the legend: GRANDE GUERRE 1914-1918, surrounded by the inscription REPUBLIQUE FRANÇAISE.

There was originally a clasp "Engagés Volontaires" for volunteer enlistees. It was replaced when the Croix du combattant volontaire 1914-1918 was established in 1935.

== See also ==
- Ribbons of the French military and civil awards
