= Volunteer Combatant's Cross 1914–1918 =

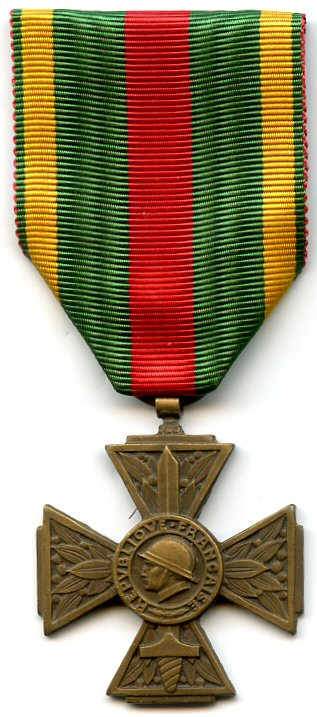
- Obverse bar of the Volunteer combatant's cross 1914–1918
- Type: Medal
- Awarded for: Volunteers for the war 1914–1918
- Presented by: France
- Established: 4 July 1935
- Ribbon of the Volunteer combatant's cross 1914–1918

Precedence
- Next (higher): Escapees' Medal
- Next (lower): Croix du combattant volontaire 1939–1945

The Volunteer Combatant's Cross 1914–1918 (French: "Croix du Combattant Volontaire 1914–1918") is a French decoration that recognizes those who volunteered to serve on the front in a combat unit during World War I. When the 1914–1918 Commemorative war medal (France) (French: "Médaille commémorative de la guerre 1914–1918") was established, it was anticipated that a clasp bearing the words, "ENGAGÉ VOLONTAIRE" (English: "VOLUNTEER ENLISTEE"), would be worn on its ribbon for those who had freely and voluntarily enlisted in the French Armed Forces for combat service. While the clasp was produced, it was short-lived due to parliament demanding the establishment of a special insignia to distinguish the special merit of the voluntary combatant.

The Act of 4 July 1935 created the Croix du Combattant Volontaire, designated for those who volunteered to serve on the front in a combat unit during the Great War.

== Award statute ==
The requirements for obtaining the cross were defined by the decree of 28 November 1935.

The qualifications of the candidates have been reviewed by a panel from 1951, twelve members as follows:

- Minister of National Defence: Chairman;
- Secretary of State for War: two members;
- Secretary of State for the Navy: two members;
- Secretary of State for Air: two members;
- Office national des mutilés et combattants: two members;
- Association d'engagés et de combattants volontaires: three members.

The decree of 10 April 1936 extended the award to the few surviving volunteer firefighters from the War of 1870–1871.

The Volunteer combatant's cross 1914–1918 is considered a war decoration during the review of applications for Légion d'honneur, la Médaille militaire and l'Ordre national du Mérite.

== Award description ==
A cross with four arms in bronze, 36 mm wide. Engraved by Frédéric de Vernon.

On the obverse: a round central medallion with the legend surrounding REPUBLIQUE FRANCAISE:

- Effigy of a helmeted Poilu (World War I infantryman), on a sword drawn vertically on the branches
- Of the cross being charged with bay leaves and oak leaves in relief.

On the reverse: inside the central medallion, a branch of laurel is surrounded by the inscription: COMBATTANT VOLONTAIRE 1914–1918.

The cross arms are covered with leaves of laurel and oak forming relief.

A special version was made for the volunteer fighters from the war of 1870–1871 with the dates 1870–1871 on the back replacing those of 1914–1918.

== See also ==
- Ribbons of the French military and civil awards
