= Front (military) =

Military term with several meanings

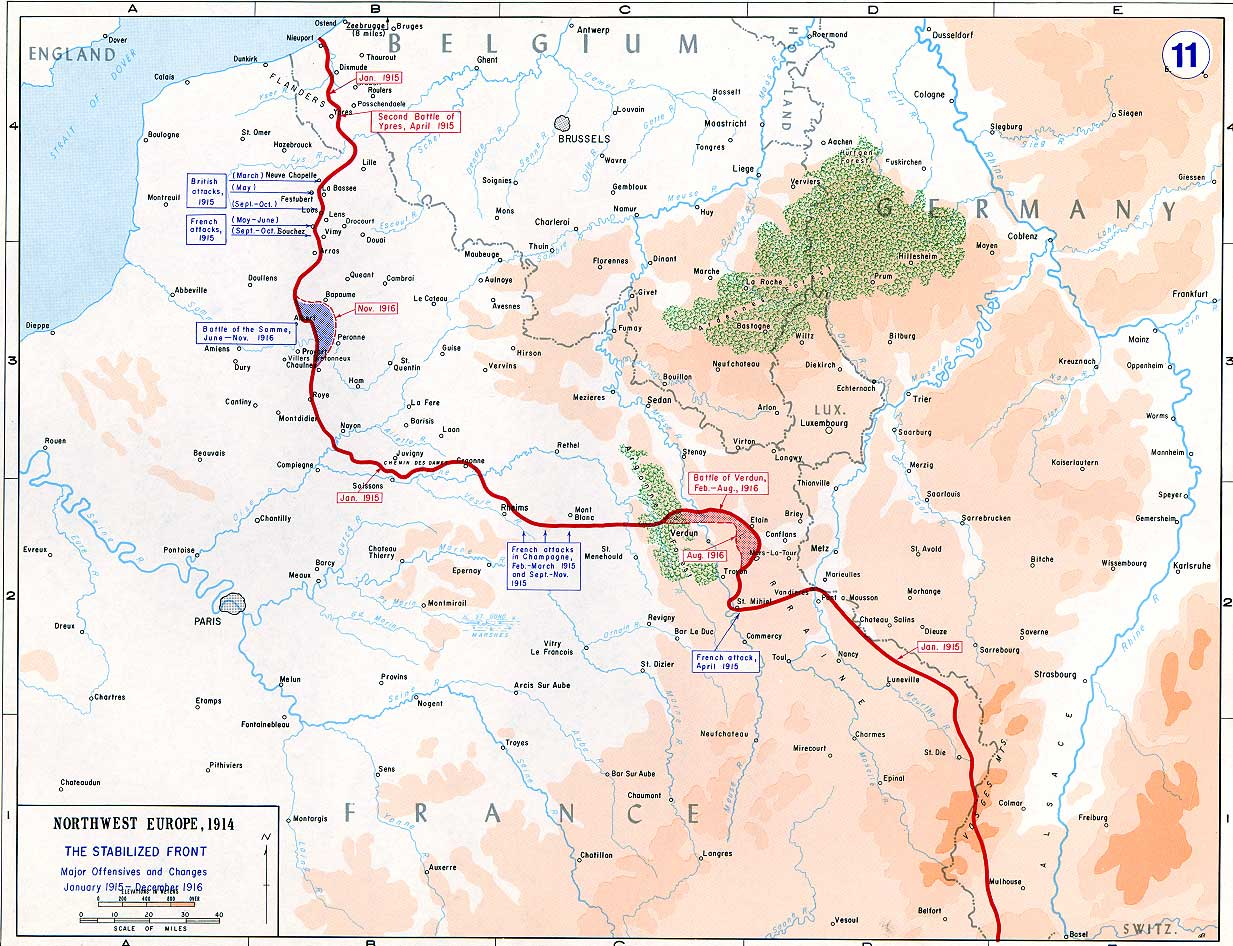
The Western Front in 1915–16

In a military context, the term front can have several meanings. According to official US Department of Defense and NATO definitions, a front can be "the line of contact of two opposing forces." This front line can be a local or tactical front, or it can range to a theater. An example of the latter was the Western Front in France and Belgium in World War I.

Relatedly, front can refer to the direction of the enemy or, in the absence of combat, the direction towards which a military unit is facing. Conversely, the term "home front" has been used to denote conditions in the civilian sector of a country at war, including those involved in the production of matériel.

Front can also refer to the lateral space occupied by a military unit as measured from the extremity of one flank to the other. The amount of front occupied by a unit depends on many factors, including time period and available technology. For example, under the military doctrine of the Soviet Army and those which copied it, the amount front occupied by an attacking unit depended on its size. A division attacking with three regiments in the first echelon would maintain an attack zone of 15 to 25 kilometers wide. A regiment's front was typically 4 to 5 kilometers wide, but could vary between 3 and 8 kilometers. This frontage decreased with each smaller unit involved: 2 to 3 kilometers for a battalion, 500 to 800 meters for a company, and 100 to 200 meters for a platoon.

Additionally, the Soviet Army used the term "front" to mean an army group; the Polish Armies used the same terminology during the Polish-Soviet War and World War II.

== See also ==
- Rear (military)
