= 9 Parachute Squadron RE =

Airborne unit of the British army

9 Parachute Squadron
- Brigade insignia of the 16 Air Assault Brigade Combat Team, also used by 9 Parachute Squadron.
- Active: 6 March 1772 – present
- Country: Great Britain (1772–1800); United Kingdom (1801–present)
- Branch: British Army
- Type: Airborne forces
- Role: Combat engineering
- Part of: Royal Engineers; 1st (UK) Division; 16 Air Assault Brigade Combat Team; 23 Parachute Engineer Regiment
- Engagements: Great Siege of Gibraltar; Kaffir Wars; Crimean War; Siege of Sevastopol; World War I; Retreat from Mons; First Battle of the Marne; First Battle of the Aisne; Battle of Armentières; Second Battle of Ypres; Battle of St. Julien; Battle of Frezenberg; Battle of Bellewaarde; Battle of the Somme; Battle of Albert; Battle of Le Transloy; Battle of Arras; Third Battle of Ypres (Passchendaele); Battle of Polygon Wood; Battle of Broodseinde; Battle of Poelcappelle; First Battle of Bapaume; Battle of the Lys; Battle of Hazebrouck; Battle of Béthune; Second Battle of the Somme; Battle of the Scarpe; Battle of Drocourt-Quéant Line; Battle of the Canal du Nord; Battle of the Selle; Battle of Valenciennes; World War II; Operation Freshman; Operation Ladbroke; Operation Slapstick; Operation Market Garden; Operation Sheepskin (Anguilla); Operation Banner (The Northern Ireland Troubles); Falklands War; Battle of Mount Longdon; Battle of Mount Tumbledown; UN Mission in Rwanda (Operation Gabriel); Macedonia Insurgency; Operation Telic (Iraq War); Operation Branta (MFO Egypt); War in Afghanistan (2001–2021); Operation Fingal; Operation Herrick; Operation Herrick IV; Operation Herrick VIII; Operation Pitting (UK Evacuation of civilians from Afghanistan)

Commanders
- Current commander: Maj C J Swanwick
- Notable commanders: Peter Wall (British Army officer)

Insignia
- DZ flash pre-2008

- DZ flash today

9 Parachute Squadron RE (often abbreviated to '9 Sqn') is an airborne squadron of the British Army's Corps of Royal Engineers. It is part of 23 Parachute Engineer Regiment based at Rock Barracks in Woodbridge, Suffolk, and provides close engineer support to 16 Air Assault Brigade Combat Team. It traces its heritage to the first Soldier Artificer Company raised in Gibraltar in 1772. The squadron remains the longest continually serving in-role fighting unit in Airborne Forces.

== Early history, 1772–1914 ==
Soldier Artificer Company Orders of Dress 1786

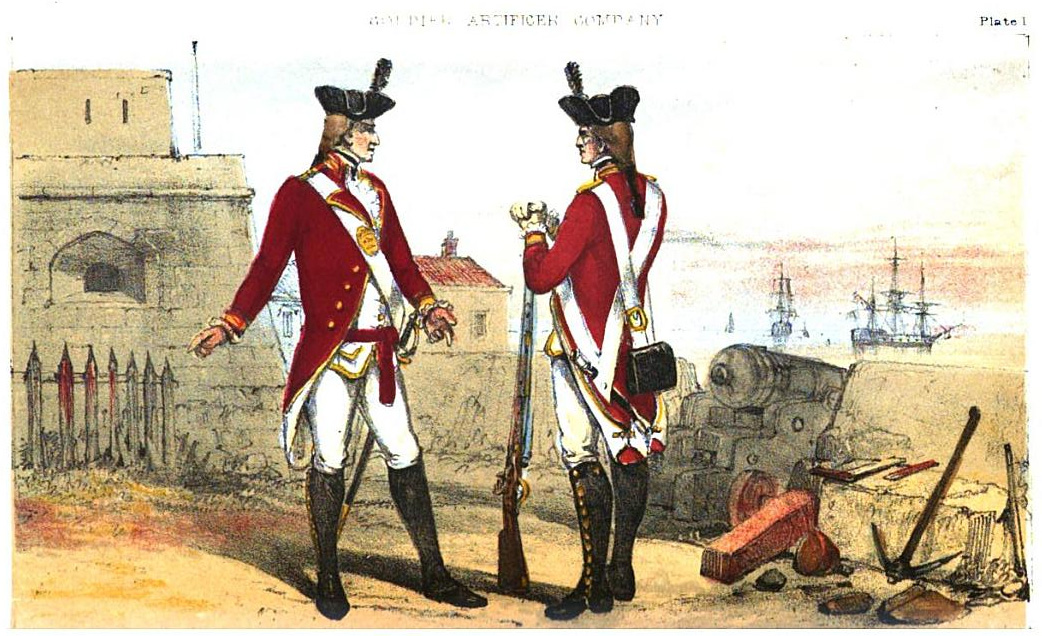
Uniform

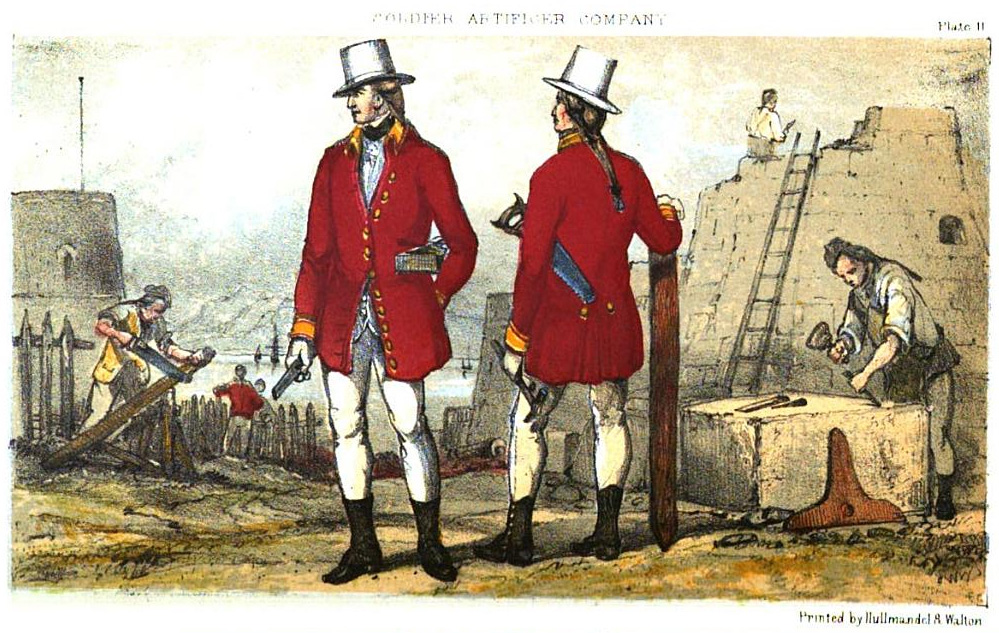
Working Dress

=== Soldier Artificer Company of Gibraltar, 1772–1797 ===
9 Parachute Squadron RE trace their lineage to 6 March 1772 when a royal warrant raised an unnamed Company of Soldier Artificers, transferring suitable men from the regiments in the Gibraltar Garrison. The initial company strength was 71 soldiers, to be commanded by officers of the Corps of Engineers. Sergeant Thomas Bridges was to be the first sergeant-major of the company, being a man well qualified, "not only to oversee the working duties of the Company, but also to drill the personnel in the exercise of small arms as may in the most effectual manner enable them to assist in defending the work they might be repairing." The company gradually increased in strength and, during the Great Siege of Gibraltar, proved its effectiveness. In 1786 the company was 275 men strong, so was divided into two. On 25 April 1787 a royal warrant granted officers the "royal" title, so that the corps became the Corps of Royal Engineers. On 10 October 1787, six further companies were raised in England. Two more again were raised in 1793.

=== Absorbed into Corps of Military Artificers and Labourers (other ranks), 1797–1804 ===
The two existing companies in Gibraltar (of which one would become the title of this page) were incorporated into the Corps of Military Artificers and Labourers (other ranks) in 1797. At this point they lost their scarlet coats, worn since their formation, for blue coats instead. A year later the Corps of Military Artificers and Labourers (other ranks) was renamed Corps of Royal Military Artificers.

=== Epidemic of 1804 ===
Gibraltar suffered a yellow fever epidemic between September and December 1804 which killed a third of the population, including many soldier artificers of the company. The company was reinforced with new artificers from the United Kingdom, who arrived by ship in February 1806 alongside their new commander, Captain Henry Evatt of the Corps of Royal Engineers A similar fever would strike in 1813.

=== Assignment of the number '9' to their name, 1806 ===
On 5 September 1806, a decision was made to identify the Artificer Companies by numbers. Captain Henry Evatt's company was named 9th Field Company. The unit strength was subsequently increased from 100 to 126.

=== Demolition of the Lines of Contravallation of Gibraltar, 1810 ===
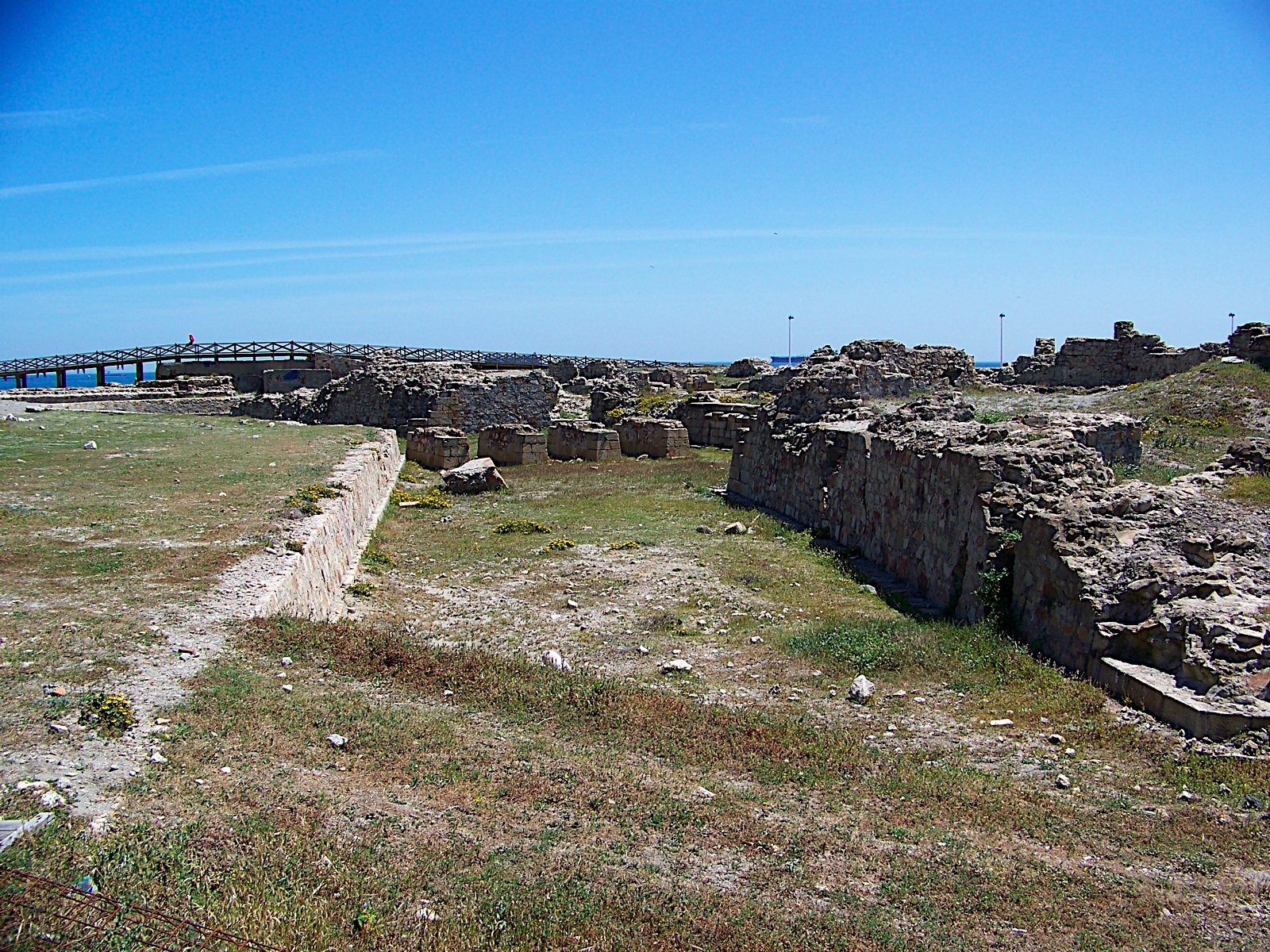
Ruins of St. Barbara Fort, destroyed with work from 9th Field Company

The Lines of Contravallation of Gibraltar were a set of fortifications built by the Spanish in the 1730s across the northern part of the isthmus linking Spain with Gibraltar, in order to prevent British incursions. By 1810, the Spanish had switched focus to defending themselves from the mutual enemy of France, so the Lieutenant-Governor of Gibraltar received permission to have the fortifications destroyed so as not to aid the French if they made it to Gibraltar.

A detachment from the 9th and 10th Field Company were set to work. It took several days for teams of sappers to install demolition charges in and around the walls, casemates, batteries and towers of the Lines. On the evening of 14 February 1810, thousands of people crowded onto Gibraltar's walls and bastions to watch the demolitions taking place. As a report in The London Chronicle noted, "every part of the garrison facing the Spanish Lines was crowded with Spectators, to witness the explosion which was truly grand and picturesque ... the entire front of Forts San Felipe and Santa Bárbara being blown into the ditch, and the whole rendered a complete mass of ruins."

=== Evolution to the Corps of Royal Engineers and move to the UK, 1812–1856 ===
In 1812 the Corps of Royal Military Artificers was renamed Royal Military Artificers or Sappers and Miners (other ranks). In 1813 they were renamed again to the Royal Sappers and Miners (other ranks).

In 1822, the company was relocated from Gibraltar to Woolwich.

In 1856, the Corps of Royal Engineers absorbed the artificers to have the profession named as it is today. From this day, the private ranks of the company were to be known as sappers.

The company is known to have served in the Kaffir Wars, the Crimean War, Bermuda, Halifax, Nova Scotia and Hong Kong.

=== Second Boer War 1899–1902 ===
9th Field Company is documented to have been divisional troops to the 7th Division on 11 February 1900 during the Second Boer War.

== First World War, 1914–1918 ==
The company were mobilised with the 4th Division for the First World War in August 1914. At that time they were organised into a Squadron HQ with four sections, each commanded by a subaltern.

=== Deployment ===
On 10 August 1914, 9th Field Company received orders to depart from their base at Woolwich to Ipswich. They were tasked to defend a portion of East Anglia. From 12 to 18 August they were stationed at Woodbridge, which coincidentally is the town near to where the subunit would be based a century later.

On 19 August they travelled by train from Ipswich to Harrow. They embarked on a train to Southampton, then at 4.30pm on the 22 August they boarded the SS Basil to France and the ship captain read them the King's message:

You are leaving home to fight for the safety and honour of my Empire. Belgium, whose country we are pledged to defend, has been attacked and France is about to be invaded by the same powerful foe. I have implicit confidence in you my Soldiers. Duty is your watchword, and I know your duty will be nobly done. I shall follow your every movement with deepest interest and mark with eager satisfaction your daily progress; indeed your welfare will never be absent from my thoughts. I pray God bless you and guard you and bring you back victorious. George, R.I.

They disembarked at Rouen the next evening. Subsequently, they were transported by train to Saint-Quentin, Aisne before marching northwards to bivouac for the evening of 25 August, while artillery fire rung out in the distance.

=== Retreat from Mons ===
9th Field Company marched Northwards the next day and met up with the rest of the 4th Division near Le Cateau; however, they shortly afterwards began retracing their route southwards as part of the Great Retreat. As part of the delaying action in the retreat, detachments from the company were tasked to demolish bridges along the way to slow the German advance as follows:

9th Field Company Bridge Demolitions during the Great Retreat
Commander	Location	Preparation Started	Outcome
Lt Fishbourne	Ourscamp	29 August	Demolished 30 August.
Capt Westland	Bailly	29 August	Orders from 2nd Army Corps to cancel the demolition and remove the charges.
Lt Young	Compiègne	30 August	Demolished 31 August.
Maj Barstow with Lt Fishbourne	Bailly	30 August	Unsuccessful as attacked by a German picket resulting in the death of Maj Barstow. Cpl Stone left injured and later captured. Lt Fishbourne (unscathed) escaped with 3 others (injured) back to the company.

Capt Westland's section were sent to prepare the bridge at Bailly on 29 August. On arrival they set out pickets and prepared the charges. They then monitored the bridge as retreating British forces extracted over it. At 3.45am on 30 August Westland received orders to send his section back to the company. Westland remained behind with Cpl Goodfellow. At 10.30am he received written orders from 2nd Army Corps to not destroy the bridge, and these orders were to overrule any other orders he received. They received orders to return to the company at 5.30pm.

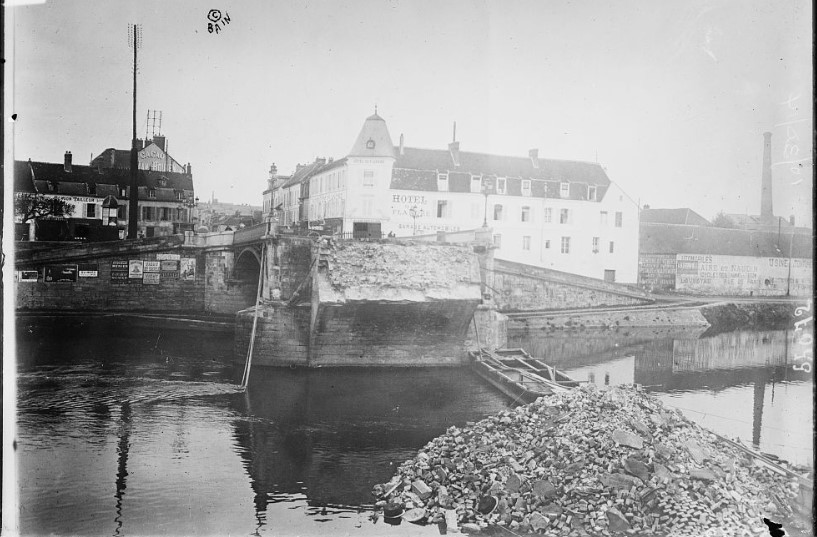
Bridge at Compiègne demolished by 9th Field Company RE

The bridge at Compiègne was destroyed by a team commanded by Lt Young. At midday on 30 August, Lt Young, his sergeant and eight sappers cycled with tool carts to the bridge from Trosly-Breuil, arriving at 5pm. Young had been ordered to report to General Headquarters B.E.F. but found they had already started their retreat. He headed to the bridge and found the Engineer-in-Chief. He introduced him to a French officer who provided details of the explosives that had been delivered by train, then Young was tasked with his small team to prepare the bridge for demolition, whilst keeping it open for the traffic of retreating troops. Fortunately, he found that the bridge had been designed for quick demolition, with cylindrical shafts in each pier available for rapid insertion of explosive (hidden underneath the hardcore placed on top of the bridge). They worked through the night to prepare the bridge, with it ready for firing shortly before sunrise. After first light 31 August, Young sent the rest of the section back to the company and he remained in place as demolition commander. By 10am, most of the traffic had stopped, with the few stragglers exclaiming that the Germans were close behind. At 11am, the Engineer-in-Chief gave permission for the bridge to be destroyed. From Young's firing position the far side of the bridge could not be seen due to the camber of the bridge. As Young pressed down the handle of the exploder, a refugee cart crested the bridge; however, the exploder failed to work. By luck of the refugee, a brass contact plate on the exploder had fractured off. As such, Young used his alternate means of non-electric initiation and the demolition was successful. He extracted away by car, finding the company near Saint-Sauveur.

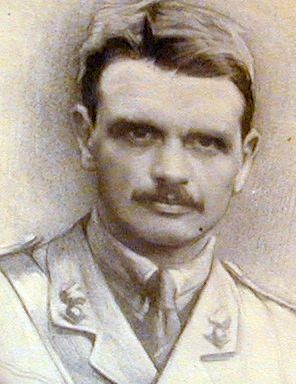
Major John Baillie Barstow, Officer Commanding. Killed in action 31 August 1914.

Meanwhile, at 9pm on the 30 August, Lt Fishbourne was tasked to prepare 4 bridges on the River Oise for demolition, starting with the one at Bailly that Westland had previously rigged for demolition but had received orders from 2nd Army Corps to cancel. Fishbourne and his party from 9th Field Company were due to meet with an infantry escort and a truck; however, the infantry never arrived and the truck was almost empty of petrol. Fishbourne and his team nonetheless made a start out to the location of the bridge, and Maj Barstow, the officer commanding the squadron, found more petrol and followed up afterwards. They parked their vehicles 2 miles from the bridge and marched in file towards it. The party was fired at by an unseen German picket at approximately 1am on 31 August. Maj Barstow was killed and Cpl Stone badly injured so both were left behind. Cpl Stone was captured and was released after the war. Of the remainder, 3 were injured; however, they managed to conduct a fighting withdrawal back to the vehicles. Under Fishbourne, they arrived back at Company HQ at 5am. The company second-in-command, Capt G F Evans, took command of the company until a new OC was despatched.

9th Field Company were ordered to move out to the high ground overlooking Saintines on the evening of 31 August. They slept there, but were awoken by gunfire in the early hours. Preparing to move off, a German Uhlan was seen by the company's sentry and killed. The company continued to retreat by foot with the remainder of the division, reaching Lagny by 9am on 3 September. With no time to rest, the sappers were put to work providing water supply. Later they continued their retreat, concluding at Chevry at 3pm on 5 September.

=== First Battle of the Marne ===
Improvised Bridge over the Marne built by 7th and 9th Field Companies

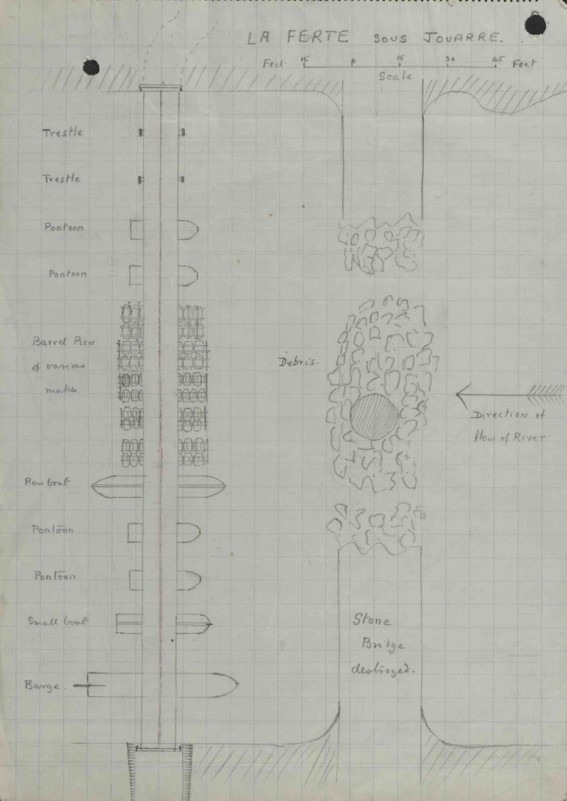
Plan taken from 9th Field Company War Diary

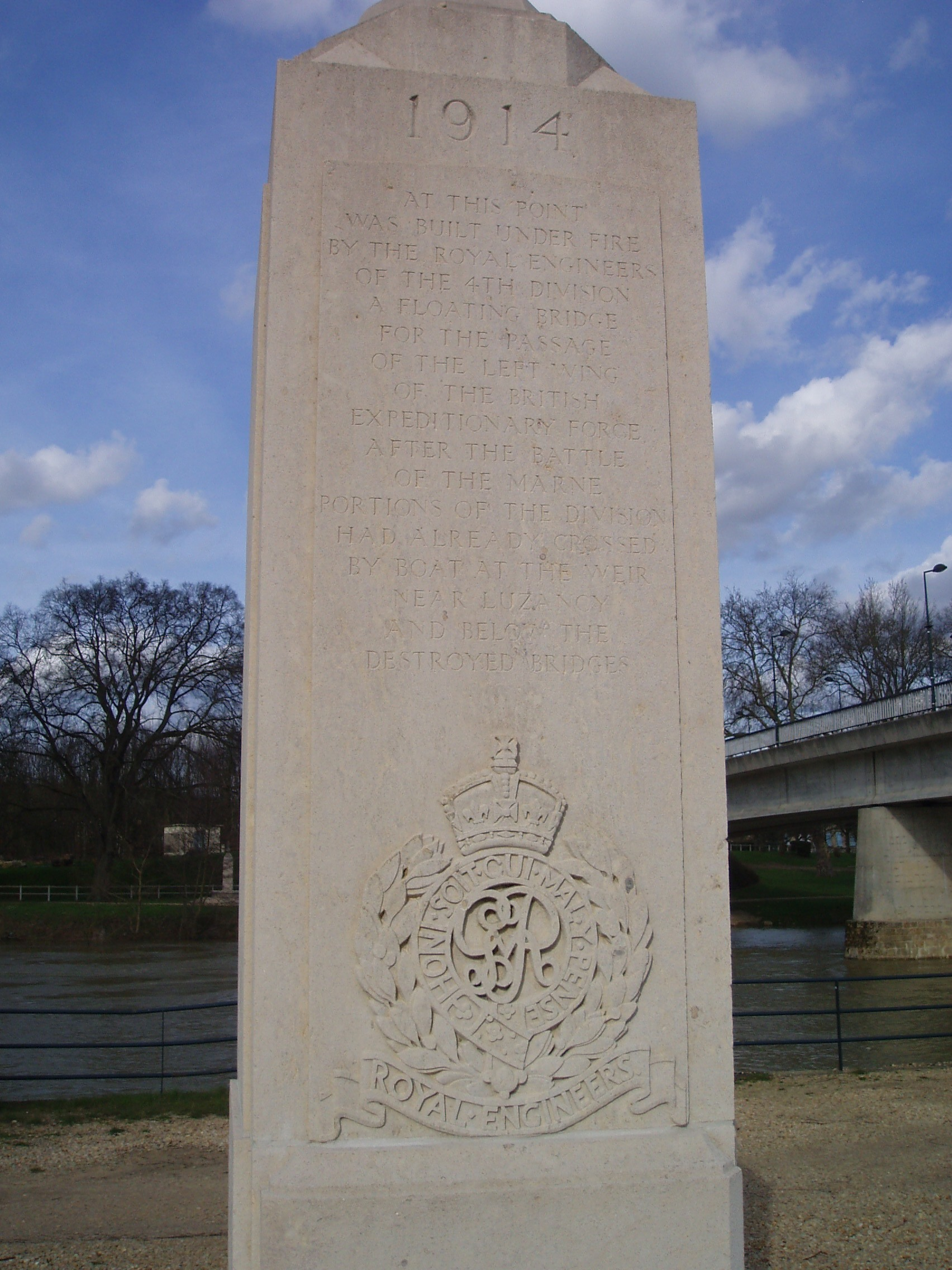
One of the RE Memorials on each side of the river

9th Field Company joined the 11th Brigade on 8 September to begin the advance back to Marne. At 8.30pm the company was ordered to prepare defensive positions in Jouarre, emplacing trenches and machine-gun posts. The company worked the whole night. The next morning, they were further tasked to move down to La Ferté-sous-Jouarre to bridge the River Marne, after the original bridge had been destroyed during the British retreat earlier. They were to work alongside the 7th Field Company due to the scale of bridge (218 feet). There were difficulties in starting the construction due to an enemy presence causing fighting within the town. Infantry was ferried across the river to clear the remaining enemy on the far side of the only possible bridging location. While awaiting the clearance of the far bank, the company scavenged the town for material to bridge with, finding planks and barrels. They reported finding drunk German soldiers in some of the cellars. Bridge construction began at 5.45pm on 9 September. 9th Company constructed the pontoons and barrel piers and the 7th Company the barges, boats and the approaches. The bridge was complete by 6.30am the next day, a massive construction in the 12 hours they had. The division crossed at once, and the company spent the entire day maintaining the bridge while it was endlessly trafficked by the advancing forces. At 4.30am the next morning, they were ordered to retrieve their bridging equipment and catch up with the division ahead of them.

=== First Battle of the Aisne ===
9th Field Company set off at 8am on 11 September. They stopped in Montigny to be joined by their new Officer Commanding, Maj D M Hoysted. They continued their march to St. Quentin, arriving at 9pm. The company were glad to receive a delivery of mail that evening. They set off again at 4.30am the next morning and reached Tigny by 7pm on 12 September. On arrival, Maj Hoysted and Capt Westland set off to reconnoitre a crossing for the River Aisne. At 3.30am on the 13 September they marched onwards again to Septmonts, then at 9am the next morning departed for Venizel, all the while battling against mud and traffic to get their bridging equipment through. On the descent into Venizel, the column was attacked by German artillery, and they stopped on multiple occasions to repair the road to allow the advance of the force. The 190 ft. floating bridge was started at noon and finished by 5pm.

Additionally, the existing road bridge at Venizel had been damaged by a partial demolition during the German withdrawal. When elements of the company arrived at the scene, Lt Giffard Le Quesne Martel (who would later gain renown as a tank strategist) removed the dud charges that had failed to fire and used some suitably shaped stones to plug the gaps in the compression girders that had been damaged. These were then further repaired by the company. Afterwards, a sapper manhandled a field-gun over to prove that the fixes were suitable, allowing the bridge to be declared fit for light traffic.

The company maintained the bridges, having some difficulty when an artillery gun fell off the floating bridge, causing damage to the structure. On 14 September additional bridge supplies arrived so a pontoon bridge could be constructed. That evening, accommodation was secured within the town and the company were able to remove their clothing for the first time since arriving in Rouen (22 days). Along with maintaining the 3 bridges, the company also prepared defensive positions for artillery. On 17 September blankets arrived for the troops, and the company were tasked to build a 4th bridge for infantry traffic. On 21 September, all existing bridges had to be extended in length as the river flooded due to heavy rain. A 5th, 6th and 7th bridge was built on 25, 29 and 30 September respectively.

An 8th bridge was to be constructed under a team commanded by Lt Giffard Le Quesne Martel, with planning starting on the 27 September. This would be the most advanced bridge of the collection. The team went to the boundary between the French and British divisions in Soissons to inspect the damage to an old stone bridge there. A design utilising wooden lattice-work girders was agreed on 30 September, with works completed on 8 October. This bridge survived the war and became known as the "Englishman's Bridge" (Le Pont des Anglaise). The modern bridge today shares the same name.

=== Battle of Armentières ===
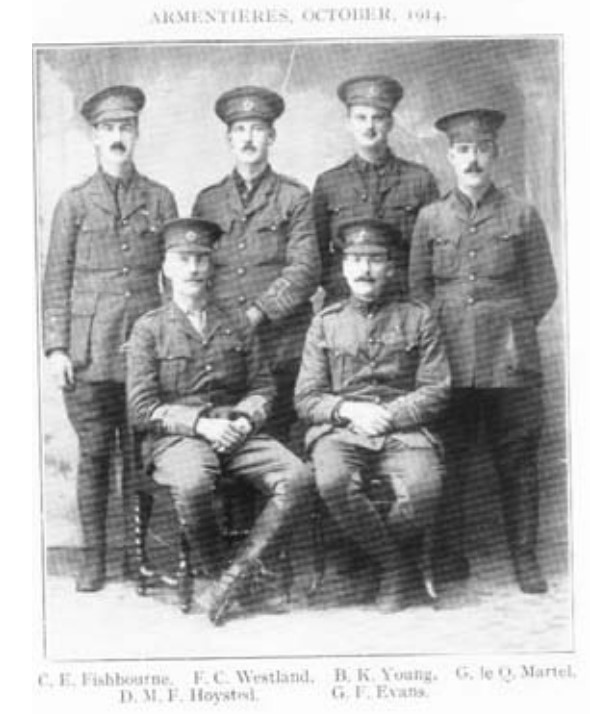
Officers of 9th Field Company RE, October 1914.

== Second World War, 1939–1945 ==
The outbreak of the Second World War in 1939 saw 9 Field Company RE in France once again, still as part of the 4th Division. It took part in the evacuation of the British Expeditionary Force from Dunkirk. 9 Field Company RE left the division on 16 February 1940.

In May 1942, it was reorganised as 9 Field Company RE (Airborne). 9 Field Company RE (Airborne) became the engineer support for the newly formed 1st Airlanding Brigade of the 1st Airborne Division, with about one third of the company being trained in the use of parachutes while the rest were trained as glider-borne troops.

=== Operation Freshman, 1942 ===
The unit's first airborne operation was in Norway in 1942 when they were sent as Operation Freshman to destroy a heavy water plant. However, both gliders crash landed, and the few survivors were executed by the Gestapo.

9 Field Company RE (Airborne) also took part in further airborne operations in North Africa.

=== Operations Ladroke and Husky, 1943 ===
9 Field Company RE (Airborne) took part in the glider landing operation (Operation Ladbroke) to facilitate the Allied Invasion of Sicily on Operation Husky. As part of the 1st Airlanding Brigade, 9 Field Company RE (Airborne) were some of the first troops to arrive after departing from Malta at 6pm on 9 July. Due to high winds, misjudgement from pilots and friendly fire from allied ships, the majority of the gliders landed in the sea. One successful glider containing sappers of 9 Field Company under command of Maj Basil Saunders Beazley (who had previously rowed for England in the 1938 British Empire Games) landed in a tomato plantation near Ponte Grande. They fought through to the bridge under enemy fire. The bridge was captured at 5am, the demolition charges drawn, and the area held, in spite of counterattacks by the Italians. The embattled sappers held out until the arrival of 5th Division on 10 July. Of the total strength of 8 officers and 65 men, only 19 survived. Maj Basil Saunders Beazley was killed in action on the afternoon of 10 July. The survivors returned to North Africa to be reconstituted.

=== Operation Slapstick, 1943 ===
Operation Slapstick was the code name for the British landing from the sea at the Italian port of Taranto. A shortage of transport aircraft meant the 1st Airborne Division could not land in their traditional way by parachute and glider, and all the landing craft in the area were already allocated to the other landings. As such they were transported by ships of the Royal Navy. Before leaving Tunisia, the 1st Airborne Division was divided into two-halves. The first half, consisting of the divisional headquarters, the 1st and 4th Parachute Brigade groups and the 9 Field Company RE (Airborne), boarded the Royal Navy ships at Bizerta. The ships departed at 5pm on 8 September.

The landing was unopposed and the division successfully captured the port of Taranto. 9 Field Company RE (Airborne) were tasked with the unfamiliar work of operating Taranto docks until the arrival of a Port Construction and Repair Company.

=== Operation Market Garden, 1944 ===
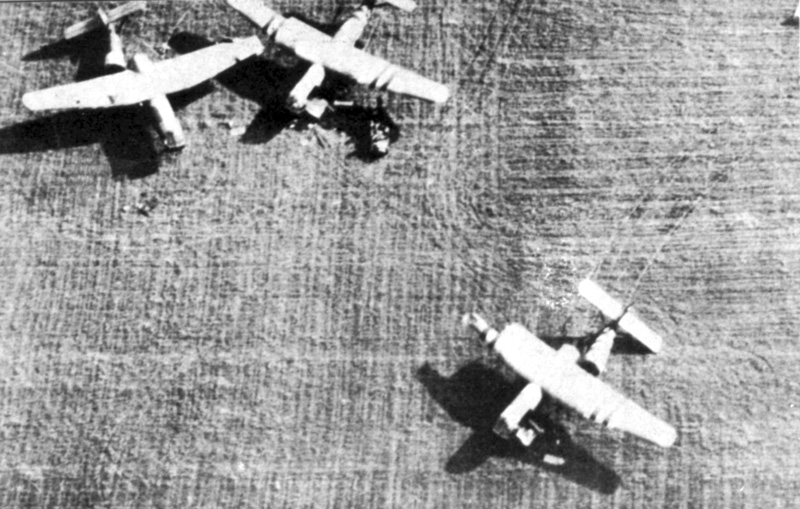
Airspeed Horsas on the ground at Arnhem during Operation Market Garden.

9 Field Company RE (Airborne) returned to the UK in November 1943 to prepare for the invasion of Europe. They were billeted near Coningsby, Lincolnshire and were tasked with constructing accommodation for the 1st Parachute Brigade while awaiting to invade Europe. They were frequently brought to a state of readiness as planned operations were repeatedly cancelled.

Finally, Operation Market Garden came. A small detachment of the company were detached to the 1st Parachute Brigade Recce Squadron, with the task to neutralise charges on bridges. Once complete they would revert to command of Company HQ. The remaining majority of the company were in the 1st Airlanding Brigade. The company enplaned their Horsa Gliders on the morning of 17 September 1944 at Keevil Airfield, as part of the first lift. The majority of the unit landed safely approximately 5 miles north-east of the centre of Arnhem at Landing Zones 'S' and 'Z'. Glider no. 385, containing the armoured jeeps which were to facilitate the coup de main on the main bridge, was forced to make an emergency landing in England. Glider no. 380, containing Company HQ, had a sudden landing at Arnhem which resulted in the death of Spr Holdstock and injury of Sgt Paffett and Spr Robertson. A memorial exists in Farrington Gurney to glider no. 390 containing 21 members of 1st Platoon that crashed and died there.

Capt Roger Binyon was in command of the 1st Platoon. Reinforced by other members of the company, he was tasked to attack the Hotel Wolfheze which was the intended site of Maj Winchester's Company HQ. The platoon came under heavy fire on approaching the building, as it happened to be the HQ of a SS Panzer Battalion, with approximately 300 men stationed around there. The men of 9th Field Company had initial success in the firefight, until the German positions were reinforced by more experienced troops.

2nd Platoon was under the command of Capt Eric O'Callaghan MC. OC 9 Field Company RE (Airborne) gave them orders to seize and hold the railway ridge over the Rhine and to remove any demolition charges. O'Callaghan launched the attack on the railway bridge at 6pm, with support provided by a platoon from C Company 2nd Parachute Battalion. As the combined assaults reached the bridge the enemy demolished the centre span. Miraculously no casualties were sustained in the blast. With no railway bridge left to defend, O'Callaghan decided to fight from house to house towards the main bridge. On arrival, 2 platoon joined forces with the 1st Parachute Squadron RE and took up positions in the school house close to the bridge. With all their ammunition intact, they played a significant role in the defence of the bridge, one sapper having knocked out six or seven armoured vehicles with a Piat anti-tank gun. For 3 days they held out in the buildings, short on food and supplies. The building was mostly destroyed by tank strikes and fires had to be repeatedly put out. O'Callaghan led an assault on a machine-gun detachment, and, when an enemy infantryman charged at him through a window, he shot him dead – but such was the momentum of the onslaught that the man's boot caught O'Callaghan full in the face and broke his nose. O'Callaghan was later knocked concussed and awoke as he was taken as a prisoner of war.

Another detachment of the company held a ferry at Heveadorp. They held this position until the afternoon of the 20th when they were driven out by enemy with flame throwers. On the afternoon of the 21st paratroopers of the 1st Independent Parachute Brigade (Poland) landed on the south of the river and hoped to cross at Heveadorp. Unsuccessful attempts were made by 9 Field Company RE (Airborne) to ferry them on improvised rafts made out of jeep trailers. Further attempts were made the next night utilising 6 reconnaissance boats with attached signal cable to pull the Poles across; however, the cable snapped in the strong current. Sappers finally rowed backwards and forwards, bringing one Pole at a time. By dawn, when ferrying had to stop, 60 Poles had been got across.

9 Field Company RE (Airborne) was used as the counter-attack force by Lt Col John Frost, the Commanding Officer of 2nd Battalion The Parachute Regiment, where they fought with great bravery in the infantry role. Unfortunately, they took heavy casualties. Of the original Company of 215 All Ranks, only 57 men returned to the UK, the remainder being captured or killed.

== Second half of 20th century, 1945–2000 ==
=== Post Second World War, 1945–1956 ===
On VE Day, 1st Airborne Division was ordered to Norway to accept the surrender of the 400,000 German soldiers there. On 1 June 1945 the squadron moved into the command of the 6th Airborne Division.

After VJ Day 9th Airborne Squadron went to Palestine. The squadron had a difficult time in Palestine, being sent to clear the King David Hotel in Jerusalem after the bomb attack. In Palestine the squadron lost three men killed in action.

9 Independent Airborne Squadron RE accompanied the division to Germany, then returned to the UK to be based at Aldershot Garrison from 30 August 1949.

In 1955 the squadron was renamed to 9 Independent Parachute Field Squadron RE. A further change occurred when the "Field" was dropped from the title in 1958.

=== Suez Crisis, 1956 ===
In November 1956 the squadron took part in Operation Musketeer, the invasion of Egypt by the UK and France in response to the Suez Crisis. On 5 November, 3 Troop (under command of Captain Brazier) conducted a parachute jump alongside 3 PARA onto the El Gamil airfield. The remainder of the squadron joined them the next day.

=== Early 1960s ===
From 1960 to 1965 the squadron deployed to Kuwait, Bahrain, Greece, Aden and Borneo.

In early 1964 the Sqn deployed to Cyprus as part of the United Nations Peacekeeping force during the Cyprus crisis of 1963–64. Later in 1964 16th Parachute Brigade, with 9 Independent Parachute Squadron, came under command of 3 Infantry Division.

The squadron were the Army Minor Units Small Arms Champions of 1966.

=== SS Torrey Canyon, 1967 ===
In March 1967, 9 Independent Parachute Squadron was involved in the clearance of several Cornish beaches after a giant oil spill from the tanker SS Torrey Canyon.

=== Anguilla, 1967 ===
The West Indies Act 1967, also known as the "Associated Statehood Act", gave British "associated state" status to the Crown Colony of Saint Christopher-Nevis-Anguilla, consisting of three British-administered Caribbean islands. Unhappy with being governed by the two more-populated islands, disgruntled civilians ejected the police from Anguilla and declared that they were severing all constitutional links with the new government. Following a visit by Prime Minister Harold Wilson, the UK agreed with the islands' government to send in troops and police to restore official law and order under Operation Sheepskin.

A section from 9 Independent Parachute Squadron alongside two companies of 2nd Battalion Parachute Regiment and 22 members of the Metropolitan Police were put ashore on 18 March via landing craft from frigates standing off at sea. They moved inland on foot to secure Wall Blake airstrip and await the airlanding of their heavy equipment. The invasion was completely uncontested as the islanders wanted to be British. As such, the sappers made use of themselves improving public utilities.

=== Kenya, 1968–1969 ===
In November 1968, 9 Parachute Squadron deployed for 4 months to the Mau Escarpment area in Kenya to construct bridges and repair culverts.

=== Guernsey, 1969–1970 ===
From 1969 to 1970 the squadron deployed to Guernsey to conduct rock blasting and bridge building tasks. The rock blasting was conducted in Beaucette quarry and received scrutiny in parliament, with the task perceived to be non-compliant with UK Defence Civil-military co-operation policy.

=== Northern Ireland, 1970–1977 ===
The squadron deployed on 6 separate tours to Northern Ireland in the 1970s under Operation Banner.

Squadron Involvement on Operation Banner in the 1970s
Start date	End date	Location	Remarks
12 May 1970	8 September 1970	Antrim	Sqn praised for rapid construction of peace line in the Ardoyne area, sealing off side streets to the Crumlin Road.
14 September 1971	11 January 1972	Antrim	Condor Tp, 59 Indep Cdo Sqn RE attached. Under Operation Ashburton, 9 squadron erected barriers and cratered roads to restrict movement across the Irish border.
20 March 1973	24 July 1973	Antrim	Diving team surveyed all the navigable underground waterways of East Belfast due to the risk they might be used to store weapons and ammunition.
13 October 1974	13 February 1975	Castledillon, Armagh	
25 January 1976	9 March 1976	Undisclosed	
11 October 1976	10 February 1977	Castledillon, Armagh	

=== Subordination, 1976–1977 ===
Due to the restructuring of 16th Parachute Brigade, in 1976 the squadron lost its independence and came under command of 36 Engineer Regiment. It adopted its present-day name of 9 Parachute Squadron RE in April 1977.

=== Canada, 1977 ===
After returning from Northern Ireland, the squadron deployed to Canada on a construction tour. A design was agreed for a new bridge (of 207 foot span) on the Petawawa training area. 9 Parachute Squadron constructed the abutments and began the pier. The spans were later completed by 51 Field Squadron (Construction).

=== Belize, 1979 ===
From 25 January to 16 July the squadron conducted a construction tour in southern Belize.

=== Zimbabwe, 1979–1980 ===
Two members of 9 Parachute Squadron took part in the Commonwealth Cease Fire Monitoring Force (Operation Agila) in Rhodesia, during its transition into the independent state of Zimbabwe. The deployment lasted from December 1979 to March 1980.

=== Northern Ireland, 1980–1981 ===
The squadron deployed for a seventh time on Operation Banner to Castledillon, Armagh from 23 October 1980 to 8 March 1981.

=== Falklands War, 1982 ===
In April 1982, the squadron embarked for the Falkland Islands as part of 5 Infantry Brigade on Operation Corporate. In true sapper tradition, the squadron was involved in the thick of the action from clearing minefields to repairing bridges. They suffered casualties of four killed and twelve wounded. Sergeant Ron Wrega, Sergeant Pete Colclough and Corporal John Foran won the Military Medal during the conflict.

=== Royal Guard, 1987 ===
After the Falklands War, the squadron had tours in Belize, Kenya, the Falklands and Canada. In 1987, in the Royal Engineers 200th Anniversary Year, the squadron was selected to provide the Royal Guard. After six weeks of intense training, the squadron provided the guard for Buckingham Palace, St. James's Palace and for the Tower of London. They were also given the duty of guarding the Royal London Palaces in 2009, 21 years after first performing the task.

=== West Sussex flooding, 1993–1994 ===
In response to the West Sussex floods from December to January, 9 Parachute Squadron provided four Bailey bridges in Chichester in order to reopen routes.

=== Rwanda, 1994 ===
Between July and November 1994, the squadron served in Rwanda as part of the UNAMIR mission, for which it was jointly awarded the Wilkinson Sword of Peace. In Rwanda, the squadron contributed to the stabilising of the difficult situation and to the rebuilding of the country's infrastructure. This was achieved by providing sterilised water, constructing roads and bridges (including the longest operationally constructed Bailey Bridge since the Second World War), providing support to medical and dental facilities, general artisan trade work and mine clearance.

=== Northern Ireland, 1995 - 1996 ===
Between September 1995 and March 1996, the squadron deployed on its eighth tour to Northern Ireland. The squadron provided a High Risk Search Troop and carried out a number of tasks associated with the (then) recent 1994 ceasefire, notably the removal of a number of border Permanent Vehicle Check Points.

=== The Balkans, 1998–1999 ===
In September 1998 the squadron was deployed to Bosnia, being involved in repairing, reinforcing and replacing camp structures. In June 1999, 100 soldiers from the squadron were deployed to Kosovo, where they were involved in the clearing and securing of the mountain corridor to Kaçanik to enable 4 Brigade to pass through. In addition, members of the squadron deployed on a UN mission to Cyprus.

== 21st century, 2000 – present day ==
=== Northern Ireland, 2000 ===
Between May – September 2000, the squadron deployed on a ninth tour to Northern Ireland, carrying out various tasks across the province including dismantling the famous golf towers of South Armagh. Operation Banner was concluded in 2007.

=== Macedonia insurgency, 2001 ===
In August 2001, the squadron deployed to the Republic of Macedonia on Operation Bessemer (the UK contribution to Operation Essential Harvest). The main squadron task was in support of the weapons collection operation. Members of the squadron also provided the vital infrastructure required to sustain such an operation, as well as constructing extensive force protection measures. During the operation, Recce Troop, on their debut deployment, carried out vital route reconnaissance and with the assistance of geo technicians, produced mapping of routes throughout the country. on the 27 August, Sapper Ian Collins was killed when a concrete block thrown at his vehicle struck him on the head. The squadron returned to the UK on the 12 October.

=== Operation Fingal, 2001–2002 ===
Having recently returned from Macedonia, December 2001 saw a rapid deployment to Afghanistan for the initial phases of the war on terror following the September 11 attacks. The squadron had an integral part to play in the International Security Assistance Force on Operation Fingal. The squadron, based out of Kabul, provided vital infrastructure and force protection in support of 2 PARA Battlegroup, as part of the Multi National Engineer Group.

=== Resubordination, 2003 ===
23 Engineer Regiment (Air Assault) (now known as 23 Parachute Engineer Regiment) reformed on 6 January 2003 and took command of the squadron from 36 Engineer Regiment. In July 2006 the squadron moved from Aldershot Garrison to be based with its new Regiment at Rock Barracks.

=== Iraq War, 2003 ===
The squadron deployed to the Iraq War in 2003 under Operation Telic.

=== Operation Herrick IV, 2006 ===
3 Troop deployed to Afghanistan under 51 Parachute Squadron RE from April to September, in support of 16 Air Assault Brigade.

=== Operation Herrick VIII, 2008 ===
The squadron deployed alongside the rest of 23 Engineer Regiment (Air Assault) from May – October 2008.

=== Operation Branta, 2016 ===
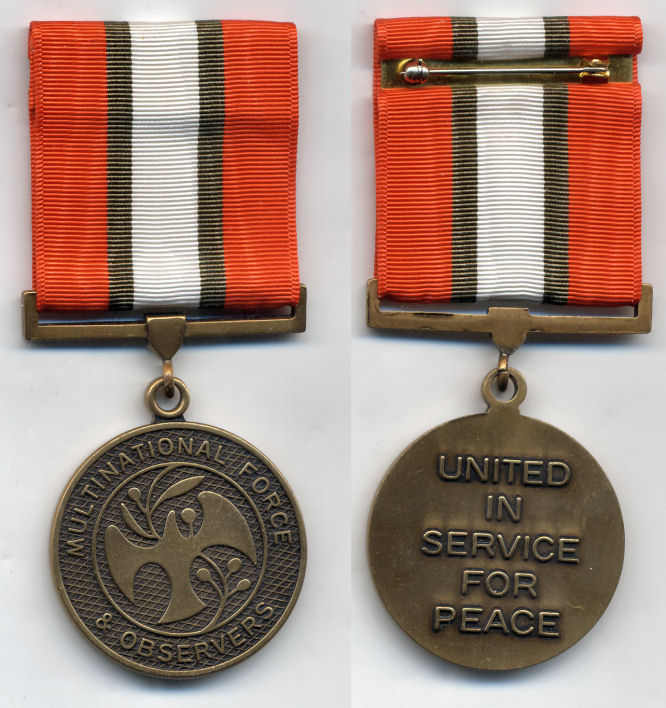
MFO Medal.

The squadron deployed to the Egyptian Sinai from February to April 2016 under Operation Branta in support of the Multinational Force and Observers. During the operation they improved the force protection infrastructure of the camp, including the construction of 16km of defensive walls.

=== Royal Guard, 2023 ===
In 2023, 9 Parachute Squadron was chosen as the central unit from 23 Parachute Engineer Regiment to be the King's Guard. They provided guard at Buckingham Palace, the Tower of London, St James's Palace, and Windsor Castle from late January to May. One officer on parade became a viral phenomenon, being dubbed "Prince Charming" by many on social media after he was described saying "good-morning" in an attractive manner to the onlooking crowd.

== Other activities ==
In 2011, the squadron returned home with the rest of 23 Parachute Engineer Regiment from its last tour of Afghanistan. The tasks of 12 (Nova Scotia) Headquarters and Support (Air Assault) Squadron were split across the remaining two Parachute Field Squadrons in the Regiment as it was placed in suspended animation until 2018 when it was reformed as 12 Parachute Headquarters and Support Squadron.

== Organisation ==
=== 1985 ===
In 1985, the 9 Parachute Squadron RE is documented to be organised as such:

- Sqn HQ
  - HQ Tp
  - 1 TP
  - 2 Tp
  - 3 Tp
  - Sp Tp
    - MT
    - Plant
    - REME Sect

=== 1787 ===
In 1787, the Field Company is documented to have an establishment as such, under command of officers of the Corps of Royal Engineers:

- 1xSergeant-major
- 3xSergeants
- 4xCorporals
- 2xDrummers

Privates:

- 12xCarpenters
- 10xMasons
- 10xBricklayers
- 5xSmiths
- 5xWheelers
- 4xSawyers
- 8xMiners
- 2xPainters
- 2xCoopers
- 2xCollar-makers.
- 30xLabourers

== Notable personnel ==
=== Officers Commanding ===
Officers commanding the squadron have included:

- 1783–1785: Capt. R. Pringle
- 1806: Capt. H. Evatt
- 1813: Maj. W. Tylden
- 1821–1823: Capt. A. Marshall
- 1823–1824: Lt. G. Lewis
- 1824–1826: Maj. G. J. Harding
- 1826–1828: Lt. G. C. D. Lewis
- 1828–1832: Capt. G. V. Tinling
- 1832: Lt. T. L. Lewis
- 1832: Capt. H. Sandham
- 1837: Capt. W. Faris
- 1842: Lt. Stanley
- 1842: Maj. E. Aldrich
- 1851: Capt. R. Tylden
- 1852: Capt. Hampden Clement Blamire Moody
- 1853: Capt. W. H. Jesse
- 1854: Capt. J. F. M. Browne
- 1855: Capt. C. H. Sedley
- 1856: Lt. J. B. Edwards
- 1856: Capt. W. F. Lambert
- 1856: Capt. C. Rice
- 1859: Capt. J. P. Cox
- 1862: Capt. R. Decle
- 1865: Capt. R. B. Rimington
- 1870: Capt. E. N. Peters
- 1879: Capt. J. S. Nicholson
- 1914: Maj. J. B. Barstow (K.I.A. 31 August 1914)
- 1914: Capt. G. F. Evans (Acting due to death of Comd)
- 1914–1915: Maj. D. M. Hoysted
- 1915–1916: Capt. G. Le Q. Martel
- 1916–1918: Capt. E. E. Homer
- 1924–1925: Maj. A. B. Clough M.C.
- 1925–1926: Maj. W. E. Euler M.C.
- 1926–1928: Maj. A. T. Shakespear D.S.O. M.C.
- 1928–1930: Maj. MacGeorge
- 1937–1939: Maj. J. D. Newman
- 1939–1941: Maj. F. W. Houghton M.C.
- 1941–1942: Maj. H. G. N. White
- 1942: Maj. E. F. Kyte
- 1942–1943: Maj. B. S. Beazley (K.I.A. 10 July 1943)
- 1943–1944: Maj. R. A. McNeile
- 1944–1945: Maj. J. C. Winchester
- 1948–1950: Maj. D. A. Smith
- 1950–1951: Maj. P. M. Bennett
- 1951–1953: Maj. I. H. Lyall Grant M.C.
- 1953–1955: Maj. A. J. I. Poynder M.C.
- 1955–1957: Maj. C. E. H. Edwards M.C.
- 1957–1959: Maj. R. F. Semple M.C.
- 1959–1960: Maj. R. M. Merrell M.B.E.
- 1960–1962: Maj. I. T. C. Wilson M.B.E. M.C.
- 1962–1965: Maj. C. L. B. Gillespie
- 1965–1967: Maj. M. Mathews
- 1967–1969: Maj. P. J. Dickison
- 1969–1970: Maj. S. L. Rooth M.B.E.
- 1970–1972: Maj. J. B. Awford
- 1972–1974: Maj. W. M. R. Addison
- 1974–1976: Maj. M. J. Payne
- 1976–1978: Maj. H. G. R. Taggart
- 1978–1979: Maj. T. J. W. Robertson
- 1979–1982: Maj. I. D. T. McGill
- 1982–1984: Maj. C. M. Davies M.B.E.
- 1984–1985: Maj. C. N. Guthkelch
- 1985–1987: Maj. C. W. Crawford M.B.E.
- 1987–1990: Maj. D. R. Burns
- 1990–1992: Maj. P. Wall
- 1992 - 1993 Maj J Mullin
- 1993 - 1995 Maj I S James MBE
- 1995–1997: Maj. D. Hudson M.B.E.
- 2002–2004: Maj. P. Fountaine
- 2006–2008: Maj. F. Ross
- 2008–2010: Maj. J. Fossey
- 2010–2012: Maj. J. Clark
- 2014–2016: Maj. D. Stead
- 2016–2018: Maj. J. Crossley
- 2018–2020: Maj. J. Viney
- 2020–2022: Maj. R. Sharrock
- 2022–2024: Maj. P. Dobinson M.B.E.
- 2024–present: Maj. C. J. Swanwick

=== Others ===
- Basil Beazley: International rowing athlete.
- Henry Evatt: Senior Royal Engineer Officer.
- Giffard Le Quesne Martel: Pioneering British military engineer, tank strategist and boxing champion.
- Steven John "Legs" Lane: UK Special Forces soldier killed on Bravo Two Zero and former LCpl in 9 Sqn.
- Ant Middleton: British adventurer, television personality and former UK Special Forces soldier.
- Fergie Semple: Former Director SAS.
- Peter Wall: Former Chief of the General Staff.

== Bibliography ==
- 9th Field Company Royal Engineers War Diary. Vol. August 1914 to February 1919 WO 95/1469/2. London: MOD & National Archives. 1919.
- Brown, Steve (August 2014). "British Artillery Battalions and the Men Who Led Them 1793–1815" (PDF). The Napoleon Series.
- Chant, Christopher (1986). The Encyclopaedia of Codenames of World War II. London: Routledge. ISBN 0-7102-0718-2.
- Cole, Howard N (1963). On Wings of Healing: the Story of the Airborne Medical Services 1940–1960. Edinburgh: William Blackwood. OCLC 29847628.
- Connolly, T. W. J. (1857). History of the Royal Sappers and Miners. Vol. 1: From the Formation of the Corps in March 1712 to the date when its designation was changed to that of Royal Engineers. London: Longman, Brown, Green, Longmans, and Roberts.
- Cooper, Michael D. (2006). A Short History of the Corps of Royal Engineers. Brompton Barracks, Chatham, Kent: The Institution of Royal Engineers. ISBN 0-903530-28-7.
- Edwards, R. F. (1898). Roll of Officers Of the Corps of Royal Engineers from 1660 to 1898 (PDF). Chatham, Kent: The Institution of Royal Engineers.
- Gander, T. J. (1985). The Royal Engineers. Shepperton, Surrey: Ian Allan Ltd. ISBN 0-7110-1517-1.
- Hughes, Quentin; Migos, Athanassios (1995). Strong as the Rock of Gibraltar. Gibraltar: Exchange Publications. OCLC 48491998.
- Joslen, H. F. (2003). Orders of Battle, United Kingdom and Colonial Formations and Units in the Second World War, 1939–1945. Uckfield: Naval & Military Press. ISBN 1-843424-74-6.
- Mackintosh, H. W. B. (1993). History of the Corps of Royal Engineers (PDF). Vol. XI: 1960-1980: The Years of Contraction - Withdrawal, Reduction and Reorganization. Chatham, Kent: Institution of Royal Engineers. ISBN 0-903530-22-8.
- Martel, Giffard Le Q. (December 1914). "R.E. Work at the Front" (PDF). The Royal Engineers Journal. 20: 345–348.
- Maurice, Frederick (1906). History of the War in South Africa 1899–1902. Vol. I. London: Hurst and Blackett Limited. OCLC 775290050.
- McNab, A (2009). Spoken from the front. London, UK: Transworld Publishers. ISBN 9780593064795.
- Middleton, Ant (2018). First Man In. London: Harper Collins. ISBN 9780008245719.
- Packen-Walsh, R. P. (1958). History of the Corps of Royal Engineers. Vol. IX: 1938-1948: Campaigns in Sicily and Italy, The War against Japan, North-West Europe 1944-45, Minor and Non-Operational Areas, Post War 1945-48. Chatham, Kent: Institution of Royal Engineers.
- Porter, Whitworth (1889). History of the Corps of Royal Engineers. Vol. I. Chatham: The Institution of Royal Engineers. OCLC 499527195.
- Porter, Whitworth (1889). History of the Corps of Royal Engineers. Vol. II. Chatham: The Institution of Royal Engineers. OCLC 499527195.
- Pritchard Vol V, H. L. (1952). History of the Corps of Royal Engineers (PDF). Vol. V:The Home Front, France, Flanders and Italy in the First World War. Chatham: The Institution of Royal Engineers.
- Purves, Thomas (1988). The '9th', 1787–1960: The History of the British Army's Only Remaining Parachute Royal Engineer Squadron. Nottingham: Sherwood Press. ISBN 0-951349-40-6.
- Rinaldi, Richard. "Royal Engineers, World War I" (PDF). Orbat.com. Archived from the original (PDF) on 24 January 2014.
- Waddy, John (1999). A Tour of the Arnhem Battlefields. Barnsley: Pen & Sword Books Limited. ISBN 0850525713.
- Young, B. K. (December 1933). "The Diary of an R.E. Subaltern with the B.E.F. in 1914" (PDF). The Royal Engineers Journal. 47: 549–571.
- Young, B. K. (March 1934). "The Diary of an R.E. Subaltern with the B.E.F. in 1914 (contd.)" (PDF). The Royal Engineers Journal. 48: 1–19.
