= Battle of Taranto (disambiguation) =

The Battle of Taranto was a World War II battle in 1940.

Battle of Taranto may also refer to one of the battles between the Carthaginians and the Roman Republic:

- Battle of Tarentum (212 BC)
- Battle of Tarentum (209 BC)

== See also ==
- Battle of Tauroento (49 BC), between Caesarian and Pompeian forces near modern Marseille during the Roman Civil War
