= Evatt (disambiguation) =

Evatt may refer to:

- The English surname Evatt
- Clive Evatt (1900–1984), Australian politician and lawyer
- Elizabeth Evatt (born 1933), Australian lawyer and jurist
- George Evatt (1843–1921), British general
- H. Parker Evatt (born 1935), American politician
- H. V. Evatt (1894–1965), Australian politician and judge
- Henry Evatt (1768–1851), British officer in the Royal Engineers
- Ian Evatt (born 1981), English footballer
- Mary Alice Evatt (1898–1973), Australian artist, art patron, arts advocate and political activist
- Phillip Evatt (1922–2010), Australian naval officer and jurist
- Richard Evatt (1973–2012), British boxer
- Evatt, Australian Capital Territory, suburb of Canberra, Australia
