= HMS Boyne (1790) =

Ship of the line of the Royal Navy

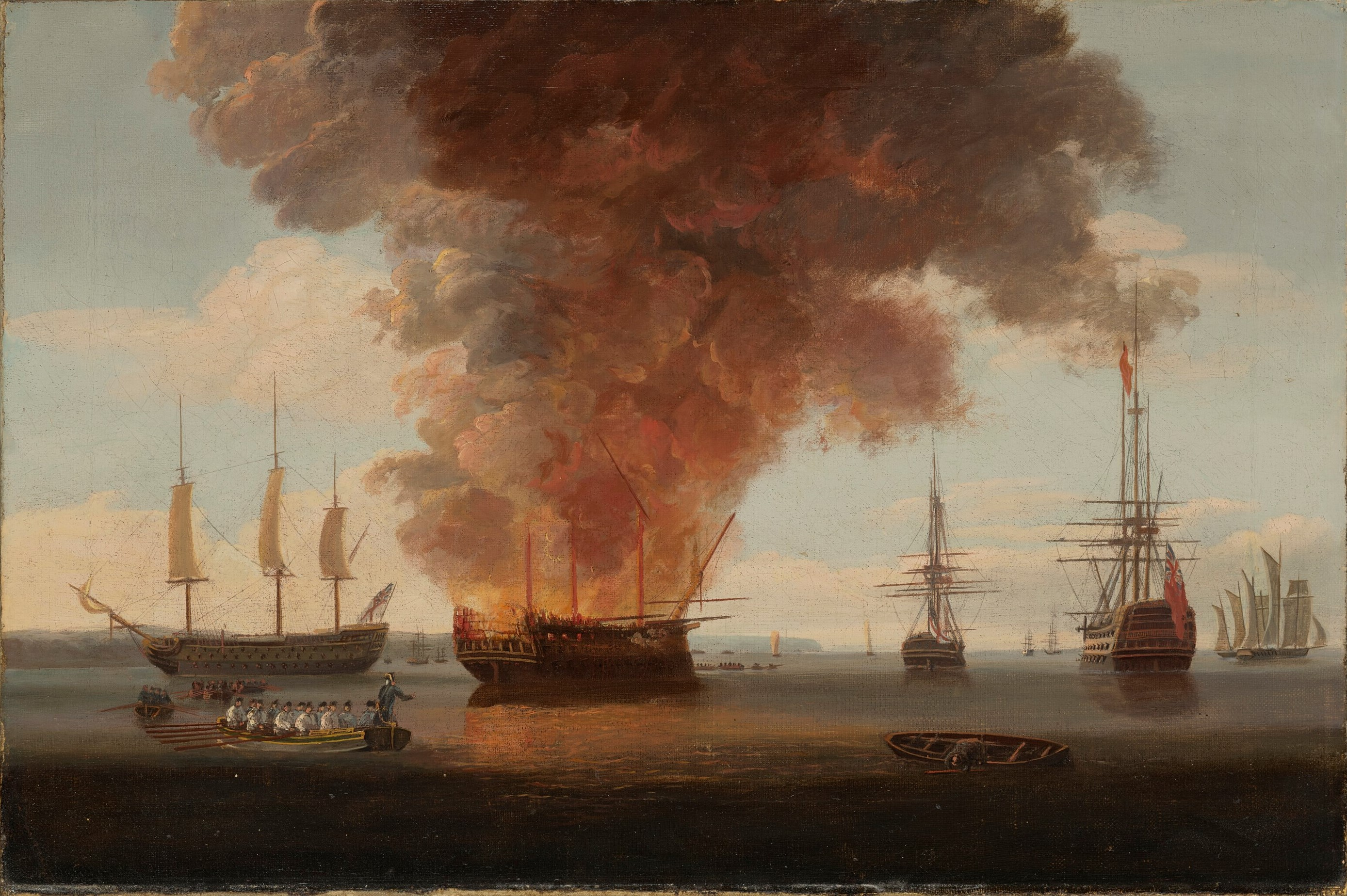
- The burning of HMS Boyne at Spithead, 1st May 1795, Unknown artist

History

Great Britain
- Name: HMS Boyne
- Ordered: 21 January 1783
- Builder: Woolwich Dockyard
- Laid down: 4 November 1783
- Launched: 27 July 1790
- Commissioned: August 1790
- Fate: Accidentally burnt, 1 May 1795

General characteristics
- Class & type: Boyne-class ship of the line
- Tons burthen: 2,021 (bm)
- Length: 182 ft (55 m) (gundeck); 149 ft 8 in (45.62 m) (keel)
- Beam: 50 ft 4 5/8 in (15.357 m)
- Depth of hold: 21 ft 9 in (6.63 m)
- Sail plan: Full-rigged ship
- Armament: Gundeck: 28 × 32-pounder guns; Middle gundeck: 30 × 18-pounder guns; Upper gundeck: 30 × 12-pounder guns; QD: 8 × 12-pounder guns; Fc: 2 × 12-pounder guns

HMS Boyne was a 98-gun second-rate ship of the line of the Royal Navy launched on 27 July 1790 at Woolwich Dockyard. She was the flagship of Vice Admiral John Jervis in 1794. She caught fire and blew up in 1795.

== Invasion of Guadeloupe ==
In 1793, Boyne set sail on 24 November for the West Indies, carrying Lieutenant-general Sir Charles Grey and Vice-admiral Sir John Jervis for an invasion of Guadeloupe. On the way, yellow fever ravaged the crew. Still, the British managed to get the French to surrender at Fort St. Charles in Guadeloupe on 21 April of the following year. The capture of Fort St. Charles, the batteries, and the town of Basse-Terre cost the British army two men killed, four wounded, and five missing; the navy had no casualties.

== Fate ==
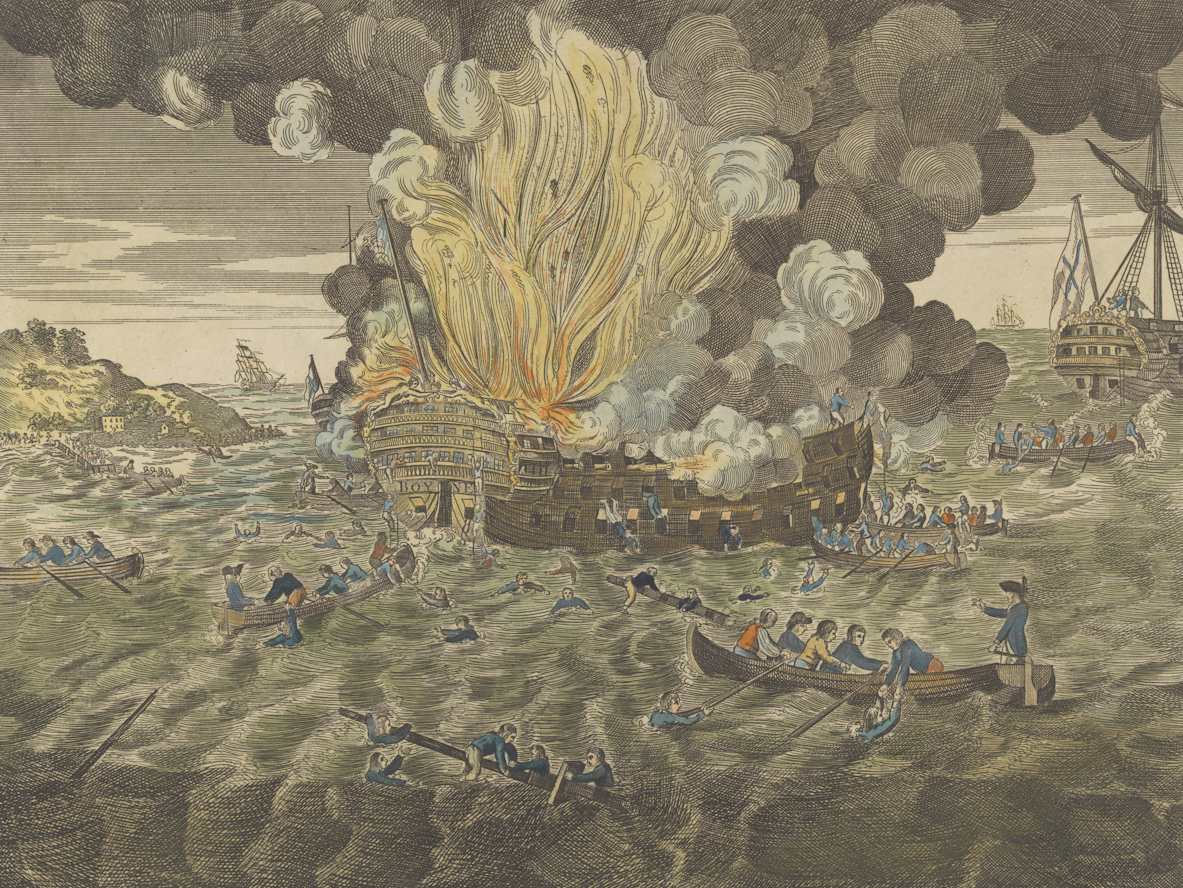
Illustration of Boyne on fire as her crew is rescue

Boyne caught fire and blew up on 1 May 1795 at Spithead. She was lying at anchor while the marines of the vessel were practising firing exercises. It is supposed that the funnel of the wardroom stove, which passed through the decks, set fire to papers in the Admiral's cabin. The fire was only discovered when flames burst through the poop, by which time it was too late to do anything. The fire spread rapidly and she was aflame from one end to the other within half an hour.

As soon as the fleet noticed the fire, other vessels sent boats to render assistance. As a result, the death toll on Boyne was only eleven men. At the same time, the signal was made for the vessels most at danger from the fire to get under way. Although the tide and wind were not favourable, all the vessels in any danger were able to escape to St Helens.

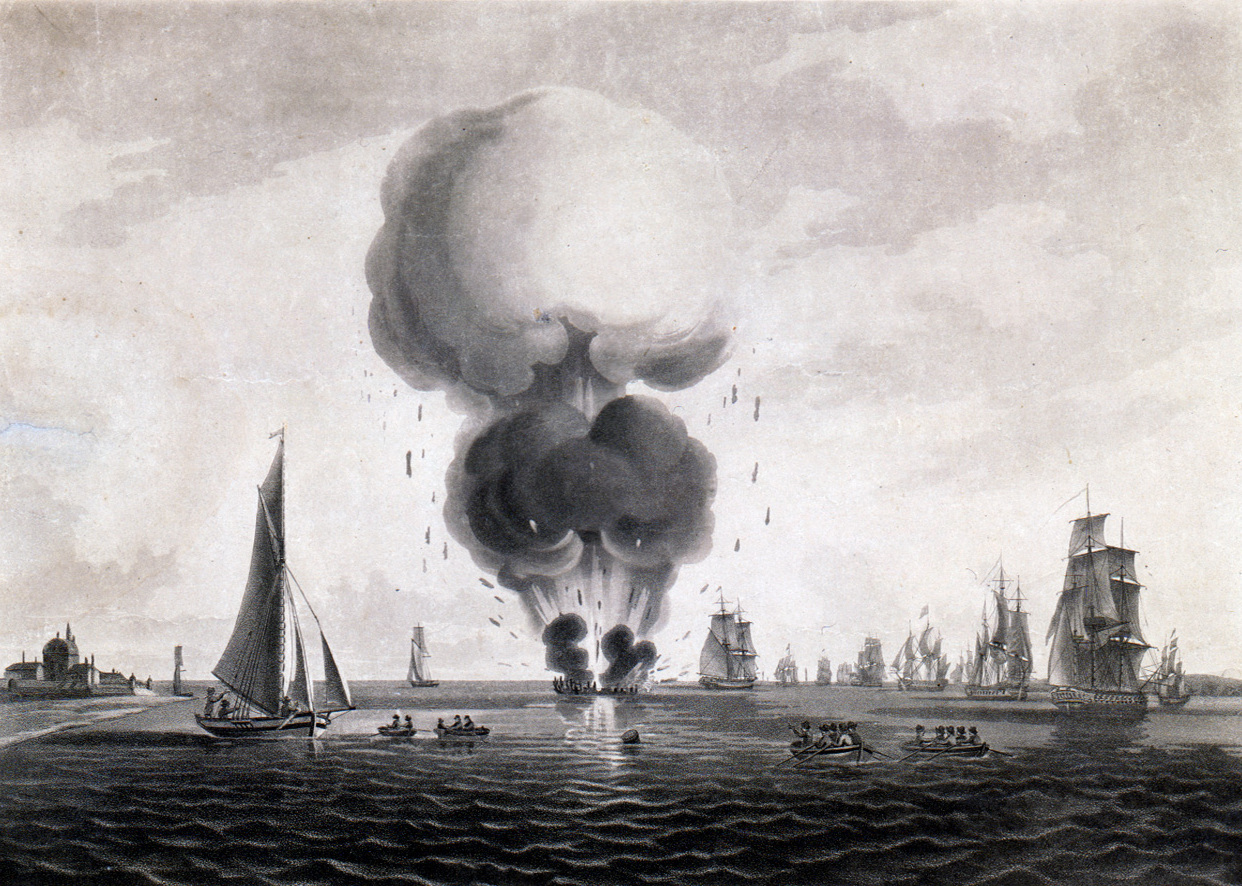
Illustration of Boyne exploding off Southsea by Captain T. M. Waller

Because the guns were always left loaded, the cannons began to 'cook off', firing shots at potential rescuers making their way to the ship, resulting in the deaths of two seamen and the injury of another aboard Queen Charlotte, anchored nearby. Later in the day, the fire burnt the cables and Boyne drifted eastward till she grounded on the east end of the Spit, opposite Southsea Castle. There she blew up soon after.

== Post-script ==
The wreck presented something of a hazard to a navigation and as a result it was blown up on 30 August 1838 in a clearance attempt, and yet again a final attempt on 24 June 1840.

Today the Boyne buoy marks the site of the explosion. A few metal artefacts from the ship remain atop a mound of shingle.
