= Port of Taranto =

Port in Italy

Coordinates: 40°28′48″N 17°13′12″E

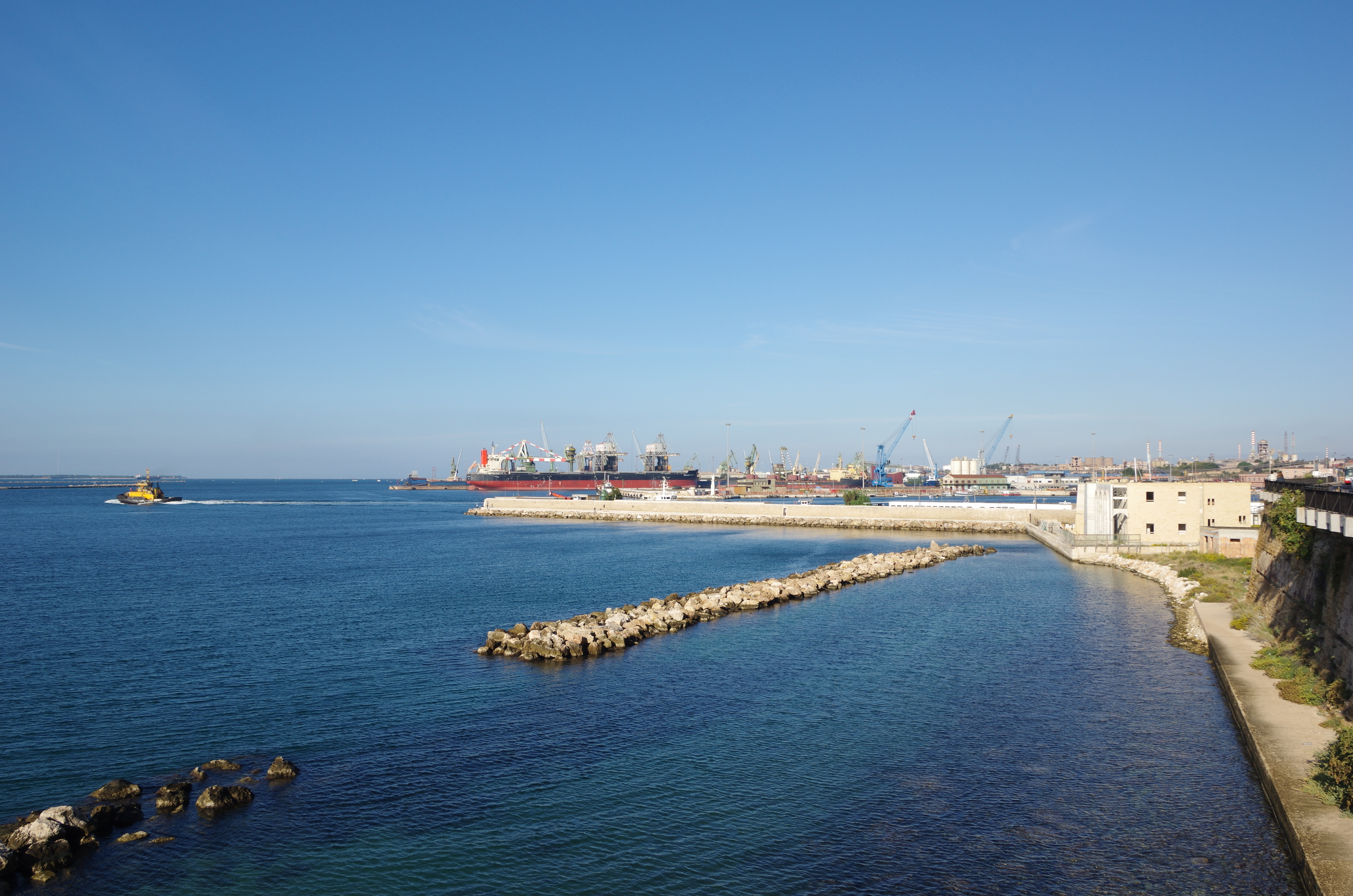
- Click on the map for a fullscreen view

The Port of Taranto (Italian: Porto di Taranto) is a port serving Taranto, southeastern Italy. One of the first in Italy for goods traffic, it is located on the northern coast of the gulf and plays an important role commercially and strategically. It has three entrances, two of which are operational. Its management is entrusted to the Port Authority, which is based within the port. Since 2011 the container terminal has been run by the Taranto Container Terminal SpA, which is 60% owned by Hutchison Whampoa and 40% owned by Evergreen Marine Corporation.

== History ==
=== Roman times ===
During the Second Punic War Taranto (then called Tarentum) was first captured by the Carthaginians during the Battle of Tarentum (212 BC) and then recaptured by the Romans in the Battle of Tarentum (209 BC).

=== World War II ===
During World War II, there were two important military operation in Taranto, the Battle of Taranto in 1940 and Operation Slapstick in 1943.
