= Michael Gray =

Michael Gray may refer to:

== Sportspeople ==
- Mike Gray (Canadian football) (born 1960), Canadian Football League player
- Michael Gray (footballer) (born 1974), English footballer

== Others ==
- Michael Gray (DJ) (born 1966), British DJ and house music producer
- Michael Gray (actor) (1951–2026), American actor
- Michael Gray (author) (born 1946), author of books on popular music, in particular Bob Dylan
- Michael Gray (British Army officer) (1932–2011)
- Michael Gray (game designer), American game designer
- Michael John Gray (born 1976), Arkansas politician
- Michael R. Gray (1941–2023), Australian arachnologist
- Mike Gray (1935–2013), American screenwriter
- Mike Wingate Gray (1921–1995), British Army officer
- Michael Gray (character) in Peaky Blinders

== See also ==
- Michael Joaquin Grey (born 1961), American artist, inventor, and toy designer
