= Basil Beazley =

Male rower who competed for England

Personal information
- Nationality: British (English)
- Born: 29 October 1913 Oxford, England
- Died: 10 July 1943 (aged 29)

Sport
- Sport: Rowing
- Club: London Rowing Club
Medal record
Rowing
Representing England
British Empire Games
Gold medal – first place	1938 Sydney	Eights

Basil Saunders Beazley (29 October 1913 – 10 July 1943) was a male rower who competed for England.

== Rowing career ==
Beazley represented England and won a gold medal in the eight at the 1938 British Empire Games in Sydney, Australia. He rowed for the London Rowing Club.

== Personal life ==
He was an electrical engineer by trade and lived in Newport Road, Cardiff during 1938. He was killed during World War II, in 1943 when serving as a Major with the Royal Engineers and is buried at the Syracuse War Cemetery in Sicily.

== Death ==
9 Field Company RE (Airborne) took part in the glider landing operation (Operation Ladbroke) to facilitate the Allied Invasion of Sicily on Operation Husky. As part of the 1st Airlanding Brigade, 9 Field Company RE (Airborne) were some of the first troops to arrive after departing from Malta at 6pm on 9 July. Due to high winds, misjudgement from pilots and friendly fire from allied ships, the majority of the gliders landed in the sea. One successful glider containing sappers of 9 Field Company under command of Maj Basil Saunders Beazley landed in a tomato plantation near Ponte Grande. They fought through to the bridge under enemy fire. The bridge was captured at 5am, the demolition charges drawn, and the area held, in spite of counterattacks by the Italians. The embattled sappers held out until the arrival of 5th Division on 10 July. Of the total strength of 8 officers and 65 men, only 19 survived. Maj Basil Saunders Beazley was killed in action on the afternoon of 10 July.
