= Henry Evatt =

British Army Officer

Lieutenant-General Henry Evatt
- Born: c.1768
- Died: 27 January 1851 (aged 82–83); Kent
- Military career
- Allegiance: United Kingdom
- Branch: Royal Engineers
- Service years: 1793–1825
- Rank: Lieutenant-General

Lieutenant-General Henry Evatt (1768 – 27 January 1851) was an officer in the Royal Engineers.

== Biography ==
=== Military service ===
Evatt commissioned into the Corps of Royal Engineers in 1793. He took part in the Invasion of Guadeloupe (1794) as a lieutenant, notably defending Fort Matilda from the 14 October until being evacuated on 10 December.

He served in Dominica in 1795 and Puerto Rico in 1797. He was wounded fighting on the Helder Expedition in 1799.

The garrison in Gibraltar had suffered heavy losses from a fever in 1804, so on 31st December 1805 (as a Captain) he embarked on a voyage with 133 artificers from the UK to reinforce the Garrison. He took command of 9th (Gibraltar) Company Royal Military Artificers in February 1806.

He promoted to Lieutenant Colonel on 24 June 1809.

In 1810 he oversaw the works at Forts Barbara and St. Felipe, on the Spanish lines in front of Gibraltar, to demolish them by a strong detachment from the two Gibraltar artificer companies. The operations occupied a few months; and during the work the detachment was covered by a force from the garrison of 500 to 800 soldiers.

He was the Commander Royal Engineers in Cueta 1810-1814 and Ceylon in 1815. He promoted to Colonel Commandant in 1832.

He promoted to the brevet rank of Major General on 27 May 1825 and was brevetted Lieutenant General on 3 July 1838.
