= John Simpson (British Army officer) =

British Army officer (1927–2007)

Brigadier John Simpson CBE
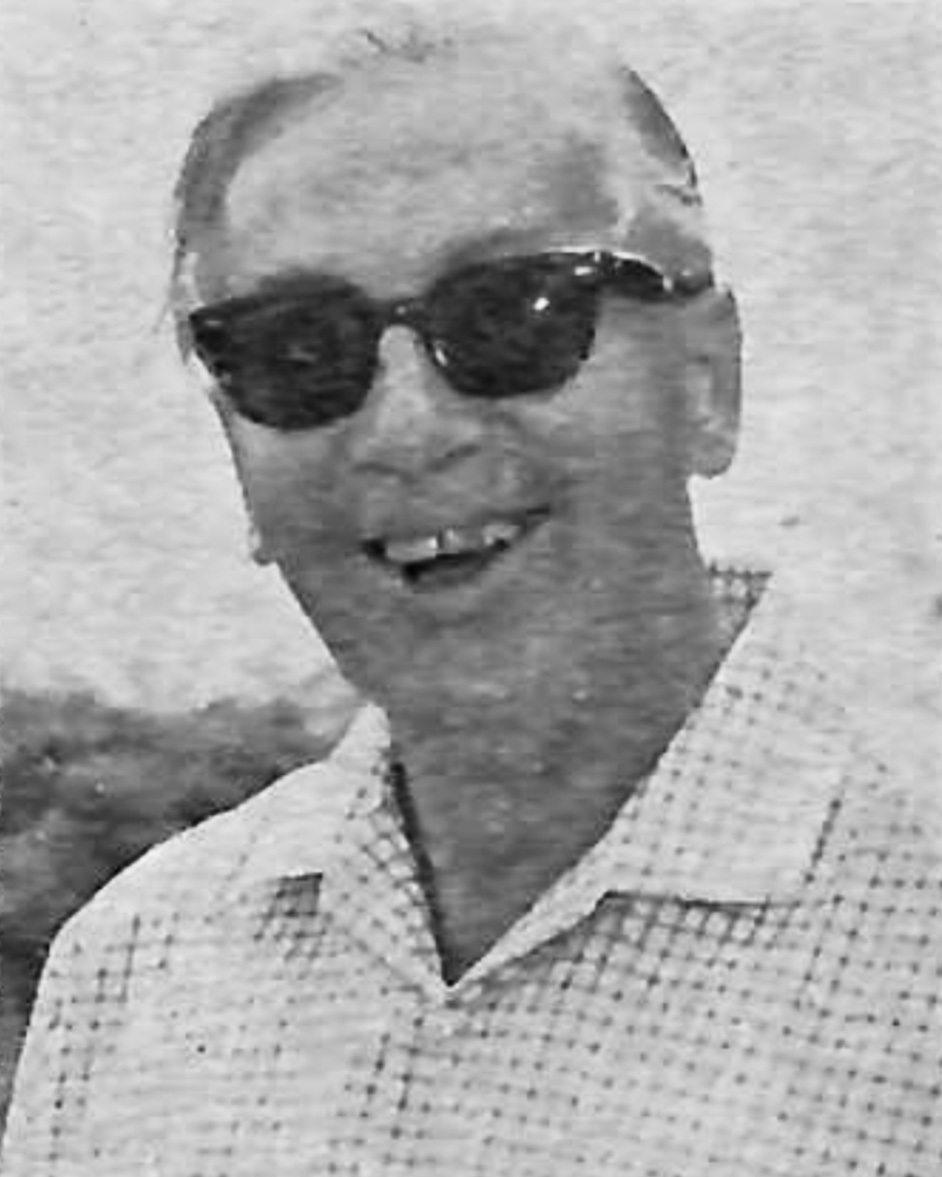
- Simpson in 1969
- Born: 10 October 1927; Trinidad
- Died: 7 March 2007 (aged 79); Sydney, New South Wales, Australia
- Military career
- Allegiance: United Kingdom
- Branch: British Army
- Service years: 1945–1979
- Rank: Brigadier
- Commands: Special Air Service; Royal Brunei Malay Regiment
- Conflicts: Malayan Emergency; Cyprus Emergency; Indonesia–Malaysia confrontation
- Awards: Commander of the Order of the British Empire; Order of Setia Negara Brunei, Second Class; Order of Pahlawan Negara Brunei, First Class

Signature
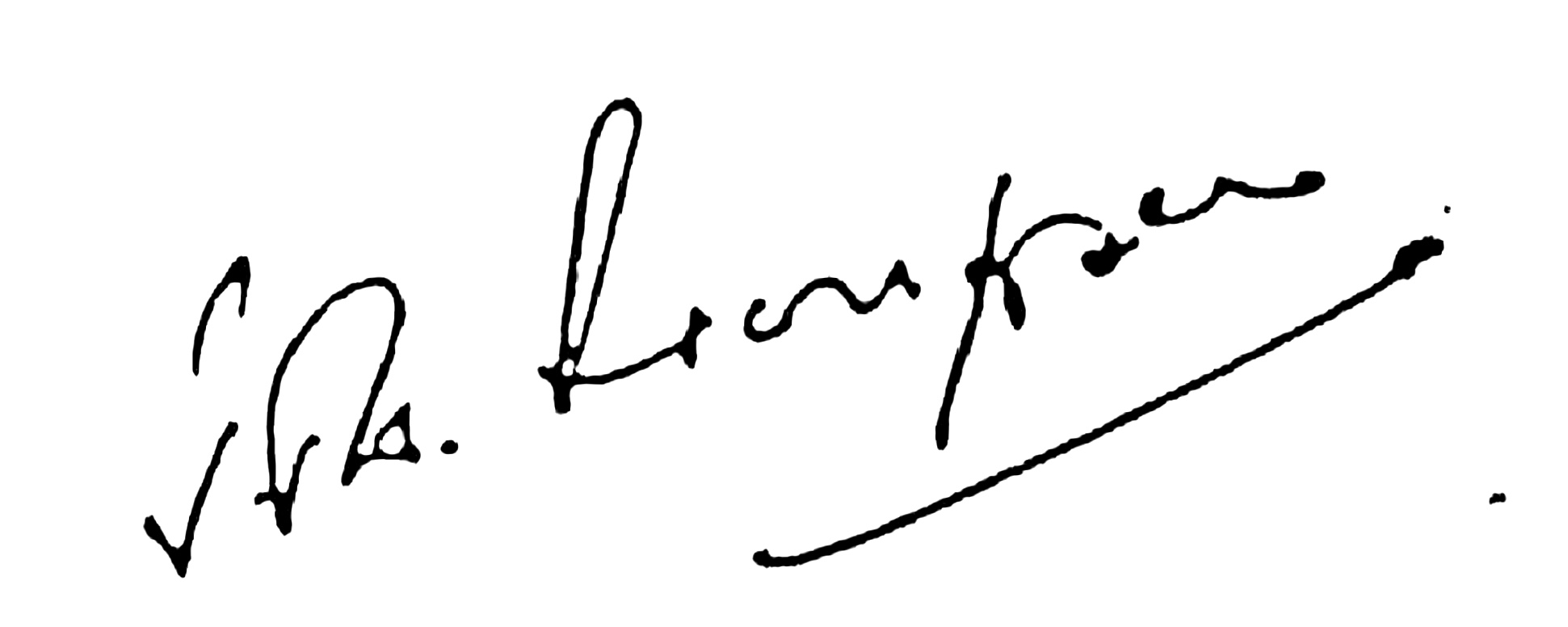

Brigadier John James Hope Simpson, CBE (10 October 1927 – 7 March 2007), also referred to as J. J. H. Simpson, was a British Army officer who served as Director SAS from 1972 to 1975. Notably, he received praise from the Sultan of Brunei for his efforts to bolster the nation's defense forces.

== Early life and education ==
The son of a South African-educated lawyer from a Scottish family that had ties to South Africa and India since the 1860s, John James Hope Simpson was born in Trinidad. Before enrolling at Queen's Royal College in Trinidad, he attended preparatory school in England.

== Military career ==
Simpson enlisted in the Coldstream Guards in May 1945 and was commissioned into the Gordon Highlanders in 1946. He served in Malaya during the Malayan Emergency in the early 1950s, in Cyprus during terrorist campaign EOKA in the late 1950s, and then commanded a small amphibious team in Borneo during the Indonesia–Malaysia confrontation in the early 1960s. He was appointed an instructor at the Staff College, Camberley, in 1965, commander of the Royal Brunei Armed Forces in 1969 and Director SAS in 1972. His last appointment was in 1975 as director of the team at the Defence Policy Staff who had responsibility for NATO and Europe before he retired in 1979.

Simpson succeeded Lieutenant Colonel H.F. Burrows as the commander of the Royal Brunei Malay Regiment (AMDB) on 1 May 1969. Upon launching of military exercise Harimau Timah, he coordinated the movement of soldiers of ADMB and Royal Brunei Police Force (RBPF) against the 2nd Royal Gurkha Rifles as the opposing force. The week-long exercise showcased their capability in breaking enemy lines in the jungles and rivers of Brunei. On 23 September 1970, the wife of Simpson officiated the KDB Masna ship launch ceremony at the Vosper Thornycroft shipyard in Tanjong Rhu, Singapore. On 4 December 1971, he was replaced by Colonel B.F.L. Rooney.

== Legacy ==
=== Things named after him ===
- Jalan Dato Simpson, a road in Berakas Camp

=== Honours ===
- Commander of the Order of the British Empire (CBE)
- Order of Pahlawan Negara Brunei First Class (PSPNB; 27 November 1971) – Dato Seri Pahlawan
- Order of Setia Negara Brunei Second Class (DSNB; 15 July 1970) – Dato Setia
- Order of Paduka Laila Jasa Keberanian Gemilang Third Class (DKG)

Military offices
Preceded by Fergie Semple	Director SAS; 1972–1975	Succeeded by John Watts
