= Fergie Semple =

Brigadier Fergie Semple MBE MC
- Born: 26 January 1922
- Died: 31 July 2003 (aged 81)
- Military career
- Allegiance: United Kingdom
- Branch: British Army
- Service years: 1942–1972
- Rank: Brigadier
- Commands: Special Air Service; 131 Parachute Engineer Regiment; 9 Independent Parachute Squadron (RE)
- Conflicts: Second World War
- Awards: Member of the Order of the British Empire; Military Cross

Brigadier Roderick Ferguson Semple, MBE, MC (26 January 1922 – 31 July 2003) was a British Army officer who served as Director SAS from 1969 to 1972.

== Military career ==
Educated at Aberdeen Grammar School and the University of Aberdeen, Semple was commissioned into the Royal Engineers in 1942. He served in the Second World War with the 6th Airborne Divisional Engineers creating Glider Landing Zones in the Airborne landings in Normandy in June 1944. He received the MC for this.

Semple commanded 9 Independent Parachute Squadron (RE) from 1957 to 1959. He went on to be chief of staff for 16 Parachute Brigade, before becoming commanding officer of 131 Parachute Engineer Regiment. He was appointed Director of the SAS in 1969 before retiring in 1972.

In retirement, Semple became Director-General of Administration in the Omani Department of Defence and a member of the Sultan's National Defence Council. The Airborne Engineers Association still holds an annual Fergie Semple Golf Competition in his honour.

== Family ==
Semple was married to Olivia; they had no children.

Military offices
Preceded by Mike Wingate Gray	Director SAS; 1969–1972	Succeeded by John Simpson
