= Order of Paduka Laila Jasa Keberanian Gemilang =

Awarded by the Sultan of Brunei
- Type: Military decoration
- Established: 1968
- Country: Brunei
- Awarded for: For acts of military gallantry
- Status: Currently constituted
- Sovereign: Hassanal Bolkiah
- Grades: Grand Commander (DPKG); Commander (DLKG); Companion (DKG)

Precedence
- Next (higher): Order of Islam Brunei
- Next (lower): Order of Paduka Keberanian Laila Terbilang
- (DPKG) (DLKG) (DKG)

The Most Illustrious Order of Paduka Laila Jasa Keberanian Gemilang (Malay: Darjah Paduka Laila Jasa Keberanian Gemilang Yang Amat Cemerlang), also translated as The Most Illustrious Order of Splendid Valour, is an order of Brunei. It was established on 1 August 1968 by Sultan Hassanal Bolkiah.

== Current classes ==
The three classes of appointment to the Order are, from highest grade to lowest grade:

Class	Post-nominal	Title	Ribbon bar
Grand Commander	DPKG	Dato Paduka Seri	
Commander	DLKG	Dato Laila	
Companion	DKG	–	

== Recipients ==
=== First Class ===
- Unknown – Omar Ali Saifuddien III – Sultan of Brunei
- Unknown – Hassanal Bolkiah – Sultan of Brunei

=== Third Class ===
- Unknown – John Simpson – Commander of the Royal Brunei Malay Regiment
- Unknown – B. F. L. Rooney – Commander of the Royal Brunei Malay Regiment
