= Mike Wingate Gray =

Brigadier Mike Wingate Gray OBE MC*
- Born: 17 July 1921
- Died: 3 November 1995 (aged 74)
- Military career
- Allegiance: United Kingdom
- Branch: British Army
- Service years: 1941–1973
- Rank: Brigadier
- Service number: 172279
- Unit: Black Watch
- Commands: Special Air Service; 22 Special Air Service Regiment
- Conflicts: Second World War; Indonesia–Malaysia confrontation Aden Emergency
- Awards: Officer of the Order of the British Empire; Military Cross & Bar

Brigadier Walter Michael Wingate Gray, OBE, MC & Bar (17 July 1921 – 3 November 1995) was a British Army officer who served as Colonel SAS from 1967 to 1969.

== Military career ==
Educated at Wellington College, Wingate Gray was commissioned into the Black Watch in February 1941 during the Second World War. After serving in North Africa, he took part in the Allied invasion of Sicily in July 1943 for which he was awarded the Military Cross (MC), and then the Normandy landings in 1944 for which he was awarded a Bar to his MC.

Wingate Gray was appointed commanding officer of 22 Special Air Service Regiment in 1964, and was deployed to Borneo during the Indonesia–Malaysia confrontation and then to Aden during the Aden Emergency before becoming Commander SAS Group as a colonel in 1967. Promoted to brigadier, he went on to be Deputy Commander, Gibraltar in 1969 and then military attaché in Paris in December 1971, before retiring in 1973.

Military offices
Preceded by John Waddy	Colonel SAS; 1967–1969	Succeeded by Fergie Semple
