= Director Special Forces =

Senior British Armed Forces officer

- Ministry of Defence; Special Forces
- Reports to: Chief of the Defence Staff
- Nominator: Secretary of State for Defence
- Appointer: The Monarch; On the advice of the Prime Minister, subject to formal approval by the King-in-Council
- Term length: Not fixed; typically 3–4 years

Director Special Forces (DSF) is the senior British Armed Forces officer responsible for the United Kingdom Special Forces. The post is a senior role within the Ministry of Defence (MoD). As director, the incumbent is responsible for the provision of special forces capability to MoD, and holds operational command for discrete special forces operations.

== History ==
The post of Colonel SAS (Special Air Service) was created in 1964; this post evolved into Director SAS with the post holder commanding the SAS corps from 1969.

In March 1987, the post of Director SAS became Director Special Forces; it consisted of the Army's Special Air Service, Royal Navy's Special Boat Service and the Army's 14 Intelligence Company under the command of the DSF, who held the rank of brigadier, and with a Deputy, who held the rank of colonel.

During the 2000s, the size of the directorate increased substantially with the inclusion of the Special Forces Support Group and the Joint Special Forces Aviation Wing. Other changes included the 14th Intelligence Company renamed as the Special Reconnaissance Regiment. This was to meet a demand for a special reconnaissance capability identified in the Strategic Defence Review: A New Chapter published in 2002 in response to the 2001 September 11 attacks. Following a review, it was found that the SAS Reserve lacked a clearly defined role, and also stated that the reservists lacked the capability, equipment, and skills to serve alongside the regular special forces. What followed was a reduction in the scope of UK Special Forces. As an outcome of this review, on 1 September 2014, 21 and 23 SAS were removed from the UKSF order of battle and placed with the Honourable Artillery Company (HAC), under the command of 1st Intelligence, Surveillance and Reconnaissance Brigade. This change was partly reversed in 2019 with 21 and 23 SAS returning as an integrated part of the UKSF group.

In 2008, the rank of the DSF was upgraded from brigadier to major-general with the directorate becoming an independent, operational-level component command, alongside Land, Navy and Air elements in the Permanent Joint Headquarters (PJHQ) and in the deployable Joint Force Headquarters (JFHQ).

The DSF is accountable to only the Defence Secretary and the Prime Minister. UKSF may operate in locations where the UK does not formally acknowledge a military presence.

== List of commanders ==
Commanders of special forces have been:

=== Colonel SAS ===
- 1964–1967 Colonel John Waddy (late Parachute Regiment)
- 1967–1969 Colonel Mike Wingate Gray (late Black Watch)

=== Director SAS ===
- 1969–1972 Brigadier Fergie Semple (late Royal Engineers)
- 1972–1975 Brigadier John Simpson (late Gordon Highlanders)
- 1975–1979 Brigadier John Watts (late Royal Ulster Rifles)
- 1979–1983 Brigadier Peter de la Billière (late Durham Light Infantry)
- 1983–1985 Brigadier John Foley (late Royal Green Jackets)

=== Director Special Forces ===
- 1986–1988 Brigadier Michael Wilkes (late Royal Artillery)
- 1988–1989 Brigadier Michael Rose (late Coldstream Guards)
- 1989–1993 Brigadier Jeremy Phipps (late Queen's Own Hussars)
- 1993–1996 Brigadier Cedric Delves (late Devonshire and Dorset Regiment)
- 1996–1999 Brigadier John Sutherell (late Royal Anglian Regiment)
- 1999–2001 Brigadier John Holmes (late Scots Guards)
- 2001–2003 Brigadier Graeme Lamb (late Queen's Own Highlanders)
- 2003–2006 Brigadier Jonathan Shaw (late Parachute Regiment)
- 2006–2009 Brigadier Adrian Bradshaw (late King's Royal Hussars)
- 2009–2012 Major General Jacko Page (late Parachute Regiment)
- 2012–2015 Major General Mark Carleton-Smith (late Irish Guards)
- 2015–2018 Major General James Chiswell (late Parachute Regiment)
- 2018–2021 Major General Roland Walker (late Grenadier Guards)
- 2021–2022 Major General Gwyn Jenkins Royal Marines
- 2022–2024 Major General Nick Perry (late King's Royal Hussars)
