= 1993–94 West Sussex floods =

Period of flooding in West Sussex, England from December 1993 to January 1994

- Date: 30 December 1993–January 1994
- Location: West Sussex, England

In December 1993 and January 1994, areas of West Sussex experienced flooding.

== Background ==
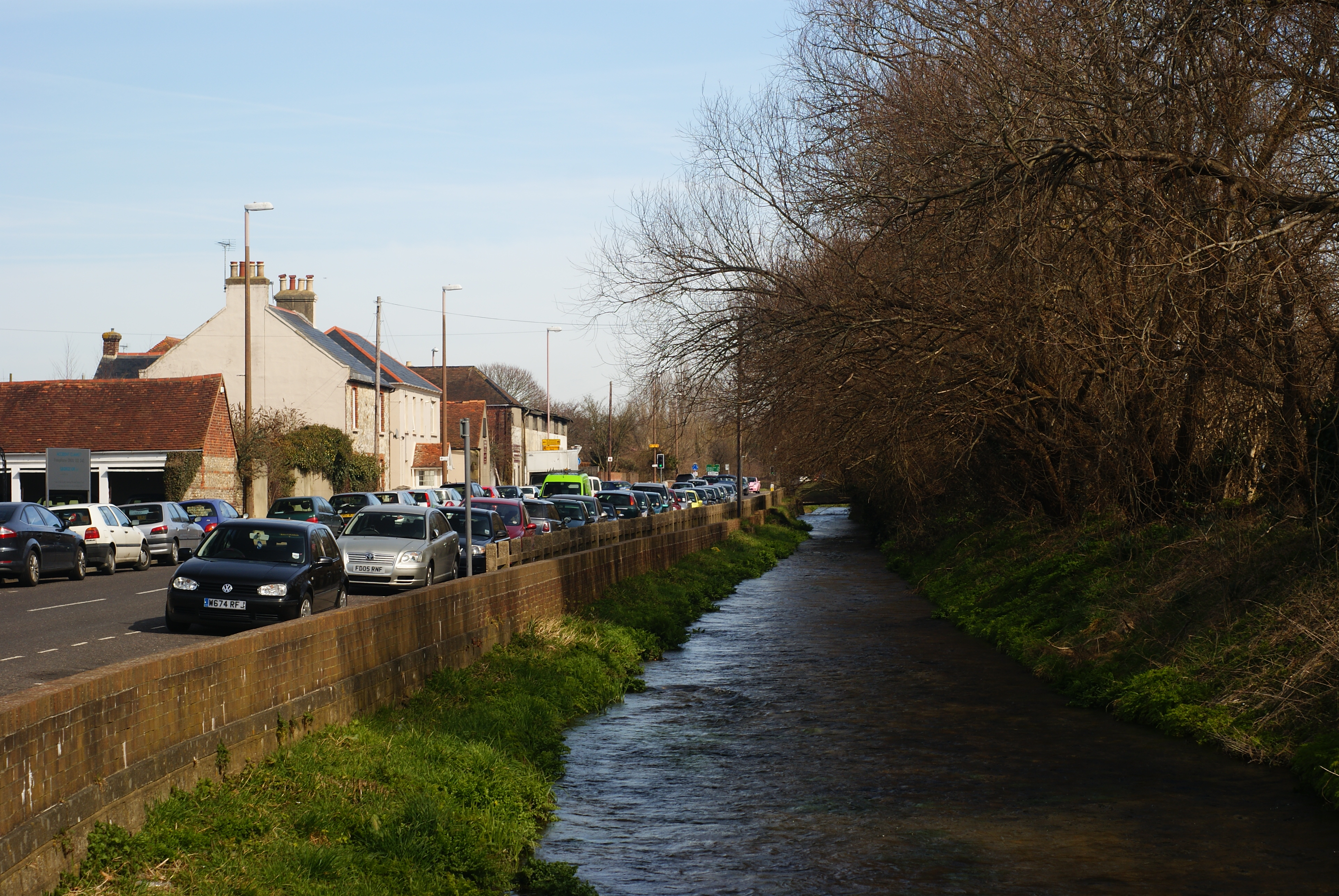
The River Lavant running through Chichester, West Sussex, in March 2010

From October 1993 to January 1994, there was a significant increase in rainfall in the River Lavant drainage basin, compared to the average. From 1961 to 1990, during the October to January period, rainfall in the basin averaged 379mm. In the same period from 1993 to 1994 the basin received 610mm of rainfall, an increase of 231mm or 61%.

== Floods ==
Areas of Bosham, Chichester, Fishbourne, Lavant, Singleton, and Wittering were affected.

West Sussex County Council distributed c. 2000 sandbags and the British Army distributed a further 50,000.

== Consequences ==
The flood damage cost West Sussex County Council £1.9 million. The flood was estimated to have caused £6 million of damage overall.

=== Reforms ===
A permanent system of flood reliefs were installed to prevent a repeat of the floods, at a cost of £4 million. In 2001, the River Lavant was diverted by the Environment Agency, extending the river by c. 6 miles (9.7 km), at a cost of £4.7 million. The agency estimated that without action flooding would occur once every 12 years, this was revised to every 75 years following the diversion.
