= Bailly, Oise =

Bailly
- Commune
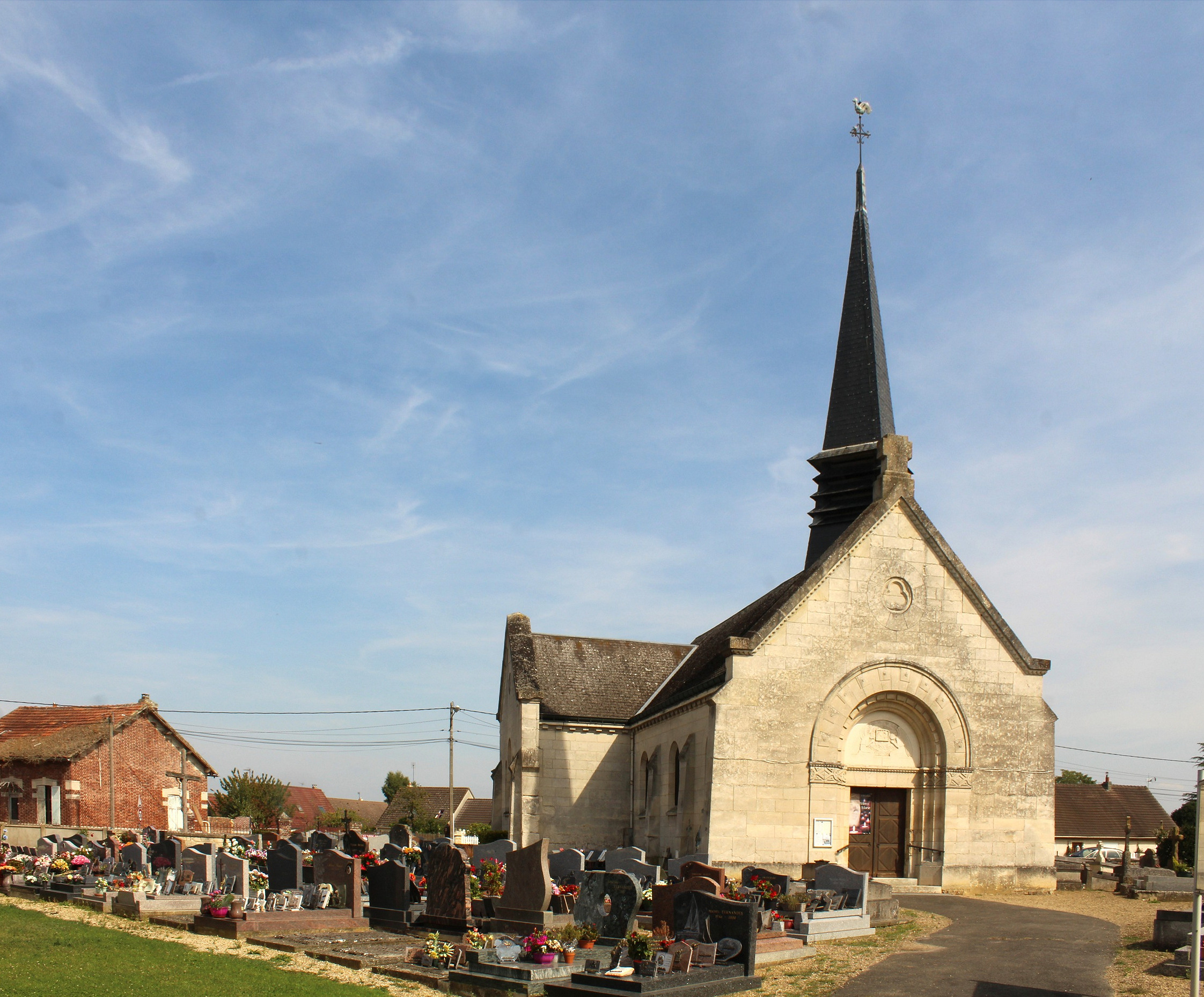
- Saint-Joseph Church in Bailly
- Location of Bailly
- Location within France Location within Hauts-de-France
- Coordinates: 49°29′47″N 2°58′14″E
- Country: France
- Region: Hauts-de-France
- Department: Oise
- Arrondissement: Compiègne
- Canton: Thourotte
- Intercommunality: Deux Vallées

Government
  - Mayor (2020–2026): Michel Lesueur
- Area^{1}: 4.26 km^{2} (1.64 sq mi)
- Elevation: 36 m (118 ft)
- Highest elevation: 50 m (160 ft)
- Lowest elevation: 33 m (108 ft)
- Population (2023): 599
  - Density: 141/km^{2} (364/sq mi)
- Time zone: UTC+01:00 (CET)
  - Summer (DST): UTC+02:00 (CEST)
- INSEE/Postal code: 60043 /60170
- ^{1} French Land Register data, which excludes lakes, ponds, glaciers > 1 km^{2} (0.386 sq mi or 247 acres) and river estuaries.

Bailly (French pronunciation: [baji]) is a commune in the Oise department in northern France.

== Population ==
Historical population
Year	Pop.	±% p.a.
1968	303	—
1975	402	+4.12%
1982	455	+1.78%
1990	599	+3.50%
1999	585	−0.26%
2007	601	+0.34%
2012	650	+1.58%
2017	636	−0.43%
2023	599	−0.99%
Source: INSEE

== See also ==
- Communes of the Oise department
