= Evatt =

The Evatt Coat of Arms of the Evatt family in New Zealand.

The surname Evatt is British, with Norman French roots. Modern spelling deviations include Evatte, Evett, Evettes, Evitt, Evitts, Evitte, and Evittes. Early British spellings of this surname did not include the double t, having, instead, a single t, as in Evot and Euote.

According to The Book of English Surnames, all of the above Evatt surname spellings are diminutives of Eve. Contrary to a commonly held belief, Evatt is not a derivative of the surname Evans, as Evan is the Welsh form of John, dating from about 1500 AD, well after the Evatt/Euote surname was already in wide use in England.

The surname Evatt/Euote was first seen in England in the year 1295 AD, and recorded in the Barnwell Church. The record concerned a William Walter Euote.

The known Evatt Family Tree begins with the William Walter Euote referenced above. He was born about 1266 AD near Ruskington in Lincolnshire County, in England.

The Evatt family name can be found in England, the United States, South Africa, Australia and New Zealand. More Evatts are found in South Carolina than any other part of the world.

Following World War II, Herbert Vere Evatt (1894-1965), Australian jurist, politician and writer, achieved international fame as the third President of the United Nations General Assembly in 1948-49, where he was instrumental in the drafting of the United Nations Universal Declaration of Human Rights (1948).

The Evatt family motto, as recorded on the 13th Century Evatt Coat of Arms held by the Evatt family of New Zealand, is "Be Just and Fear Not". An alternate version of the motto, as recorded on the 17th Century Family Crest held by the Evett Family of New Zealand, is "Festina Lente" - "More haste, less speed".
