= Ian Lyall Grant =

British army officer, engineer, and government official (1915–2020)

Major-General Ian Lyall Grant MC
- Born: 4 June 1915
- Died: 29 February 2020 (aged 104); Chichester, England
- Military career
- Allegiance: United Kingdom
- Branch: British Army
- Service years: 1935–1970
- Rank: Major-General
- Unit: Royal Engineers
- Conflicts: Second World War
- Awards: Military Cross

Major-General Ian Hallam Lyall Grant MC (4 June 1915 – 29 February 2020) was a British army officer and military engineer. He wrote two books based on his experience in the Burma campaign during the Second World War.

== Career ==
Lyall Grant was commissioned in the Royal Engineers on 31 January 1935,

== Later life and death ==
Major-General Ian Hallam Lyall Grant died at age 104 in a care home in Chichester.

== Books ==
- Burma: The Turning Point
- Burma 1942: the Japanese invasion; both sides tell the story of a savage jungle war. (co-authored with Kazui Tamayana). Chichester, Zampi Press. 1999. ISBN 978-0-9521083-1-3.
