= Battle of Tarentum (209 BC) =

Battle of the Second Punic War

Roman Recapture of Tarentum
- Part of the Second Punic War
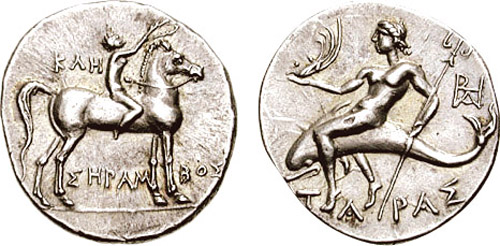
- Tarantine coin minted during Hannibal's occupation of the city 212–209 BC
Date	209 BC
Location	Tarentum, Southern Italy 40°28′N 17°14′E
Result	Roman victory

Belligerents
Roman Republic	Carthage

Commanders and leaders
Quintus Fabius Maximus Verrucosus	Carthalo †

Strength
20,000	Unknown

Casualties and losses
Unknown	Garrison captured or killed Population massacred 30,000 enslaved

The Battle of Tarentum of 209 BC took place during the Second Punic War. The Romans, led by Quintus Fabius Maximus Verrucosus, recaptured the city of Tarentum that had betrayed them in the first Battle of Tarentum in 212 BC. This time the commander of the city, Carthalo, turned against the Carthaginians, and supported the Romans.

== Siege ==
According to Plutarch, a Greek biographer, Fabius won the city of Tarentum through treachery. One of the soldiers in Fabius's army had a sister in Tarentum who was the lover of the Bruttian commander, Carthalo, who Hannibal had left in charge of the city. Carthalo was swayed to the Roman side and agreed to help the Romans gain entry into Tarentum. However Plutarch also writes that another story is that it was Fabius's Bruttian mistress who seduced the commander over to the Roman side when she discovered that he was a fellow countryman.

Fabius drew Hannibal away from Tarentum by sending the garrison of Rhegium to plunder the lands of the Bruttians and to take Caulonia. Hannibal went to the aid of the Bruttians.

On the sixth day of the siege it was arranged that the commander would help the Romans gain entry to Tarentum. Fabius took a cohort to the appointed place while the rest of the army attacked the walls, luring the cities defenders away. The Bruttian gave the signal and Fabius and his men scaled the walls and took the city. (Plutarch does not mention what the Bruttian commander does to aid the Romans)

== Aftermath of the capture of Tarentum ==
In the Life of Fabius Maximus (22.4), Plutarch writes that "At this point, however, Fabius's ambition seems to have proved stronger than his principles." This seems to be true, as after capturing the city, Fabius ordered that the Bruttians stationed in the city were to be killed to ensure no knowledge of the treachery spread to Rome. After that, a number of Tarentines were killed with 30,000 being sold into slavery. The Roman army ransacked the city, stealing 3,000 Attic talents to enrich the treasury, though on the orders of Fabius the statues and paintings of the Gods were left apart from the statue of Hercules which was taken to Rome. Fabius's victory allowed him to celebrate his second triumph.

According to Plutarch (Life of Fabius Maximus 23.1), Hannibal was within five miles when Tarentum fell to the Romans. He is said to have remarked in public that "It seems that the Romans have found another Hannibal, for we have lost Tarentum in the same way we took it."

== See also ==
- Battle of Tarentum (212 BC) – Hannibal's capture of the city, Second Punic War
