= Battle of Tarentum (212 BC) =

Hannibal's capture of the city, Second Punic War

The Assault on Tarentum
- Part of the Second Punic War
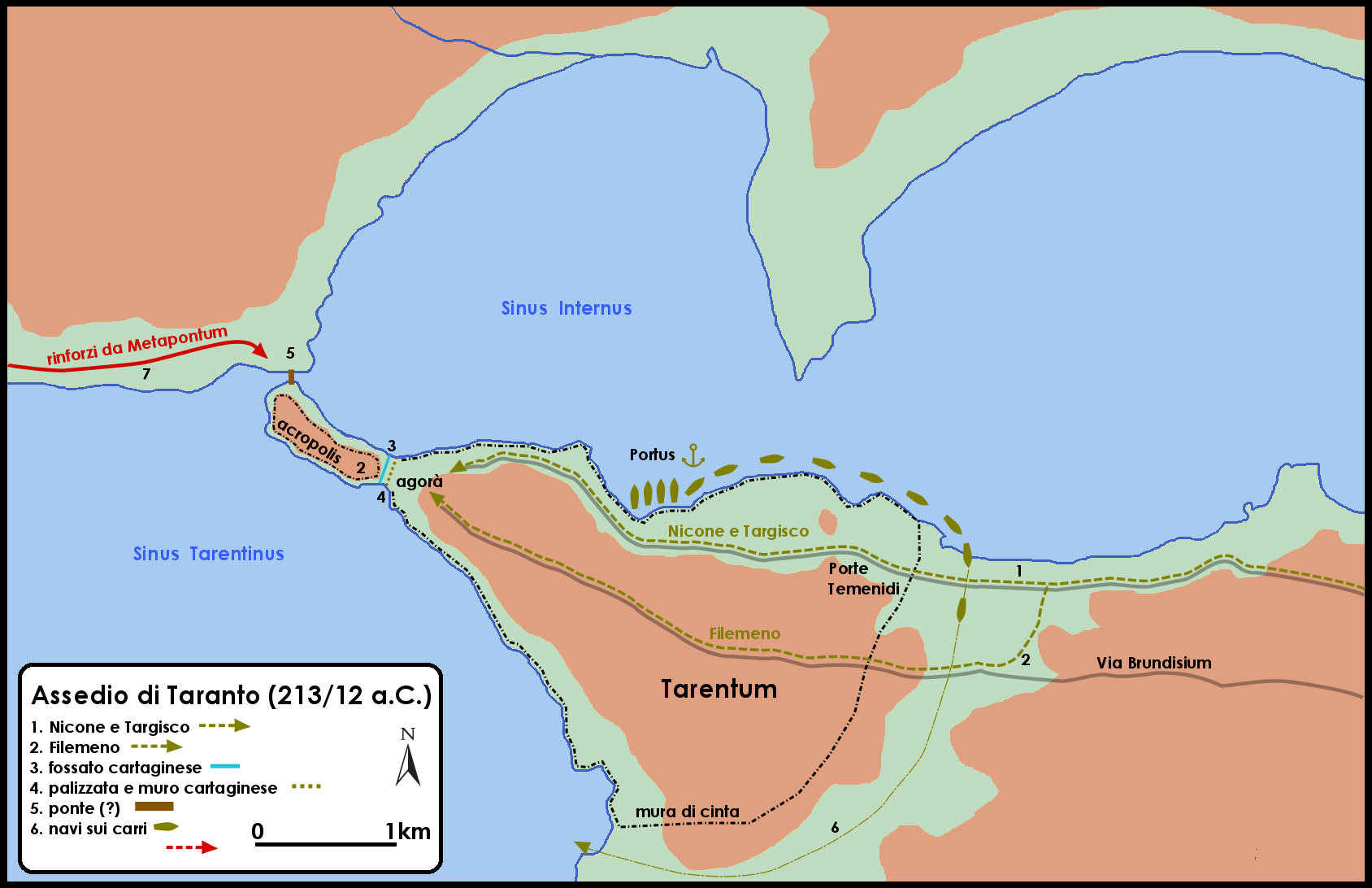
- Hannibal's assault on Tarentum
Date	March 212 BC
Location	Tarentum, Southern Italy 40°28′N 17°14′E
Result	Carthaginian victory
Territorial changes	City of Tarentum captured by Hannibal, but citadel remains in Roman hands

Belligerents
Carthage	Roman Republic

Commanders and leaders
Hannibal; Philomenus; Nico	Marcus Livius Macatus

Strength
8,000 infantry 2,000 cavalry	5,000 infantry

Casualties and losses
Unknown	Heavy

The Battle of Tarentum in March 212 BC was a military engagement in the Second Punic War.

== Prelude ==
The Romans had been waiting for a chance to strike at Capua, the capital of Campania in southern Italy, after it revolted against them following their defeat by the Carthaginian Hannibal at Cannae in 216 BC. Hannibal had made the city his winter headquarters, and his proximity deterred the Romans. In 212 BC, however, Hannibal was called south to Tarentum, giving the Romans a chance to strike. Hannibal hoped for a success big enough to risk the loss of Capua. His eyes had long been set on the city of Tarentum, the richest in the whole of southern Italy.

== Tarentum's dislike of Rome ==
Hannibal had been in communication with a party of Tarentine citizens who were unhappy with Roman rule. A previous attempt had been made by the people of Tarentum to rid themselves of the Romans. However, it was thwarted by the precautions that the Roman commander of Brundisium had taken. He took effectual means for the defence of the city and sent some of the possible malcontents to Rome to serve as hostages for the good behaviour of the rest of the population. These hostages were later caught trying to escape, several of whom were then convicted by the quaestores parricidii and sentenced to be flung from the Tarpeian Rock. This act infuriated the people of Tarentum, who renewed their communications with Hannibal.

A conspiracy was formed by a group of young aristocrats led by two Tarentines called Philemenus and Nico (Nikon in Greek). They secretly travelled to Hannibal's camp and negotiated conditions of Tarentum's betrayal. The city was guaranteed freedom of rule, was not to pay tribute and was not to be garrisoned.

== Hannibal's assault ==
Hannibal had picked 8,000 infantry and 2,000 cavalry as a strike force to take the city. He marched them to Tarentum stealthily. Philemenus then led 1,000 Libyan soldiers from Hannibal's strike force towards a gate he habitually used for hunting trips, whilst Hannibal himself marched the rest of the infantry towards the Temenid Gate. Hannibal kept the 2,000 cavalry in reserve to exploit their success or cover their retreat. When Philomenus and his fellow conspirators were admitted into the city, they surprised the guards, killed them and opened the gate. The Libyans entered the city and fought their way towards the Forum. Meanwhile another group of conspirators had killed the guards at the Temenid Gate and admitted Hannibal's force into the city. They marched on the Forum and secured it. From there Hannibal dispatched detachments to take strategic points in the city.

Marcus Livius, the governor general of the city, was a good soldier but is said to be a man of indolent and luxurious habits. On the night appointed by Hannibal for the attack he was feasting with friends and retired to rest, heavy with food and wine. In the middle of the night he was awakened when the conspirators blew the alarm on some Roman trumpets and found Hannibal and 10,000 of his soldiers already within the city. Many of the Roman soldiers were asleep or drunk and were cut down by the Carthaginians as they stumbled out into the streets. Hannibal kept control of his troops to the extent that there was no general looting. Committed to respecting Tarentine freedom, Hannibal asked the Tarentines to mark houses where Tarentines lived. Only those houses not so marked and thus belonging to Romans were looted. Marcus Livius and his surviving troops managed to hold onto the citadel where they held off the Carthaginians for the duration of the war. The city, however, was lost.

The Romans responded by sending the entire garrison of Metapontum to reinforce the defenders of citadel of Tarentum, shipping them there by sea. This, however, prompted the defection of Metapontum. Hannibal tried to take the citadel of Tarentum by direct assault, but this failed. He then showed the Tarentines how to drag their galleys from the harbour and down one of the main streets to get them to the open sea, allowing them to blockade the citadel by sea.

All the Greek towns in Southern Italy with the exception of Rhegium were now under Hannibal's control.

== Aftermath ==
Southern Italy provided Hannibal with a powerful foothold on the peninsula. However, when he heard news that the Romans were besieging Capua he turned his army around and only days after capturing Tarentum he was outside Capua. In the First Battle of Capua the besieging armies were temporarily driven off. At this point in history Hannibal looked invincible, having allies in southern Gaul, and owning Southern Italy and Iberia. Cities in Sicily such as Syracuse had revolted as well. Hannibal was also promised the support (which never came) of the powerful army of King Philip V of Macedon across the Adriatic. However, Hannibal's successes were not enduring. The Romans soon re-established their siege of Capua, and took the city following the Second Battle of Capua the next year. In 209 BC, Quintus Fabius Maximus Verrucosus recaptured Tarentum through treachery. In the following years, Scipio Africanus rose to prominence in Rome's military campaigns, and by copying Hannibal's tactics, eventually gained victory over Carthage.

== See also ==
- Battle of Tarentum (209 BC) – Battle of the Second Punic War
