= Fort Delgrès =

Historic fort in Guadeloupe

- Basse-Terre, Guadeloupe
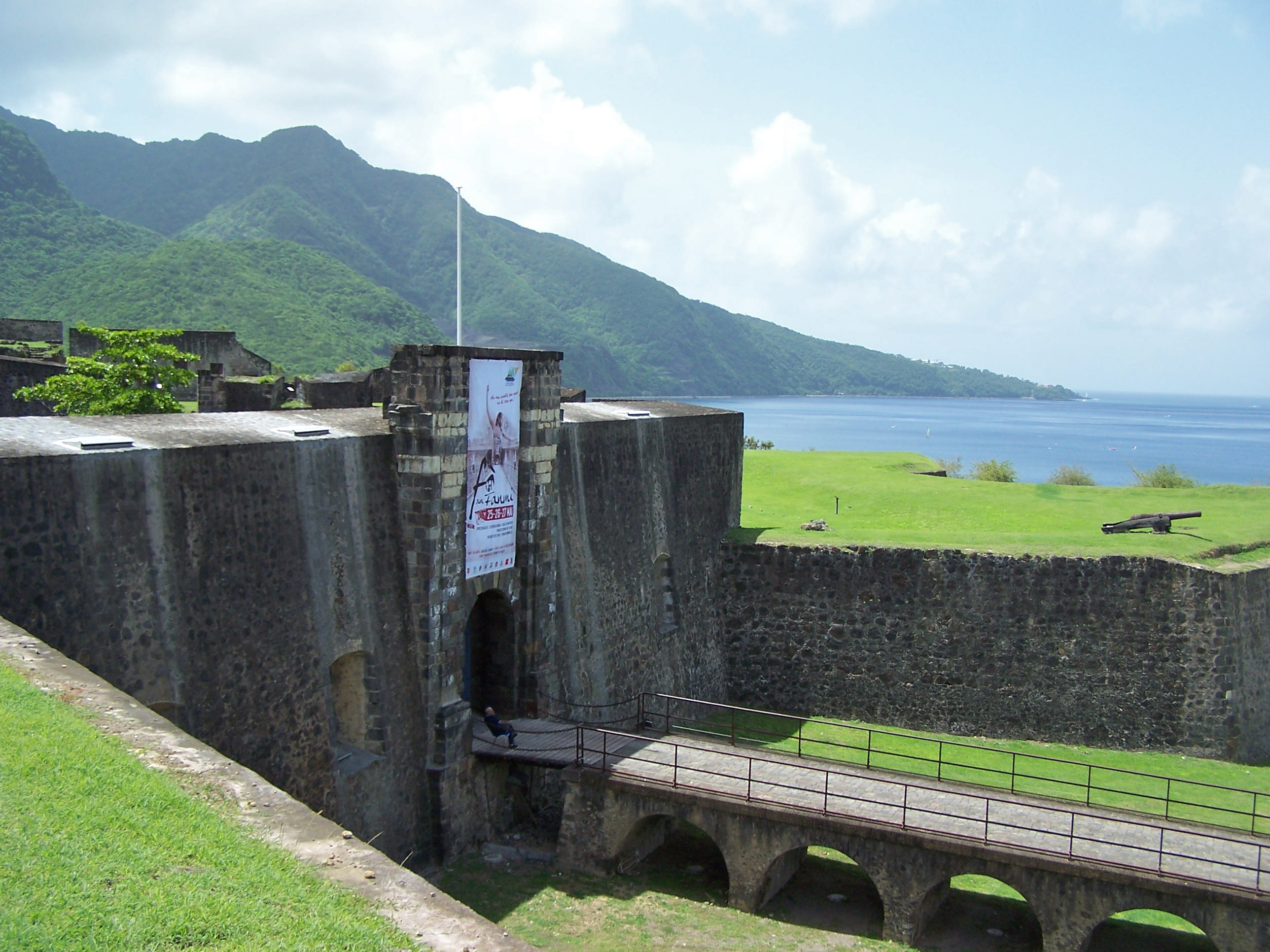
- Fort Delgrès entrance

Site information
- Type: Fortification
- Owner: Guadeloupe
- Open to the public: Yes

Location
- Location within Guadeloupe Location within the Caribbean
- Coordinates: 15.988611°N 61.723056°W
- Area: 5 hectares (12.4 acres)

Site history
- Built: 1650
- Built by: Charles Houël
- Battles/wars: 1802 Rebellion (Battle of Matouba)

Garrison information
- Designations: Classified historical monument (France)

Fort Delgrès (or Fort Louis Delgrès; formerly Fort Saint-Charles) is a French fort overlooking the town of Basse-Terre in Guadeloupe. It was a key site in the Franco-British struggle in the Caribbean, and later in the resistance of the Guadeloupeans led by the Louis Delgrès, who opposed the re-establishment of slavery entrusted to Antoine Richepanse by Napoleon I. The fort was classified as an official French historical monument by decree in 1977.

== History ==
=== Construction and various names ===
In 1649, the governor of Guadeloupe Charles Houël commissioned the construction of a keep called Château de Basse-Terre. It was four-story square tower measuring approximately 11 meters on each side, situated on high ground overlooking the island's capital, Basse-Terre. He had the tower reinforced with octagonal corner bastions, and two walled courtyards to the east and west. The tower served as a secure stronghold as well as being a symbol of Houël's authority over the population.

Over the subsequent decades, the structure underwent multiple modifications as well as name changes. It was originally called Fort Houël or Château de M. Houël. It was renamed multiple times over the next decades: Château de Guadeloupe in 1700, Fort Saint-Charles in 1753, Fort Royal (1759–1763), and Fort Matilda in 1794.

In 1803, it was named Fort Richepance to commemorate General Richepance's suppression of the 1802 rebellion led by Louis Delgrès against the re-establishment of slavery. Its name reverted to Fort Matilda in 1810, to Saint-Charles in 1815, to Fort Richepance in 1831, and then back to Fort Saint-Charles in 1960. Its current name, Fort Delgrès, was adopted in 1989 in honor of Louis Delgrès, the 1802 rebellion leader who had become a symbol of the struggle against slavery.

=== Decommissioning and after ===
On August 23, 1904, the fort was officially decommissioned by the military. On July 15, 1912, the public sale of all forts in Guadeloupe was authorized, with the obligation to dismantle them. In January 1916, the recruits for the war were quartered in the fort. On May 26, 1917, Governor Merwart issued a decree classifying the fort as a notable monument of Guadeloupe; however, some plots of land were sold to private individuals while others were squatted. From 1924, it was used as a banana warehouse for export by Maurice Fissier, who initiated renovations such as replacing the bridge. In 1950, the large barracks that housed the army at the time were destroyed by fire.

In 1975, the French State ceded it to the General Council of Guadeloupe for the symbolic price of one franc. It was classified as a monument historique in 1977. It was renamed Fort Delgrès in 1989 by the General Council of Guadeloupe in homage to abolitionist Louis Delgrès. Since 2004, it has been owned and housed by the Directorate of Cultural Affairs and Heritage. The fort was restored during 1993, with the support of volunteers from the Chantiers Histoire et Architecture Médiévales association.

== Description ==
=== Location ===
The fort is located at the southern end of the town of Basse-Terre, bordering the Galion River and the Caribbean Sea. It overlooks Basse-Terre, the sea, and the mountains.

The fort can be accessed via Rue du Gouverneur-Aubert (Gouverneur-Aubert Street) in the Quartier du Carmel (Carmel district).

=== Construction ===
Map of Fort Delgrès (French language)

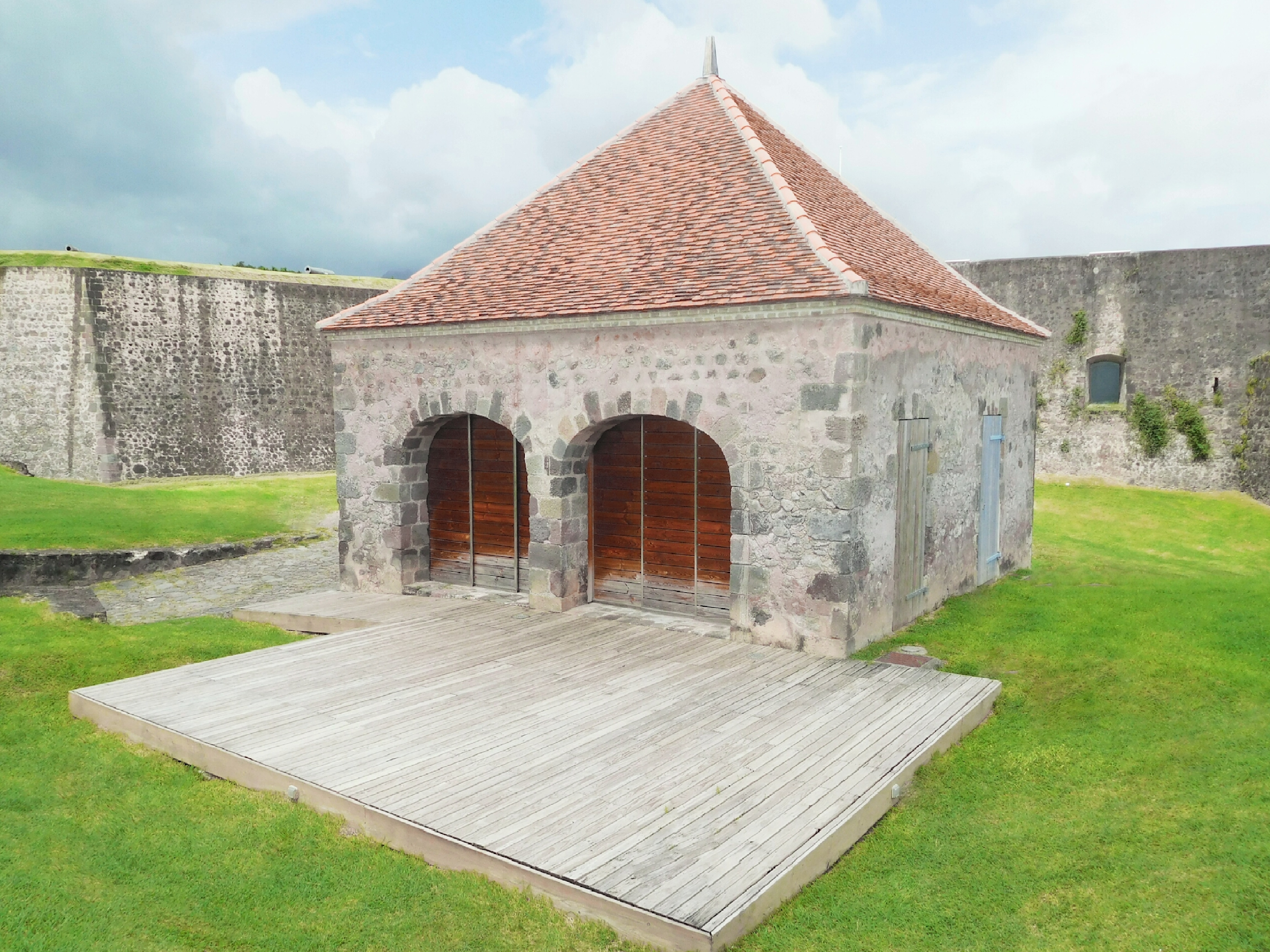
The fort's guardhouse

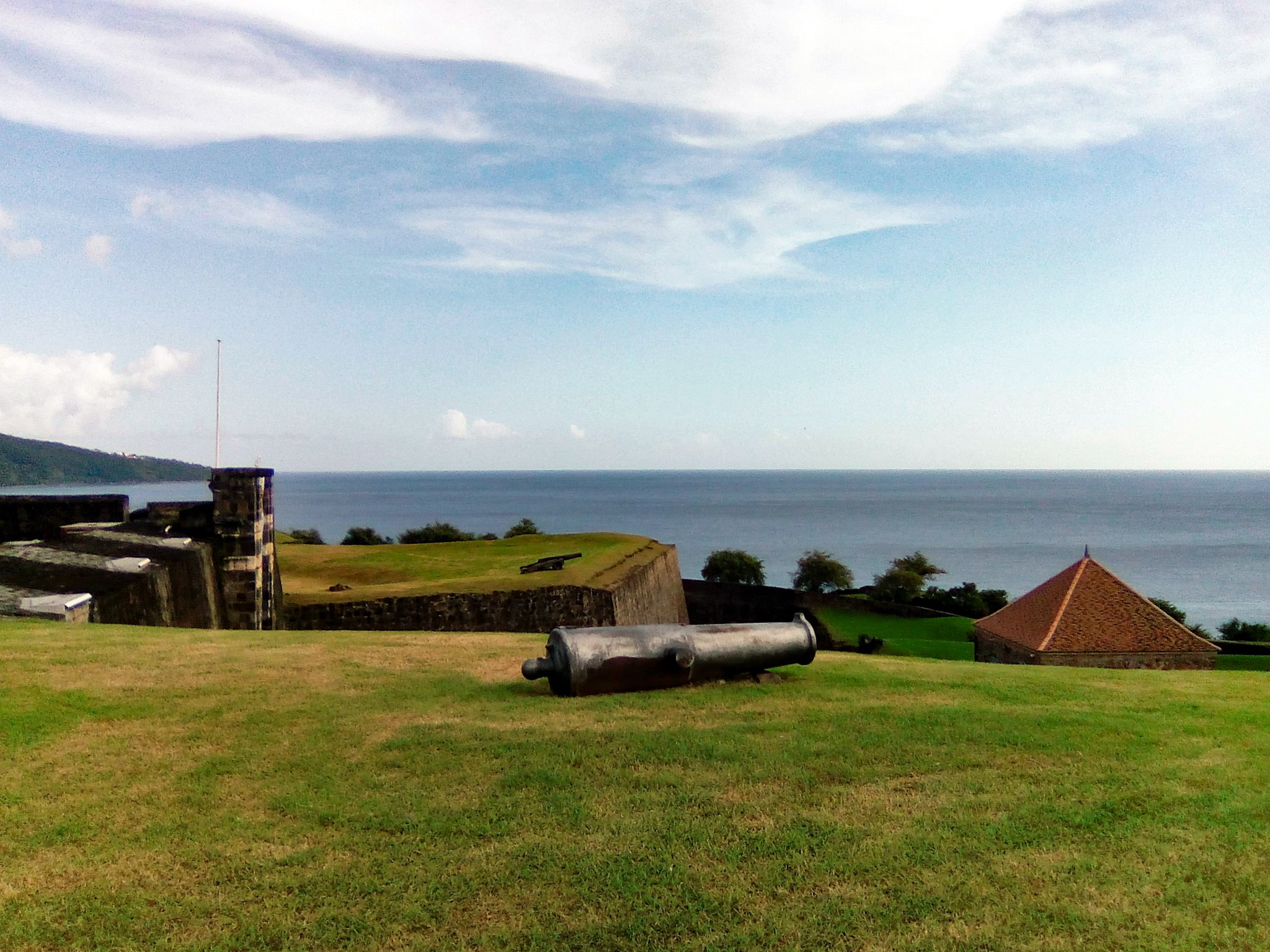
A bastion at the fort

The original fort was built in the 17th century; it subsequently underwent two major expansions, first between 1720–1759 and then between 1763 and 1790. The fort is built of stone.

The fort was originally laid out east-to-west, perpendicular to the sea, Its main weakness was its vulnerable to enemy cannon fire from the sea. Protective traverses were built to halt the path of cannonballs and compartmentalize each section.

Between 1720 and 1759, casemates, a postern, and a large powder magazine were added to complete the oldest part of the monument.

Between 1763 and 1790, kitchens, cisterns, and an underground passage leading into the moats (in the direction of the Carmel District) were added. Large, crescent-shaped buttresses were added to further strengthen the fort.
