= F (Sphinx) Parachute Battery Royal Horse Artillery =

British Army airborne artillery battery

- Active: 4 December 1800 – present
- Country: United Kingdom
- Allegiance: East India Company (until 1858); United Kingdom (post 1858)
- Branch: British Army
- Type: Parachute Artillery
- Role: Close support
- Size: Battery
- Part of: 7th Parachute Regiment Royal Horse Artillery
- Garrison/HQ: Merville Barracks, Colchester, Essex, England
- Nickname: The Yellow Dog
- Anniversaries: 19 April – Ahmed Khel Day
- Equipment: L118 Light Gun
- Battle honours: Ubique

F (Sphinx) Parachute Battery Royal Horse Artillery is a close support battery of 7th Parachute Regiment Royal Horse Artillery, part of the Royal Horse Artillery of the British Army, currently based in Merville Barracks in Colchester.

== History ==
=== Creation ===
The Battery was raised in India in 1800 as an experimental Brigade of Horse Artillery. They were immediately sent to Egypt to join the force that was operating against Napoleon’s Army. The Troop sailed to the Red Sea coast where they marched across the desert. This took a heavy toll on the troops and particularly on their horses and by the time they reached the Nile the guns were being towed by camels. The Troop sailed up the Nile to Giza, home of the Sphinx, where they were encamped on the Isle of Roda. By the time they were ordered to march to Rosetta the French had given up Alexandria so the Troop never had the glory of facing Napoleon's Army in the field. On leaving Egypt the Troop returned to India where they were garrisoned at Dum Dum, Calcutta. In 1926 the honour title Sphinx was awarded to the Battery for services in the 1801 campaign against the French in Egypt.

=== Anglo-Afghan Wars ===
In 1842 the Troop, then known as 1st Troop, 1st Brigade Bengal Horse Artillery was involved in the famous retreat from Kabul during the First Afghan Campaign. The Troop was part of a force of 4,500 men and 12,000 civilians who left Kabul in January 1842 and were massacred by Afghan tribesmen.

“Owing to the starved condition of the horses, which rendered them unable to drag the guns of the Battery through the deep snow and rugged mountain passes, the guns were, one after the other, spiked and abandoned. The Captain, two officers and 102 NCOs and men were killed in the retreat.”

The Troop was reformed in Dum Dum and saw action in Afghanistan again in the Second Anglo-Afghan War from 1878–80, then renamed A Bty, B Brigade RHA.

On 19 April 1880 the Battery was part of a force marching from Kandahar to Ghazni to open up the route to Kabul. They met the enemy at the village of Ahmed Khel where the Battery fought a magnificent action repelling the enemy charge and allowing the main force time to deploy. In describing the action Major May said that “no Artillery has ever been called upon to repel a more determined charge, one which no Europeans would have ventured to make at all.” The following day, at the fort of Ghunzi, two of the original guns lost in 1842 were recovered by the Battery. One is currently still in India while the other, the Ahmed Khel gun, is owned by the current Battery.

=== India ===
The Battery was based at Dum Dum, near Calcutta, for most of the 19th century where it was involved in numerous conflicts and uprisings including the Mahratta War, the Gurkha War and the Burma War. The most renowned campaign the Battery fought during its time in India was during the Indian Mutiny in 1857 where it was involved in the Relief of Lucknow. The Residency at Lucknow had been besieged by Indian Troops for nearly six months before a British relief force, including the Battery, arrived. During the fighting Gunner and Rough Rider Edward Jennings received the Victoria Cross for his actions. Jennings was decorated for conspicuous gallantry and action that involved the rescue of a British officer from the hands of the mutineers. Jennings' VC is now owned by the Battery and his exploits are remembered by the crimson stripes of the VC ribbon that now adorn the Battery stable belt.

=== World Wars ===
Now named F Battery RHA, the Battery was heavily involved in the fighting on the Western Front during World War I seeing action in Ypres, Loos, the Somme, Arras and Cambrai amongst others as well as in Italy.

Between the wars, the Battery spent several years based at St John's Wood performing ceremonial duties. It was based in Rawalpindi India, during the 1930s. At the outbreak of World War II, the Battery moved to Cairo where it became part of 4th RHA. The Battery was part of Montgomery’s famous 7th Armoured Division (The Desert Rats), where it was equipped with 25pdrs guns.

=== Cold War years ===
In 1961 the Battery became part of 7th Parachute Regiment Royal Horse Artillery and moved from Germany to Aldershot as F (Sphinx) Parachute Battery RHA. Its first operational tour in this role was in Aden where it was involved in fierce fighting in the Radfan mountains.

The Battery was then despatched for four Operation Banner tours in Northern Ireland, the final of these being a full Battery deployment to South Armagh as part of 1 Royal Scots BG. In 1994 the Battery deployed to Cyprus as part of UNFICYP and were responsible for Sector Two of the buffer zone where they patrolled the contested line and provided the Force and Sector reserve.

1996 saw the Battery deployed to Bosnia as part of the NATO-led Implementation Force (IFOR). The Bty was split into 2 independent troops of 3 guns alternating deployments as well as deploying all six guns together when there was a requirement to 'show presence'.

=== Recent deployments ===
In 1999 the Battery along with the rest of the Regiment became part of the newly formed 16 Air Assault Brigade.

In 2003 the Battery accompanied the Regiment to Iraq where the Regiment fired all 18 guns in the first shots fired by any coalition troops in the ground campaign. The battery then moved into Iraq to secure the Rumaylah oilfields where they were involved in a substantial counter-battery battle with Iraqi artillery units. BK Capt Grant Ingleton was awarded the MC for his actions on the gun position during the counter-battery duel. The Bty then re-rolled into the infantry role to conduct peace support operations in Maysan Province.

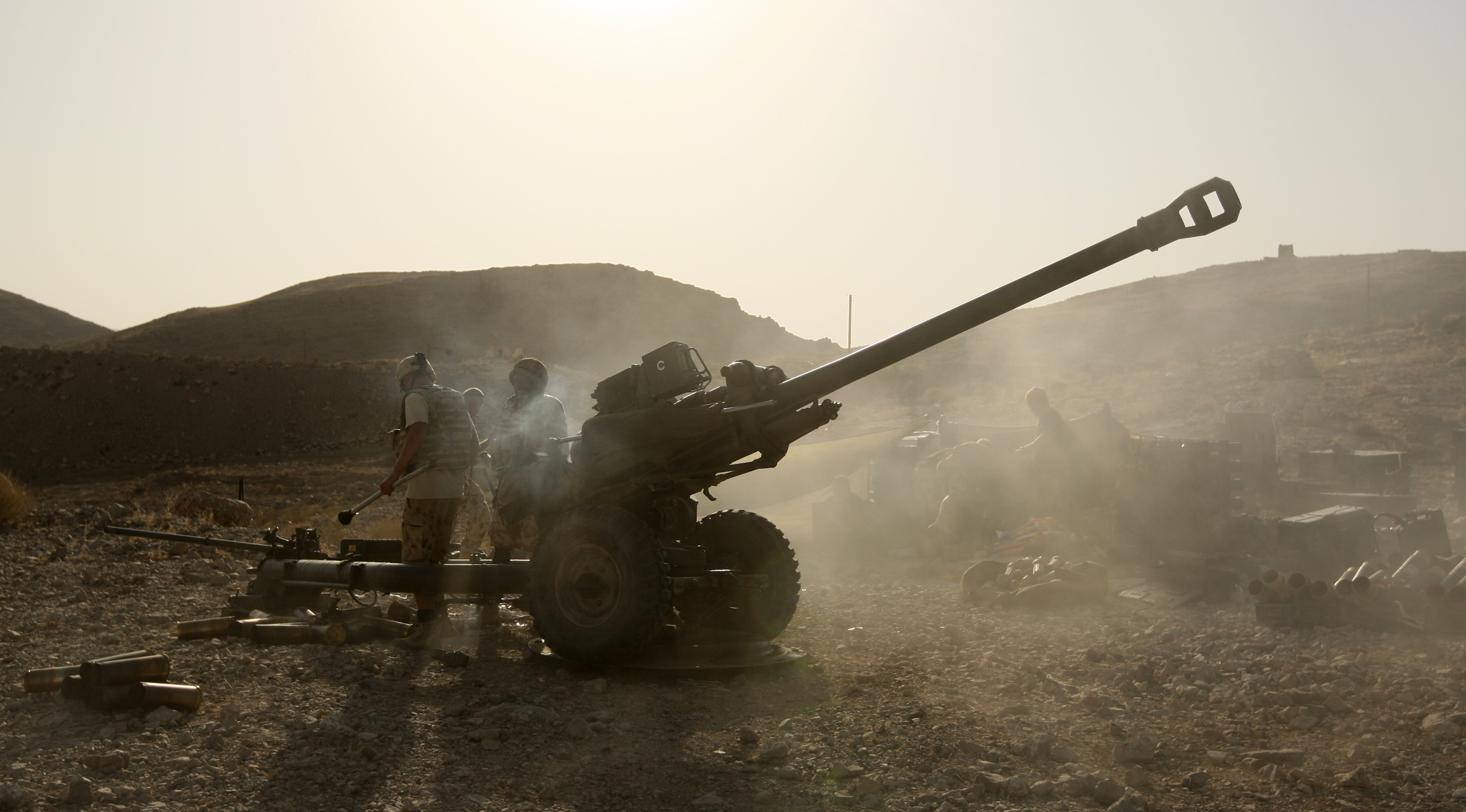
ISAF soldiers with 7th Parachute Regiment Royal Horse Artillery fire their 105mm Light Gun at Taliban positions. Kajaki, Afghanistan, 28 August 2008

2006 saw members of the Battery deploy on the first of 3 tours to Helmand Province, Afghanistan. On 11 June 2006 Captain Jim Philippson RHA became the first British soldier to be killed in Helmand as a result of enemy action. Later in the tour Lance Bombardier (LBdr) Ben Parkinson was seriously injured when the vehicle he was travelling in hit a landmine. LBdr Parkinson has since received considerable press attention as one of the most seriously injured soldiers to survive the conflict.

Their most recent deployment saw the Battery's gun group deployed to Artillery Hill where they carried out mentoring and training with the Afghan National Army using Russian D30 guns. They returned to Colchester in April 2011.

== See also ==
- British Army
- Royal Artillery
- Royal Horse Artillery
- List of Royal Artillery Batteries

== Bibliography ==
- Clarke, W.G. (1993). Horse Gunners: The Royal Horse Artillery, 200 Years of Panache and Professionalism. Woolwich: The Royal Artillery Institution. ISBN 09520762-0-9.
