= Port Said Airport =

Port Said International Airport El Gamil Airport RAF El Gamil
- IATA: PSD; ICAO: HEPS

Summary
- Airport type: Public
- Operator: Government
- Serves: Port Said, Egypt
- Opened: 1941
- Elevation AMSL: 8 ft (2.4 m)
- Coordinates: 31°16′46″N 32°14′24″E

Map
- Location of airport in Sinai PSD (Egypt)

Runways
Direction	Length		Surface
Direction	m	ft	Surface
10/28	2,349	7,707	Asphalt
- Source: DAFIF

Port Said Airport (IATA: PSD, ICAO: HEPS) serves the city of Port Said, Egypt, at the north end of the Suez Canal. In 2011, the airport served 36,962 passengers (-5.5% vs. 2010).

== History ==
The airport was previously RAF El Gamil a Royal Air Force station operational during Second World War.

The following units were here at some point:

- Detachment from No. 33 Squadron RAF between June and September 1941 with the Hawker Hurricane I
- No. 73 Squadron RAF between 6 September 1941 and 3 February 1942 with the Hurricane I, IIB & IIC along with the Curtiss Tomahawk IIB
- Detachment from No. 80 Squadron RAF between May and July 1943 with the Supermarine Spitfire VC
- Detachment from No. 89 Squadron RAF between December 1941 and August 1942 with the Bristol Beaufighter IF
- No. 94 Squadron RAF between 1 June 1942 and 14 January 1943 with the Hurricane I & IIC and the Spitfire VC
- No. 213 (Ceylon) Squadron RAF between 25 February and 6 May 1944 with the Hurricane IIC, Spitfire VC and IX
- No. 238 Squadron RAF between 13 January 1943 and 29 January 1944 with the Spitfire VB, VC & IX
- No. 250 (Sudan) Squadron RAF between 3 February and 16 April 1942 with the Tomahawk IIB and Hurricane I & IIC
- No. 451 Squadron RAAF between 4 February and 18 April 1944 with the Spitfire VC & IX

After being handed over to Egyptian authorities, El Gamil Airfield was attacked by the British Armed Forces during November 1956 as part of Operation Telescope, Suez Crisis. It was then seized by 3rd Battalion, Parachute Regiment and French forces; and briefly hosted No. 215 Wing RAF which served as an airfield operating force, led by Group Captain W V Crawford-Compton DSO DFC, delivered by Sycamores and Whirlwind helicopters of the Joint Helicopter Unit; No. 48 Squadron RAF Regiment was brought in to defend the airfield. Quickly built up to a strength of about 360 RAF personnel, in was equally quickly used as the retreat airhead, with some 266 sorties excluding helicopters and light aircraft, by 26 November. It was then handed over to Larson Company of the Danish Battalion of UNEF I on 20 December 1956.

== Modernisation ==
The airport underwent a modernisation program with a partial inauguration in February 2011. The airport is seen to be vital for the coastal city and to sustain its industrial expansion plans.

== Airlines and destinations ==
There are currently no scheduled services to and from the airport.

== Accidents and incidents ==
- During a training flight on 15 January 2008, a Beech C90B King Air operated by the Nuclear Centre Survey crashed 500 meters from the airport while performing circuits, killing both the pilot and training pilot.
