= 299 Parachute Squadron, Royal Engineers =

Specialist reserve engineer unit of the British Army

299 Parachute Squadron 299 Parachute Troop 299 Commando Troop 299 Parachute Engineer Squadron 299 Airborne Field Squadron
- Brigade insignia of the 16th Air Assault Brigade, also used by 299 Parachute Squadron.
- Active: 1947 – present
- Country: United Kingdom
- Branch: British Army
- Type: Field Engineers
- Size: Squadron
- Part of: Royal Engineers: 23 Parachute Engineer Regiment
- Squadron HQ: Wakefield
- Engagements: Operation Telic; Operation Herrick

Insignia
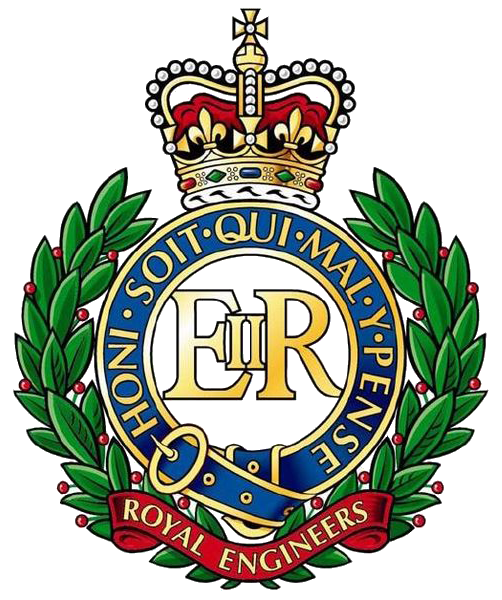
- Cap badge of the Royal Engineers

- TRF of the Royal Engineers

- DZ Flash of 23rd Engineer Regiment

299 Parachute Squadron, Royal Engineers (299 Para Sqn) is a specialist field engineer squadron of the British Army's Corps of Royal Engineers and the only reserve parachute unit of the corps. Formed in 1947 as an airborne field squadron, 299 Para Sqn would see many reorganisations and new roles, until 2006 when it took on the parachute role it maintains today. As of 2021, it is the only reserve parachute-trained squadron of the Royal Engineers.

== History ==
In 1947, as part of the establishment of the post-war Territorial Army (TA), 131st Airborne Engineer Regiment was formed by consolidated the former engineer companies (Note: Following the reorganisation of the Royal Engineers after the end of the Second World War, engineer 'companies' were redesigned as 'squadrons', though their size remained the same.) of the 16th Airborne Division (now entirely a TA division). One of the new squadrons which was formed as part of this regiment was 299 Airborne Field Squadron, which was based in Kingston upon Hull in the East Riding of Yorkshire. In 1956, as a result of cuts to the Army and end of National Service the next year, the 16th Airborne Division was broken up, and the engineer regiment became independent under London District. In 1961, the TA was reorganised, and the regiment was redesignated as 131st Parachute Engineer Regiment, retaining its independent role, now based in Chelsea (from 1949). However, because of an internal reorganisation, 299 Airborne Squadron was renamed as 299 Parachute Engineer Squadron became independent, now under Northern Command. In addition, Liverpool Troop of 300 Airborne Field Squadron also joined the squadron. Another reorganisation by 1956 saw the squadron reorganised as follows:

- Squadron Headquarters, in Kingston upon Hull
- No. 1 Troop, in Kingston upon Hill
- No. 2 Field Troop, in Liverpool
- No. 3 Field Troop, in Doncaster

In 1967, as a result of the 1966 Defence White Paper, the Territorial Army was completely reorganised and renamed as the Territorial and Army Volunteer Reserve (TAVR), with many of the old regiments being reduced to squadrons and squadrons in turn becoming troops. Because of the changes, 131st Parachute Engineer Regiment was reduced to 131 Independent Parachute Squadron, and 299 Parachute Squadron became 299 Parachute Troop. As part of the reductions, 131 Parachute Squadron was tasked with providing support to the parachute battalions, which each troop tasked with supporting a specific battalion. 299 Troop was later linked with 4th (Northern) Battalion, The Parachute Regiment.

In 1977, as result of the 1975 Defence White Paper, the 44th Independent Parachute Brigade Group was disbanded and the 131st Parachute Squadron's future was uncertain. However, on 1 April 1978, the squadron was taken into the order of battle of 3rd Commando Brigade of the Royal Marines, and the squadron became 131st Independent Commando Squadron. Consequently, 299 Parachute Troop became 299 Commando Troop, though an official parachute capability was retained. Later, 299 Troop achieved an operational first by constructing the first Medium Girder Bridge (MGB) to be flown into position.

In January 2003, 299 Troop was mobilised, along with the rest of 131 Independent Commando Squadron, for service on Operation TELIC, the forthcoming Invasion of Iraq. In the hours of darkness before 'H Hour', 299 Troop were busy clearing mines and other obstacles from 'Red Beach' in advance of a beach assault by the United States Marine Corps (USMC).

A further restructuring of the Territorial Army called for the creation of a parachute trained Royal Engineer Squadron and on 6 June 2006, 299 Parachute Squadron RE (V) was officially reformed at a parade held at the new Squadron Headquarters in Wakefield. The new Squadron Colours were raised by Norman Sangwin — one of the few surviving members of the original 299 Airborne Field Squadron RE (TA).

This new squadron was based on 299 Troop of 131 Commando Squadron RE (V), who became 1 Troop, and Minden Company, Light Infantry, whose Headquarters at George Street TA Centre was taken over as Headquarters of the reborn 299 Para Squadron, this being the location of HQ and 2 Troops. A third field troop, 3 Troop, was raised in Gateshead in 2009. The Squadron became part of the reformed 72nd (Tyne Electrical Engineers) Engineer Regiment (V).

Despite becoming part of the new 299 Para Squadron, 1 Troop still had an outstanding commitment to fulfil to 131 Independent Commando Squadron and the majority of the troop were mobilised for service in Afghanistan on Operation HERRICK V over the winter of 2006/7. The Sappers used their skills to provide close engineering support for 3rd Commando Brigade all over Helmand Province. Since then 299 Parachute Squadron soldiers have deployed on Operation Herrick in Helmand Province, Afghanistan in 2006, 2007, 2008 and 2009, serving as part of 16 Air Assault Brigade, 3 Commando Brigade and 19th Light Brigade.

In 2010, 299 Parachute Squadron RE was re-subordinated under 23 Engineer Regiment (Air Assault) which was renamed as 23 Parachute Engineer Regiment in 2015.

Since then, personnel from the Sqn have deployed to South Sudan as part of Operation TRENTON in 2016 & 2017. They formed part of the UK Engineering Task Force and assisted with the development of infrastructure, including roads which were vital to the delivery of humanitarian aid. Members of the Sqn also deployed on counter poaching operations in Africa as part of Operation CORDED 5 in 2019. More recently, personnel have also supported homeland resilience operations including Operation RESCRIPT in 2020 (COVID-19 response), Operation UNITY (Commonwealth Games 2022) and Operation BALLAM (Supporting state funeral for HM Queen Elizabeth II). During 2022, four personnel also mobilised overseas in support of Operation SHADER.

In 2023, seven members of the Squadron were mobilised to support Operation ILKANE. Another UK resilience task which provided a contingency force during planned UK Border Force strikes. One Sapper also volunteered for ceremonial public duties in London and joined regular soldiers & officers from 23 Parachute Engineer Regiment guarding Buckingham Palace, Windsor Castle and St James Palace. Part of a year of celebration to recognise 23 years since the formation of the Regiment.

In late 2023, two members from the Squadron were mobilised to support Op TOSCA 39. A longstanding UK peacekeeping commitment which sees soldiers deploy on a six month UN tour of duty where they are responsible for maintaining the integrity of the Buffer Zone that runs between the Greek and Turkish Cypriots. In 2024, another five soldiers from the Squadron deployed on Op TOSCA 40 in support of 4 PARA.

== Organisation ==
Since 2017, the structure of the squadron has been as follows:

- Squadron Headquarters, in Wakefield
- No. 1 Parachute Troop, in Kingston upon Hull
- No. 2 Parachute Troop, in Wakefield
- No. 3 Parachute Troop, in Gateshead
- HQ & Support Troop, in Wakefield

== Parachute training ==
On completion of basic training and entry into the squadron, soldiers are required to attempt All Arms Pre Parachute Selection (P Company). For reservists, this consists of six training weekends, followed by a 10-day selection course at Catterick.

Soldiers who pass P Coy are then offered the opportunity to attend a three week course at RAF Brize Norton known as the Basic Parachute Course. Since 1995, all parachute jumps are carried out from powered aircraft. Prior to 1995, the first jump in the Basic Parachute Course was undertaken from a modified Barrage balloon, but this has since been replaced with the Skyvan. Recruits must complete a minimum of four jumps in order to qualify as a military parachutist. Further jumps are then required from a C130 Hercules to qualify the parachutist as Combat Ready.
