= Giles Hill =

British Army general

Lieutenant General Giles Hill CB CBE
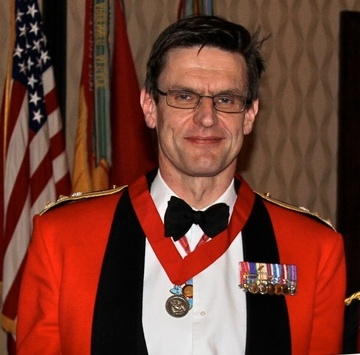
- Military career
- Allegiance: United Kingdom
- Branch: British Army
- Service years: 1989–2021
- Rank: Lieutenant General
- Service number: 533082
- Unit: Parachute Regiment
- Commands: 1st (United Kingdom) Division; 16 Air Assault Brigade; 1st Battalion, Parachute Regiment
- Conflicts: Operation Banner; Iraq War; War in Afghanistan
- Awards: Companion of the Order of the Bath; Commander of the Order of the British Empire; Queen's Commendation for Valuable Service; Officer of the Legion of Merit (United States); NATO Meritorious Service Medal

Lieutenant General Giles Patrick Hill, CB, CBE is a retired senior British Army officer. He commanded the 1st (United Kingdom) Division from 2015 to 2017, was Assistant Chief of the Defence Staff from 2017 to 2019, and served as the Deputy Commander of NATO's Resolute Support Mission in Afghanistan from 2019 until December 2020.

== Early life and education ==
Hill was born in Leeds, Yorkshire, England. He was educated at Lawnswood School, a state secondary school in Leeds.

== Military career ==
Hill served for two years as a private with the 4th Battalion, Parachute Regiment, Territorial Army, before being accepted into the Royal Military Academy Sandhurst in 1989. He was commissioned into the Parachute Regiment, British Army, on 13 April 1990 as a second lieutenant. He served several tours in Northern Ireland as part of Operation Banner in the 1990s. He commanded A Company of 3rd Battalion, Parachute Regiment during Operation Telic in Iraq, for which he was awarded a Queen's Commendation for Valuable Service, and then became commanding officer of the 1st Battalion, Parachute Regiment on operations in both Iraq and Afghanistan.

Hill went on to be commander of 16 Air Assault Brigade in May 2011, and Deputy Commander of the 82nd Airborne Division at Fort Bragg in 2013. He was appointed a Commander of the Order of the British Empire (CBE) in the 2014 Birthday Honours. In February 2015, he was inducted into the Order of Saint Barbara, a US military honour society.

In April 2015, he was appointed General Officer Commanding 1st (United Kingdom) Division and promoted to the rank of major general. He became Assistant Chief of the Defence Staff (Defence Engagement) in April 2017. Hill was promoted to lieutenant general on 19 October 2019 and assumed the appointment of Deputy Commander Resolute Support Mission. He was appointed a Companion of the Order of the Bath in the 2021 New Year Honours, and retired on 30 November 2021.

In January 2022, Hill was appointed as Honorary Colonel of 4th Battalion, Parachute Regiment.

Military offices
Preceded by James Chiswell	General Officer Commanding 1st (United Kingdom) Division; 2015–2017	Succeeded by Ralph Wooddisse
