= 7th Parachute Regiment Royal Horse Artillery =

British Army airborne artillery regiment

- Active: 27 June 1961 – present All of the individual batteries were formed in the period 1800-1805 and have existed continuously since their formation.
- Allegiance: United Kingdom
- Branch: British Army
- Role: Close Support Artillery
- Size: 5 Batteries; 357 personnel
- Part of: 16 Air Assault Brigade Combat Team
- Garrison/HQ: Merville Barracks, Colchester
- Drop Zone Flash
- Equipment: L118 Light Gun

Commanders
- Current commander: Lt Col Sharp RHA

7th Parachute Regiment, Royal Horse Artillery is an airborne regiment of the Royal Artillery in the British Army. It currently serves in the field artillery role with 16 Air Assault Brigade Combat Team, and is equipped with the L118 Light Gun.

The regiment was constituted in 1961 out of existing batteries that have served continuously since the Napoleonic Wars.

== History ==
The regiment was formed on 27 June 1961 with the re-designation of 33rd Parachute Light Regiment Royal Artillery as 7th Parachute Regiment Royal Horse Artillery. The regiment first saw action in the middle-east in Kuwait in 1961 and then in Aden in 1963–65 where it was involved in fierce fighting in the Radfan mountains. The 1970s and 80s saw the regiment involved in four Northern Ireland tours in the infantry role as well as a period where they briefly lost their airborne status and were arms-plotted to Germany until 1984 when they joined newly formed 5th Airborne Brigade and returned to Aldershot.

In 1994 the regiment deployed to Cyprus as part of the UN mission to patrol the buffer-zone between Cypriot and Turkish forces. This was followed in 1996–97 with two battery deployments to Bosnia as part of the NATO mission and the Kosovo campaign of 1999.

Since the formation of 16 Air Assault Brigade in 1999, 7 Para RHA has been involved in numerous overseas operations. The Sierra Leone campaign in summer 2000 was followed by involvement in the 2001 Macedonia conflict as 'Operation Essential Harvest' a year later. The regiment also sent a number of troops to Northern Ireland in 2001 who were at the forefront of the Holy Cross riots in that year while deployed with the 1st Battalion, the Royal Irish Regiment. Two batteries deployed to the Kabul area of Afghanistan in early 2002.

On the afternoon of 19 March 2003 the regiment fired the first shots of the Iraq War by any coalition ground forces. The next day they crossed the border in support of the US I Marine Expeditionary Force. The regiment was instrumental in securing the strategic Rumalya oilfields and supporting the MEF in their move north to Nasiriyah.

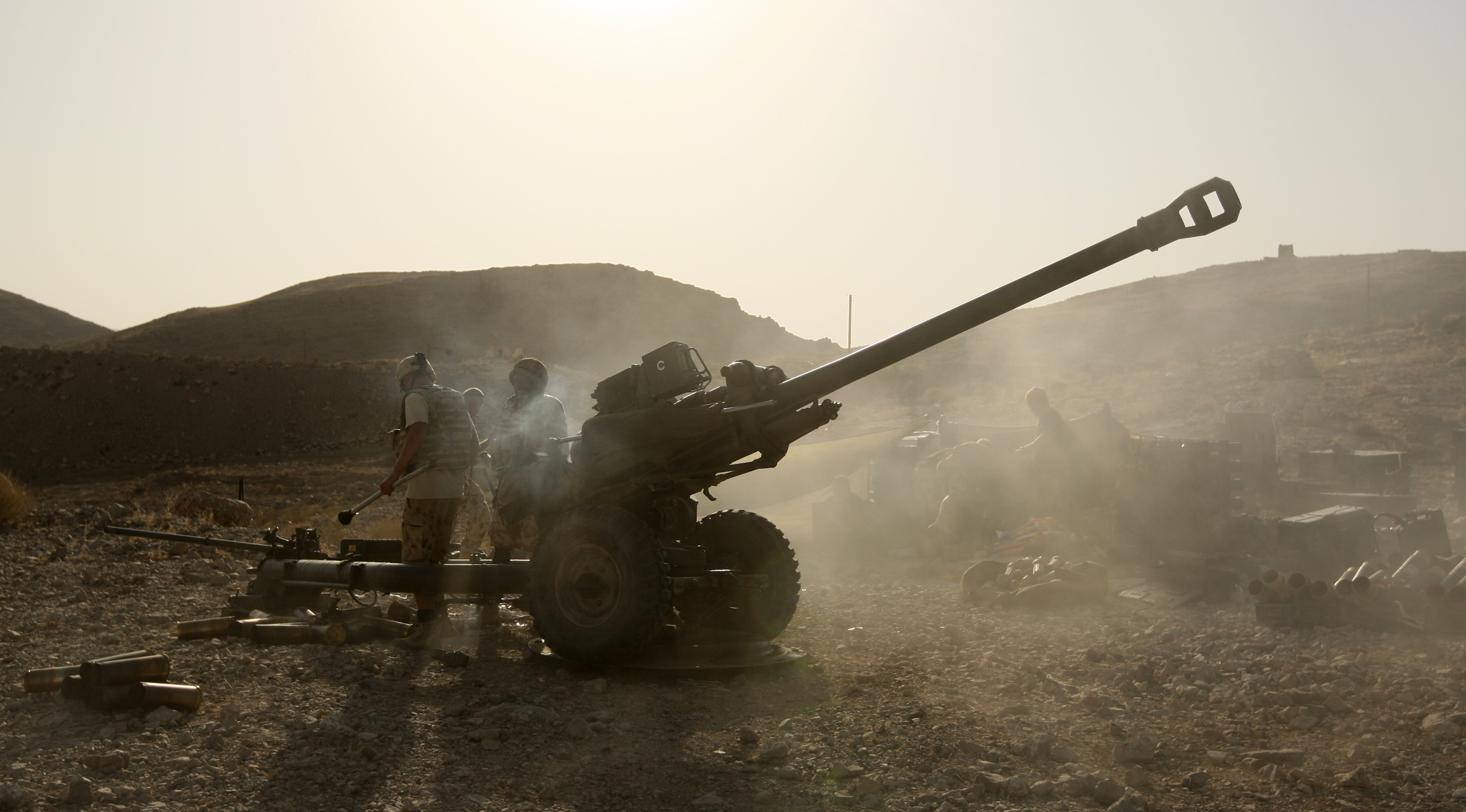
Gunners of 7 Parachute Regiment, Royal Horse Artillery, fire their 105mm Light Gun at Taliban positions in Afghanistan during August 2008

In late 2003 the regiment moved from Aldershot to Colchester to join the rest of 16 Air Assault Brigade. 2006 saw the first of the regiment's three tours of Afghanistan. The first of these saw the regiment play a key role in the break into Helmand province. This tour attracted much public attention and has often been described as the most intense combat fighting since the Korean War of the 1950s. The regiment returned to Helmand two years later and were again involved in heavy fighting – cumulating in the large scale operation to move a turbine from Kandahar along a heavily mined and fiercely defended road to the Kajaki Dam. 7 Para RHA's final deployment on Op Herrick saw the regiment's gun groups and Fire Support Teams deploy to central Helmand Province in order to provide offensive support to 16th Air Assault Brigade.

In May 2013, V Battery was disbanded.

In September 2013, the regiment was part of Exercise Sphinx Resolve.

Following the Army 2020 Refine, the Honourable Artillery Company formed A (1st City of London) Battery, The Honourable Artillery Company to provide a reserve element for 7 Para RHA. This battery is co-located with RHQ HAC at Finsbury Barracks.

In August 2021, members of the Regiment (held at high readiness), deployed to Kabul in Afghanistan on Operation Pitting. This was to aid in the extraction of British Nationals, following the rapid Taliban advance across the country and into the city. Over 15,000 eligible Afghans and British Nationals successfully evacuated, in an operation that marked the end of the UK’s 20-year military campaign in Afghanistan.

Under the Future Soldier Programme (from July 2023), the regiment remains under the renamed 16th Air Assault Brigade Combat Team. The regiment's role remains the same, however the regiment's overall structure and strength has expanded. I Parachute Battery (Bull's Troop) re-roles as a Light Gun battery, identical to F (Sphinx) Parachute Battery and G Parachute Battery (Mercer’s Troop). H Battery (Ramsay's Troop) are reformed from suspended animation to take the role of Headquarters Battery in the form of H Parachute Headquarters Battery (Ramsay's Troop). In addition, N Parachute Battery (The Eagle Troop) have joined the regiment to act as a Tactical Group Battery.

== Organisation ==
As of May 2023, the regiment is organised as follows:

- Regimental Headquarters
- F (Sphinx) Parachute Battery Royal Horse Artillery — Gun Battery 6 x L118 105mm light guns
- G Parachute Battery (Mercer's Troop) Royal Horse Artillery — Gun Battery 6 x L118 105mm light guns
- H Battery (Ramsay's Troop) Royal Horse Artillery - Headquarters Battery
- I Parachute Battery (Bull's Troop) Royal Horse Artillery — Gun Battery 6 x L118 105mm light guns
- N Battery (The Eagle Troop) Royal Horse Artillery — Tactical Group Battery

Reserve reinforcement

- A Battery, Honourable Artillery Company — Gun Battery 6 x L118 105mm light guns
