= 131 Commando Squadron Royal Engineers =

131 Commando Squadron
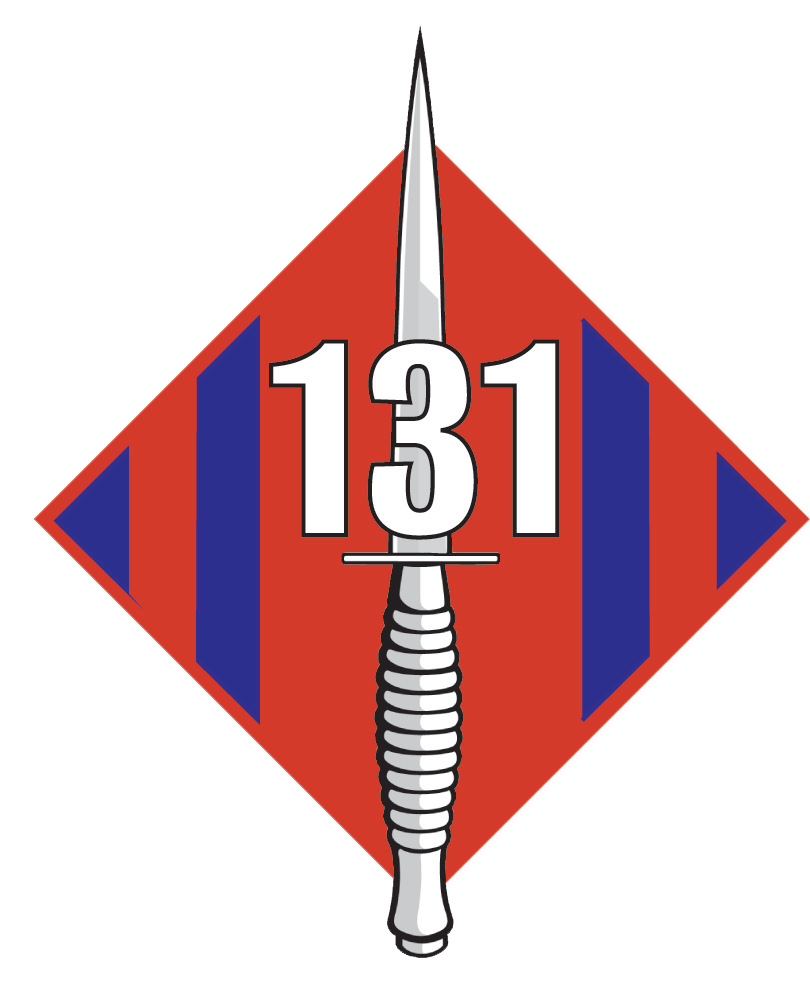
- 131 Cdo Sqn emblem
- Active: 1947–present
- Country: United Kingdom
- Branch: British Army
- Role: Engineer support
- Part of: 24 Commando Engineer Regiment
- Garrison/HQ: Lonergan Lines

131 Commando Squadron Royal Engineers is an Army Reserve although termed as a full time reserve unit and part of 24 Commando Regiment Royal Engineers. It provides engineering support to UK Commando Force (3 Cdo Bde RM) and is the largest Army Reserve Commando unit. The squadron has deployed worldwide to provide combat engineer support to the UKCF, often deploying in small sub-units. 131 was first raised in 1947 as an airborne engineer regiment, and reached a strength of over 1,000 trained parachute engineers by the early 1960s. Between 1 April 1978 and 1 October 2015, the unit was an independent Commando squadron under operational command of HQ 3 Cdo Bde RM. On 2 October 2015, it formally became the third squadron of 24 Commando Engineer Regiment.

== History ==
=== 1940s: Airborne Forces Role ===
With the reformation of the Territorial Army (TA) in 1947, the unit was raised as 131 Airborne Engineer Regiment in support of 16th Airborne Division. The division, taking its number from the wartime 1st and 6th Airborne Divisions, was commanded at first by Major-General Roy Urquhart (who had led 1st Airborne Division at Arnhem in 1944) and consisted of three TA parachute brigades (44, 45 and 46 Parachute Brigades), each of three parachute battalions.

With all volunteers going through 'P Company' to gain their Maroon Berets and earning their Parachute Wings at RAF Abingdon, the regiment provided a squadron of parachute engineers to support each brigade: 299 Airborne Field Squadron in Hull; 300 Airborne Field Squadron in Liverpool, later Glasgow; and 301 Airborne Field Squadron in Croydon. The regimental headquarters was in Pont Street in Knightsbridge, with 302 Airborne Field Park Squadron based in Hendon. Manning a regiment of this size presented no problems, with many recently demobilised World War II soldiers, including many former paratroopers, willing to join the regiment. Indeed, it was one of the fullest of all units within the brigade. Experienced leadership was also readily available. 299 Squadron was raised by Major George Widdowson, previously of the Green Howards, who had fought at Arnhem as second-in-command of the decimated 10th Battalion, Parachute Regiment, whilst at Surrey-based 301 Squadron Major Beverley Holloway became Officer Commanding and later regimental second-in-command. His World War II service included parachuting into Normandy on D Day as a troop commander with 3rd Parachute Squadron RE.

=== 1950s ===
Territorial Army reorganisations took place in 1956, with 16 Airborne Division being disbanded and replaced by a single TA parachute brigade, 44 Independent Parachute Brigade Group. 131 Regiment was sufficiently well established to ensure that it was retained in size but redesignated as 131 Parachute Engineer Regiment, with all squadron titles replacing the term "Airborne" with "Parachute". RHQ moved half a mile to the Duke of York's Headquarters in the King's Road, Chelsea, co-located with Brigade Headquarters. Troop locations evolved through the 1950s too, with 301 Squadron moving to Guildford and gaining a Birmingham based troop as a result of the demise of 18th Battalion The Parachute Regiment. The Liverpool-based troop also went on to become part of 299 Squadron, whilst 300 Squadron, gained troops in Edinburgh and Falkirk to become wholly Scottish. One final change saw 302 Squadron move from Hendon to nearby Kingsbury, with its Luton-based Plant Troop also relocating to Kingsbury, in 1959.

=== 1960s ===
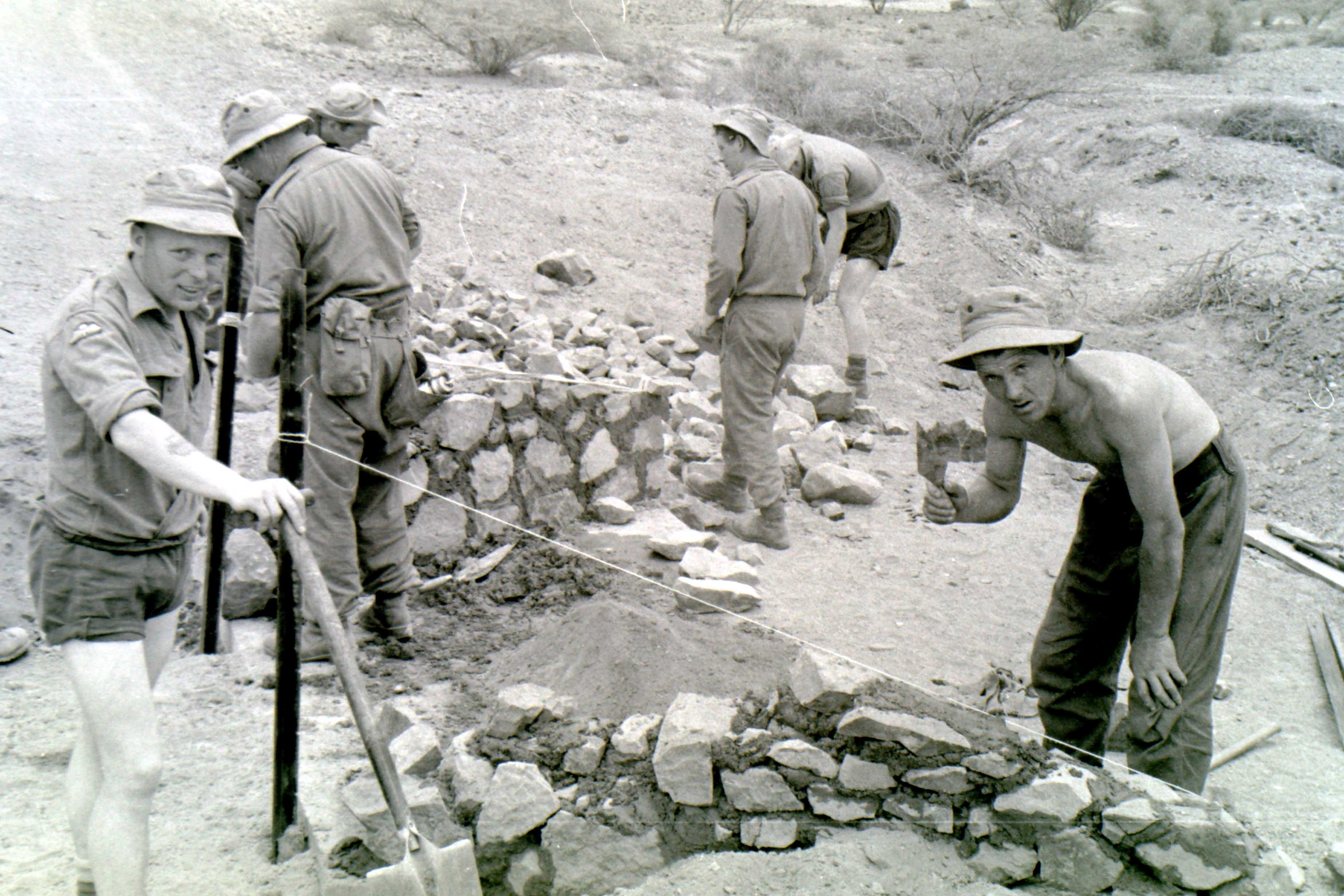
Culvert construction on the Dhala Road by 131 Parachute Engineer Regiment

In the early 1960s, 131 fielded over 1,000 trained parachute engineers and was believed to have the largest number of men earning their annual bounty in the whole of the Territorial Army. Many of the unit's members were also members of the Emergency Reserve, giving them a higher call-out obligation. Basic training was only beginning to be introduced because, up until this time, almost all unit members were either ex-regulars, ex-WW2 volunteers or ex-National Servicemen. Throughout this period of the regiment's existence, squadron-sized detachments served their annual camps in many overseas theatres, carrying out close support and construction engineer tasks as well as parachuting with United States, Canadian, French and Italian forces. A major regimental event during the 1960s was Exercise Sea Splash, during which its soldiers would parachute into the harbour in St Peter Port in Guernsey, awaited by a fleet of small boats and cheering islanders. 131's first Honorary Colonel, Lieutenant General Sir Philip Neame VC, KBE, CB, DSO, had initiated the regiment's involvement with the island when he served as its governor after the war, and the parachute foray was always treated as a celebration of the liberation from German control in 1945.

In 1965, the bulk of the regiment carried out its Annual Camp in Aden Protectorate and in 1966 elements of the regiment deployed to the country again. During the 1965 deployment ('Ex Jockey Club') on the night of 12 April, 300 Parachute Squadron was attacked by guerrillas whilst working with 24 Field Squadron on the construction of the Dhala Road at Al-Milah near the Yemen frontier. Squadron Sergeant Major John Lonergan of 300 Squadron and Sergeant Atfield, the pay sergeant of 24 Field Squadron, were both killed during the action and are buried at the Ma-Allah Cemetery, now within the Republic of Yemen. Major Clive Samuel, the Regimental Medical Officer, was awarded the MBE for gallantry after he risked his life to attend to those wounded and rescued two badly wounded men caught out in the open. The incident became known as the Battle of Dhala. 131 Commando Squadron Royal Engineers's base is named Lonergan Lines in honour of SSM Lonergan.

The second major post-war reorganisation of the TA in 1967 saw the regiment reduced to a single independent squadron of 250 personnel on 1 April 1967. 131 Independent Parachute Squadron Royal Engineers (Volunteers) maintained its role in support of the three parachute battalions of 44 Parachute Brigade (Volunteers). Squadron Headquarters and the Support Troop was based in Kingsbury in London, with Troops in Birmingham, Hull and Grangemouth. Troops took the names of the Squadrons they had replaced, with 299 Troop in Hull, 300 Troop in Grangemouth, 301 Troop in Birmingham and 302 Troop (Support Troop) in Kingsbury.

=== 1970s ===
The three field troops each continued to support a TA parachute battalion, with 299 Troop linked to the 4th (Volunteer) Battalion The Parachute Regiment, 300 Troop to the 15th (Scottish Volunteer) Battalion and 301 Troop to the 10th (Volunteer) Battalion. Overseas travel, with associated opportunities for engineer support, construction and parachuting continued. At times, troops carried out annual camps in direct support of their battalions, such as 299 Troop's 1972 camp with 4 Para in Jamaica, whilst on other occasions the squadron exercised as a whole. In 1973, the squadron undertook Exercise Sacristan in the United Arab Emirates, which saw 180 members of the squadron deploy for between two and six weeks, carrying out a variety of construction tasks and desert training exercises. Close ties with 9 Independent Parachute Squadron RE, then based at Church Crookham, also continued throughout the period.

On 28 September 1975, during Exercise Trent Chase, while the squadron was conducting its annual watermanship-based section competition on the River Trent in Nottinghamshire, an assault boat containing eleven Sappers of 300 Troop was swept over the Cromwell Weir near Newark. Ten of the eleven men were drowned, including two brothers, Sappers Stuart and Peter Evenden. After the military funerals, which took place in various parishes around Scotland, a memorial service was held at the site of the accident, and a stone of Scottish granite bearing the names of those killed was laid in a small commemorative garden close to the lock. Another memorial was established near Grangemouth, at Falkirk Cemetery, and the men are also commemorated at the National Memorial Arboretum in Staffordshire. A bridge over the River Toscaig was built in their memory in 1996 at Toscaig near Applecross in Wester Ross.

=== 1978: Commando Role ===
In 1977, reductions in the regular and TA Airborne Forces were announced and, on 31 March 1978, 44 Parachute Brigade (Volunteers) was disbanded in a parade at Altcar Ranges, near Liverpool. Although the three parachute battalions were retained, support arms and services were to be disbanded. On 1 April 1978, the squadron was accepted into the order of battle of 3 Commando Brigade Royal Marines. Exchanging Maroon Berets for Green, but retaining a significant parachute capability across its four locations, it was renamed 131 Independent Commando Squadron Royal Engineers (Volunteers).

=== 1980s and 1990s ===
In 1982, it was decided to raise a field troop in Plymouth to capitalise on the significant number of ex-regular Commando-trained personnel living in the area and the fact that 131's new sister-Squadron, 59 Independent Commando Squadron RE, was based within the town at Crownhill Fort (later Seaton Barracks). This sub-unit was to become the new 300 Troop, but whilst Grangemouth and Plymouth were both on the Squadron's order of battle, Plymouth used the old Support Troop number, 302 Troop, for a year. Recruiting at Plymouth was buoyant, and the then-Permanent Staff Instructor was awarded the British Empire Medal for his leadership in helping to establish the new Troop. Finally, in 1983, at a ceremony in Grangemouth, the Scottish 300 Troop was re-roled as a Royal Marines Reserve Assault Engineer Troop, and Plymouth took on the 300 Troop title.

=== 21st Century ===
2001's annual training exercise took place in Oman (Ex Saif Sareea), setting the tone for more than a decade of operational activity by the squadron in the Middle East and Afghanistan. Fourteen personnel mobilised for service in Afghanistan with 3 Cdo Bde RM the following year (Op Jacana). The squadron was compulsorily mobilised in January 2003 and deployed in Iraq as part of Operation TELIC 1, returning to the UK in May. A significant proportion of the unit was mobilised for a second time in Autumn 2006 for service in Helmand Province in Afghanistan. Following the end of this deployment in Spring 2007, the squadron has supported a further nine tours of the province. Tasks and responsibilities were wide and varied as befits the extensive range of skills held within the unit, ranging from reconstruction advice through to close support engineering by sections embedded within Royal Marines rifle companies. Small teams also deployed to Iraq on Operation TELIC 4 in 2004/5 and to the Bagh region of Pakistan during humanitarian operations (Op Maturin) following the Kashmir earthquake in 2005.

During 2006, the squadron effectively split in two to form 299 Parachute Squadron, centred on the very strongly recruited Hull-based 299 Troop, whilst retaining the three other locations within 131 and growing a new troop in Bath (302 Troop).

On 2 October 2015, 131 formally became the third squadron of 24 Commando Engineer Regiment. The Squadron retained the three previous field troop locations and Squadron Headquarters at Kingsbury.

== Current role ==
As a Commando unit, the majority of the squadron's personnel have completed the Reserve Forces Commando Course, run by the Royal Marines at the Commando Training Centre at Lympstone. This demanding course is the foundation for all further training. As an engineer unit, the squadron trains for a variety of tasks from demolitions to construction.

== Structure ==
The squadron consists of three troops based in the following locations around the UK:

- Headquarters and Support Troop (Kingsbury in North West London) – recruiting from London and the South East
- 301 Troop (Sheldon in Birmingham)
- 302 Troop (Bath) – recruiting from Bristol, Bath, South Wales and the M4/M5 corridors

The Plymouth-based 300 Troop, recruiting from Devon and Cornwall, was disbanded in October 2021. They were replaced by the Royal Monmouthshire Royal Engineers (Royal Mons)) at the same location.

The Hull-based 299 Troop, which was part of 131 until 2007, later become the heart of the re-formed 299 Parachute Squadron.

== See also ==
- British Army
- Royal Engineers
- UK Commando Force
