= 3rd Battalion, Parachute Regiment =

3rd Battalion, the Parachute Regiment
- Cap badge of the Parachute Regiment
- Active: 1941—1948; 1948—present
- Country: United Kingdom
- Branch: British Army
- Type: Airborne Forces
- Role: Air Assault; Light Infantry
- Size: Battalion
- Part of: Parachute Regiment; 16 Air Assault Brigade
- Garrison/HQ: Colchester Garrison
- Nickname: Gungy Third
- Mottos: Utrinque Paratus (Latin for "Ready for Anything")
- Engagements: World War II; Tunisian Campaign; Invasion of Sicily; Invasion of Italy; Battle of Arnhem; Suez Crisis; Operation Telescope; Falklands War; Battle of Mount Longdon; The Troubles; Iraq War; Afghanistan War; Operation Herrick IV; Operation Herrick VIII; Operation Herrick XIII

Commanders
- Notable commanders: Sir Gerald Lathbury; Richard Lonsdale

Insignia
- Drop zone flash

The 3rd Battalion, Parachute Regiment (3 PARA) is a battalion of the Parachute Regiment, within the British Army and forms part of 16th Air Assault Brigade.

The battalion is based at Merville Barracks, Colchester Garrison, England, and is trained for rapid deployment by parachute or air assault to conduct high‑readiness operations across a range of environments. 3 PARA regularly undertakes operational deployments and multinational exercises overseas. The battalion includes the Guards Parachute Platoon (6 Guards Platoon) in B Company, composed of volunteers from the five regiments of Foot Guards and infantry‑qualified Household Cavalry who have completed the Parachute Regiment selection course. Guards paratroopers can be distinguished by a "blue-red-blue" patch sewn beneath the Parachute Regiment cap badge on the maroon beret.

== History ==
=== Formation ===
3 PARA was formed in September 1941 from volunteers drawn from across the British Army at Hardwick Hall, Derbyshire, under the command of Lieutenant‑Colonel Gerald W. Lathbury. After intensive training, including parachute instruction at No. 1 Parachute Training School, RAF Ringway, the battalion deployed with the 1st Parachute Brigade of the 1st Airborne Division.

=== North Africa and Italy ===
The battalion’s first airborne operation took place on 12 November 1942 during the North African campaign, when 3 PARA conducted a parachute assault on the airfield at Bone, Tunisia. This marked the first British Army battalion‑level parachute operation. The drop was executed with relatively light opposition, though several aircraft were damaged by flak and some paratroopers landed off‑target. After securing the airfield, 3 PARA fought alongside conventional forces as line infantry, participating in actions to capture surrounding towns, clear German positions, and secure key routes across the Tunisian theatre. The battalion’s operations continued until the final surrender of Axis forces in Tunisia in May 1943.

In July 1943, 3 PARA took part in Operation Fustian, the airborne assault on Primosole Bridge in Sicily. The battalion’s objectives were to capture and hold the bridge to allow the advance of the British Eighth Army. The drops were widely scattered due to anti-aircraft fire and navigational difficulties, causing platoons and companies to operate independently or in small groups. Despite heavy German resistance, including elements of the Hermann Göring Division, 3 PARA fought through roads, orchards, and defensive positions, eventually securing the bridge and holding it until relieved by advancing ground forces from the Eighth Army. Casualties were significant, with several officers and senior NCOs killed or wounded during the initial landing and consolidation.

Following the Sicilian campaign, 3 PARA moved to the Italian mainland in Operation Slapstick, landing at Taranto on 9 September 1943. Unlike Fustian, this amphibious operation faced minimal opposition, allowing the battalion to quickly disembark and begin a rapid advance along the Adriatic coast, securing ports, road junctions, and towns. 3 PARA’s units provided security for supply lines and engaged in sporadic skirmishes with German rearguard forces as the Allied advance continued northward.

=== Operation Market Garden ===
On 17 September 1944, 3 PARA parachuted into the Netherlands as part of Operation Market Garden, forming part of the 1st Parachute Brigade, 1st Airborne Division. The battalion’s assigned drop zones were around Renkum, Oosterbeek, and Heveadorp/Wolfheze, south and west of Arnhem. Heavy German flak, navigational errors, and scattered landings caused many paratroopers to arrive far from their intended objectives, forcing small groups to operate independently.

3 PARA’s operational orders were to secure the drop zones, clear surrounding areas of German forces, and support the brigade’s advance along central routes toward Arnhem. Upon landing, the battalion immediately engaged German infantry and armored reconnaissance units, secured road junctions, and attempted to protect key crossroads near Arnhem. Coordination with neighboring units was severely hampered by dispersed drops and rapid German counterattacks.

As the battalion advanced along the ‘Tiger’ route, it encountered significant opposition from elements of the 9th SS Panzer Division Hohenstaufen, including reconnaissance troops, infantry, and armored units. These forces delayed 3 PARA’s movement and inflicted casualties, forcing isolated platoons and companies to conduct defensive actions in houses, factories, and roadblocks under fire from machine guns, mortars, artillery, and tanks.

Lieutenant‑Colonel John A. C. Fitch, commanding the battalion, ordered C Company to detach north toward the railway line in an attempt to flank German defenses. This unit became the only part of the 3 PARA to reach the Arnhem road bridge itself, although they were not part of the main bridge assault. Fitch’s headquarters and the rest of the battalion established positions around Oosterbeek, particularly along the Utrechtseweg and the area surrounding the Hartenstein Hotel, and engaged in repeated ad hoc defensive and covering actions as German pressure increased.

Over the next nine days, the battalion continued fighting in fragmented and isolated groups, attempting to support other elements of the 1st Parachute Brigade and to hold routes toward the bridge. Despite repeated attempts, the battalion was unable to consolidate or secure the Arnhem road bridge. German opposition, including machine gun nests, mortars, and Panzer units from the 9th SS, inflicted heavy casualties and eventually forced 3 PARA into partial withdrawals and defensive positions. Lieutenant‑Colonel Fitch was killed by a mortar while directing his remaining men, leaving the battalion largely reduced to small, disorganized groups. Survivors were either evacuated across the Lower Rhine or captured.

=== Disbandment ===
At the end of the war, remnants of 3 PARA and 2 PARA were combined to form the 2/3rd Parachute Battalion in Palestine. That formation was disbanded in June 1948 and a new 3 PARA was reconstituted by redesignating the 7th (Light Infantry) Parachute Battalion at Itzehoe, Germany, later that month.

=== Suez Crisis ===
In the early 1950s, 3 PARA conducted internal security operations in the Suez Canal Zone (Egypt) before deploying on anti‑EOKA operations in Cyprus in 1956, where it conducted counter‑terrorism actions including the arrest of Archbishop Makarios.

On 5 November 1956, during the Suez Crisis, 3 PARA, part of the 16th Independent Parachute Brigade, conducted the last full-battalion-sized operational parachute assault in British military history. This airborne operation, known as Operation Telescope, formed a key element of the broader Anglo-French Operation Musketeer, aimed at seizing control of the northern entrance to the Suez Canal following its nationalization by Egyptian President Gamal Abdel Nasser.

The assault targeted El Gamil airfield, a small coastal airstrip located on a narrow spit of land west of Port Said, between the Mediterranean Sea and Lake Manzala. The objective was to secure the airfield as a forward operating base and landing strip to support follow-on forces and supplies ahead of the main amphibious landings.

At approximately 05:15 GMT, 668 paratroopers from 3 PARA—commanded by Lieutenant Colonel Paul Crook—along with attached personnel including elements of 33rd (Para) Royal Artillery, jumped from a fleet of 18 Valetta and 7 Hastings transport aircraft based in Cyprus. The drop occurred under intense enemy fire from Egyptian defenders, including small arms, machine guns, and anti-aircraft weapons. Despite the "hot drop," the battalion rallied quickly upon landing. The initial wave, led by A Company, secured the airfield itself within about 30 minutes, with many Egyptian troops killed, wounded, or captured.

Following the capture of the runway and facilities, 3 PARA advanced eastward toward Port Said in close-quarters combat through difficult terrain, including a sewage farm and a cemetery. The paratroopers rolled up Egyptian coastal defense positions, neutralized threats such as at least one SU-100 tank destroyer, and held their objectives against counterattacks. By around 13:00, they had dug in to await the amphibious assault by Royal Marines and other units on 6 November.

The operation inflicted a decisive local defeat on the Egyptian forces at El Gamil. British casualties for 3 PARA during the airborne phase and immediate follow-on actions were relatively light: 4 killed and approximately 29–32 wounded (including three officers). This compared to heavier Egyptian losses in the engagement. The capture of the airfield enabled rapid reinforcement by air-landed troops and proved critical to the initial success of the broader operation in Port Said.

This event remains notable as the final large-scale battalion parachute assault by British forces, with no subsequent operational drops of comparable size. Later British airborne operations have relied primarily on air-landing or helicopter insertion. The Suez intervention ultimately concluded with a ceasefire on 6–7 November under intense international pressure, leading to the withdrawal of Anglo-French forces by late December 1956.

=== Middle East Operations ===
In 1958, 3 PARA formed part of an air‑landed intervention force to Amman, Jordan, to counter an Egyptian/Iraqi threat. This was followed by internal security tours in Bahrain (1961–62 and 1964–65), and counter‑insurgency operations in the Radfan Mountains north of Aden in 1964.

In 1965, the battalion deployed to British Guiana to assist in preparations for independence, and in 1968–1970 it performed resident duties in Malta covering the withdrawal of British forces from Libya, conducting NATO exercises in Greece during that period.

=== Northern Ireland and Cyprus ===
3 PARA’s first Operation Banner deployment to Northern Ireland began in January 1971. Over the next three decades, the battalion completed twelve operational tours between 1971 and September 2004, amounting to more than 80 months of active service. Deployments took place in volatile areas such as South County Armagh, Belfast, and other hotspots, where the battalion performed urban and rural security patrols, checkpoints, and counter‑terrorism operations.

During the first tour, Sergeant Michael Willetts was posthumously awarded the George Cross for gallantry.

Between these tours, 3 PARA also undertook a UN peacekeeping tour in Cyprus (May–October 1972).

=== Falklands War ===
In 1982, at the outbreak of the Falklands Conflict (Operation Corporate), 3 PARA was attached to 3 Commando Brigade and deployed to the South Atlantic. Landing near Port San Carlos, the battalion marched across East Falkland and engaged Argentine forces. It fought in the Battle of Mount Longdon on 11–12 June, a fierce night battle resulting in heavy casualties and ultimately the capture of the objective. Among those killed was Sergeant Ian McKay, who was posthumously awarded the Victoria Cross for his leadership and bravery. 3 PARA was among the first British units to enter Port Stanley following the Argentine surrender.

In the mid‑1980s, the battalion completed tours in Belize (1984) and another United Nations mission in Cyprus (1986), followed by an extended Northern Ireland tour (1989–1991). It later took on the Army’s Mountain and Arctic Warfare role, including winters training in Norway.

=== Iraq ===
After the restructuring of British forces into the 16th Air Assault Brigade, 3 PARA was part of the coalition invasion of Iraq in 2003 (Operation Telic). It crossed into southern Iraq on 21 March, securing the Rumaylah and West Qurnah oil fields and later entered Basra with 7th Armoured Brigade. Following this, the battalion deployed to Maysan Province to secure the southern area before departing in May 2003.

=== Afghanistan ===
In 2006, 3 PARA formed the nucleus of a roughly 1,200‑strong all‑arms battle group under Operation Herrick in Helmand Province. Its mission included protecting local communities and key terrain from Taliban insurgents.

During this deployment, the Kajaki Dam incident occurred on 6 September 2006, when four Soviet‑era anti‑personnel mines were detonated by members of 3 PARA near a forward position. One soldier was fatally wounded and seven sustained serious injuries.

In the same tour, Corporal Bryan James Budd was posthumously awarded the Victoria Cross for “inspirational leadership and supreme valour” during heavy fighting in July–August 2006, marking one of the highest recognitions for battlefield gallantry by a member of the battalion.

3 PARA elements later participated in subsequent Afghan tours, including deployments in 2008 and 2010–2011, continuing combat and security operations as part of coalition forces.

=== Post‑Telic/Herrick ===
In October 2013, 3 PARA took part in large training exercises designed to re‑establish its airborne and air assault role within the brigade. From May 2014, the battalion trained to meet the requirements of the Air Assault Task Force (AATF) construct.

In 2018, over 60 members of 3 PARA deployed as part of the Resolute Support Mission in Afghanistan to protect and advise military and civilian authorities, including at the Afghan National Army Officers’ Academy.

== See also ==
- 1st Battalion, Parachute Regiment
- 2nd Battalion, Parachute Regiment
- 4th Battalion, Parachute Regiment
- List of Second World War British airborne battalions
