= DZ Flash =

Military insignia

A DZ Flash is a badge or patch worn by the Airborne forces of the British Army and all squadrons of the RAF Regiment. DZ stands for 'drop zone'. In RAF Regiment use, these flashes distinguish between squadrons, although within the RAF Regiment only II Squadron has a parachute capability.

The DZ flash should not be confused with the smaller Tactical Recognition Flash (TRF) introduced and used by the rest of the Army.

== Army ==
=== Current ===
Parachute Regiment
HQ, Parachute Regiment	1st Battalion, Parachute Regiment	2nd Battalion, Parachute Regiment	3rd Battalion, Parachute Regiment	4th Battalion, Parachute Regiment
Depot, Parachute Regiment and Airborne Forces
Other units of the 16th Air Assault Brigade
7 Parachute Royal Horse Artillery	23 Parachute Engineer Regiment	13 Air Assault Regiment Royal Logistics Corps	16 Medical Regiment	EOD Troop 33 Regiment Royal Engineers
			The new DZ Flash of the 16th medical regiment.	
Brigade HQ	Brigade Pathfinder Platoon	216 Parachute Signals Squadron	8 Field Company Royal Electrical and Mechanical Engineers	156 Provost Company Royal Military Police
A (1st City of London) Battery, Honourable Artillery Company

=== Inactive ===
10th Battalion, Parachute Regiment	15th (Scottish) Parachute Battalion	9 Parachute Squadron, Royal Engineers	D Squadron, Household Cavalry Regiment

== Air Force ==
No. 2 Squadron RAF Regiment

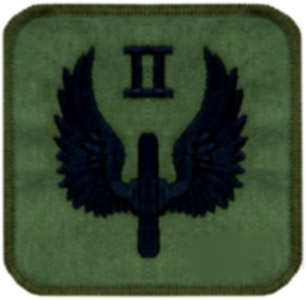
