= James Chiswell =

Former British Army officer

Major General James Chiswell CB CBE MC
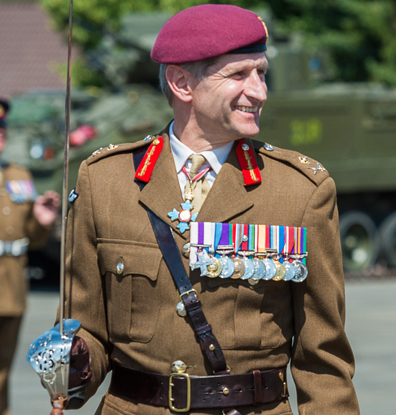
- Major General Chiswell in 2014
- Born: 29 March 1964 (age 62); Berlin, Germany
- Spouse: Linda Metcalf (m. 2006)
- Military career
- Allegiance: United Kingdom
- Branch: British Army
- Service years: 1983–2018
- Rank: Major General
- Service number: 515950
- Commands: United Kingdom Special Forces; 1st (UK) Armoured Division; 16 Air Assault Brigade; 2nd Battalion, Parachute Regiment
- Conflicts: Sierra Leone Civil War; War in Afghanistan; Iraq War
- Awards: Companion of the Order of the Bath; Commander of the Order of the British Empire; Military Cross

Major General James Robert Chiswell, CB, CBE, MC (born 29 March 1964) is a former British Army officer.

== Early life and education ==
Born in Berlin to Major General Peter Chiswell, James Chiswell was educated at Allhallows College and King's College London.

== Military career ==
Chiswell was commissioned into the Parachute Regiment in 1983. He took part in Operation Barras in Sierra Leone in September 2000 for which he was awarded the Military Cross (MC).

Chiswell became Commanding officer of 2nd Battalion, Parachute Regiment in 2004 and led his battalion in Iraq. He was then sent to Permanent Joint Headquarters, Northwood as Assistant Chief of Staff with responsibility for current operations. He went on to be Liaison Officer to the Joint Chiefs of Staff in Washington, D.C. in 2008 and Commander of 16 Air Assault Brigade in December 2008 seeing service as Commander Task Force Helmand when the brigade was deployed to Afghanistan in October 2010. Chiswell was appointed Commander of the Order of the British Empire (CBE) in September 2011 in recognition of his service in Afghanistan. He became General Officer Commanding 1st Armoured Division in October 2012 and Director Special Forces in 2015. Chiswell was appointed Companion of the Order of the Bath (CB) in the 2018 Birthday Honours. Chiswell retired from the British Army on 22 September 2018.

== Personal life ==
Chiswell married Linda Metcalf in 2006; they have one son and a daughter.

== Honours and awards ==
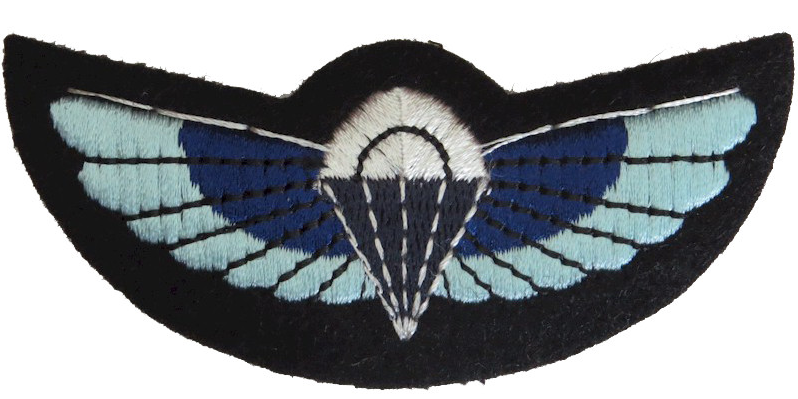

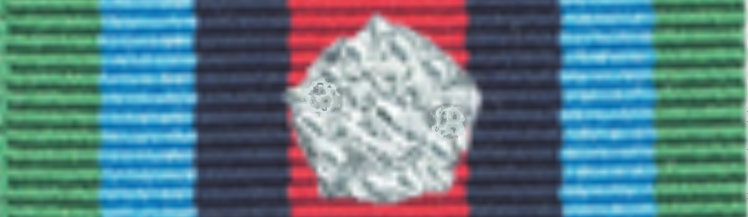

Ribbon	Description	Notes
	Commander of the Order of the Bath	Appointed in 2018
	Commander of the Order of the British Empire	Appointed in 2011
	Military Cross	Awarded in 2000
	UN Mission in Cyprus	
	General Service Medal (1962)	
	UN Mission in the Former Yugoslavia	
	Operational Service Medal for Sierra Leone	With Bar
	Iraq Medal (United Kingdom)	
	Operational Service Medal for Afghanistan	
	Queen Elizabeth II Golden Jubilee Medal	
	Queen Elizabeth II Diamond Jubilee Medal	
	Accumulated Campaign Service Medal	

Military offices
Preceded by James Bashall	General Officer Commanding 1st (UK) Armoured Division; 2012–2015	Succeeded by Giles Hill
Preceded by Mark Carleton-Smith	Director Special Forces; 2015–2018	Succeeded by Roland Walker
