= Battle of Dhala =

- Part of Aden Emergency
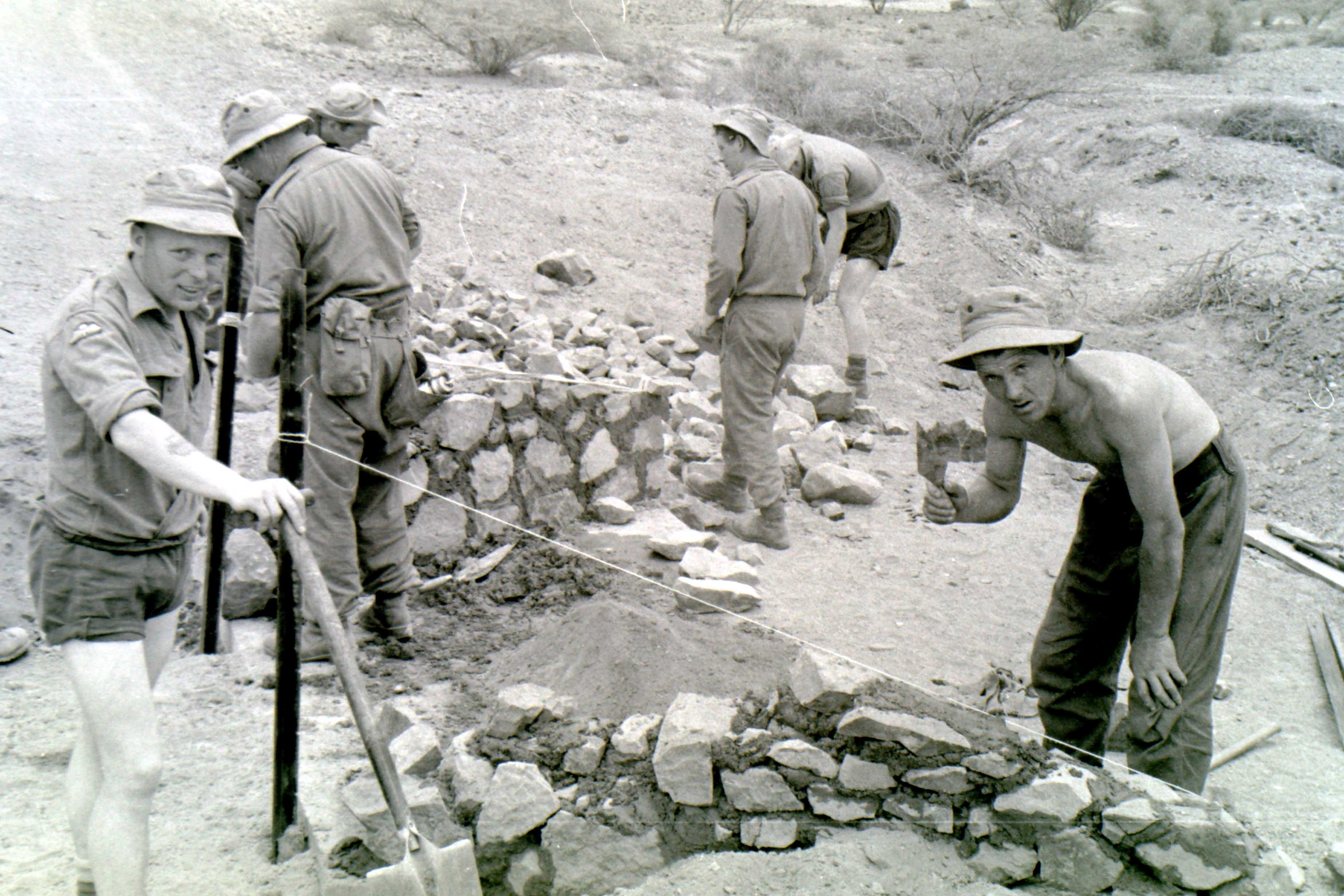
- Culvert construction on the Dhala Road by Territorial Army Sappers of 131 Parachute Engineer Regiment in April 1965
Date	20 March 1965
Location	Dhala
Result	NLF victory

Belligerents
United Kingdom; Emirate of Dhala	(Yemen) NLF; FLOSY

Commanders and leaders
(United Kingdom) Unknown	Unknown

Strength
Federal Regular Army	Guerrilla fighters

Casualties and losses
3 killed 4 wounded	Unknown

The Battle of Dhala took place in March 1965 during the Aden Emergency.

== Battle ==
On the night of 12 April, 300 Parachute Squadron of 131 Parachute Engineer Regiment (Territorial Army) was attacked by guerrillas whilst working with 24 Field Squadron on the construction of the Dhala Road at Al-Milah near the Yemen frontier. Squadron Sergeant Major (SSM) John Lonergan of 300 Squadron and Sergeant Atfield, the pay sergeant of 24 Field Squadron, were both killed during the action and are buried at the Ma-Allah Cemetery, now within the Republic of Yemen. Major Clive Samuel, the Regimental Medical Officer, was awarded the MBE for gallantry after he risked his life to attend to those wounded and rescued two badly wounded men caught out in the open. He had been recommended for the award of the Military Cross.

The base of 131 Engineer Regiment's successor unit, 131 Commando Squadron Royal Engineers, is named Lonergan Lines in honour of SSM Lonergan, believed to be the first Territorial Army soldier killed in action since the Second World War.
