= Colchester Garrison =

Military installation in Essex, England

Coordinates: 51.88451°N 0.90154°E

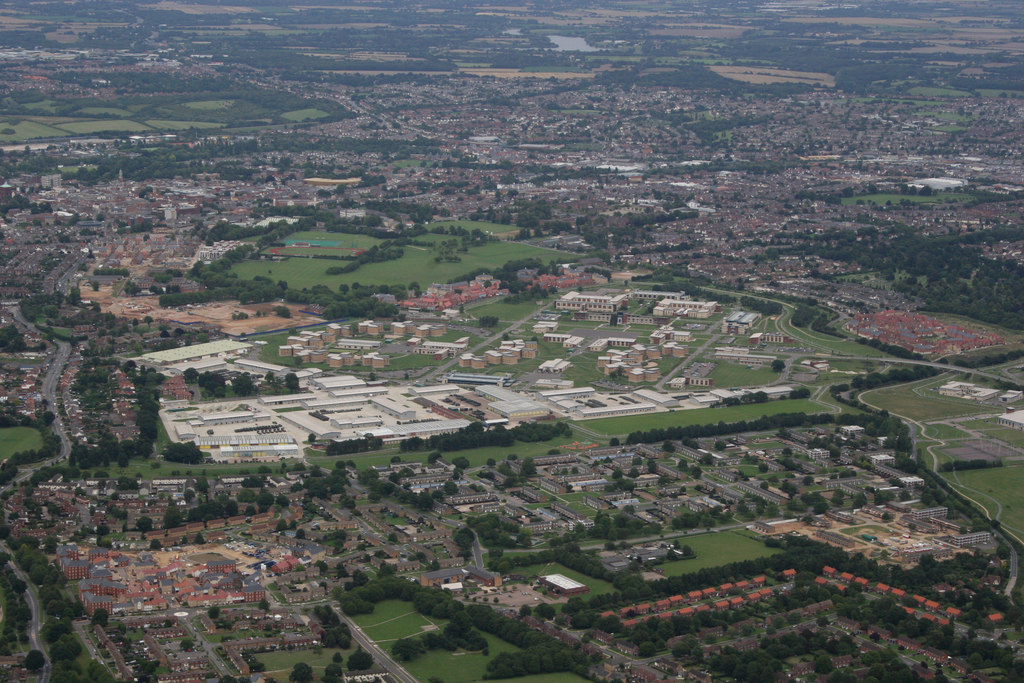
- Colchester Garrison from above

- Location within Essex
- OS grid reference: TL997254
- District: Colchester
- Shire county: Essex
- Region: East
- Country: England
- Sovereign state: United Kingdom
- Post town: COLCHESTER
- Postcode district: CO1 – CO16
- Dialling code: 01206
- Police: Essex
- Fire: Essex
- Ambulance: East of England
- UK Parliament: Colchester

Colchester Garrison is a major garrison located in Colchester in the county of Essex, eastern England. It has been an important military base since the Roman era. The first permanent military garrison in Colchester was established by Legio XX Valeria Victrix in AD 43, following the Roman conquest of Britain. Colchester was an important garrison town during the Napoleonic Wars and throughout the Victorian era. During the First World War, several battalions of Kitchener's Army were trained there.

Today, Colchester Garrison is most known for being home to the Parachute Regiment, known as "The Paras".

== History ==
=== Napoleonic Wars (1792–1815) ===
Colchester Garrison played an eminent role during the Napoleonic Wars. The troops were originally billeted in local inns and houses. After petitioning from the borough council, new infantry barracks were built in 1794. By 1800 additional infantry, artillery, and cavalry barracks had been built in the area bounded by Barrack Street to the north, Wimpole Road to the west, and Port Lane to the east. In 1805 the barracks were home to 7,000 officers and men. After the Napoleonic Wars the barracks were reduced. The sale of the older barracks and the freehold site on which they stood started in 1817 and was completed in 1840. The Army retained 14 acres (57,000 m^{2}) and an infantry barracks for 851 officers and men. Much of the old barracks land was developed as the "New Town" area of Colchester during the Victorian era. The south wing of the Military Hospital was purchased by Rev Jefferson and seven other subscribers and rebuilt on a plot of land on Lexden Road as the Essex and County Hospital.

=== Crimean War (1854–1856) ===
Colchester Garrison experienced rapid expansion during the Crimean War. Between 1855 and 1856 wooden infantry barracks for 5,000 troops were erected on Ordnance Field. The government purchased 167-acre (0.68 km^{2}) Middlewick Farm for use as a training area and a rifle range in 1857. Middlewick Ranges were still in use by the garrison until the land was sold in 2024.

==== British German Legion ====
In 1856 10,000 troops of the British German Legion were billeted in the infantry barracks and in tented encampments on Barrack Field. The British German Legion was raised in 1854 as a foreign corps in British service (similar to the Kings German Legion during the Napoleonic Wars). The Legion was raised for service in the Crimean War, under the provisions of the Enlistment of Foreigners Act 1854. The Legion did not see active service although a large number of legionaries went to the Crimea where they mostly died of fever without seeing the battlefields. The Legion was disbanded in Colchester in 1857, but the majority of the remaining personnel went to the Eastern Cape as part of the Kaffraria Settlement. Because preference was given to those who were married or had a fiancée, men without German wives or fiancees married, in great numbers, Colchester girls. There are dozens of marriages recorded in the Colchester Churches, mainly St Botolph's, and the remainder were married at the Garrison Church. This establishment was later found not to be registered for marriages, and so the affected couples were declared wed by Act of the Cape Parliament in 1858.

=== First World War (1914–1918) ===
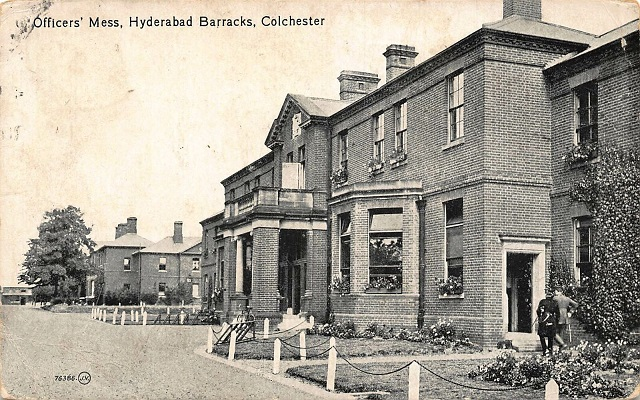
Officers Mess, Hyderabad Barracks, Colchester

==== Territorial Force ====
===== Essex Regiment =====
8th (Cyclist) Battalion, Essex Regiment, (TF) was based in Colchester at the outbreak of war in August 1914. It was redesignated 1/8th Battalion as additional "Terrier" battalions were raised from volunteers during the early months of the war. The 2/8th and 3/8th Battalions were formed in September 1914 and April 1915 respectively. All three Terrier battalions were allocated to home defence and remained in the United Kingdom throughout the war.

===== Essex Yeomanry =====
The Essex Yeomanry (EY), a cavalry regiment, was mobilised at the outbreak of war. The regiment joined the Royal Horse Guards and the 10th Royal Hussars in France in November 1914 as part of 8th Cavalry Brigade, 3rd Cavalry Division. During the war, 2nd and 3rd line regiments were raised in Colchester to reinforce the 1st line. 2 EY served as garrison troops in Ireland during the war, 3 EY was absorbed into the 4th Reserve Cavalry Regiment in 1917.

On 14 March 1918, Essex Yeomanry left 8th Cavalry Brigade to become a cyclist unit, then to form a machine gun battalion with the Bedfordshire Yeomanry. The German spring offensive forestalled this plan, and the regiment was remounted on 28 March and sent to the 1st Cavalry Division. From 4 April it was split up with a squadron joining each regiment in 1st Cavalry Brigade (2nd Dragoon Guards, 5th Dragoon Guards and 11th Hussars).

===== Essex RHA =====
Essex Battery, RHA was mobilised in Colchester and Chelmsford in 1914. The battery was a Territorial Force Royal Horse Artillery unit. A 2nd line unit, 2/1st Essex Battery, RHA, was raised later.

==== Kitchener's Army ====
The 12th (Eastern) Division was organised at Colchester from August 1914 to February 1915. The division was one of the first New Army divisions to be formed, as part of K1. The division included Kitchener battalions from the Essex Regiment, the Suffolk Regiment, the Norfolk Regiment, the Royal Berkshire Regiment, the Cambridgeshire Regiment, the Royal Fusiliers, the Queen's Regiment, The Buffs, the Royal West Kent Regiment, and the East Surrey Regiment. The division moved to France in 1915 and fought at the Battle of Loos (1915), the Battle of the Somme (1916), the Battle of Cambrai (1917) and the Battle of the Hindenburg Line (1918).

=== Second World War (1939–1945) ===
==== 4th Infantry Division ====
Colchester was the home garrison of the 4th Infantry Division in September 1939. Resident units on the outbreak of war on 3 September, included 2nd Battalion Lancashire Fusiliers, 1st Battalion East Surrey Regiment, 1st Battalion Oxfordshire and Buckinghamshire Light Infantry, 5th Royal Inniskilling Dragoon Guards, 17th/21st Lancers, 27th Field Regiment Royal Artillery, 30th Field Regiment Royal Artillery and 14th Anti-Tank Regiment Royal Artillery. The division deployed to France in 1940 as part of the British Expeditionary Force.

==== Home Guard ====
During the war the town was defended by local defence volunteers of 8th Essex Battalion of the Home Guard. At the height of its strength, the battalion mustered over 2,000 men. The battalion possessed no fewer than 22 different types of weapon, including Vickers machine guns, flame throwers, and 2 pounder anti tank guns. Additional support throughout the area was provided by 13th Essex Battalion, made up of volunteers from the GPO who were charged with the protection of critical telecommunications infrastructure.

The order to "stand down" for the Home Guard came on 1 November 1944. They took their final salute on 19 November before the Lord Lieutenant of the county, Colonel Sir Francis Whitmore. Whitmore said, "You have, by your sense of duty, your loyalty and patriotism, contributed pages of tradition to the historical records of our nation... you took a prominent part in the defence of our country at the most critical period of the war... In the name of the County of Essex, I thank you."

==== Colchester Stop Line ====
During the war the town was ringed by over 120 pillboxes or other defensive structures as part of the Colchester Stop Line. A small number of pillboxes can still be found around the borough, such as at Mount Bures, and the Hythe railway station.

==== Colchester Blitz ====
Air raid sirens sounded over 1000 times in Colchester during the course of the war. Colchester was attacked by the Luftwaffe on several occasions. They included:

- Severalls Raid – On 11 August 1942 38 people were killed when a German plane dropped a stick of bombs on Severalls Hospital.
- Chapel Street Raid – 8 people were killed when a Dornier 217 dropped four bombs on South Street and Essex Street on 28 September 1942. The air raid siren, in this case, only sounded after the bombs had already dropped, causing outcry in the town.
- St Botolphs Raid – In February 1944 a large Luftwaffe firebombing raid dropped a stream of 1,400 incendiary bombs on the St Botolphs area of the town, destroying 14 buildings and seriously damaging 99 others. Two-thirds of the Paxman Britannia Works was destroyed during the raid.

Home Guard anti-aircraft batteries were established on Abbey Field and engaged enemy aircraft 14 times during a 21-month period.

==== Americans in Colchester ====
The first American military personnel arrived in Britain in January 1942. A significant American presence was established in the Colchester area, with many air bases of the US Eighth Air Force located in the district – at Earls Colne, Langham, Wormingford, Messing, and Dedham. In accordance with racial segregation of the American military during World War II, the American Red Cross established several social clubs in the area.

==== Post-war ====
Headquarters Eastern District was established at Colchester in 1967, but, after a merger with North East District the enlarged district moved to Imphal Barracks in York in 1992.

A scheme to redevelop the garrison was procured under a Private Finance Initiative contract in 2004. The works, which were designed by Atkins and built by Sir Robert McAlpine at a cost of £540 million, were completed in 2008.

Meanwhile, the older parts of the garrison on Butt Road were demolished between 2014 and 2015 and replaced by flats and houses. With further development set to begin sometime after 2021, the old site is often called the Old Garrison by the local people.

== Colchester Garrison today ==
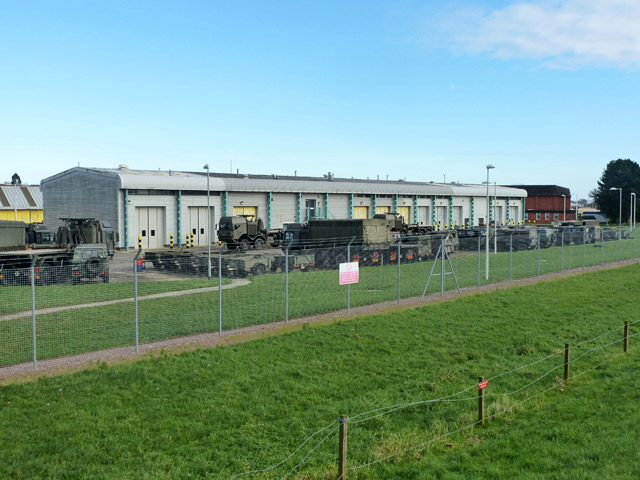
Army vehicles, Colchester Garrison

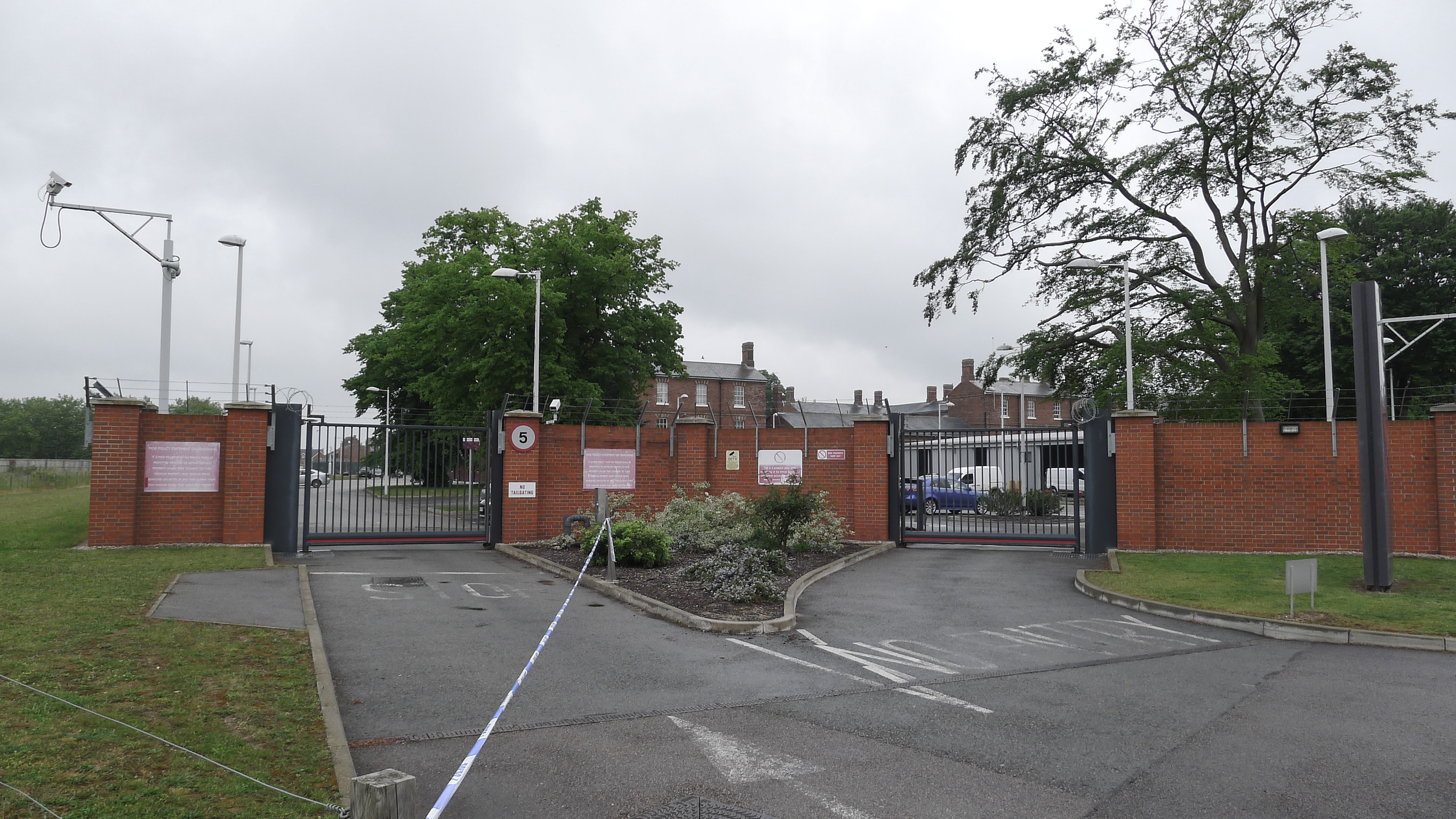
Entrance to Colchester Garrison

=== Regular Army ===
Colchester Garrison is currently home to the British Army's 16th Air Assault Brigade Combat Team. The core role of the BCT is to maintain the Air Assault Task Force, a rapid reaction battlegroup held at very-high readiness to deploy worldwide by parachute, helicopter and air-landing, for a full spectrum of missions, from non-combatant evacuation ops such as Operation Pitting in Afghanistan, 2021, to war fighting.

=== Army Reserve ===
Colchester has a tradition of its citizen volunteers serving in the Army Reserve, formerly known as the Territorial Army. During the Second World War, Colchester's "Terriers" included 2nd/5th Battalion Essex Regiment and 104th Regiment, Royal Horse Artillery (Essex Yeomanry). The Army Reserve is currently represented in Colchester by 161 Squadron 254 Medical Regiment, 36 (Eastern) Signal Squadron, 71 (City of London) Yeomanry Signal Regiment and a troop from 202 Squadron, 158 Regiment RLC.

== Garrison church ==
The old garrison church in Military Road was a former Crimean War era hospital, similar to those shipped in prefabricated sections to Florence Nightingale at Scutari and Balaklava. It was built in 1856 and is the oldest surviving garrison building. The old Garrison Church has since become the home of the Parish of St John the Wonderworker, a parish of the Diocese of Great Britain and Ireland in the Russian Orthodox Church Outside Russia (ROCOR).

In Easter 2007, services transferred to a new church built situated behind the Community Centre, and was built as part of the ongoing regeneration of Colchester Garrison.

== Barracks ==
Barracks include:

- Merville Barracks (Gryphon Road) - Headquarters, 16 Air Assault Brigade; Garrison Headquarters, 216 Parachute Signal Squadron - Royal Corps of Signals, 16 Close Support Medical Regiment - Royal Army Medical Corps, 2nd Battalion, The Parachute Regiment, 3rd Battalion, The Parachute Regiment, 7th Parachute Regiment - Royal Horse Artillery, 13 Air Assault Support Regiment - Royal Logistic Corps, 18 Army Education Centre - Educational and Training Services Branch, 16 VHR MI Coy - Intelligence Corps
- Goojerat Barracks (Goojerat Road) - 156 Provost Company Royal Military Police
- Berechurch Hall Camp (Berechurch Hall Road) - Military Corrective Training Centre
- Territorial Army Centre (Circular Road East Lower) - Territorial Army units
- The following former barracks are now considered to be part of Merville Barracks as they are no longer physically separate from the town centre barracks, and are all behind 1 perimeter fence
  - Kirkee and McMunn Barracks (Reed Hall Avenue)
  - Roman Way Camp (Roman Way)

=== Former barracks (not in use) ===
- Cavalry Barracks (Circular Road North) - former cavalry barracks, built between 1862 and 1863, occasionally used as a transit camp. The large parade ground of the Cavalry barracks served as the backdrop for the opening credits of Blackadder Goes Forth and in a scene in Monty Python's The Meaning of Life.
- Le Cateau Barracks (Le Cateau Road) - the former name of the Royal Artillery Barracks, built in 1874–1875, but named after the Battle of Le Cateau in 1914, in which the RA played a leading role.
- Gymnasium (Circular Road South) - built in 1862
- Meeanee Barracks (Mersea Road) - Developed and restored as housing
- Hyderabad Barracks (Mersea Road) - Developed and restored as housing
- Garrison Church (Military Road) - Now in civilian use by the Russian Orthodox church.

=== Former barracks (demolished) ===
- Sobraon Barracks (Circular Road South) - former infantry barracks, built 1900, demolished 1960s
- Military Hospital - Victorian building, demolished 1990s (Circular Road South)
- Cherrytree camp (Cherrytree Lane) - the former home of 19 Brigade, in use until the 1960s - built before World War I as temporary accommodation for Kitchener's Army, now a housing estate, it also has the Essex Army Cadet Force Weekend Training Centre
- Pool (Circular Road South)
- Roman Barracks. (Roman Way) built in the 1960s and formerly housed an infantry battalion. Demolished and redeveloped as civilian housing.
- Militia Barracks. (St. Andrews Ave.) In use 1850s-80s. Demolished due to incorporation of Militia into Essex Regt. under Cardwell Reforms.

== Military Corrective Training Centre (MCTC) ==
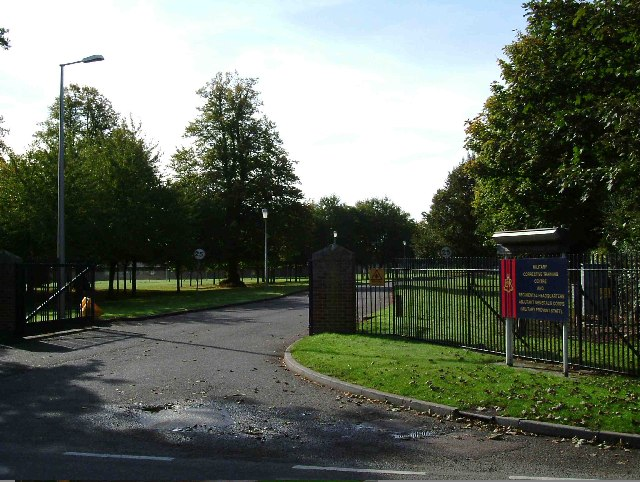
The entrance to the Military Corrective Training Centre

Berechurch Hall Camp is the home of the Armed Forces Military Corrective Training Centre which incorporates the Naval Detention Quarters and is the only dedicated military facility of its kind in the United Kingdom. It is not a prison, although it has a special unit for those who are being transferred to HM Prison Service to serve sentences of imprisonment awarded by Court Martial. Inmates are in three categories:

- Those from the RN, RM, British Army and RAF who are to remain in the Services after sentence and will serve their detention in A Company.
- Those from the RN, RM, British Army and RAF who are to be discharged after their sentence and will serve their detention in D Company.
- Those held in military custody either awaiting the outcome of an investigation, or awaiting HM Prison or HM Young Offender Institute placement.

== Bibliography ==
- James, Brigadier E.A. (1978). British Regiments 1914–18. London: Samson Books Limited. ISBN 0-906304-03-2.
