= Abbey Field =

Suburb of Colchester, England

Coordinates: 51.87°N 00.89°E

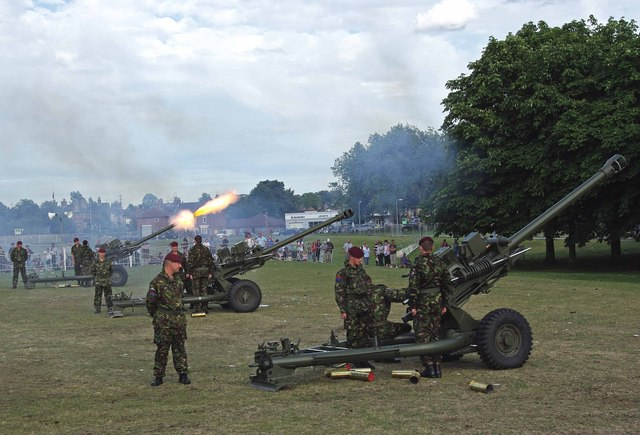
- Abbey Field during the Colchester Military Festival, July 2009

- Location within Essex
- OS grid reference: TL9924
- District: Borough of Colchester
- Shire county: Essex
- Region: East
- Country: England
- Sovereign state: United Kingdom
- Police: Essex
- Fire: Essex
- Ambulance: East of England

Abbey Field is a suburb of Colchester in Essex, England. The area is best known for its eponymous grassland, owned by the Ministry of Defence, which hosts several public and community events.
