= 16 Air Assault Brigade =

Active British Army formation

Coordinates: 51°52.814′N 0°53.295′E

16 Air Assault Brigade Combat Team
- Insignia of 16 Air Assault Brigade
- Active: 1999–present
- Country: United Kingdom
- Branch: British Army
- Role: Air assault
- Part of: 1st (UK) Division
- Garrison/HQ: Colchester Garrison
- Colours: Light-blue and maroon
- Engagements: Iraq War; War in Afghanistan; Fall of Kabul
- Website: www.army.mod.uk/learn-and-explore/about-the-army/formations-divisions-brigades/1st-united-kingdom-division/16-air-assault-brigade-combat-team/

Commanders
- Brigade Commander: Brigadier Ed Cartwright
- Notable commanders: General Sir Mark Carleton-Smith

16 Air Assault Brigade Combat Team is a formation of the British Army predominantly based in Colchester, Essex. It makes up the Air Assault Task Force, a battlegroup held at high readiness, and is the only brigade in the British Army focused on operating via parachute, helicopter and air-landing.

== History ==
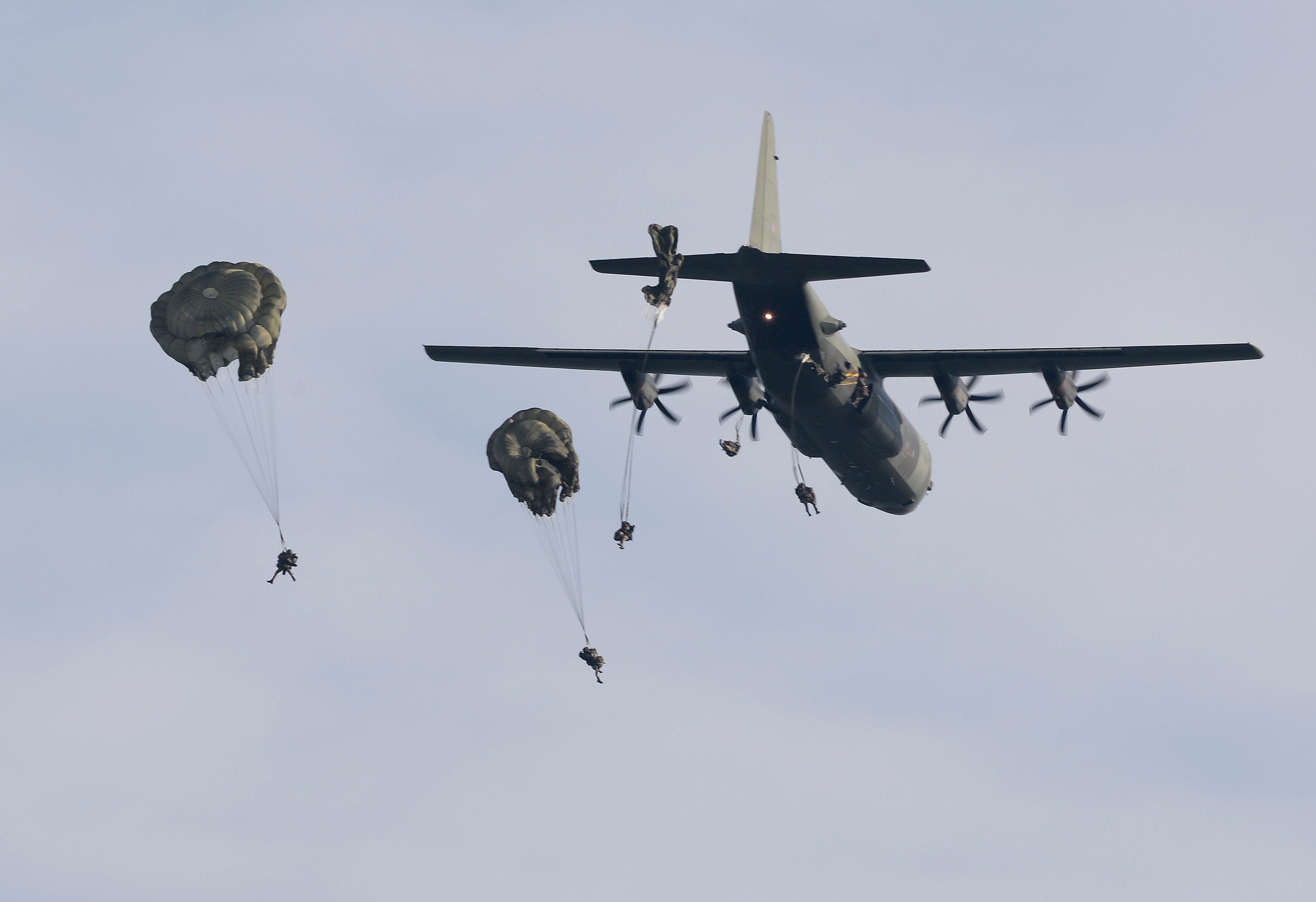
Paratroopers from 16 Air Assault Brigade jump from a Royal Air Force C-130 Hercules over the Salisbury Plain Training Area during Exercise Wessex Storm on 19 November 2014.

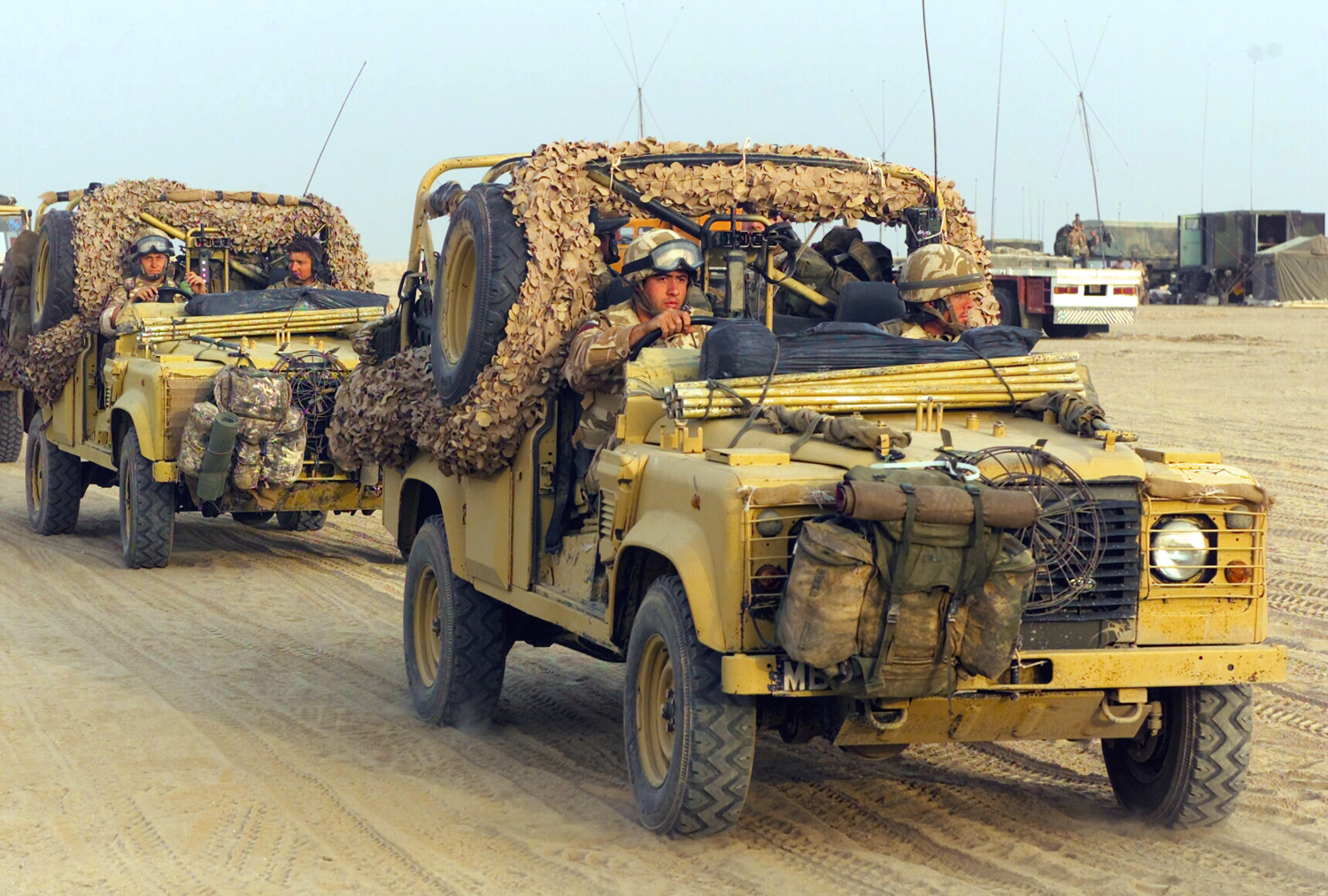
Soldiers from 16 Air Assault Brigade preparing for an evening raid near Basra, Iraq

=== Formation ===
The brigade was formed as part of the defence reforms implemented by the Strategic Defence Review on 1 September 1999, by the merging of 24 Airmobile Brigade and elements of 5th Airborne Brigade. This grouping created a highly mobile brigade of parachute units and airmobile units, which employ helicopters.

=== Macedonia ===
After a ceasefire was declared in the Republic of Macedonia (now known as the Republic of North Macedonia) between government forces and rebels known as the National Liberation Army, NATO launched a British-led effort, Operation Essential Harvest, to collect weapons voluntarily given up by the rebels. The brigade HQ and some of its elements deployed in August 2001, acting as the spearhead for the NATO operation. It returned home after the NATO mission was completed in September.

=== Afghanistan ===
After the invasion of Afghanistan in 2001, NATO established a peacekeeping force in December known as the International Security Assistance Force (ISAF), based in the capital Kabul. The brigade HQ and some of its units deployed to Afghanistan in 2001, 2006, 2008 and again in 2010–11. 16th Air Assault Brigade has deployed to Afghanistan more times than any other formation. Following Taliban gains across the country, the brigade returned to Kabul in August 2021 to ensure the safe evacuation of British nationals as part of Operation Pitting.

=== Iraq ===
During the build-up to the invasion of Iraq, the brigade, commanded by Brigadier Jacko Page, was deployed to Kuwait in February 2003. The brigade was part of 1 (UK) Armoured Division and after extensive training in Kuwait it took part in the beginning of the invasion on 20 March. The brigade's objective was to secure the southern oil fields before they were destroyed by Saddam Hussein's forces. The brigade's 7th Parachute Regiment, Royal Horse Artillery entered Iraq on 20 March to support U.S. Marine Corps forces in their efforts to capture the Rumaila oil fields, nearly all of the oil wells being taken intact. The rest of the brigade, supported by its AAC helicopters, entered Iraq soon afterwards, still tasked with securing Rumaila. The brigade often met sporadic resistance and had to deal with disarming the many explosives attached to the infrastructure.

The brigade was subsequently used to guard the oil fields and protect Allied supply lines with elements moving further north of Basra – Iraq's second largest city – to provide a screen protecting it from Iraqi attack. On 31 March, the brigade, assisted by artillery and air support, attacked an Iraqi armoured column advancing on Basra, destroying 17 T-55 tanks, 5 artillery pieces and 7 armoured personnel carriers. After British forces entered Basra on 6 April 3 PARA was employed to clear the 'old quarter' of the city on 7 April due to the narrow streets making it inaccessible to vehicles.

After Basra's capture, the brigade was based in Maysan Province, centred around the province's capital Al-Amarah. The brigade carried out patrols into towns, helped bring normality back to the south, tried to maintain order and destroyed any conventional weapons caches that were found. The war was officially declared over on 1 May and the brigade began to return home that same month. During one patrol into Majar al-Kabir on 24 June, the brigade suffered its largest casualties in Iraq when six Royal Military Policemen of 156 Provost Company were killed by a large Iraqi mob.

=== Tristan da Cunha ===
On 9 May 2026, a 16 Air Assault Brigade team executed a first-of-its-kind emergency humanitarian mission, parachuting onto Tristan da Cunha to treat a British national with suspected hantavirus. A local island resident who disembarked from the virus-hit cruise ship MV Hondius. Oxygen supplies at the island's hospital had reached a critical level. The territory normally operates with just a two-person medical team. The team comprised six paratroopers from Pathfinder Platoon of the 16 Air Assault Brigade, one specialist doctor and one military intensive care nurse. Due to the critical care required, an intensive care doctor and an intensive care nurse were strapped to paratroopers for tandem jumps. The nurse had done a civilian tandem jump before, but for the doctor, it was their first time. An RAF A400M transport aircraft flew the team 6,788 km from RAF Brize Norton to Ascension Island, before flying another 3,000 km south, sustained by mid-air refuelling from an RAF Voyager tanker. Arriving at the drop zone 5 km northeast of the island, the team jumped from 2500 m so the winds exceeding 50 ln/h would blow them over land. Once the personnel were on the ground, the A400M air-dropped 3.3 tonnes of vital medical cargo and oxygen cylinders across three subsequent runs, successfully stabilising the island's healthcare emergency before the aircraft returned to Ascension.

HMS Medway was then dispatched from her post in the Falkland Islands on 14 May 2026. She sailed for seven days through notoriously rough waters to reach Tristan da Cunha. Medway arrived off the coast on 22 May. Her primary objectives are to deliver six fresh civilian clinicians and heavy medical provisions to ensure long-term healthcare resilience on the island and extract the paratroopers and military medics to the Falklands. On 24 May, sea conditions allowed the military medics and paratroopers to board the ship using a Tristan Fisheries RIB, although some of the paratroopers' kit remained on the island and will be shipped at a later date. Medway then sailed for the Falklands.

== Command structure ==
16 Air Assault Brigade is now under the command of 1st (UK) Division and, from 2024, provides the land component command of a joint and multi-domain sovereign Global Response Force (GRF).

== Structure ==
As the British Army's rapid response formation, 16 Air Assault Brigade has served in the vanguard of all of the Army's recent operational deployments to Sierra Leone, Macedonia, Iraq and Afghanistan, and is the largest brigade in the Army, with 6,200 personnel. It comprises:

- 2nd Battalion, Parachute Regiment
- 3rd Battalion, Parachute Regiment
- 4th Battalion, Parachute Regiment (Reserve)
- 1st Battalion, Royal Gurkha Rifles
- 1st Battalion, The Royal Irish Regiment
- 7th Parachute Regiment Royal Horse Artillery
- 23 Parachute Engineer Regiment
- 13 Air Assault Support Regiment RLC
- 16 Medical Regiment
- 216 Parachute Signal Squadron
- the Pathfinder Platoon
- one intelligence company
- 7 Air Assault Battalion, Royal Electrical and Mechanical Engineers

The brigade HQ is based in Colchester Garrison and reports directly to Commander Field Army whilst the Army Air Corps units previously assigned to the brigade will remain under Joint Aviation Command.

The Brigade Headquarters has personnel from both the British Army and the Royal Air Force assigned, enabling it to carry out air and land operations.

Due to the brigade's mobile role, it is lightly armed and equipped. The brigade's land equipment includes Foxhounds, Jackal 2s, WMIK Land Rovers, Supacat ATMPs, towed L118 light guns, Javelin anti-tank and lightweight Starstreak air-defence missile launchers. The aviation element of the brigade consists of three attack regiments equipped with AH-64E Apache and AW159 Wildcat helicopters from the Army Air Corps, Chinook and Puma support helicopters from the RAF, and Merlin support helicopters from the Fleet Air Arm (all of which are controlled by Joint Aviation Command). Furthermore, two four-man Tactical Air Control Parties (TACPs) manned by the RAF Regiment provide airspace deconfliction, integration of air platforms within the battlespace, and terminal control of air assets.

Under the Defence in a Competitive Age programme and subsequent Future Soldier, the brigade was redesignated as the 16th Air Assault Brigade. At the same time, the 1st Battalion, Royal Irish Regiment re-joined the brigade.

== Pathfinder Platoon ==
In 1984, 5th Airborne Brigade was in the process of developing its Limited Parachute Assault Capability (LPAC). This required a formation of 15 Hercules aircraft to drop a parachute battalion group over two drop zones (DZs) in under five minutes, by day or night. To do this, there was a requirement for the DZs to be clearly marked, to ensure that the crews had an easily identified reference point to allow them to drop accurately and consistently. With the demise of the 16th Parachute Brigade in 1977, the disbandment of No 1 (Guards) Independent Company meant that the expertise had been lost. Regimental Headquarters was asked to look at the options for providing this capability. Major Phil Neame produced a paper in October 1984 recommending the formation of an independent platoon, with manpower drawn from all three battalions and coming directly under the command of the Brigade Headquarters. It would number a total of 28 in 7 patrols of 4 men and include 2 Royal Signals operators.

Today, the Pathfinder Platoon is made up of selected personnel from the armed forces, who have undergone a rigorous selection and training programme. The Group is formed around a platoon to company strength cadre of reconnaissance and communications specialists. Its roles include locating and marking parachute drop zones and tactical and helicopter landing zones for air landing operations. Once the main force has landed, the group provides tactical intelligence to assist operational decision-making within the brigade headquarters. The pathfinders can utilise various airborne insertion techniques, which range from the current in-service Low Level Parachute (LLP), to High Altitude Low Opening (HALO) and High Altitude High Opening (HAHO) systems.

== Traditions ==
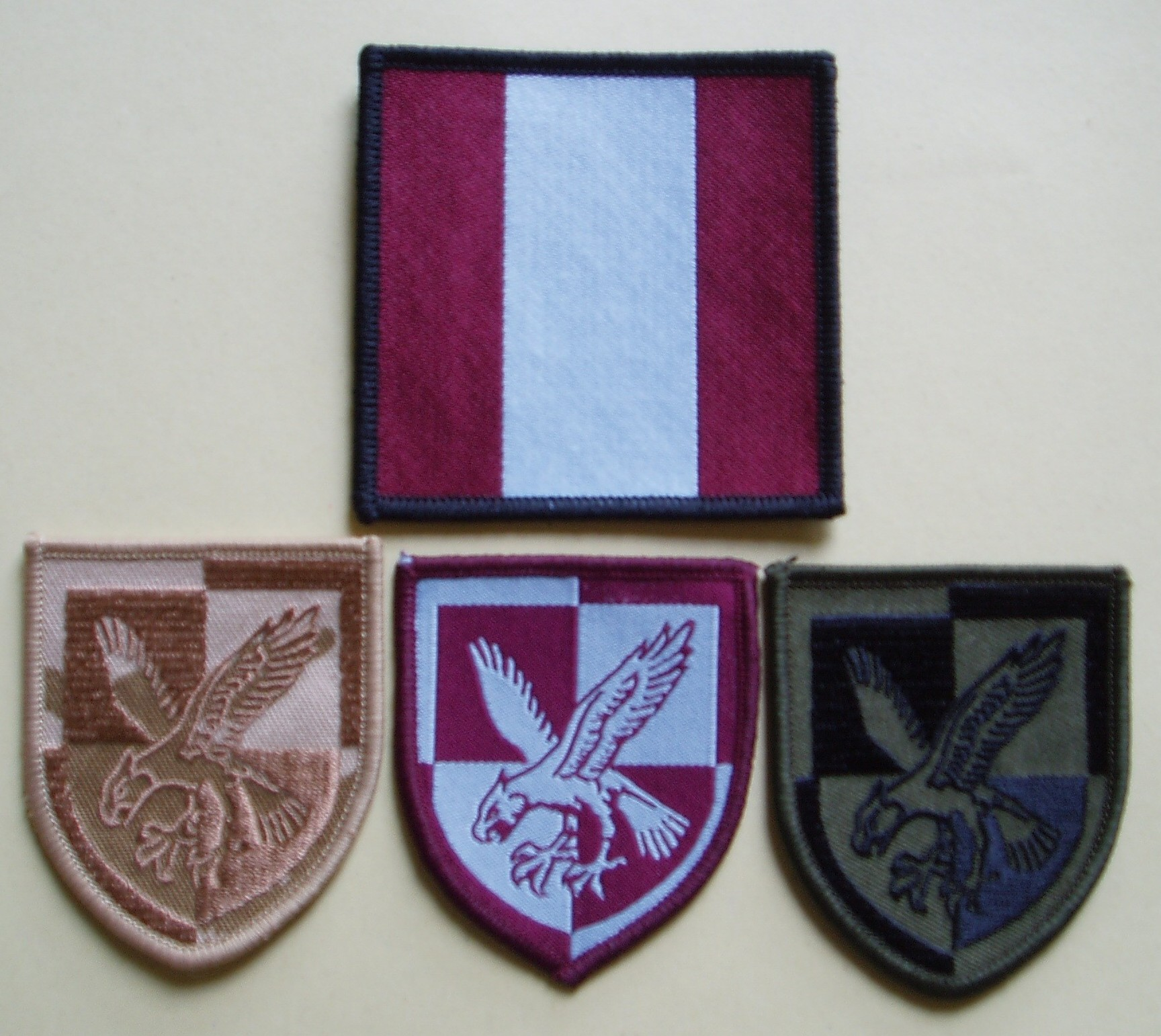
Top: Drop Zone patch. Bottom left to right: Desert Subdued, Full Colour, DPM Subdued versions of the Brigade's original Striking Eagle insignia (1999–2015)

The numeral 16 is derived from the 1st Airborne Division and 6th Airborne Division of the Second World War, first used by the 16th Parachute Brigade formed in 1948.

The brigade's original emblem was a light-blue and maroon shield with a light blue Striking Eagle outlined in maroon emblazoned upon it, and was adopted from the Special Training Centre in Lochailort, Scotland, where Special Forces and Airborne troops were trained between 1943 and 1945. The sign was worn on the left arm. The colours chosen were traditional and showed the make-up of the brigade, maroon for Airborne and light-blue for Army Air Corps.

The symbol of 5 Airborne Brigade had been Bellerophon on top of Pegasus (a winged horse of Greek mythology) and became synonymous with British airborne forces during World War II. When 16 Air Assault Brigade was formed there was some controversy when the Parachute units of 5 Airborne had to give up the Pegasus symbol and replace it with the Striking Eagle symbol.

However, following Army 2020 restructuring, command of 16 Air Assault Brigade was transferred from Joint Helicopter Command to Commander Field Army, and the Pegasus emblem returned as the symbol of British airborne forces on 25 November 2015.

== Composition ==
The composition of the brigade after the Future Soldier reorganisation:

- Headquarters, 16th Air Assault Brigade, at Merville Barracks, Colchester Garrison
  - 2nd Battalion, The Parachute Regiment (Airborne Infantry), at Merville Barracks, Colchester Garrison
  - 3rd Battalion, The Parachute Regiment (Airborne Infantry, at Merville Barracks, Colchester Garrison
  - 4th Battalion, The Parachute Regiment (Army Reserve), at Thornbury Barracks, Pudsey
  - 1st Battalion or 2nd Battalion (rotates every 3 years), The Royal Gurkha Rifles (Air Assault Infantry), at Folkestone
  - 1st Battalion, The Royal Irish Regiment (27th (Inniskilling), 83rd, 87th and The Ulster Defence Regiment) (Light Recce Strike Infantry), at Clive Barracks, Tern Hil (Will move to Edinburgh by 2027)
  - 7th Parachute Regiment, Royal Horse Artillery (Airborne Close Support Artillery), at Merville Barracks, Colchester Garrison (12 x L118 105mm light guns)
  - A (1st City of London) Battery, Honourable Artillery Company, at Armoury House, Finsbury Barracks (a battery of 105mm light guns. The battery is paired with 7th Parachute Regiment Royal Horse Artillery.)
  - 23 Parachute Engineer Regiment, Royal Engineers (Close Support Air Manoeuvre Engineers), at Rock Barracks, Woodbridge
    - 299 Parachute Squadron (Army Reserve), in Wakefield, Gateshead, and Hull
  - 13 Air Assault Support Regiment, Royal Logistic Corps (Air Assault Logistics), at Merville Barracks, Colchester Garrison
  - 16 Medical Regiment, Royal Army Medical Corps (Air Manoeuvre Medical Regiment), at Merville Barracks, Colchester Garrison
    - 144 Parachute Medical Squadron (Army Reserve), in London, Cardiff, Glasgow, and Nottingham
  - 216 Parachute Signal Squadron, Royal Corps of Signals (Communication and Information Support), at Merville Barracks, Colchester Garrison
  - The Pathfinder Platoon (Pathfinders), at Merville Barracks, Colchester Garrison
  - 16 VHR (Very High Readiness) MI Coy, Intelligence Corps, at Merville Barracks, Colchester Garrison
  - 8 Field Company (Para), REME, at Merville Barracks, Colchester Garrison

== Commanders ==
Brigade commander's car flag

Commanders have included:

- 1999–2000 Brigadier Peter Wall (late Royal Engineers)
- 2000–2002 Brigadier Barney White-Spunner (late Blues and Royals)
- 2002–2004 Brigadier Jacko Page (late Parachute Regiment)
- 2004–2007 Brigadier Ed Butler (late Royal Green Jackets)
- 2007–2008 Brigadier Mark Carleton-Smith (late Irish Guards)
- 2008–2011 Brigadier James Chiswell (late Parachute Regiment)
- 2011–2013 Brigadier Giles Hill (late Parachute Regiment)
- 2013–2015 Brigadier Nick Borton (late Royal Regiment of Scotland)
- 2015–2017 Brigadier Colin Weir (late Royal Irish)
- 2017–2019 Brigadier Nick Perry (late King's Royal Hussars)
- 2019–2020 Brigadier John Clark (late Royal Engineers)
- 2020–2021 Brigadier James Martin (late Princess of Wales's Royal Regiment)
- 2021–2023 Brigadier Nick Cowley (late The Queen's Royal Hussars)
- 2023–2025 Brigadier Mark Berry (late Life Guards)
- 2025–present Brigadier Ed Cartwright (late Parachute Regiment)

== See also ==
- Army Special Operations Brigade
- United Kingdom Commando Force

=== Historic/Defunct ===
- 1st Airborne Division
- 6th Airborne Division
