= 216 Parachute Signal Squadron =

216 (Parachute) Signal Squadron
- Active: 1 September 1959 – Present
- Country: United Kingdom
- Branch: British Army
- Type: Airborne communications support
- Role: Telecommunications and information systems maintenance and support
- Size: 230 people
- Part of: 16 Air Assault Brigade
- Garrison/HQ: Merville Barracks; Colchester, England
- Nickname: "Airborne Signals"

Insignia
- Abbreviation: 216 (Para) Sig Sqn
- Drop zone flash

216 (Parachute) Signal Squadron is a squadron of the British Army's Royal Corps of Signals that is responsible for installing, maintaining and operating all types of telecommunications equipment and information systems in support of the 16 Air Assault Brigade.

== History ==
The squadron traces it lineage to the 2nd Independent Parachute Brigade Group Signal Company formed in May 1947 from two Second World War airborne divisions: the 1st Airborne Division disbanded in 1945 and the 6th Airborne Division disbanded in 1948. In June 1948, the company was re-designated as the 16th Independent Parachute Brigade Group Signal Squadron with the number 16 representing the "1" and "6" from the two wartime airborne divisions.

The 216 Signal Squadron (Parachute Brigade Group) was formed on 1 September 1959 from the 16th Independent Parachute Brigade Group Signal Squadron. The squadron had been re-designated in line with a new Royal Signals policy that required it to be designated with a three figure number with the '2' denoting its independent status. Elements of the squadron deployed on active service to Bahrain, Aden, Cyprus and Borneo. In July 1965, the squadron was renamed 216 Parachute Signal Squadron following the 16th Parachute Brigade Group earlier removing the word "Group" from its title in January 1965. Elements of the squadron deployed on active service to Bahrain, Aden, Borneo and British Guyana. In 1971, the squadron completed a four-month tour of duty in Northern Ireland.

In March 1976, the squadron commenced implementing the Army Restructuring Plan 1975 to become a United Kingdom Mobile Force (UKMF) losing its airborne role. In April 1977, HQ 16 Parachute Brigade and 216 Parachute Signal Squadron amalgamated to form 6th Field Force Headquarters & Signal Squadron. In April 1978, the squadron assumed the UKMF role.

In 1981, the squadron was re-rolled and re-designated as 1st Infantry Brigade Headquarters and Signal Squadron (216). In 1982, an element of the squadron formed part of the task force deployed to the South Atlantic for the Falklands War. In November 1983, 5 Airborne Brigade Headquarters and Signal Squadron (205) was formed and in December 1983 that squadron was re-rolled as airborne. 1st Infantry Brigade Headquarters and Signal Squadron (216) was re-designated as 205 Signal Squadron. In October 1991, 205 Signal Squadron was re-designated as 216 Parachute Signal Squadron.

In June 1999, as part of 5 Airborne Brigade, the squadron was amongst the first NATO troops into Kosovo during the Kosovo War. On 1 September 1999, elements of 216 Signal Squadron and 24 Airmobile Brigade Headquarters & Signal Squadron (210) of 24 Airmobile Brigade formed up on 1 September 1999 in both Colchester and Pristina, Kosovo as 216 Signal Squadron as part of 16 Air Assault Brigade. In 2006, 216 Signal Squadron was renamed 216 (Parachute) Signal Squadron.

== Operations ==
Operation	Country	Year
Operation Palliser	Sierra Leone	2000
Operation Essential Harvest	Macedonia	2001
Operation Veritas	Afghanistan	2001–2002
Operation Telic	Iraq	2002–2003
Operation Herrick IV	Afghanistan	2006
Operation Herrick VIII	Afghanistan	2008
Operation Herrick XIII	Afghanistan	2010–2011

== See also ==
- Units of the Royal Corps of Signals
