= Operation Telescope =

1956 Franco-British operation of the Suez Crisis

- Part of Suez Crisis
Date	5–6 November 1956
Location	Port Said, Egypt
Result	Franco-British victory

Belligerents
United Kingdom; France	Egypt

Commanders and leaders
(United Kingdom) M A H Butler (United Kingdom) Paul Edwin Crooke (France) Jacques Massu	(Egypt) Gamal Abdel Nasser

Strength
(United Kingdom) 3. PARA (United Kingdom) Other Detachments (France) 2. RPC	(Egypt) 3 Companies of Regulars; Local Paramilitary Forces

Casualties and losses
4 killed 32 wounded 1 Westland Wyvern	(Egypt) 200 (executed); 3 SU-100s Captured

Operation Telescope was a Franco-British operation conducted from 5 to 6 November 1956 during the Suez Crisis, consisting of a series of parachute drops launched by the British 3 PARA, in combination with French paratroop forces, 24 hours before the seaborne landing on Port Said during Operation Musketeer. Troops dropped onto Gamil airfield and Port Fuad to secure airfields and prevent Egyptian forces from providing air defence. It was put forward by the deputy Land Task Force Commander General André Beaufre under the original name Omelette which included many more drops but was adapted due to British fear of another failure like Arnhem and a lack of aircraft able to deploy paratroopers.

The capture of the airfield at El Gamil and the surrounding area was an essential element in Operation Musketeer, the joint Anglo-French airborne and amphibious assault on Port Said, with the ultimate aim of gaining control of the Suez Canal. The French 2nd Colonial Parachute Regiment were to land at Er Raswa while the 3rd Battalion, Parachute Regiment, part of 16th Independent Parachute Brigade, were tasked with the attack on El Gamil, which would be the first British battalion parachute assault since World War II and the last to date. At the insistence of French commanders, the airborne assaults on El Gamil and Raswa were to take place a full 24 hours before the arrival of the seaborne element, in order to preserve the element of surprise, as it would be difficult to conceal the approach of the large invasion fleet.

== Order of Battle ==
This is a list of known units that participated in the battle:

=== UK ===
British Army

- Brigade Tactical HQ, 16th Independent Parachute Brigade, Brigadier M A H Butler, MC
- 3rd Battalion, Parachute Regiment, Lieutenant Colonel Paul Edwin Crooke, CBE DSO MA
  - "A" Company, Major Michael J. H. Walsh
  - "B" Company, Major Stevens
  - "C" Company, Major Ronald Norman
  - "D" Company
- Forward Observation Officer (FOO) Detachment, 97 Battery (Lawson's Company) Royal Artillery, 33 (Para) Field Regiment, Royal Artillery
- 3 Troop, 9 Independent Parachute Field Squadron, Royal Engineers
- Detachment, 16th Independent Parachute Brigade Signal Squadron, Royal Signals
- Detachment, 23 Parachute Field Ambulance, Royal Army Medical Corps
- Detachment, Parachute Platoon, 63 Company, Royal Army Service Corps
- 13 Air Contact Team, Royal Air Force
- Detachment, Brigade RAF Parachute Detachment

=== France ===
- 2. RPC

=== Egypt ===
Egyptian Army

- One battalion group comprising:
  - One company covering the airfield with 2 x medium machine guns (MMG) in pillboxes
  - One company holding the adjacent cemetery with 3 x MMG, 1x 6 pounder anti-tank gun and 4 x 81 mm mortars
  - One company holding a coastguard barracks
- Supported by 3 x SU-100 tank destroyers, 2 x 3.7 inch anti-aircraft guns
- National Guard paramilitaries in the nearby town

== The battle ==
Before the landing, the British launched airstrikes on Egyptian defensive positions around the battlefield, effectively neutralizing many of them. Still, as 3. PARA landed at 0515 GMT, they came under fire, unable to return it until they had retrieved the caches with their weapons. Egyptian fire was inaccurate however, and ultimately the British suffered very few casualties.

The British lacked heavy support equipment, but the small arms and light AT and support weapons they had were more than adequate to take the airfield, the AT being particularly effective at knocking out four concrete pillboxes. Other than these bunkers, the Egyptians withdrew to favorable terrain to avoid annihilation at the hands of the superior British forces. The Egyptians' three SU-100 self-propelled guns proved to be particularly difficult for the PARAs.

3. PARA then moved onto Port Said, surviving a friendly fire incident with French planes who strafed them. B Company captured the sewage works which provided cover from Egyptian snipers, however, not wanting to push forward and storm the highly defensible Coast Guard Barracks, they called in air support in the form of Wyverns who dropped bombs on the position for the loss of one aircraft and inflicting heavy casualties. Running out of ammo however, the British retreated to the sewage works.

16 km to the southeast, the French 2. RPC achieved a lot more success, managing to take the Western span of the Rawsa Bridges (rendered inoperable by damage) and the Said waterworks, cutting off the supplies into the city. With supplies cut off and a potential chokepoint captured by mid-morning, the French had achieved all their objectives on the first day.

Following the unsuccessful negotiation of a ceasefire during the night, C Company was sent to capture the cemetery at 0510 GMT, which was completed without opposition. This was followed up by an assault on the Coast Guard building from which a considerable amount of sniper fire was coming. The building was captured by 0800 with no casualties whereupon they were ordered to capture a hospital to complete the link up with 45 Commando.

In the closing stage of the battle, a patrol of four men was ambushed and injured by Egyptian fire whereupon a medical officer, Captain Elliot rescued them under heavy fire for which he was awarded the Military Cross.

== Analysis and aftermath ==
The success of the operation paved the way for the landing of 40 and 42 Commandos on 6 November.

The British parachute drop on Gamil airfield was a success despite the inability of the British to fire their personal weapons until they retrieved them from their personal containers attached to them. The oil drums placed on the airfield by Egyptian forces failed to prevent the drop and in fact provided cover for the British paratroopers.

The French had even more success in their landing, being able to use beneficial terrain and losing no one in the drop due to low flying by the transport planes. The French drop on Port Fuad was so successful that a follow-up amphibious landing on Port Fuad was deemed unnecessary.

One criticism of the operation was that the drop on Gamil was not followed up with reinforcements from 45 Commando with helicopters. However, the use of helicopters was new to warfare at the time, and the British did not want to risk their failing to meet their objectives and complicating subsequent operations.

In his book, The Suez Crisis, American Military Historian, Derek Varble argues that Gamil airfield had very little significance in terms of airpower as he argues that "Egypt's air force collapsed before November 5, while Gamil's limited size prevented its use by most RAF planes".

In a description of the battle by 3. PARA, the author notes that while the battle itself was a complete success, it was a political blunder.

== See also ==
- Suez Crisis
