= 23 Parachute Engineer Regiment =

- Active: 1948 - Present
- Country: United Kingdom
- Branch: British Army
- Role: Combat engineering
- Size: 5 squadrons
- Part of: 16 Air Assault Brigade
- Garrison/HQ: Rock Barracks/Woodbridge Airfield, Woodbridge, Suffolk
- Engagements: Iraq War; War in Afghanistan

Commanders
- Current commander: Lt Col D. Crosbie

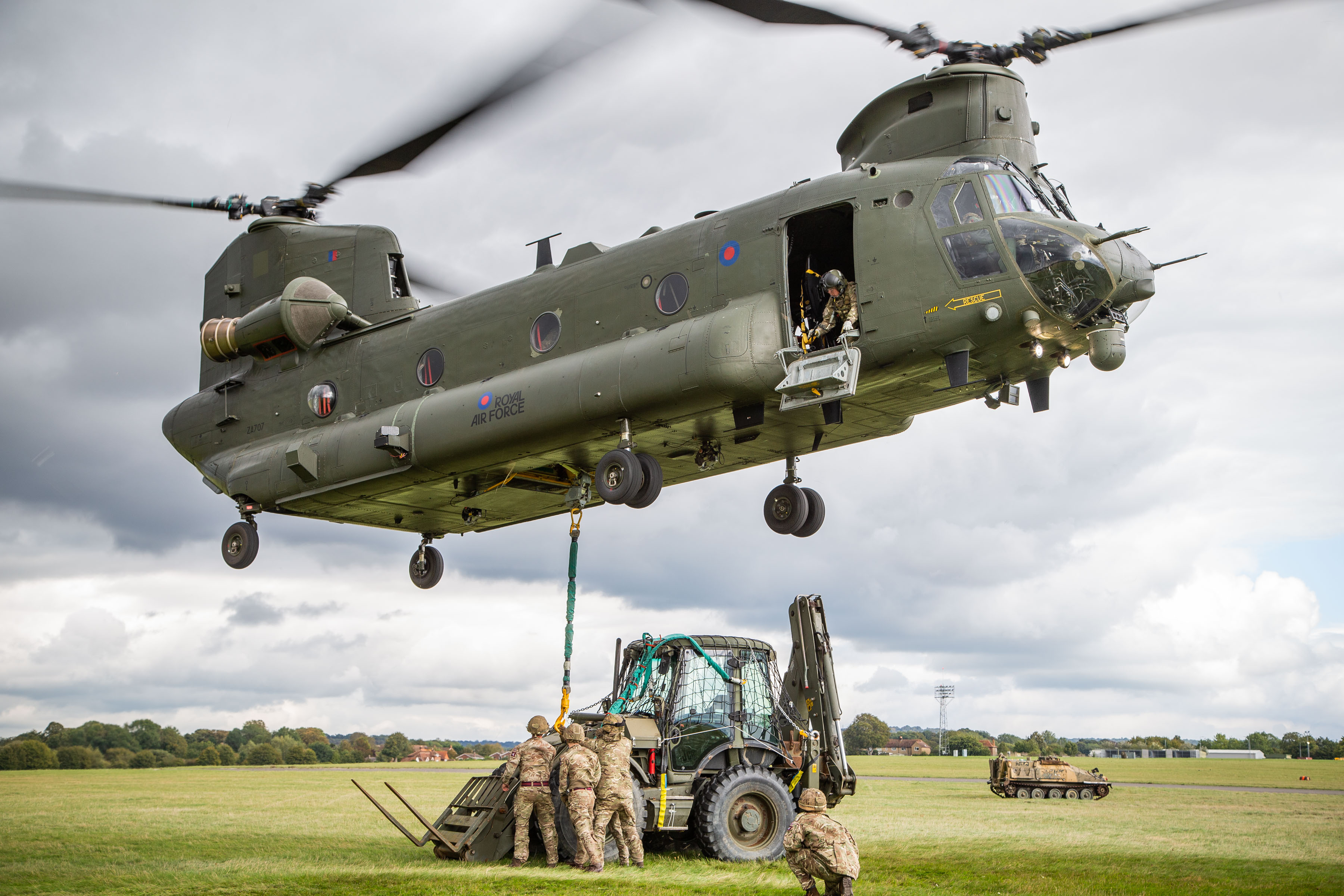
9 Sqn Support Troop and 23 PER on exercise in 2020

23 Parachute Engineer Regiment is a Royal Engineers regiment in the British Army that was formed in 2003. It provides engineer support to 16 Air Assault Brigade in both the parachute and air assault role. The regiment is currently based at Rock Barracks in Suffolk and consists of four regular squadrons and one Army Reserve squadron. As part of 16 Air Assault Brigade Combat Team it can be called upon to deploy on operations across the globe at extremely short notice.

== History ==
23 Engineer Regiment can trace its roots to the founding of the airborne forces of the Parachute Regiment and other related during the Second World War. In July 1948, 23rd Field Engineer Regiment was formed in Iserlohn from the former 2nd Division Divisional Engineer regiment. In December 1948, the regiment moved to Halen and two years later moved to Dortmund. In September 1957, 2 Field Squadron was allocated to 6th Infantry Brigade and 5 Field Squadron to the 5th Infantry Brigade. In May 1958, the regiment was split and its headquarters became the new "Headquarters Royal Engineers, 2nd Division".

Eleven years later in April 1969, it was re-organised into the new 23 Engineer Regiment at Osnabruck. The regiment served as infantry in Northern Ireland from March - July 1972. In September 1976 the 2nd Division was re-organized as an armoured formation, and the regiment was broken up for the second time. In January 1983, at Osnabruck the regiment reformed and later took part in the trial of Close Support Troops. In 1991 the regiment, participated in the Gulf War supporting 4th Armoured Brigade. 39 Field Squadron provided Close Support Troops for each of the Brigade's 3 Battlegroups, whilst 73 Field Squadron acted as General Support to the Brigade. The regiment was later disbanded in 1993 as a result of the Options for Change.

In 2001, 23 Engineer Regiment was tasked to provide engineer support to the newly formed 16 Air Assault Brigade. The regiment was deployed for Operation Herrick and in September 2009 on their return from Afghanistan the regiment was granted the Freedom of the town of Woodbridge. In 2015, the "Parachute" title was officially added to the name, although the unit had already been supporting 16 Air Assault Brigade since its re-establishment, and a new flag was presented to the regiment to mark the occasion.

== Organization ==
- 23 Parachute Engineer Regiment
  - 12 Parachute HQ & Support Squadron – includes an Engineer Recce Troop, Dive Team and a Signal Troop
  - 9 Parachute Squadron
  - 51 Parachute Squadron
  - 70 Gurkha Parachute Squadron
  - 299 Parachute Squadron (Army Reserve), in Wakefield, Hull and Gateshead

== Commanding officers ==
Commanding Officers of the Regiment have included:

- 2015–2017: Lt. Col. J. Clarke
- 2017–2020: Lt. Col. S. Carvel
- 2020–2022: Lt. Col. J. Robinson
- 2022–2024: Lt. Col. J. Crossley
- 2024–present: Lt. Col. D. Crosbie

== Regimental Sergeant Majors ==
Regimental Sergeant Majors of the Regiment have included:
