= Sutton upon Tern =

Civil parish in Shropshire, England

Coordinates: 52.881°N 2.494°W

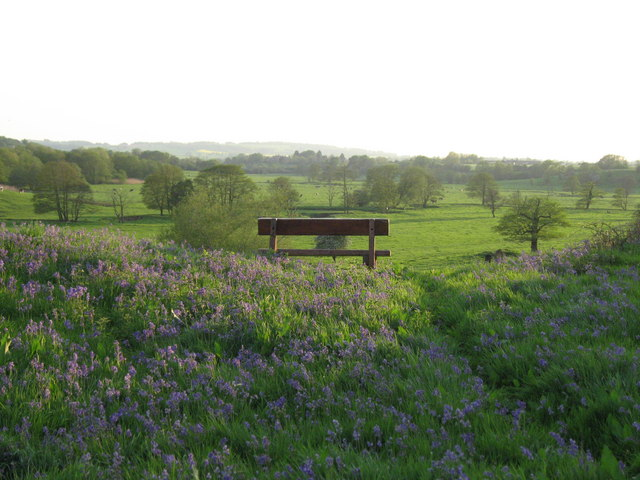
- A view from the Norman earthwork (a scheduled ancient monument) on Fordhall Farm, Sutton-upon-Tern

- Location within Shropshire
- Population: 1,232 (2011 Census)
- OS grid reference: SJ666317
- Civil parish: Sutton upon Tern
- Unitary authority: Shropshire
- Ceremonial county: Shropshire
- Region: West Midlands
- Country: England
- Sovereign state: United Kingdom
- Post town: MARKET DRAYTON
- Postcode district: TF9
- Dialling code: 01630
- Police: West Mercia
- Fire: Shropshire
- Ambulance: West Midlands
- UK Parliament: North Shropshire

Sutton upon Tern is a civil parish in Shropshire, England. Expanded in 1914 after the abolition of the parish of Drayton in Hales, its name in Old English means 'South farm/settlement' on the River Tern. It lies south of Market Drayton, on the River Tern.

== About ==
At the 2011 census the parish had a population of 1,232, the majority of them between the ages of 35 and 55. A description of Sutton upon Tern was written in the early 1870s:

"SUTTON, a township in Drayton-in-Hales parish, Salop; 1 mile SSW of Market-Drayton. Pop[ulation]., 177"

It is unusual in that a small area of the parish, at Ternhill, is almost an exclave of the parish: only a 5m wide strip of land joins it with the bulk of the parish.

In the north-west of the parish is Service Family Accommodation for nearby Clive Barracks. The housing estates are not "behind the wire" and consist of two areas; Buntingsdale Park (mainly Officer's housing) and Buntingsdale Estate for other ranks. Buntingsdale Primary School and a pub are nearby.

The hamlet of Woodseaves is in the east of the parish on the A529. Woodseaves is the midpoint of the longest north–south axis of the UK. Other than a few houses there is a nearby public house, The Four Alls Inn, a garden centre and a narrow gauge railway attraction.

Along the western border of the parish runs the A41 that is built upon a Roman Road linking the fort of Mediolanum (Whitchurch) to Pennocrucium (Stretton, Staffordshire).

== History ==
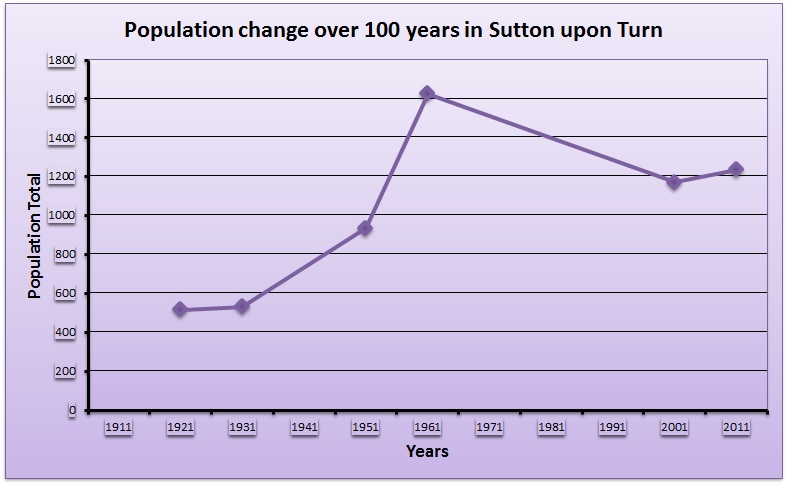
Total population of Sutton upon Tern, Shropshire. Obtained from the population census between 1921–2011

Sutton upon Tern was mentioned in the 1086 Domesday Book in a district called 'Wrockwardine' under the ownership of Roger of Courseulles who was recorded as tenant-in-chief. Sutton upon Tern was recorded as having 1 mill and 12 households, containing 9 villagers, 7 ploughlands, 9 smallholders, 2 plough teams and 1 lord's plough teams.

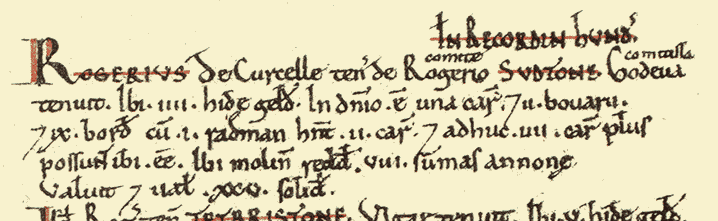
Entry for Sutton upon Tern in the 1086 Domesday Book

Brownhill Wood and Salisbury Hill, south of Market Drayton, was the scene of the gathering of the Earl of Salisbury's troops before the Battle of Blore Heath in 1459 during the Wars of the Roses. An 18-hole golf course now occupies this site.

The first census entry for Sutton upon Tern was made in 1921 where it had a total population of 512. This figure began to grow and by 1961 the population had tripled in size to 1,622. This can be attributed to the introduction of the National Health Service in 1948 allowing widespread use of new antibiotics and the post-war National Food Policy, all contributing to the post-war baby boom. The population total has since peaked and has been slowly declining as shown in the census of 2011.

In 1965 the civil parish was enlarged by the transfer of the part of the Staffordshire parish of Tyrley west of the Shropshire Union Canal (including the site of the lost settlement of Tyrley and Tyrley Castle) to the parish. Tyrley (Tirley) Castle was located alongside the present day A529. "The castle built after the conquest by the Pantulfs" is believed to date back to 1066 and later rebuilt in stone in the thirteenth-century. The castle succeeded by a newly built Manor house in the 1280s which fell into disrepair, with an eighteenth-century farmhouse built upon the site to this day.

== Places of interest ==
Buntingsdale Hall, an 18th-century Grade II listed building, is in the parish.

Woodseaves Cutting (also known as Tyrley Canal Cutting) is a deep cut on the Shropshire Union Canal, named after the nearby hamlet to the west of the canal. Completed in 1832, it is the longest cutting on any canal in Britain. It is about 2.7 km long and up to about 21.3m deep.

Tyrley Wharf, north of Woodseaves, served as a small dock above a flight of five locks. In 1911 it was used to load milk churns to be taken from the Peatswood Estate to Cadbury's factory at Knighton.

Market Drayton Golf Club, founded in 1906, is an 18-hole golf course.

== See also ==
- Listed buildings in Sutton upon Tern
