= General Weir =

General Weir may refer to:

- Colin Weir (born 1971), British Army major general
- George Alexander Weir (1876–1951), British Army general
- Norman Weir (1893–1961), New Zealand Military Forces major general
- Stanley Price Weir (1866–1944), Australian Army brigadier general
- Stephen Weir (1904–1969), New Zealand Military Forces major general
