= Royal Irish Regiment =

Royal Irish Regiment may be either of two British Army regiments:

- Royal Irish Regiment (1684–1922), also known as the 18th Regiment of Foot
- Royal Irish Regiment (1992), properly named the Royal Irish Regiment (27th (Inniskilling) 83rd and 87th and Ulster Defence Regiment)
