= Pell Wall Hall =

Country house in Sutton upon Tern, Shropshire, England

Coordinates: 52.892°N 2.481°W

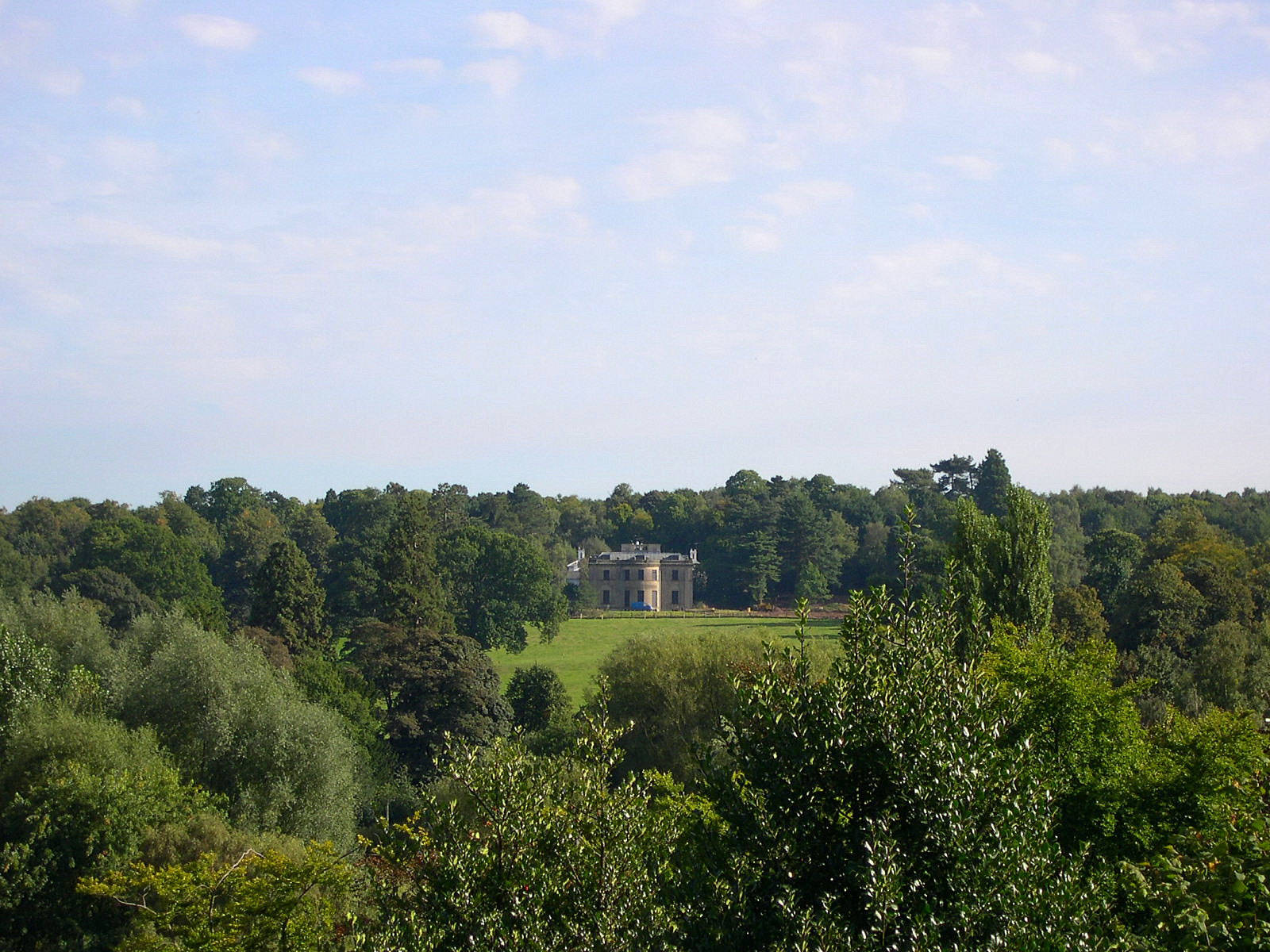
Pell Wall Hall

Pell Wall Hall is a neo-classical country house on the outskirts of Market Drayton in Shropshire. Faced in Grinshill sandstone, Pell Wall is the last completed domestic house designed by Sir John Soane and was constructed 1822–1828 for local iron merchant Purney Sillitoe at a total cost of £20,976.

After Sillitoe's death, Pell Wall was inherited by Marten Harcourt Griffin who between 1872 and 1875 added the south wing and had all the interiors remodelled. Financial problems caused Pell Wall to be let from 1891 until 1901 when it was purchased by a brewer from Liverpool named James Munroe Walker who occupied the house until 1917. It was used for its original purpose until 1928 when it was acquired by the Brothers of Christian Instruction, initially as a theological college and latterly as a boys' boarding school. The building was abandoned in 1962 and left to deteriorate until May 1986 when it was gutted by a fire which burnt for three days.

Ownership of Pell Wall passed to the local authority in 1988 under a compulsory purchase order; it was subsequently sold to the Pell Wall Preservation Trust for £1. Over the next ten years later Victorian and Edwardian additions were completely removed and the shell of the John Soane original was restored using a one million pound grant from English Heritage and a loan from the Architectural Heritage Fund. The house is still in a shell state comprising five ground-floor rooms, six first-floor rooms, six second-floor rooms and a large cellar. In November 2009 Pell Wall Hall and its four-acre grounds was put up for sale and was subsequently purchased for £580,000 by a private buyer who has stated his intention to "reinstate this country residence in empathy with Sir John Soane’s original drawings.”

== See also ==
- Grade II* listed buildings in Shropshire Council (H–Z)
- Listed buildings in Sutton upon Tern
