= Operation Barras =

2000 military operation in Sierra Leone led by the UK

- Part of the Sierra Leone Civil War
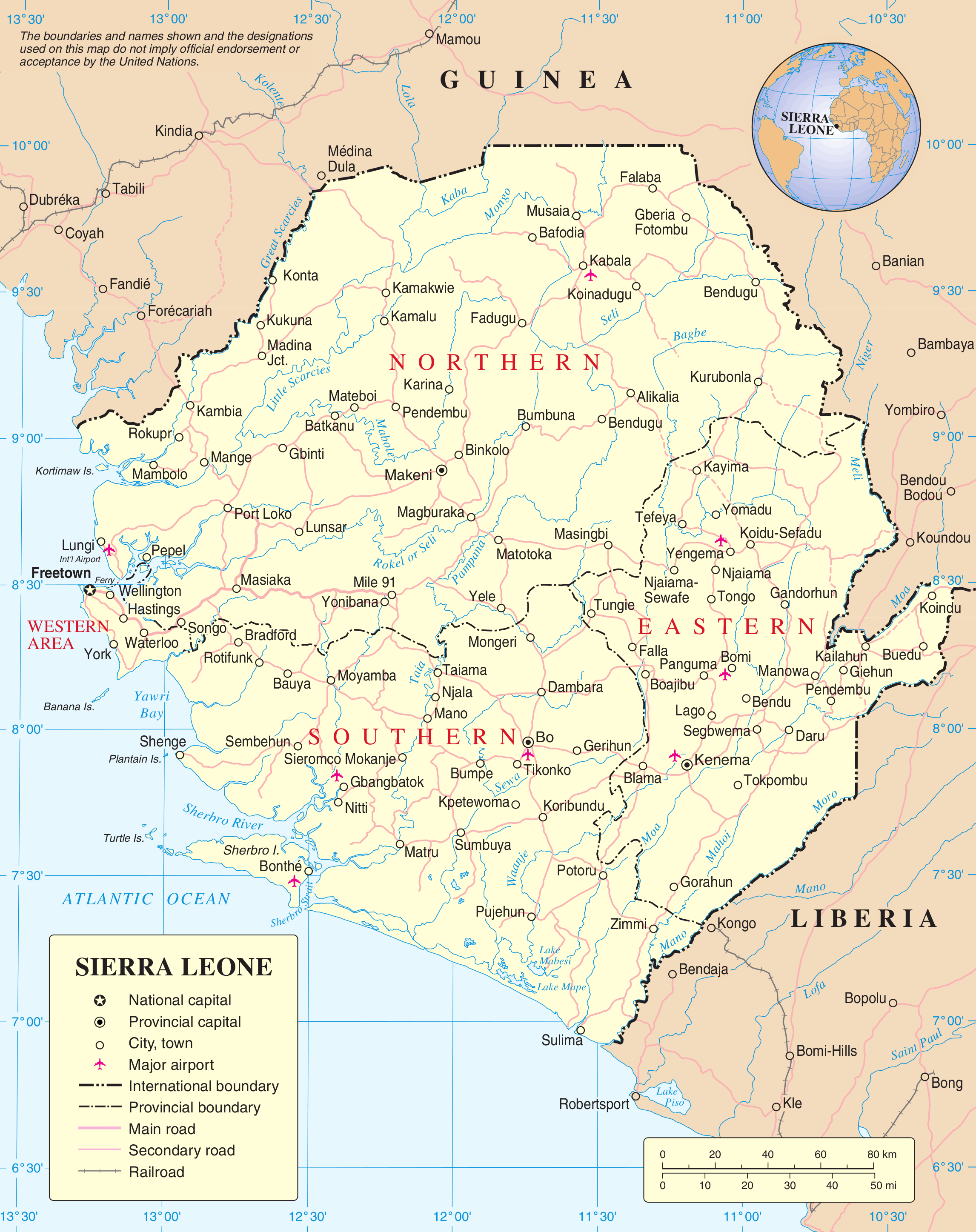
- A map of Sierra Leone on which is marked Freetown (the capital, to the extreme west) and the nearby towns of Hastings (where the SAS and Paras prepared for the operation) and Masiaka (where the Jordanian detachment of UNAMSIL was based)
Date	10 September 2000
Location	Occra Hills, Sierra Leone 8°33′18″N 12°47′51″W
Result	British victory

Belligerents
United Kingdom	West Side Boys

Commanders and leaders
John Holmes	Foday Kallay (POW)

Strength
150	100–200

Casualties and losses
1 killed 12 wounded	25+ killed 18 captured

Operation Barras was a British Army operation that took place in Sierra Leone on 10 September 2000, during the late stages of the Sierra Leone Civil War. The operation aimed to release six British soldiers of the Royal Irish Regiment and their Sierra Leone Army (SLA) liaison officer, who were being held by a militia group known as the "West Side Boys". The soldiers were part of a patrol that was returning from a visit to Jordanian peacekeepers attached to the United Nations Mission in Sierra Leone (UNAMSIL) at Masiaka on 25 August 2000 when they turned off the main road and down a track towards the village of Magbeni. There the patrol of twelve men was overwhelmed by a large number of heavily armed rebels, taken prisoner, and transported to Gberi Bana on the opposite side of Rokel Creek.

Negotiators secured the release of five of the soldiers, but were unable to gain the freedom of the remaining six and their SLA liaison officer before the West Side Boys' demands became increasingly unrealistic. Negotiators concluded that these were delaying tactics rather than an effort to resolve the crisis. By 9 September, the soldiers had been held for more than two weeks. Fearing that the soldiers would be killed or moved to a location from which it would be more difficult to extract them, the British government authorised an assault on the West Side Boys' base, to take place at dawn the following day, 10 September.

The ground operation was conducted by D Squadron, 22 Regiment Special Air Service, reinforced with a Troop from C Squadron, Special Boat Service—who assaulted Gberi Bana in a bid to extract the Royal Irish—and elements of 1st Battalion, Parachute Regiment (1 PARA), who launched a diversionary assault on Magbeni. The operation freed the six soldiers and their SLA liaison officer, as well as twenty-one Sierra Leonean civilians who had been held prisoner by the West Side Boys. At least twenty-five West Side Boys were killed in the assault, as was one British soldier, while eighteen West Side Boys—including the gang's leader, Foday Kallay—were taken prisoner and later transferred to the custody of the Sierra Leone Police. Many West Side Boys fled the area during the assault, and over 300 surrendered to UNAMSIL forces within two weeks.

The operation restored confidence in the British forces operating in Sierra Leone, which had been undermined by the capture of the Royal Irish patrol. After the operation, the British government increased its support of UNAMSIL and its efforts to bring the civil war to an end, both politically, through the United Nations Security Council, and through the provision of staff officers to support UNAMSIL. The successful use of 1 PARA in Operation Barras influenced the creation of the Special Forces Support Group—a permanent unit, initially built around 1 PARA, whose role is to act as a force multiplier for British special forces on large or complex operations.

== Background ==
Sierra Leone is a former British colony in West Africa, close to the equator, with an area of 71,740 square kilometres (27,700 square miles)—similar in size to South Carolina or Scotland, and a population of eight million. By 2000, the country had been consumed by a civil war which had begun in 1991. The West Side Boys (Note: The West Side Boys derived their name from New York gang culture and were known to themselves as the "West Side Soldiers" or sometimes the "West Side Niggaz", which they changed to "West Side Boys" as the latter would not be acceptable for use in news reports.) were a militia group who had been involved in the civil war. They were initially loyal to the Revolutionary United Front (RUF), the rebel army opposing the government; they later fought for the government, against the RUF, and were involved in at least one operation directed by British officers in exchange for weapons and medical supplies. But the West Side Boys refused to integrate into the reconstituted Sierra Leone Army and began operating as bandits from the abandoned villages of Magbeni and Gberi Bana, on opposite sides of Rokel Creek in the Port Loko District.

British forces were deployed to Sierra Leone in May 2000, initially for a non-combatant evacuation operation under the codename Operation Palliser, in which they were tasked with evacuating foreign nationals—particularly those from the United Kingdom, other Commonwealth countries, and others for whom the British government had accepted consular responsibility. As part of the mission, British forces secured Sierra Leone's main airport, Lungi. Having secured Freetown and Lungi, and evacuated the foreign nationals who wished to leave, the initial forces left and were replaced by a "Short Term Training Team" (STTT), whose mission was to train and rebuild the Sierra Leone Army. The STTT was initially formed from a detachment from 2nd Battalion, The Royal Anglian Regiment, who were replaced in July 2000 by 1st Battalion, The Royal Irish Regiment (1 R IRISH).

The Special Air Service (SAS) is a corps of the British Army and part of the United Kingdom's special forces. It consists of three regiments, of which two are drawn from the Territorial Army and one regular regiment—22 Regiment, which was involved in Operation Barras. The SAS was formed by Colonel David Stirling in Africa in 1941, at the height of the Second World War's North African Campaign. Its original role was to penetrate enemy lines and strike at airfields and supply lines deep in enemy territory, first in North Africa and later around the Mediterranean and in occupied Europe. Stirling established the principle of using small teams—having realised that small, well-trained teams could sometimes prove much more effective than a unit of hundreds of soldiers. The SAS first entered the public eye after Operation Nimrod, the operation to end the Iranian Embassy siege in 1980.

The 1st Battalion, Parachute Regiment (1 PARA) is part of the British Army's infantry and, as in the SAS, applicants must undergo an additional level of scrutiny in order to be accepted. Unlike in the SAS, new recruits to the army can apply to join the Parachute Regiment directly from the Infantry Training Centre at Catterick in Yorkshire (in the case of soldiers) or the Royal Military Academy, Sandhurst (for officers). The regiment, whose personnel are commonly known as "paras", specialises in parachute and other types of airborne insertion, and has close ties to the SAS, providing more of its personnel than any other regiment.

== Capture of the Royal Irish patrol ==
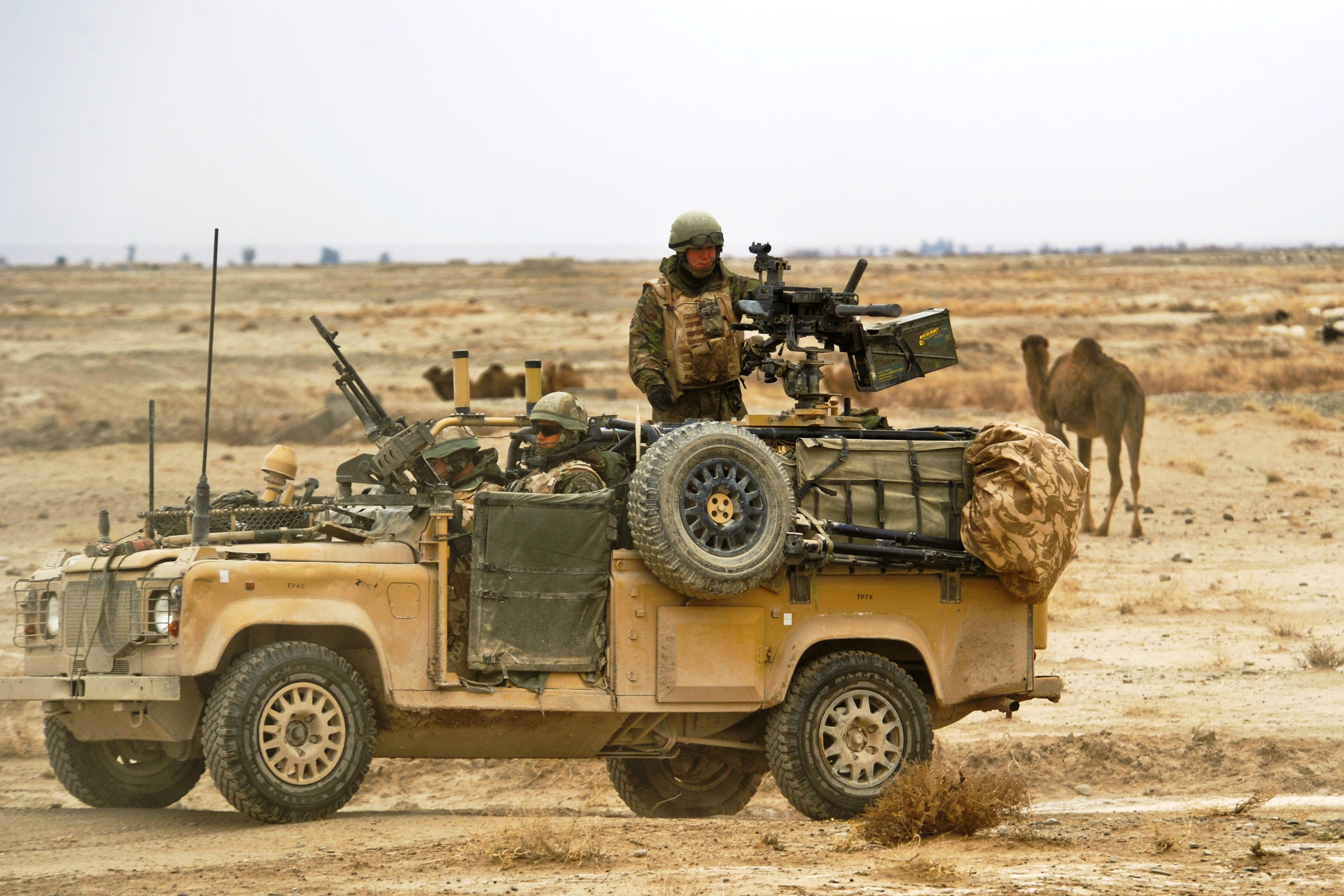
A Land Rover with Weapons Mount Installation Kit ("Wimik"), similar to the vehicles used by the Royal Irish patrol, this one in service with the RAF Regiment

On 25 August 2000, a patrol led by Major Allan Marshall consisting of 11 men from the 1 R IRISH and an official from the Sierra Leone Army acting as interpreter, Lieutenant Musa Bangura, left their base in Waterloo to visit Jordanian peacekeepers attached to the United Nations Mission in Sierra Leone (UNAMSIL) and based at Masiaka. Over lunch, they were informed that the West Side Boys had begun to disarm, despite their initial reluctance, and Marshall decided to take the patrol to investigate en route back to their base.

The patrol turned off the main road onto a dirt track that led to the village of Magbeni, where the West Side Boys were based. As they approached the base, they were surrounded by a large group of West Side Boys, who used an anti-aircraft gun mounted on a Bedford truck to block the patrol's route. Marshall dismounted his vehicle, then resisted an attempt to grab his rifle and was beaten. He and the rest of the patrol were then forced into canoes at the bank of Rokel Creek and transported to Gberi Bana, a village on the other side of the river, just upstream from the point of the initial confrontation.

British forces in Sierra Leone were operating on the authority of the Sierra Leone government, but President Ahmad Kabbah allowed British forces to negotiate for the soldiers' release themselves, as his government lacked the requisite expertise. The negotiations were led by Lieutenant Colonel Simon Fordham, commanding officer of 1 R IRISH, who was assisted by a small team which included hostage negotiators from the Metropolitan Police.

The West Side Boys would not allow negotiators any closer to the village of Magbeni than the end of the track from the main road, so Fordham met there with the self-styled "Brigadier" (Note: Some West Side Boys had served as soldiers or junior officers in the Sierra Leone Army, but they styled themselves with grand titles and awarded themselves inflated ranks.) Foday Kallay, the gang's leader, to negotiate for the soldiers' release.

On 29 August, Fordham demanded proof that the captive soldiers were still alive, and Kallay brought with him to that day's meeting the two officers from the group—Marshall, the company commander, and Captain John Laverty, the regimental signals officer. During the meeting, Laverty shook hands with Fordham and covertly passed him a sketch map of Gberi Bana which detailed the layout of the village and the building in which the soldiers were being held.

Two days later, on 31 August, five of the eleven hostages were released in exchange for a satellite telephone and medical supplies. The OC of the captured soldiers had originally decided to release the youngest first, but this was changed to the married men last minute. Out of the married men the West Side Boys wanted two of them to remain due to their signals experience. The released soldiers included the Sergeant Major, two corporals and two rangers. The West Side Boys told the British negotiators that the remaining captured soldiers which included the OC, a Captain, a Sergeant, a Lance Corporal and two Rangers that they would not be released until the gang's remaining demands were met. The released soldiers were flown for debriefing to RFA Sir Percivale, of the Royal Fleet Auxiliary, off the coast.

After the release of the soldiers, the West Side Boys' spokesman, the self-styled "Colonel Cambodia", used the satellite telephone to contact the British Broadcasting Corporation (BBC) for a lengthy interview in which they outlined a series of demands, including a re-negotiation of the Lomé Peace Accord and the release of prisoners held by the Sierra Leone authorities. The BBC had prior warning from the Foreign Office that the interview would take place. "Colonel Cambodia" quickly depleted the batteries in the telephone, but his call to the BBC enabled specialists from the Royal Corps of Signals to determine the exact position of the telephone.

== Deterioration ==
The West Side Boys were unstable, possibly due to use of cannabis and cocaine, and their behaviour during the crisis was erratic. After their release, the five soldiers described an incident in which Kallay, dissatisfied with their explanation, conducted a mock execution in which he threatened to shoot the soldiers unless they told him why they had entered the West Side Boys' territory. Media reported that the gang's drug habits also posed a problem for the British negotiators as their cannabis use allegedly caused them to forget previous discussions and the cocaine made them distrustful.

During the negotiations, the relatives of several of the West Side Boys were brought to the gang's camp to ask them to release the British soldiers. The gang responded that they had nothing against the soldiers, but that holding them had brought attention to their demands—which now included immunity from prosecution, safe passage to the UK to take up university courses, and guaranteed acceptance to the re-formed Sierra Leone Army.

=== Military planning ===
Around the time that the five soldiers were released, two negotiators from the SAS joined Fordham's negotiating team. One of them joined Fordham in several meetings with the West Side Boys, posing as a Royal Irish major in order to provide reconnaissance and gather intelligence in case an assault was required. Shortly after the patrol's capture Surgeon Lieutenant Jon Carty RN, the medical officer on board HMS Argyll—which was operating off the coast—was brought ashore to assess the soldiers, should they be freed, or to provide immediate care in the event of an assault resulting in casualties. Argyll also served as a temporary base for two Army Air Corps Lynx attack helicopters from No. 657 Squadron which had been flown to Sierra Leone to support any direct action.

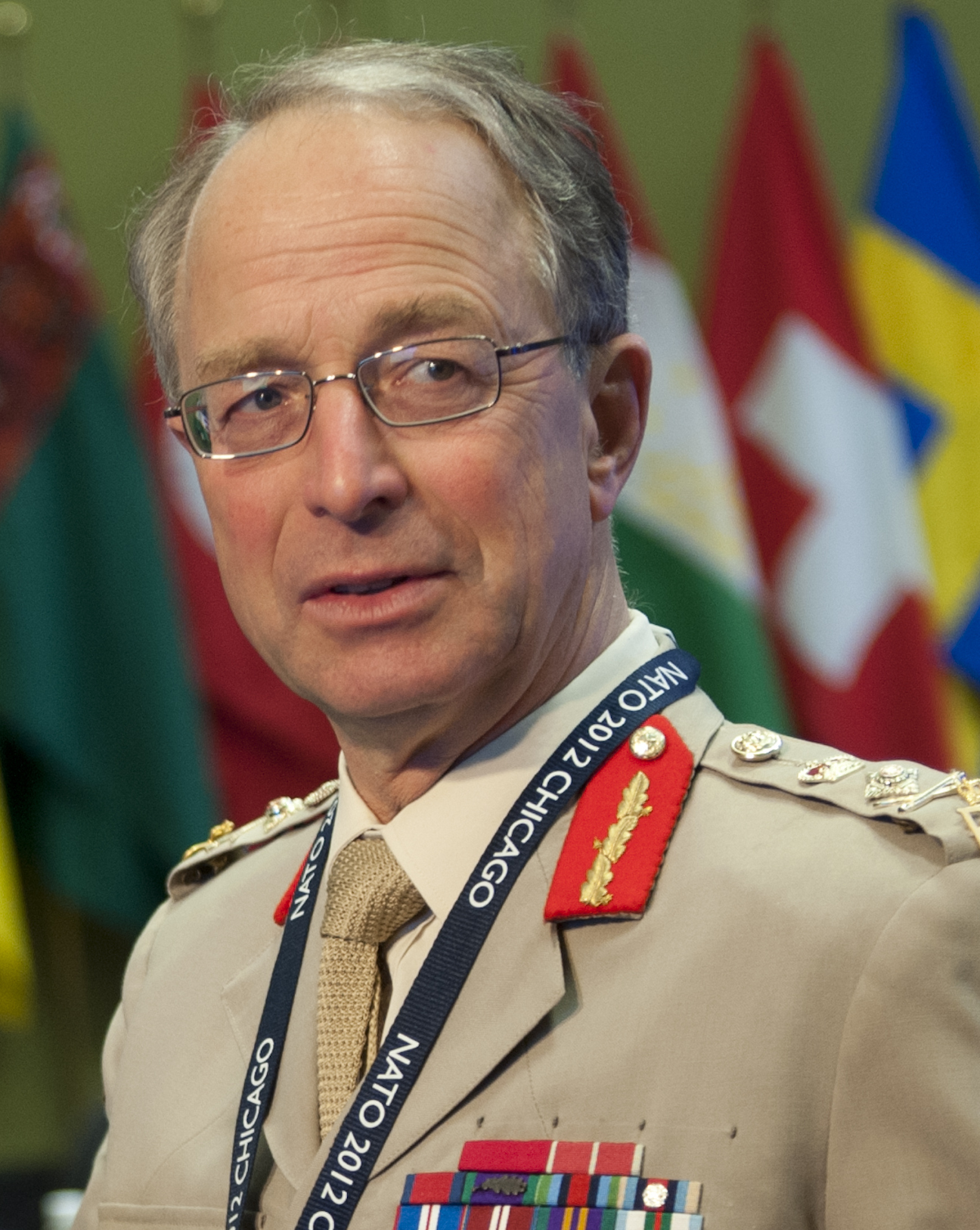
General Sir David Richards (then a brigadier), was commander of British forces in Sierra Leone in 2000.

As planning for a potential military operation to release the captive soldiers progressed, it became clear that, given the number of West Side Boys and their separation between two locations (Gberi Bana as well as the village of Magbeni; see below), the operation could not be conducted by special forces alone. Thus, the headquarters of 1st Battalion The Parachute Regiment (1 PARA) was ordered to assemble an enhanced company group, which would support special forces if such an operation was launched. The battalion's commanding officer selected A Company, led by Major Matthew Lowe, which had been on exercise in Jamaica at the time of the initial British deployment to Sierra Leone.

Several members of A Company were new recruits who had only completed basic training two weeks prior. Lowe decided that replacing them with more experienced soldiers would risk undermining the cohesion and morale of the company, but several specialist units from elsewhere in 1 PARA were attached to A Company to bring the company group up to the required strength, including a signals group, snipers, heavy machine gun sections, and a mortar section. The additional firepower was included to maximise the options available to the planners, given that the West Side Boys had a numerical advantage and that additional resources would not be immediately available should the operation run into difficulties.

On 31 August, the company group was ordered to move to South Cerney in Gloucestershire, under the cover story that they were conducting a "readiness to move" exercise. It was only at this point, and after all mobile telephones had been confiscated to ensure operational security, (Note: Operational security was tight throughout the preparations for Operation Barras—even the negotiating team were not informed that the operation was going to take place. Several rumours emerged that the Royal Irish were warned of the assault, including one that they were warned with the cryptic statement "Sally and Sarah send their regards and so does Dawn" (the SAS are coming at first light). Given the level of operational security, these rumours are almost certainly myths.) that the entire company was briefed on the operation that was being planned. With the operation becoming more likely to be launched, Lowe and his planning group flew to Dakar, Senegal, on 3 September to continue planning and to study intelligence gathered from SAS patrols operating near the West Side Boys' camp.

The British government feared that deployment of forces to Sierra Leone might precipitate an adverse reaction by the West Side Boys against the captive soldiers. They calculated that it would take 14 hours to launch an assault from the United Kingdom should it be required in an emergency, so the remainder of the company group was also moved to Dakar in order to reduce the response time.

In order to further reduce the response time, political authority to launch the assault in an emergency was delegated to the British High Commissioner in Freetown, Alan Jones, while the military decision was delegated to Brigadier David Richards, commander of British forces in Sierra Leone. Two days later, a pair of SAS observation teams (one on each side of Rokel Creek) were inserted near the villages by assault boats manned by the Special Boat Service (SBS)—the Royal Navy's special forces unit. They began monitoring the West Side Boys' movements and gathering intelligence, such as details of weapons, as well as identifying viable landing sites for helicopters.

With the progression of the plans, the enhanced A Company was tasked with planning for an assault on the village of Magbeni, to the south of Rokel Creek, while the SAS would aim to release the captive Royal Irish soldiers by assaulting Gberi Bana, on the north bank. The Magbeni assault had several purposes: to neutralise weapons in the village which could disrupt the SAS operation, to distract the West Side Boys in Magbeni and prevent them from crossing Rokel Creek to interfere with the operation in Gberi Bana, to defeat the West Side Boys and destroy their military capabilities, and to recover the Royal Irish patrol's vehicles.

Several methods of insertion were considered, both for the paras and the special forces personnel, including an overland approach using four-wheel drive vehicles, and a water-borne insertion using the same method by which the SAS observation teams had arrived at their position. The planning group decided that the overland approach would not allow troops to enter the village undetected, largely due to the West Side Boys' roadblocks on the road into the village, and that insertion from Rokel Creek was not feasible for large numbers of troops due to the sandbanks and powerful currents in the river. Thus, it was decided that the insertions would be made from three Royal Air Force Special Forces Chinook helicopters from No. 7 Squadron, which had been in Sierra Leone since the beginning of Operation Palliser.

=== Deployment to Sierra Leone ===
By 5 September, the British media was openly speculating on the possibility that an operation would be launched to free the remaining soldiers, having picked up on 1 PARA's heightened readiness. The following day, the media was reporting that British forces had arrived in Sierra Leone "as a contingency". The British special forces kept a low profile, as was traditional, and the media interest surrounding 1 PARA allowed D Squadron, 299 Signal Squadron, 22 SAS to enter Sierra Leone unnoticed.

The enhanced A Company group—approximately 130 troops in total—arrived in the country in several groups and joined the SAS, who had already established a base in Hastings, a village 30 miles (48 kilometres) south of Freetown, where several of the paras recognised former colleagues among the troopers from D Squadron. At Hastings, the paras focused on live firing exercises and rehearsed various scenarios in a scale replica of Magbeni which had been constructed at the camp.

As well as learning the layout of the village and refining battle technique, the rehearsals allowed the soldiers to acclimate to the tropical heat, and led commanders to the decision that the paras would go into battle with minimal equipment to reduce the risk of heat exhaustion—excluding weapons and ammunition, they would carry only water and field dressings. Some officers feared that the weight of body armour would increase the risk of heat exhaustion, but commanders hoped that the cooler temperatures of the early morning (when the operation was planned to be launched) would mitigate the effects of the weight, and decided to order its use.

A day after the arrival of the paras, Director Special Forces (DSF), Brigadier John Holmes, arrived in Freetown with a headquarters staff which included the commanding officer of 22 SAS and the officer commanding D Squadron, as well as three personnel from the Royal Air Force's Tactical Communications Wing. Holmes based himself at Seaview House, the British military headquarters in Freetown, near the British High Commission. From there, his staff established contact with the SAS observation teams on either side of Rokel Creek and with COBR, (Note: COBR is a British government committee convened to handle national crises. The committee is named after the room in which it meets—the Cabinet Office Briefing Room—known as "COBR" but sometimes referred to as "COBRA" or "Cobra". Similarly to the SAS, COBR first became known to the public during the Iranian Embassy siege.) the British government's emergency committee in London. The DSF, who usually attends COBR meetings during crises which may require the use of special forces, was represented by his chief of staff and by Lieutenant Colonel Tim Collins, (Note: Tim Collins, late of the Royal Irish Regiment, was serving as operations officer under the DSF during Barras. Officers serving with special forces usually return to their parent regiment after their tour of duty, and Collins' next duty was as commanding officer of 1 R IRISH.) operations officer at Headquarters Special Forces.

== The operation ==
=== Decision to launch ===
On 9 September, "Colonel Cambodia" stated that the remaining six members of the Royal Irish patrol, who had now been held for over a fortnight, would be released only after a new government was formed in Sierra Leone. The negotiators concluded that the West Side Boys' increasingly unrealistic demands were stalling tactics rather than a serious attempt to conclude the crisis. At around the same time, the SAS teams near the West Side Boys' base reported that they had seen no sign of the captive soldiers during the four days they had been in position. There were also concerns that the West Side Boys might move further inland, and either kill the soldiers or move them to a location from which it would be more difficult for British forces to extract them. The combination of these factors led COBRA to order an assault.

The operation was to commence at first light the next day, 10 September. The intervening time was spent securing the political and legal basis for the raid. Final approval was gained from Sierra Leonean President Ahmad Kabbah, and British Prime Minister Tony Blair, while the Army Legal Corps secured approval from the Sierra Leonean Police. Fordham, who had been leading the negotiations, telephoned the West Side Boys and was able to establish that the captive soldiers were alive, and the final orders were issued in the evening of 9 September.

The two villages were to be assaulted simultaneously—Gberi Bana, where the Royal Irish were held, by the SAS and Magbeni by an SAS team and the paras. In addition to the remaining Royal Irish soldiers, the SAS were also tasked with extracting Lieutenant Musa Bangura—the patrol's SLA liaison, whose extraction was given the same priority as that of the Royal Irish—and a group of Sierra Leonean civilians who were being held by the West Side Boys.

=== Assault ===
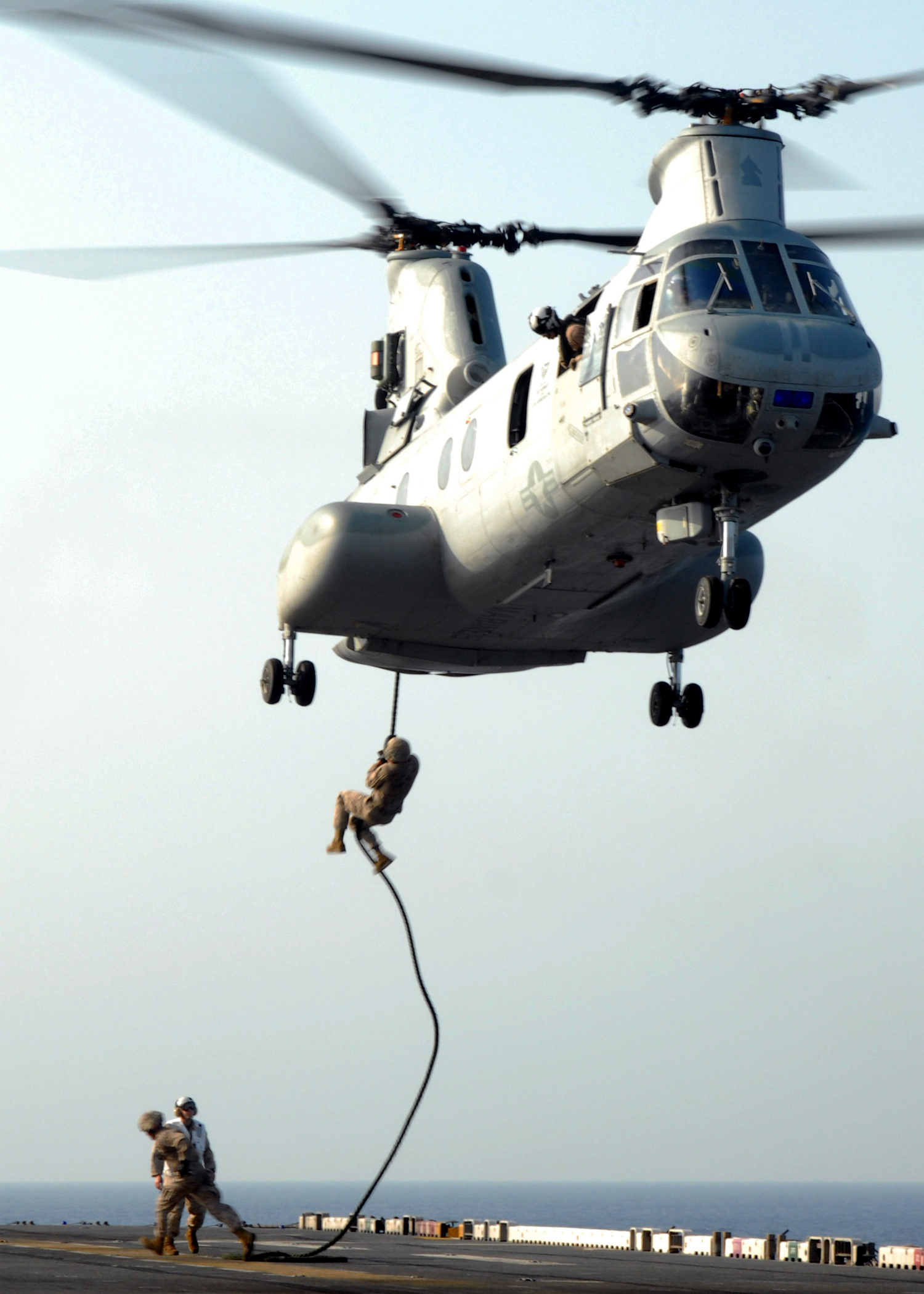
US Marines fast-roping from a Sea Knight—the same insertion technique used by the SAS at Gberi Bana

The task force left Hastings—approximately 15 minutes' flying time from the West Side Boys' camp—at approximately 06:15. Downstream from the villages—approximately 15 minutes' flying time, just out of the West Side Boys' visual and hearing range—the helicopters went into a holding pattern to allow the SAS observation teams time to get into position to prevent the West Side Boys from attacking any of the captives before the extraction teams were on the ground. Once the observation teams were in position, the helicopters proceeded up the line of Rokel Creek, the Chinooks flying low enough that the downdraft tore off the corrugated iron roofs of several huts in the villages, including the roof of the building in which the Royal Irish were being held.

As the helicopters approached, the SAS observation team at Gberi Bana engaged West Side Boys in the vicinity of the captives to prevent any gang members from attempting to kill them before the area was secured. Upon their arrival, the Chinooks opened fire using the M134 Miniguns mounted on the front doors whilst the two Lynx attack helicopters strafed the villages to make the landing zones as safe as possible, and destroy the heavy weapons that had been identified by the SAS observation teams.

==== Gberi Bana ====
After the first sweep by the attack helicopters, two Chinooks carried the SAS to Gberi Bana. The troopers fast-roped into the village and immediately came under fire from the West Side Boys. Early on in the confrontation, the British operation sustained its first casualty—a round entered Trooper Bradley Tinnion's flank, leaving him seriously injured. He was dragged back to the helicopter and flown to the medical team aboard the RFA Sir Percivale, dying despite intensive resuscitation attempts on board. The SAS proceeded to clear the village, engaging those West Side Boys who offered resistance and capturing those who surrendered, including Foday Kallay.

The SAS located the captive British soldiers from the latter's shouts of "British Army, British Army!", though Bangura had been held separately and proved more difficult to locate. He was found in a squalid open pit, which had been used by the West Side Boys as a lavatory, and had been starved and beaten during his captivity, and thus had to be carried to the helicopter. Less than 20 minutes after the arrival of the SAS, the remaining members of the Royal Irish patrol, including Bangura, had been evacuated from the area.

As the SAS operation concluded, the Chinooks ferried prisoners and bodies from Gberi Bana to the Jordanian battalion of UNAMSIL. From there, the bodies would be identified and buried, and those prisoners identified as West Side Boys would be handed over to the Sierra Leonean Police. Operation Barras also freed 22 Sierra Leonean civilians who had been held captive by the West Side Boys—the men were used as servants and put through crude military training by the West Side Boys, possibly with the intention of forcing them to fight in the future, while the women were used as sex slaves. Planners had been concerned that West Side Boys might try to conceal themselves among the civilians and so the civilians were also restrained and taken to the Jordanian peacekeepers' base to be identified. A 23rd civilian was caught in the crossfire and killed during the assault.

==== Magbeni ====
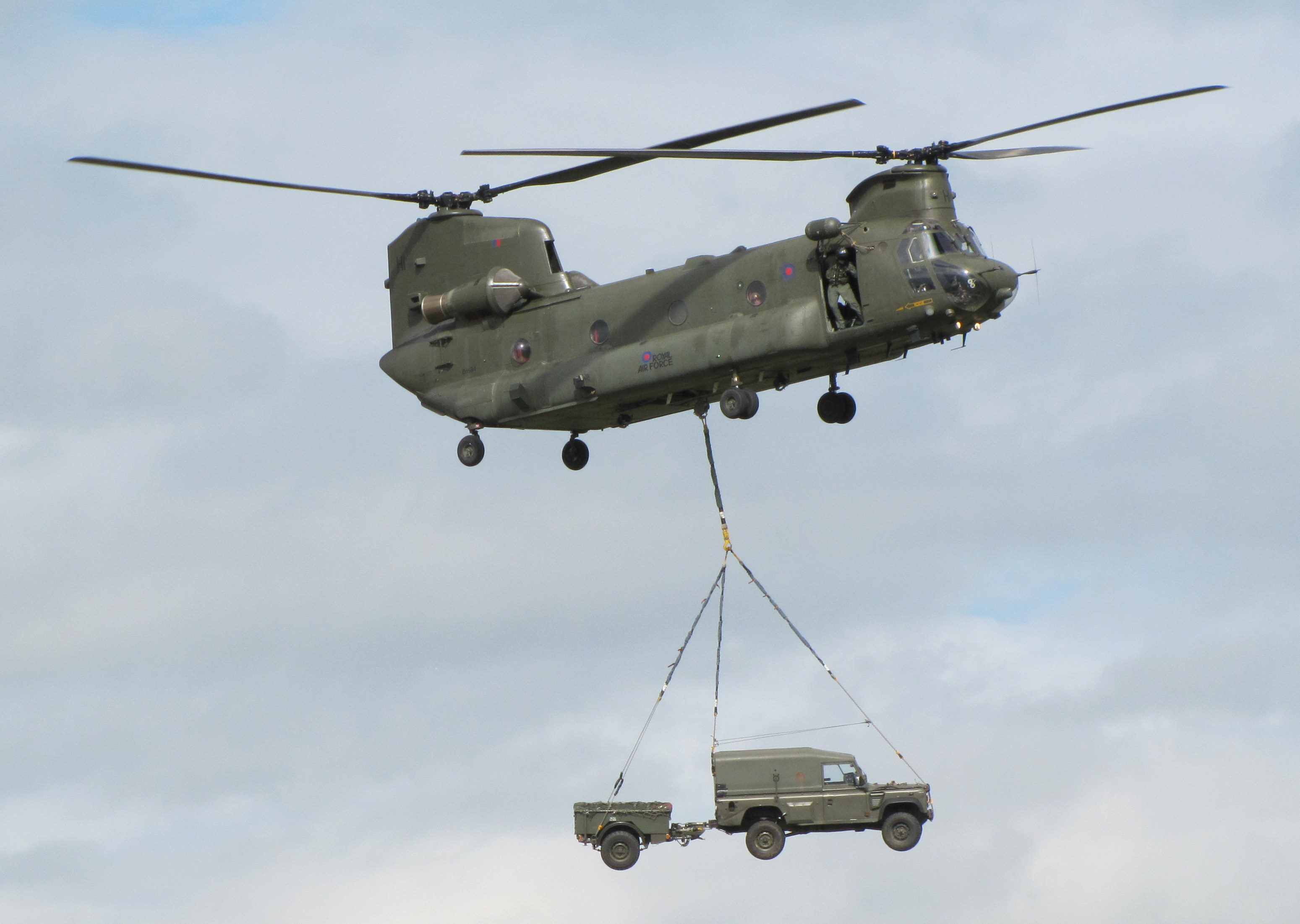
An RAF Chinook with underslung Land Rover, a procedure used to retrieve the Royal Irish patrol's vehicles from Magbeni

The third Chinook carried half of the enhanced A Company group from 1 PARA, and an SAS team to Magbeni. The helicopter hovered low above the landing zone that had been identified by the second SAS observation team and the troopers jumped from the rear ramp. The observation team had warned that the ground was wet but had been unable to determine the depth of the water, so the troopers were surprised to find themselves jumping into a chest-deep swamp. The majority of the first group immediately waded through the swamp to get to the nearby tree line and from there to the village, but a small party tasked with securing the landing zone had to wait in the swamp for the Chinook to pick up the remaining members of the company group and return to insert them at the landing zone.

The returning Chinook, carrying the remainder of the A Company group including second-in-command (2IC) Captain Danny Matthews, came under fire from a heavy machine gun in Magbeni. It then returned fire from its door-mounted M134 Miniguns before being promptly joined by one of the 657 Squadron Lynx helicopters which strafed the HMG until it ceased firing. The soldiers in Matthews' helicopter exited and joined the first half of the company group on the ground. As the company group moved forward, an explosion—possibly a mortar fired by the British fire support group—injured seven men, including company commander Major Matthew Lowe, one of the platoon commanders, a signaller, and two of Lowe's headquarters staff.

Another signaller radioed in a casualty report, and one of the Chinooks en route to Gberi Bana to extract the Royal Irish (who had just been freed by the SAS) landed on the track through the village. The casualties were loaded onto the helicopter, which then picked up the Royal Irish and flew to RFA Sir Percivale where all 13 men were assessed by medics.

The operation continued under the leadership of Matthews, the company 2IC, who had taken command almost immediately after the company commander was wounded. Under his command, each of the platoons assaulted a different cluster of buildings to which they had been assigned during training on the replica village at Hastings. The West Side Boys' ammunition store was found and secured and, once the rest of the buildings had been cleared, the paras took up defensive positions to block any potential counter-attack and patrols went into the immediate jungle in search of any West Side Boys hiding in the bushes.

The village was completely secure by 08:00 and the paras secured the approaches with Claymore mines and mortars positioned to prevent a counter-attack, while a detachment destroyed the remaining vehicles and heavy weapons including the Bedford lorry which had blocked the Royal Irish patrol. The paras also recovered the Royal Irish patrol's Land Rovers, which were slung under the Chinooks and removed. The last British soldiers left the area at approximately 14:00.

==== Conclusion of the assault ====
The remaining members of the captured patrol were flown to RFA Sir Percivale. Fordham visited the men shortly after the operation and stated "they looked remarkably well considering the ordeal they had been through" and described them as being "physically and mentally exhausted". After medical checks, the soldiers, who had been held for 17 days, were allowed to telephone their families and then rejoined their battalion in Freetown. The paras were flown to RFA Argus where they spent the night before being flown back to the United Kingdom the next day. D Squadron, 22 SAS also left Sierra Leone the day after the operation, along with Director Special Forces and his headquarters staff.

== Aftermath ==
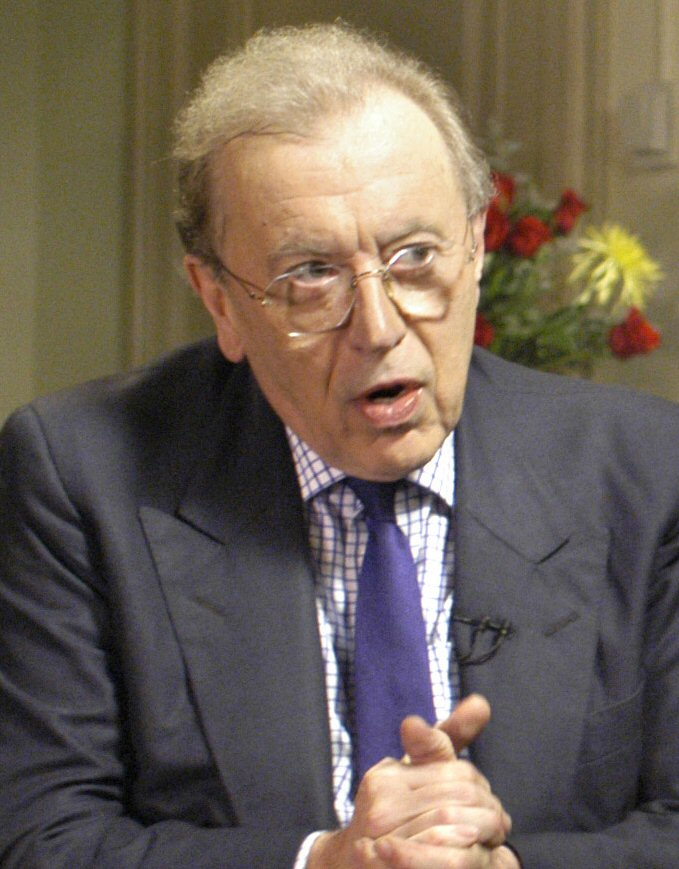
Talk show host Sir David Frost, who broke the news of Operation Barras to the British public

The operation was the first time in its history that the SAS had been deployed to rescue other members of the British Army. One British soldier, Bradley Tinnion, died after being wounded during the operation, having been evacuated to HMS Argyll. Another twelve soldiers were injured, one seriously. The British Ministry of Defence (MoD) did not officially acknowledge the involvement of special forces, issuing a press release which made no mention of the SAS, but when it was made public that Tinnion was a Lance Bombardier originally from 29 Commando Regiment Royal Artillery, it became clear to experts that Tinnion had been serving with special forces. Operation Barras was Tinnion's first operational deployment as an SAS trooper.

Confirmed to have died in the operation were 25 West Side Boys, although the true figure is probably higher, possibly as many as 80. The gang's resistance was stronger than expected and there was speculation that more bodies lay undiscovered in the jungle. Several other West Side Boys were captured, while others fled into the jungle. Many of those who fled later surrendered to Jordanian peacekeepers. The Jordanians had received 30 by the end of the day, and 371—including 57 children—had surrendered within a fortnight of Operation Barras, to which Julius Spencer, Sierra Leone's Minister for Information, declared that the West Side boys were "finished as a military threat".

Some of those who surrendered went on to volunteer for the new Sierra Leone Army and those who were accepted went into the British-run training programme. Kallay, the gang's leader, recorded a message for broadcast on Sierra Leonean radio urging the remaining West Side Boys to surrender to UNAMSIL. He also identified the bodies of West Side Boys killed in Magbeni and Gberi Bana, which were subsequently buried in a mass grave.

The morning of the operation, General Sir Charles Guthrie, Chief of the Defence Staff (CDS)—the professional head of the British Armed Forces—was coincidentally due to appear on Breakfast with Frost, a Sunday morning political television programme hosted by Sir David Frost. The first public knowledge of Operation Barras came from Guthrie's interview with Frost, which took place while the operation was still concluding. Guthrie told Frost "[W]e didn't want to have to assault, because it's a very difficult operation, there are big risks in it but we have done it [...] because our negotiations were getting nowhere. The hostages had been there for three weeks, they [the West Side Boys] were threatening to kill them, or they were threatening to move them to other parts of Sierra Leone and once they'd done that we'd never be able to recover [the soldiers] with ease, which I hope we've done this morning". The MoD issued a press release with more details later in the day.

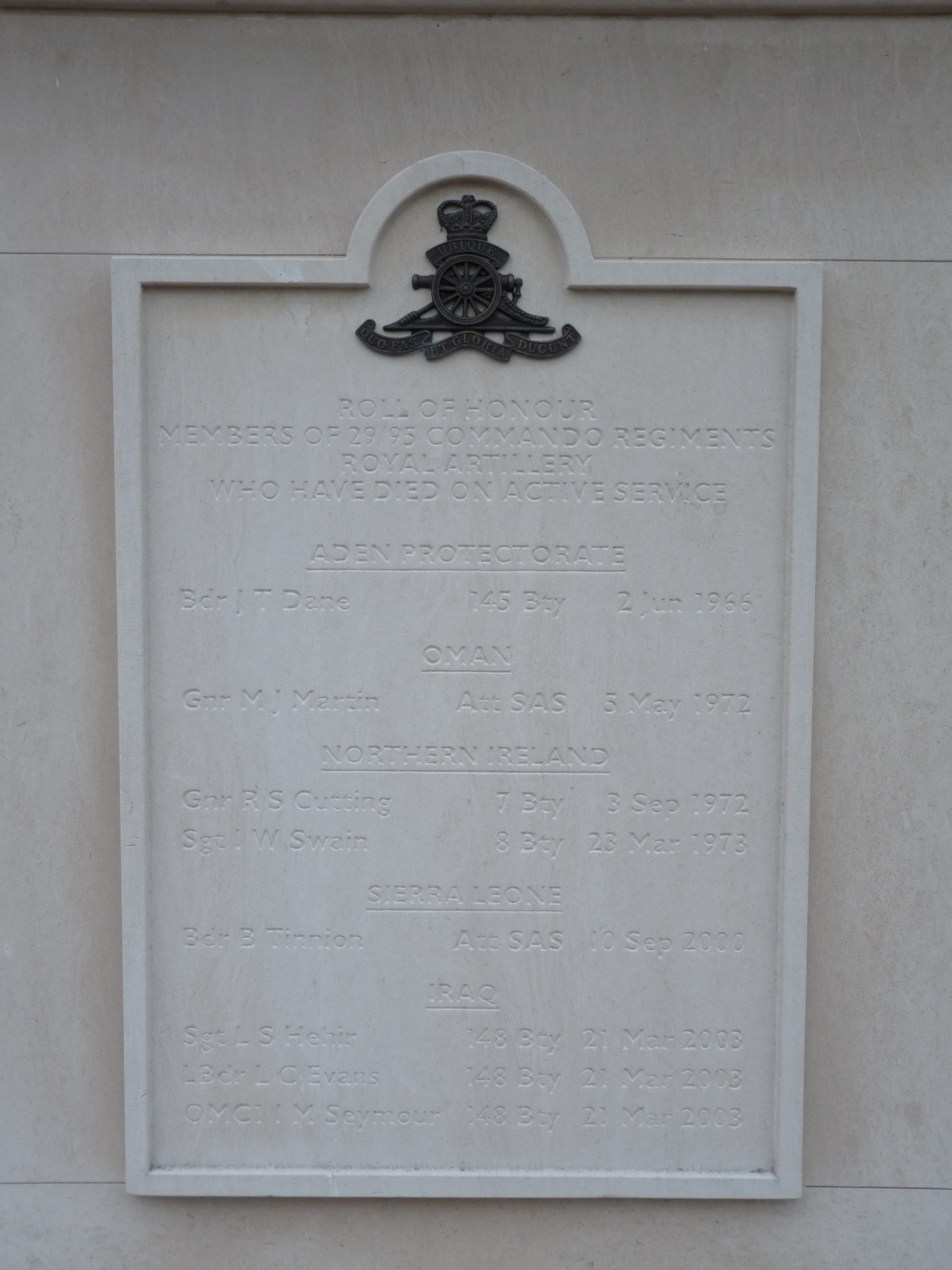
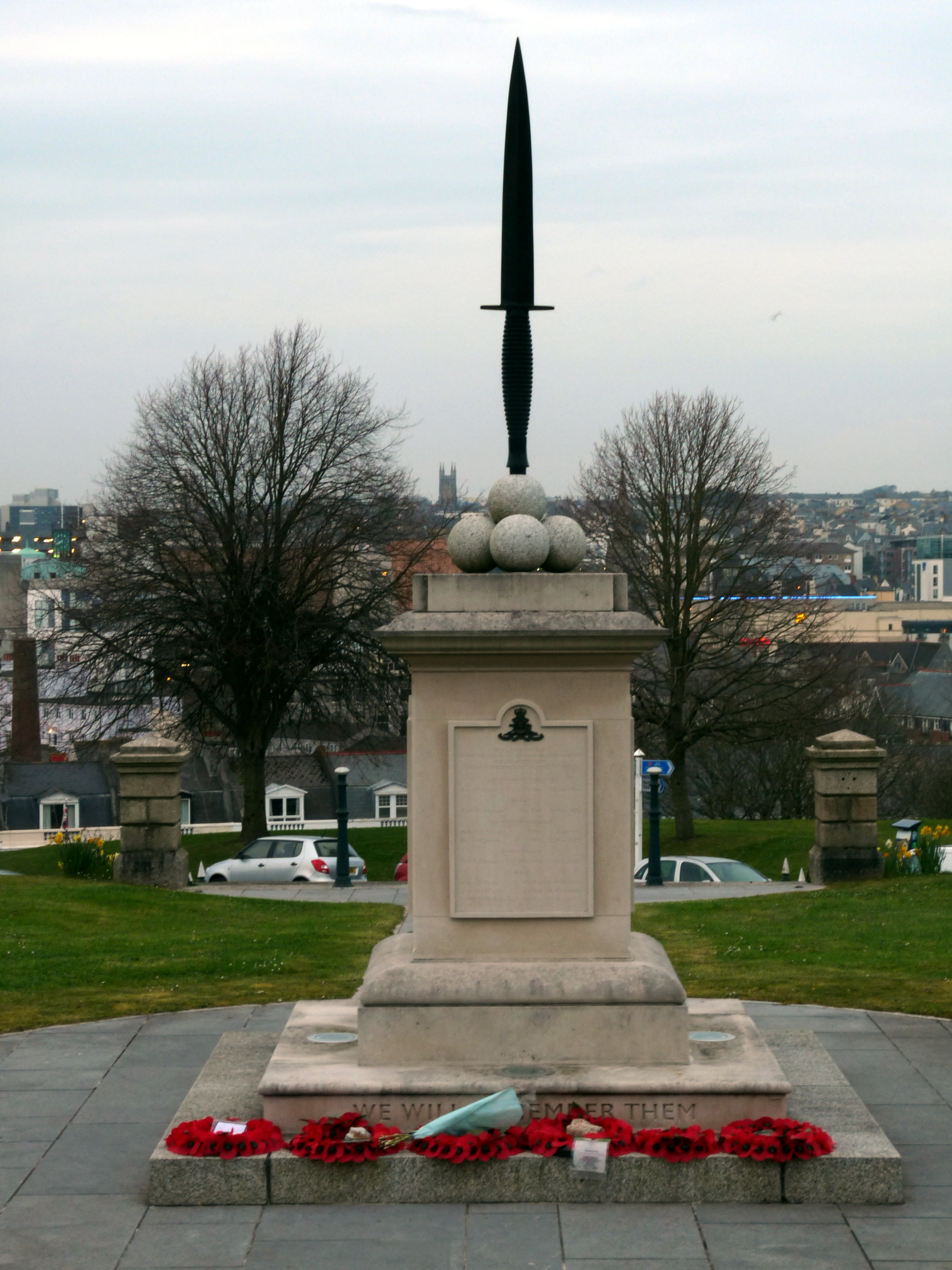
Memorial to 29 Commando Regiment Royal Artillery (Tinnion's unit prior to being attached to the SAS) in Plymouth, bearing Tinnion's name

Several decorations were awarded to the personnel who took part in Operation Barras, including two Conspicuous Gallantry Crosses (Parachute Regiment Colour Sergeant John David Baycroft and Royal Air Force Squadron Leader Iain James McKechnie MacFarlane), five Military Crosses (Parachute Regiment Warrant Officer Class 2 Harry William Bartlett, Major James Robert Chiswell, Captain Evan John Jeaffreson Fuery, Sergeant Stephen Michael Christopher Heaney, and Acting Captain Daniel John Matthews), and five Distinguished Flying Crosses (Royal Air Force Flight Lieutenant Timothy James Burgess, Squadron Leader Iain James McKechnie MacFarlane, Flight Lieutenant Jonathan Priest, Flight Lieutenant Paul Graham Shepherd, and Army Air Corps Captain Allan Laughlan Moyes). Holmes (Director Special Forces) was awarded the Distinguished Service Order for his part in the operation. Tinnion received a posthumous Mention in Despatches.

Marshall was later transferred to another regiment at his own request, while two of the soldiers on the patrol subsequently left the army and another two transferred to "Home Service" units (those based permanently in Northern Ireland).

== Long-term impact ==
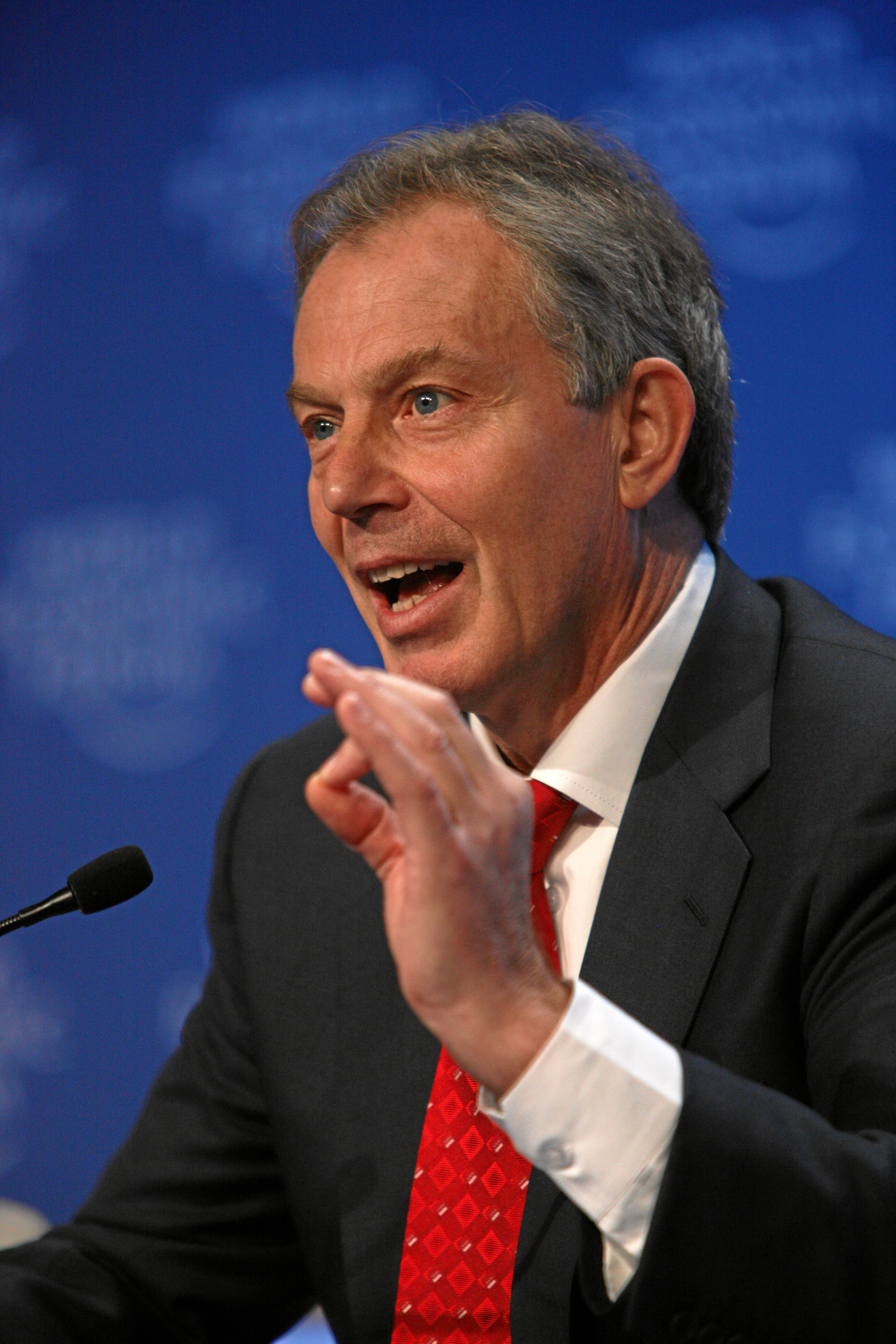
Tony Blair, then British prime minister, authorised Operation Barras and ordered the original intervention in Sierra Leone by British forces.

The capture of the Royal Irish patrol had undermined the confidence of the Sierra Leonean population in the British operation, which they hoped would help to bring an end to the country's civil war, and embarrassed the British government, which had been critical of similar previous incidents involving UNAMSIL personnel. Operation Barras restored confidence in the British forces, prompting military historian William Fowler to call the operation "a necessarily spectacular endorsement of the rule of law and the elected government of Sierra Leone".

The British media struck a celebratory note at the success of Operation Barras, but some suggested that Marshall had erred in diverting the patrol off the main road to visit the West Side Boys. Both Marshall and Bangura—the patrol's Sierra Leone Army liaison—were adamant that the patrol had been asked by the Jordanian peacekeepers serving with UNAMSIL to, in Bangura's words, "take a closer look". The commander of UNAMSIL—General Mohamed Garba of Nigeria—initially denied that the Royal Irish had met the Jordanians and both UNAMSIL HQ and the Jordanian commanding officer denied that the patrol were asked to investigate the West Side Boys' camp.

An investigation into the capture of the patrol was launched by Land Command and a senior officer was despatched to Freetown to debrief the members of the patrol. The report was critical of Marshall, stating that he "made an error of professional judgement in diverting from a planned and authorised journey to make an unauthorised visit to the village of Magbeni."

The risks of Operation Barras were acknowledged by the MoD and by officers involved in the planning and the assault. It was described by an SAS soldier as "not a clinical, black balaclava, Princes Gate type operation. It was a very grubby, green operation with lots of potential for things to go wrong". Richard Connaughton observed in the journal Small Wars & Insurgencies that the operation showed that Tony Blair's government was not averse to the possibility of casualties where they felt the cause was just.

Geoff Hoon, British Secretary of State for Defence, summed up the effect of the operation at a press conference, stating that "[Operation Barras] sends a number of powerful messages. Firstly, it is a yet further demonstration of the refusal of successive British governments to do deals with terrorists and hostage takers. Secondly, we hope the West Side Group [sic] and other rebel units in Sierra Leone will now [...] accept the rule of law and the authority of the democratically elected government of Sierra Leone. Thirdly, we hope all those who may in future consider taking similar actions against UK armed forces will think carefully about the possible consequences and realise there is nothing to be gained by such action".

Andrew M. Dorman of King's College London suggested that the fate of the wider British operation in Sierra Leone depended heavily on the success or failure of Operation Barras and that, had the British forces been defeated, the United Kingdom would have been forced to withdraw all its forces from Sierra Leone. Dorman also suggests that a defeat would have "raised questions" regarding Tony Blair's policy of using armed force for humanitarian intervention.

The success of Operation Barras was a factor in the decision to form the Special Forces Support Group (SFSG), a permanent unit whose role is to act as a force multiplier for British special forces on large or complex operations. The SFSG was formed in 2006 from an infantry battalion—initially 1 PARA—with supporting elements from the Royal Marines and Royal Air Force Regiment. The SFSG went on to support special forces operations in Afghanistan and Iraq.

The capture of the Royal Irish patrol and the effectiveness of the operation to free them prompted the British government to increase its support of UNAMSIL, both politically and through the provision of staff officers to assist UNAMSIL's operational headquarters (though not with a significant contribution of peacekeepers, despite considerable lobbying). The British also applied political pressure through the United Nations Security Council on the Revolutionary United Front (RUF)—the second main party to the civil war after the government—and on Sierra Leone's neighbour Liberia, which had provided support to the RUF. The new approach, combined with a larger and more powerful UNAMSIL, hastened the demobilisation of the RUF and thus the end of the Sierra Leone Civil War.

== See also ==
- Operation Khukri, similar operation to rescue two companies of Indian soldiers
