= RAF Tern Hill =

Former Royal Air Force station in Shropshire, England

RAF Tern Hill
- Near Market Drayton, Shropshire in England
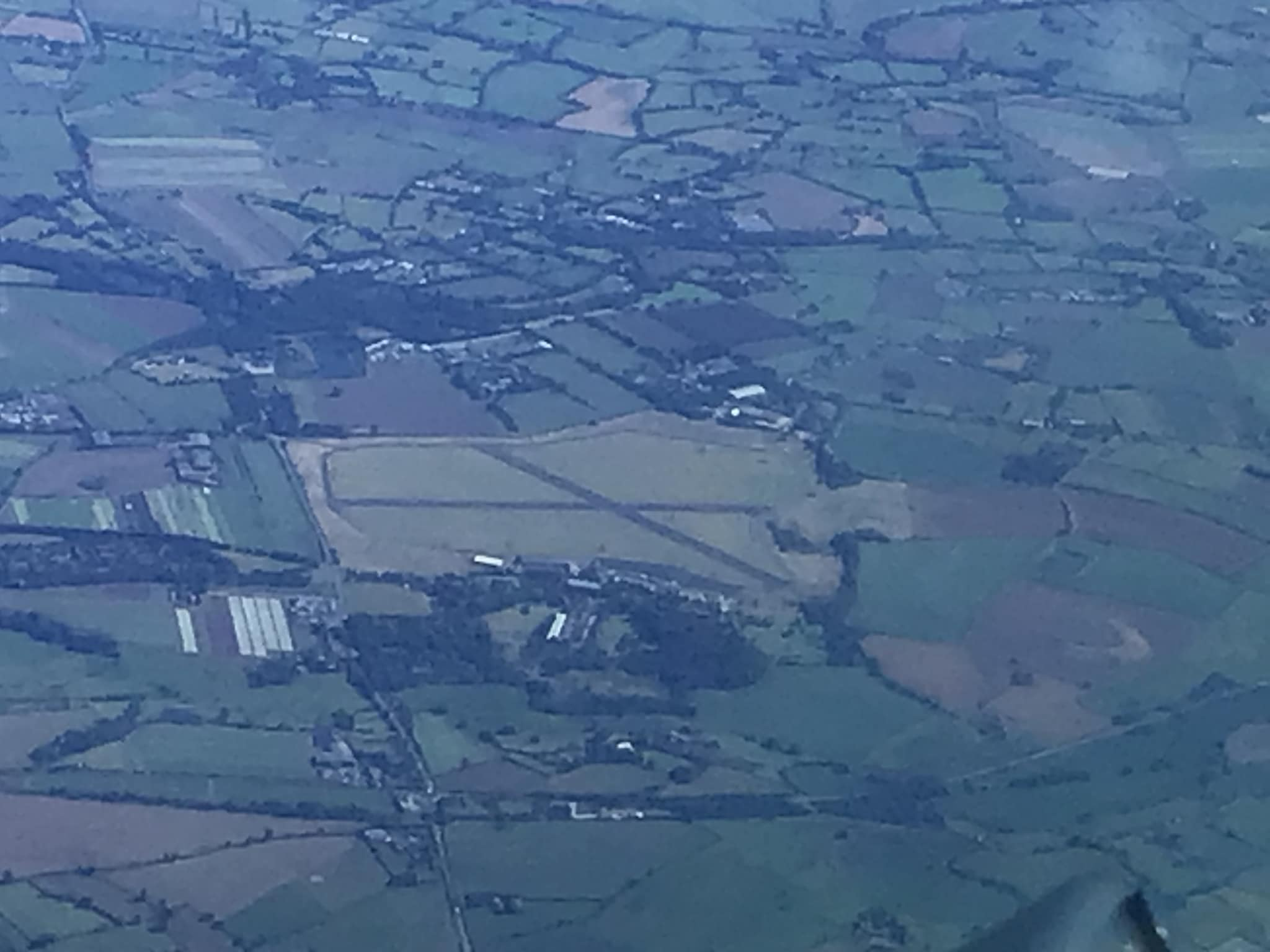
- The airfield at Ternhill.

Site information
- Type: Royal Air Force flying station
- Owner: Ministry of Defence
- Operator: Royal Flying Corps (1916–1918); RAF (1918–1922 and 1935–1976)
- Condition: Open

Location
- Location in Shropshire
- Coordinates: 52°52′16″N 002°32′01″W
- Area: 111 hectares

Site history
- Built: 1916
- In use: 1916–1976
- Fate: Technical and administrative site transferred to the British Army and became Borneo Barracks, later renamed Clive Barracks.; Airfield retained by the RAF for use as a relief landing ground for the No 1 Flying Training School at RAF Shawbury.

Airfield information
- Identifiers: ICAO: EGOE
- Elevation: 83 metres (272 ft) AMSL
Runways
Direction	Length and surface
04/22	980 metres (3,215 ft) Asphalt
10/28	948 metres (3,110 ft) Asphalt
17/35	822 metres (2,697 ft) Grass

Royal Air Force Tern Hill, or more simply RAF Tern Hill, (ICAO: EGOE) was a Royal Air Force station at Ternhill in Shropshire, England, near the towns of Newport and Market Drayton.

The station closed in 1976, with the technical and administrative site transferring to the British Army to become Borneo Barracks, later renamed Clive Barracks (after Major-General Robert Clive). The airfield part of the site was retained by the RAF and is now known as Tern Hill Airfield. It is predominantly used as a relief landing ground for helicopters of the No 1 Flying Training School, based at RAF Shawbury. The airfield is also home to the RAF's No. 632 Volunteer Gliding Squadron.

== History ==
=== First World War ===
The airfield was first opened in 1916 and was initially operated by the Royal Flying Corps before being taken over by its successor the Royal Air Force (RAF) on 1 April 1918.

The first squadron posted to RFC Tern Hill was 95 Squadron RFC from 8 October 1917 with various aircraft being moving to Shotwick on 30 October 1917.

The next three squadron all arrived on 1 March 1918 and used various aircraft the squadrons were then transferred from the RFC to the RAF on 1 April 1918.

- 133 Squadron RFC/RAF between 1 March 1918 and 4 July 1918.
- 134 Squadron RFC/RAF between 1 March 1918 and 4 July 1918.
- 132 Squadron RFC/RAF between 1 March 1918 and 19 August 1918.

On 1 April 1918 No. 13 Training Depot Station was posted to Tern Hill staying until March 1919.

The last two squadrons which were posted here had a status of cadre:

- 87 Squadron RAF between 9 February 1919 and 24 June 1919
- 19 Squadron RAF between 18 February 1919 and 31 December 1919.

The land was sold off in 1922 for use as a race horse stable.

=== Second World War ===
In 1935 the land was again requisitioned and the airfield was re-built and three Type-C hangars were erected on the main airfield. The first based flying unit was No. 10 Flying Training School which formed on 1 January 1936 and remained until it was transferred to Canada in late 1940. A site for a Maintenance Unit was created on the south-east side of the airfield and this opened on 1 June 1937 for use by No. 4 Aircraft Storage Unit, later renamed No. 24 Maintenance Unit.

The first based operational squadron was No. 78 Squadron RAF which flew from Tern Hill as an detachment flying the Armstrong Whitworth Whitley IVA from June 1939 until August 1939.

Tern Hill then turned into a fighter airfield with Supermarine Spitfires and Hawker Hurricanes with the first fighter squadron arriving on 10 October 1939. The squadron was No. 611 (West Lancashire) Squadron AAF with the Spitfire I and stayed until 13 December 1940. During that period, which covered the Battle of Britain, the airfield was attacked by the Luftwaffe, when 10 bombs were dropped in July 1940 without causing casualties. The next squadron was No. 46 Squadron RAF with the Hurricane I as a detachment from the main squadron which was based at RAF Digby in Lincolnshire. The detachment arrived on 13 June 1940 and stayed until 1 September 1940. The next squadron in residence was No. 306 Polish Fighter Squadron with their Hurricane I's from 7 November 1940 staying until 3 April 1941.

On 30 May 1941 a new squadron arrived in the shape of No. 403 Squadron RCAF with flew three versions of the Spitfire, the marks I, IIA and VB. The squadron moved to RAF Hornchurch on 4 August 1941. During late March 1941 No. 605 (County of Warwick) Squadron AAF moved in with their Hurricane IIA's but they only stayed for two months leaving on 30 May 1941.

The last fighter squadron to be posted to Tern Hill was No. 131 (County of Kent) Squadron RAF which arrived on 6 August 1941 with their Spitfire IA and IIA's before leaving on 27 September 1941.

The airfield then began to host training units such as No. 5 (Pilot) Advanced Flying Unit which arrived on 1 April 1942 and left on 12 April 1946.

The following units were posted to RAF Tern Hill at some point:

- No. 10 Flying Training School RAF between 1 January 1936 and 1 November 1940
- No. 4 Aircraft Storage Unit between 1 June 1937 and 10 February 1938
- No. 24 Stores Unit between 10 February and 28 March 1938
- No. 15 Personnel Transit Centre between 23 August 1939 and unknown
- Training Command Communication Flight RAF between September 1939 and 12 January 1940
- No. 25 Group Communication Flight RAF between March 1940 and 23 April 1947
- No. 5 Service Flying Training School RAF between 16 November 1940 and 1 April 1942
- A detachment of No. 6 Anti-Aircraft Co-operation Unit RAF between 2 April and 1941
- A detachment of No. 52 Operational Training Unit between September 1942 and October 1942
- No. 22 Group Communication Flight RAF between 1 August 1943 and 1 April 1964
- No. 10 Service Flying Training School RAF
- 29th Training Wing
- No. 30 Maintenance Unit RAF

In 1942 the maintenance unit site was renamed RAF Stoke Heath.

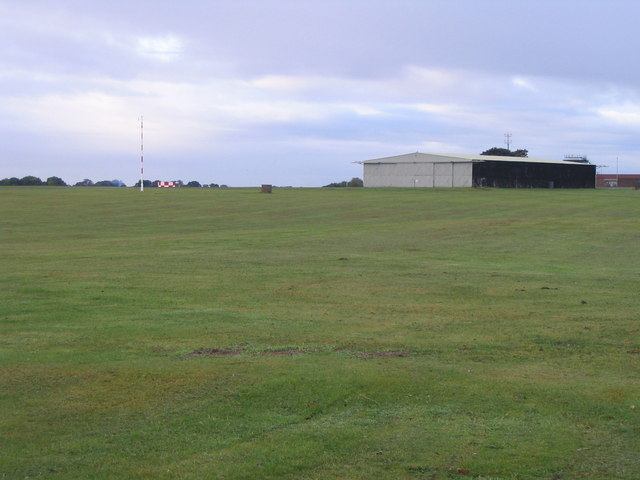
Airfield at RAF Ternhill

=== Postwar ===
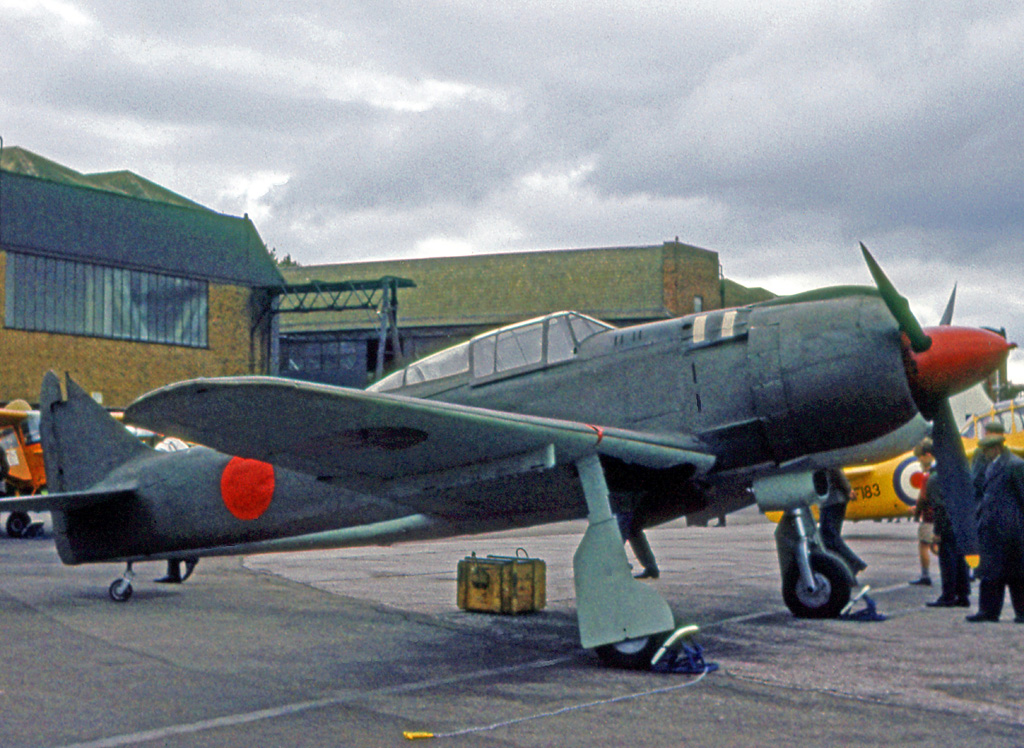
RAF Tern Hill in 1962 with the main station hangars at the rear. A preserved Japanese Kawasaki Ki-100 is displayed in the foreground.

From 30 April 1946 Tern Hill was the home of No. 6 Flying Training School RAF equipped with North American Harvards, receiving Percival Prentices in late 1948 and from July 1953 Percival Provost T.1 piston engine training aircraft replaced both types. Tern Hill was one of the RAF stations that provided the first stage of the, then, new Provost/de Havilland Vampire pilot training programme. However, on 24 July 1961 the school moved out and the space was quickly filled by the Central Flying School Helicopter Wing which moved in on 18 August 1961.

In 1962 No. 3 Mobile Glider Servicing Party was posted to Tern Hill to prepare to assist No. 632 Volunteer Gliding School which was posted to Tern Hill on 6 October 1963. During March 1976 CFSHW was posted to another airfield and was replaced by No. 2 (Advanced) Flying Training School RAF on 1 March. However, their stay was short: on 8 October 1976 the unit was posted elsewhere and the site was used by as a relief landing ground (RLG) which lasted until 30 March 1997.

=== Closure ===
The site closed as an RAF station on 31 December 1976, with the technical and administrative parts transferring to the British Army to become Borneo Barracks, later renamed Clive Barracks (after Major-General Robert Clive).

The airfield part of the site was retained by the RAF and is now known as Ternhill Airfield. It has since been used for helicopter training, initially by No. 2 Flying Training School and after 1997 the Defence Helicopter Flying School, based at RAF Shawbury. The airfield is also home to the RAF's No. 632 Volunteer Gliding Squadron (however it is temporarily relocated to RAF Woodvale due to ongoing construction work to repair their hangar) and the RAFAC's No. 639 Aerospace Ground School.

== See also ==
- List of Royal Air Force stations
