= Royal Irish Regiment (1992) =

Infantry regiment of the British Army

Royal Irish Regiment (27th (Inniskilling) 83rd, 87th and The Ulster Defence Regiment)
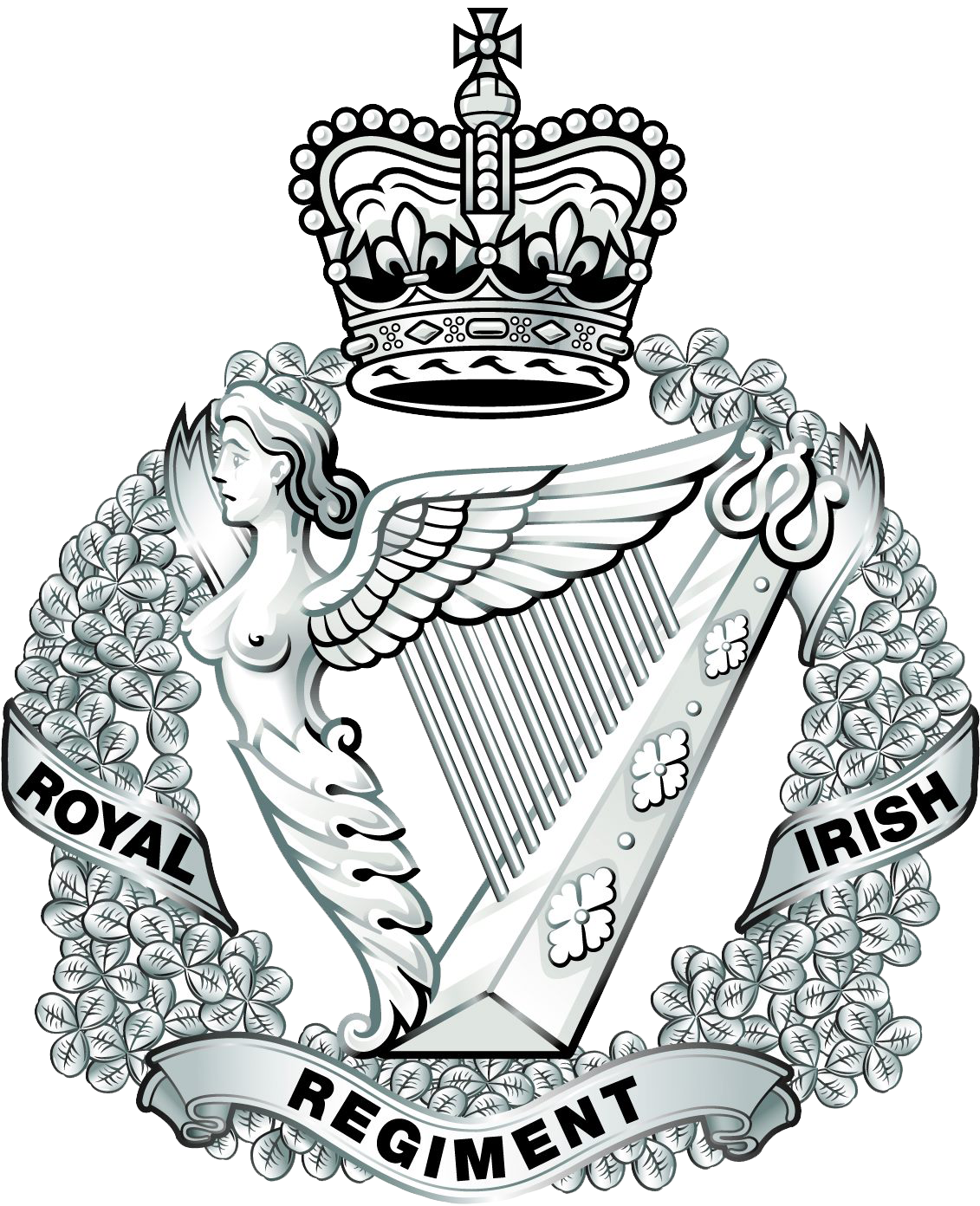
- Crest of the Royal Irish Regiment
- Founded: 1 July 1992
- Country: United Kingdom
- Branch: British Army
- Type: Light infantry
- Role: 1st Battalion – Light Recce; 2nd Battalion – Light infantry (Army Reserve)
- Size: Two battalions
- Part of: Union Division
- Garrison/HQ: RHQ – Holywood; 1st Battalion – Ternhill; 2nd Battalion – Lisburn
- Mottos: "Faugh A Ballagh" (Irish) "Clear the Way"
- Colours: Green, Black
- March: Quick – Killaloe; Slow – Eileen Alannah
- Mascots: Vacant, usually an Irish Wolfhound (Brian Boru)
- Anniversaries: Barrosa Day, 5 March; Somme Day, 1 July
- Engagements: Kosovo War; Sierra Leone Civil War; Operation Banner; Iraq War; War in Afghanistan

Commanders
- Colonel-in-Chief: Sophie, Duchess of Edinburgh
- Colonel of the Regiment: Major General Colin Weir
- Commanding Officer 1st Battalion: Lieutenant Colonel Andy Bourne MBE
- Notable commanders: Col Tim Collins

Insignia
- DZ Tactical Recognition Flash
- Tartan: Saffron (pipes)
- Headdress: Green Caubeen
- Cap Badge: Irish Harp with Crown
- Hackle: Green; From Royal Irish Rangers, originally from Royal Irish Fusiliers
- Abbreviation: R IRISH

The Royal Irish Regiment (27th (Inniskilling), 83rd, 87th and The Ulster Defence Regiment) (R IRISH) is a light infantry regiment of the British Army. The regiment was founded in 1992 through the amalgamation of the Royal Irish Rangers and the Ulster Defence Regiment. Their oldest predecessor, the 27th Regiment of Foot, was first raised in June 1689 to fight in the Williamite War in Ireland. Other notable regiments in their lineage include the Royal Inniskilling Fusiliers, Royal Irish Rifles and the Royal Irish Fusiliers (Princess Victoria's).

The motto of the regiment is Faugh A Ballagh (Modern Irish: Fág an Bealach), derived from the Irish Gaelic phrase for "Clear the Way". This originates from the Peninsular War when Sergeant Patrick Masterson of the 87th Regiment of Foot let out the cry while capturing a French Imperial Eagle at the Battle of Barrosa. The Regimental Headquarters of the Royal Irish Regiment has been Palace Barracks in County Down, Northern Ireland since moving there in 2008.

== History ==
With an antecedence reaching back to 1688, the regiment was formed in 1992. The creation followed the Options for Change proposals which recommended the amalgamation of the Royal Irish Rangers and the Ulster Defence Regiment (UDR). Most of the membership of the new regiment came from the UDR. This produced an overwhelmingly Ulster Protestant regiment with eleven battalions:

- Regular Army – General Service
  - 1st Battalion, Royal Irish Regiment
  - 2nd Battalion, Royal Irish Regiment
- Territorial Army
  - 4th Battalion, Royal Irish Rangers
  - 5th Battalion, Royal Irish Rangers
- Regular Army – Northern Ireland Resident Battalions (Home Service)
  - 3rd (County Down) Battalion, Royal Irish Regiment
  - 4th (County Fermanagh and County Tyrone) Battalion, Royal Irish Regiment
  - 5th (County Londonderry) Battalion, Royal Irish Regiment
  - 6th (County Armagh) Battalion, Royal Irish Regiment (former 2nd/11th Battalion UDR)
  - 7th (City of Belfast) Battalion, Royal Irish Regiment
  - 8th (County Tyrone) Battalion, Royal Irish Regiment
  - 9th (County Antrim) Battalion, Royal Irish Regiment

The Home Service battalions, permanently based in Northern Ireland, filled the role formerly occupied by the UDR, assisting the Royal Ulster Constabulary (with a focus on combating militant Irish republicanism), in Northern Ireland during Operation Banner. The 1st and 2nd Battalions could serve worldwide as general service battalions.

Because of its size, the regiment was removed from the King's Division and existed within its own division of infantry. In August 1993, the two regular battalions were amalgamated as the 1st battalion.

In 2000 in Sierra Leone, whilst deployed to train government troops, eleven Royal Irish soldiers and their local army liaison officer were captured by the West Side Boys insurgents. Five hostages were later released and the remaining six were freed by the Special Air Service and The Parachute Regiment during Operation Barras, with the West Side Boys suffering severe casualties in the action.

The Colonel-in-Chief, the Duke of York presented the regiment new colours to St Patrick's Church of Ireland Cathedral in Armagh on 16 June 2001; there is a plaque commemorating this event in the south aisle.

The 1st Battalion deployed to Iraq at the beginning of Operation Telic in March 2003, where they carried out operations in the south of the country. Its (now-retired) commanding officer, Lieutenant Colonel Tim Collins was appointed an Officer of the Order of the British Empire for distinguished service.

The number of Home Service battalions were reduced to three by April 2003:

- 2nd Battalion – amalgamation of 7th and 9th Battalions
- 3rd Battalion – amalgamation of 3rd and 8th Battalions
- 4th Battalion – amalgamation of 4th and 5th Battalions

In 2005, the Provisional Irish Republican Army announced an end to its armed campaign. In response the British government announced the end of Operation Banner, and with it the disbandment of the Home Service battalions. A redundancy package was announced in March 2006. The Home Service battalions were awarded the Conspicuous Gallantry Cross (CGC) by the Queen in Belfast on 6 October 2006. The home service battalions were declared non-operational in October 2006, and disbanded in July 2007. At the same time, the Royal Irish Rangers, then serving as the TA battalion, was renamed as 2nd Battalion, Royal Irish Regiment.

The 1st Battalion returned from six months in Iraq on Op TELIC VI/VII in May 2006 having served in the Shaibah Logistics Base near Basra. Although the majority of the battalion was deployed around the MND(SE) area a single company was deployed to Baghdad.

Three platoons of the 1st Battalion (Barrosa, Somme and Ranger Platoons) deployed to Afghanistan in 2006, as part of 16 Air Assault Brigade and supported 3rd Parachute Regiment, the latter forming 9 Platoon, C Coy, 3 PARA. They were involved in some of the heaviest fighting during HERRICK IV. Lance Corporal Paul Muirhead, Lance Corporal Luke McCulloch and Fijian Ranger Anare Draiva were killed by the Taliban during HERRICK IV.

In summer 2007 the Regimental Headquarters moved from St Patrick's Barracks, Ballymena to Palace Barracks, Belfast.

Both battalions deployed to Afghanistan in 2008, as part of 16 Air Assault Brigade. The 1st battalion provided Operational Mentoring and Liaison Teams (OMLTs) to assist in training the Afghan National Army (ANA) and Afghan National Police (ANP), and the 2nd battalion were the first Territorial Army company strength grouping to provide OMLT training from NATO forces. They were also the first TA Company to fully man Forward Operating Bases (FOBs) within the green zone. One company of the 1st Battalion, attached to 2 PARA, named Ranger Company, undertook offensive operations in the Sangin area of Helmand Province. The 1st Battalion lost Ranger Justin Cupples to an improvised explosive device (IED) during HERRICK VIII.

Both battalions again deployed with 16 Air Assault Brigade to Afghanistan on HERRICK XIII from September 2010. Based in the southern part of Helmand, they lost Lance Corporal Stephen McKee, Ranger Aaron McCormick and Ranger David Dalzell during HERRICK XIII.

Under the Defence in a Competitive Age programme and subsequent Future Soldier, the 1st Battalion will transfer to the 16 Air Assault Brigade.

== Structure ==
The 1st Battalion (1 R IRISH) is a Light Recce Strike Infantry unit and comes under the 16 Air Assault Brigade Combat Team. Its personnel are based at Clive Barracks in Tern Hill.

The 2nd Battalion (2 R IRISH) is an Army Reserve infantry unit and comes under the 19th Brigade. It is headquartered at Thiepval Barracks in Lisburn.

== Recruitment ==
The regiment recruits from Northern Ireland, and those across the UK with Irish ancestry.

Restrictions in Ireland's Defence Act make it illegal to induce, procure or persuade enlistment of any citizen of Ireland into the military of another state.

== Operational honours ==
=== Iraq ===
- Corporal Trevor Raywood Coult, Military Cross
- Lieutenant Richard Gordon Deane, Military Cross.

=== Afghanistan ===
- Lieutenant Colonel Colin Richard James Weir, MBE, Distinguished Service Order
- Lance Corporal Ratu Apenisa Qalitakivuna, Military Cross
- Acting Sergeant Alwyn John Stevens, Conspicuous Gallantry Cross
- Corporal Robert William Kerr McClurg, Conspicuous Gallantry Cross
- Lance Corporal Jone Bruce Toge, Conspicuous Gallantry Cross
- Captain Douglas Ricardo Beattie, Military Cross
- Captain David Bradley Rainey, Military Cross
- Sergeant Stephen McConnell, Military Cross
- Ranger Alan William Owens, Military Cross

== Elizabeth Cross and Memorial Scrolls ==
Up to May 2010, 32 Elizabeth Cross and Memorial Scrolls have been issued to the families of Royal Irish personnel.

== Traditions ==
In memory of a 2006 battle in the Afghan town of Musa Qala, a new Regimental March, composed by Chris Attrill and commissioned by Larne Borough Council, was given to the regiment on Saturday 1 November 2008 in Larne, County Antrim, during an event in which the regiment was also presented with the 'Freedom of the Borough'. This gives the regiment the right to march through the town with "flags flying, bands playing and bayonets fixed". The March was named Musa Qala.

The uniform combines elements of the uniform of the Royal Irish Rangers with the harp-and-crown cap badge of the Ulster Defence Regiment.

Sticks made of blackthorn are carried by commissioned officers of the Royal Irish Regiment.

== Colonel-in-Chief ==
- 1992–2022: Vice Admiral Prince Andrew, Duke of York, KG GCVO CD FRS
- 2023–present: Sophie, Duchess of Edinburgh GCVO GCStJ CD

== Regimental Colonels ==
Colonels of the regiment have been:

- 1992–1996: Gen. Sir Charles Richard Huxtable
- 1996–2001: Gen. Sir Roger Neil Wheeler
- 2001–2013: Lt-Gen. Philip Trousdell
- 2013–2018: Brig. Joseph S.S. O'Sullivan
- 2018–present: Major General Colin Weir

== Order of precedence ==
Preceded by Royal Welsh	Infantry Order of Precedence	Succeeded by The Parachute Regiment

== Lineage ==
1880	1881 Childers Reforms	1921 Name changes	1957 Defence White Paper	1966 Defence White Paper	1990 Options for Change	2003 Delivering Security in a Changing World
27th (Inniskilling) Regiment of Foot	The Royal Inniskilling Fusiliers			The Royal Irish Rangers (27th (Inniskilling), 83rd and 87th)		The Royal Irish Regiment
108th (Madras Infantry) Regiment of Foot	The Royal Inniskilling Fusiliers			The Royal Irish Rangers (27th (Inniskilling), 83rd and 87th)		The Royal Irish Regiment
83rd (County of Dublin) Regiment of Foot	The Royal Irish Rifles	The Royal Ulster Rifles		The Royal Irish Rangers (27th (Inniskilling), 83rd and 87th)		The Royal Irish Regiment
86th (Royal County Down) Regiment of Foot	The Royal Irish Rifles	The Royal Ulster Rifles		The Royal Irish Rangers (27th (Inniskilling), 83rd and 87th)		The Royal Irish Regiment
87th (Royal Irish Fusiliers) Regiment of Foot	Princess Victoria's (Royal Irish Fusiliers)	The Royal Irish Fusiliers (Princess Victoria's)		The Royal Irish Rangers (27th (Inniskilling), 83rd and 87th)		The Royal Irish Regiment
89th (Princess Victoria's) Regiment of Foot	Princess Victoria's (Royal Irish Fusiliers)	The Royal Irish Fusiliers (Princess Victoria's)		The Royal Irish Rangers (27th (Inniskilling), 83rd and 87th)		The Royal Irish Regiment
				The Ulster Defence Regiment		The Royal Irish Regiment

== Alliances ==
- United States – 101st Airborne Division
- Canada – The Princess Louise Fusiliers
- Canada – 2nd Battalion, Irish Regiment of Canada
- Australia – Adelaide University Regiment
- New Zealand - 2nd Canterbury, and Nelson-Marlborough and West Coast Regiment
- South Africa – Andrew Mlangeni Regiment
- Gibraltar – Royal Gibraltar Regiment
- Pakistan – 1st Battalion, Punjab Regiment
- Pakistan – 9th Battalion, Frontier Force Regiment
- Royal Navy – HMS Bulwark
