= Magbeni =

- Village
- Location in Sierra Leone
- Coordinates: 8°33′00″N 12°49′01″W
- Country: Sierra Leone
- Province: North West Province
- District: Port Loko District

Population (2000)
  - Total: 400
- Time zone: UTC-5 (GMT)

Magbeni is a village in the Port Loko District of the North West Province of Sierra Leone, and is a part of the Koya chiefdom within the district. The village was part of Operation Barras, a rescue mission involving the British Army and the West Side Boys militia group who occupied the village.

== Economy ==
Sand mining is the main industry in the village, which is mainly used for construction purposes.
