= John Sutherell =

British Army general

Major General John Sutherell CB CBE DL
- Born: 23 October 1947 (age 78); Chatteris, Cambridgeshire
- Military career
- Allegiance: United Kingdom
- Branch: British Army
- Service years: 1968–2002
- Rank: Major General
- Service number: 485317
- Unit: Royal Anglian Regiment
- Commands: Royal Military College of Science; 8th Infantry Brigade; 1st Battalion, Royal Anglian Regiment
- Conflicts: Operation Banner
- Awards: Companion of the Order of the Bath; Commander of the Order of the British Empire

Major General John Christopher Blake Sutherell, CB, CBE, DL (born 23 October 1947) is a former British Army officer who became Commandant of the Royal Military College of Science.

== Military career ==
Educated at Christ's Hospital and Grey College, Durham, Sutherell was commissioned into the Royal Anglian Regiment in 1968. He was made commanding officer of 1st Battalion Royal Anglian Regiment in 1987 and became commander of the 8th Infantry Brigade in Northern Ireland in 1990. He went on to be Deputy Military Secretary in 1994, Director Special Forces in 1996 and Commandant of the Royal Military College of Science in 1999 before retiring in 2002.

In retirement Sutherell became General Secretary of the Officers' Association. He is also a Deputy Lieutenant of Suffolk.

Military offices
Preceded by Cedric Delves	Director Special Forces; 1996–1999	Succeeded by John Holmes
Preceded by Alistair Irwin	Commandant of the Royal Military College of Science; 1999–2002	Succeeded by Robert Baxter
