= Listed buildings in Sutton upon Tern =

Sutton upon Tern is a civil parish in Shropshire, England. It contains 24 listed buildings that are recorded in the National Heritage List for England. Of these, four are listed at Grade II*, the middle of the three grades, and the others are at Grade II, the lowest grade. The parish contains the village of Sutton upon Tern and is otherwise largely rural. The Shropshire Union Canal passes through the parish, and the listed buildings associated with it are two bridges and a milepost. In the parish are the country houses Buntingsdale Hall and Pell Wall, and another large house, Colehurst Manor, which are listed together with associated structures. The other listed buildings are farmhouses, farm buildings, a road bridge, a milestone, and a coach house and stables.

== Key ==
Grade	Criteria
II*	Particularly important buildings of more than special interest
II	Buildings of national importance and special interest

== Buildings ==
Name and location	Photograph	Date	Notes	Grade
Former farmhouse, Dairy Farm; 52.88270°N 2.47958°W	—	Late 16th century	The former farmhouse is timber framed with rendered panels, some brick nogging, and a tile roof. There are two storeys and an L-shaped plan, consisting of a cross-wing, a 17th-century hall range with two or three bays, and a 19th-century single-storey lean-to on the right. The windows are casements, and some are blocked.	II
Barn southeast of Colehurst Manor; 52.87783°N 2.50392°W	—	Mid 17th century	The barn was altered in the 18th century. The original part is timber framed on a red sandstone plinth with red brick nogging, it is partly rebuilt in red brick, and has a tile roof. There is a doorway, a loft door, the side wall has been rebuilt in brick and it contains vents.	II
Colehurst Manor; 52.87849°N 2.50489°W		1670s	The house was restored in the 19th century. It is timber framed with brick nogging, partly rendered, on a red sandstone plinth, and it has a slate roof. There are two storeys, an attic and a basement, and an H-shaped plan, consisting of a two-bay hall range and two-bay cross-wings, and there is a central stair tower at the rear. The upper storeys and gables are jettied with moulded bressumers. On the front is a gabled porch, the windows are mullioned and transomed, and there are two gabled dormers.	II*
Buntingsdale Hall; 52.88907°N 2.51448°W		1721	A country house to which an extension was added in 1857 by S. Pountney Smith. It is in red brick with red sandstone dressings, and consists of a main block and a north wing. The main block has two storeys, an attic and a basement, and fronts of nine and five bays, and the wing has two storeys and a basement and fronts of five bays. On the east front are pilasters, some of them Composite with carved capitals, and others plain and unfluted. They carry an entablature, above the middle three bays is an open pediment, and above each of the other bays is a triangular pediment. At the top is a balustraded parapet. The doorways have moulded architraves with a segmental heads and triple keystones. The windows are sashes, those in the main floors with segmental heads, and all with triple keystones.	II*
Garden wall, Buntingsdale Hall; 52.88900°N 2.51625°W	—	c. 1721	The garden retaining wall is in red brick on a plinth, with pilaster buttresses and moulded red sandstone coping. It is about 50 metres (160 ft) long with an apsidal projection to the east, and square end piers with moulded stone caps.	II
Ice house, Buntingsdale Hall; 52.88987°N 2.51648°W	—	c. 1721	The ice house is in the grounds to the northwest of the hall, and is in red brick with two chambers. One chamber is square and has a barrel vault and an oculus, and the other is circular and tapering with a domed vault. The ice house is entered through a segmental-headed passage, and a further short passage leads from one chamber to the other.	II
The Coach House and The Paddocks; 52.88966°N 2.51503°W	—	c. 1721	Formerly the coach house and stable block to Buntingsdale Hall, the building has been converted for domestic use. It is in red brick with red sandstone dressings and a hipped tile roof. There are two storeys and a U-shaped plan. The east range has chamfered quoins, a band, and a dentilled eaves cornice. Above the central three bays is a triangular pedimented gable with an octagonal clock face in the tympanum, and over that is an octagonal wooden cupola with round arches, moulded imposts and keystones, a moulded cornice, and an ogee lead dome. The central segmental-headed doorway has a rusticated surround.	II
Wall, Colehurst Manor; 52.87860°N 2.50556°W	—	18th century	The garden wall to the west of the house is in red brick on a red sandstone plinth and with red sandstone dressings. It is about 60 metres (200 ft) long, and has chamfered quoins, stone coping. At the east end is a segmental-headed doorway.	II
Holly Grove Farmhouse; 52.89128°N 2.50709°W	—	Mid 18th century	The farmhouse is in red brick with grey sandstone dressings, sill bands, a dentilled eaves cornice, and a double-span tile roof with parapeted gable ends and chamfered copings. There are three storeys and three bays. The paired doors have a plain architrave, and the windows are sashes with keystones.	II
Tyrley Castle Farmhouse; 52.89995°N 2.47891°W	—	Mid to late 18th century	A red brick house on a plinth, with a band, a dentilled eaves cornice, and a tile roof. There are two storeys and an attic, four bays, two gabled rear wings, and a single-storey sandstone lean-to on the left. The doorway has a moulded architrave and a gabled hood, and above it is an oculus. The other windows are sashes and there are two hipped eaves dormers.	II
Bird in Hand Farmhouse; 52.87474°N 2.46660°W	—	1774	The farmhouse is in red brick with red sandstone dressings on a chamfered stone plinth, with a band, a dentilled eaves cornice, and a tile roof with parapeted gable ends, moulded kneelers, and chamfered coping. There are two storeys and an attic, and three bays. The windows in the ground floor are sashes, and in the upper floor they are casements, all with segmental heads. On the front is a gabled porch and a chamfered datestone.	II
Milestone near Tern Hill House Farmhouse; 52.88645°N 2.54153°W	—	Late 18th century	The milestone is on the southeast side of the A53 road. It is in sandstone with cast iron plates, and has a triangular section and a square base. The plates on the sides are inscribed with the distances in miles to Chester and to Newport, and on the base is a plate inscribed "TERNHILL".	II
Sydnall Farmhouse and outbuildings 52.87111°N 2.47131°W	—	Late 18th century	The farmhouse is in red brick with a tile roof. It consists of a central block with two storeys and two bays flanked by one-storey one-bay pavilions. The main block has a plinth, a band, and a dentilled eaves cornice, and the roof has parapeted gable ends, moulded kneelers, and stone copings. In the pavilions are round-arched panels with impost bands and keystones. In the centre is a doorway with a segmental-headed fanlight, and the windows are casements. The left pavilion is linked to the main block by a low range and a lean-to conservatory, and the right pavilion is linked by a wall.	II
Berrisford Bridge; 52.90491°N 2.47171°W		1791	The bridge carries Berrisford Road over the River Tern. It is in red sandstone with brick soffits, and consists of a single segmental arch. The bridge has voussoirs, raised keystones, one with the date and initials, and plain parapets.	II
Buntingsdale Hall; 52.89514°N 2.47734°W		1822–28	A small country house designed by Sir John Soane. A south wing was added in 1861, the house was gutted by fire in 1986, and the main block, without the wing, has since been restored. The house is built in Grinshill sandstone with some rendered brick and a hipped slate roof. There are two storeys, an attic and a basement, and a square plan with an entrance front of three bays. This has a rusticated basement, a plinth, decorated pilaster strips, string courses, a moulded cornice and a frieze with Greek key ornament. At the top is a parapet with central balustrading and dome-shaped finial. The windows are sashes, those in the ground floor in recessed round-arched panels, and there is a flat-roofed dormer. Steps lead up to the central doorway with a moulded architrave, decorated pilaster strips, a frieze and cornice on scrolled brackets, a round-arched tympanum with a central roundel with a wrought iron lamp. In front is an ionic porch that has columns, an entablature, a frieze with paterae, and a balustraded parapet. The northwest front has five bays, a full-height bow window and three dormers.	II*
Garden buildings and walls, Pell Wall; 52.89379°N 2.48131°W	—	1822–28	The walls surround the kitchen garden, they contain the gardener's cottage and other buildings, and were designed by Sir John Soane. The walls are in red brick with grey sandstone coping, and surround a rectangular enclosure. The walls contain round archways flanked by piers with domed finials, a lean-to fruit house, a water tower, lean-to wrought iron greenhouses, and The Garden House. This has two storeys and a basement, three bays, recessed single-storey two-bay flanking wings, and a single-storey five-bay extension.	II
North Lodge, Pell Wall; 52.89877°N 2.47917°W	—	1822–28	The main lodge to the hall was designed by Sir John Soane, and was extended in about 1965. It is built in Grinshill sandstone with brick at the rear, and has a stone plinth band, a frieze with triglyphs, a moulded cornice, and a blocking course. There is one storey and a basement, and a hexagonal plan with square projections and a curved wall at the rear. The wings have tall pierced parapets, and in the centre of the roof is a hexagonal wooden lantern with a pyramidal copper cap and a lead and copper finial. The doorway has a chamfered surround, and the windows are mullioned.	II*
Pell Wall Old Lodge; 52.89379°N 2.48535°W	—	1822–28	The former back lodge to the hall was designed by Sir John Soane, and was extended to the rear in the 20th century. It is in red brick on a plinth, with pilaster strips, a recessed frieze band, and a hipped slate roof. There is one storey and a front of three bays. The windows are tripartite sash windows, the original central doorway is blocked, and entrance is by the rear extension.	II
The Court House; 52.89463°N 2.47670°W	—	1822–28	Originally the coach house and stable block for Pell Wall, the building was designed by Sir John Soane, and has been divided into three houses. It is in painted brick and has hipped slate roofs. There are two storeys, and the building consists of a central three-bay block with recessed two-bay links to two-bay pavilions. In the centre is a round-arched entrance, the doorways and windows have round-arched heads, and the windows are casements.	II
Canal Bridge No. 56 (Cheswardine Road Bridge); 52.867796°N 2.44690°W		c.1830	The bridge carries Haywood Lane over the Shropshire Union Canal. It is in sandstone and consists of a single elliptical arch. The bridge voussoirs, raised keystones, a flat string course, a parapet, rounded coping, square end piers, and curved abutments.	II
Canal Bridge No. 57 (High Bridge); 52.87298°N 2.45139°W		c.1830	An accommodation bridge crossing the Shropshire Union Canal over a deep cutting. It is in sandstone and consists of a high elliptical arch. The bridge has voussoirs, raised impost blocks and keystones, a flat string course, a parapet, rounded coping, square end piers, and curved abutments.	II
Milepost; 52.87278°N 2.45128°W		c.1830	The milepost is on the towpath of the Shropshire Union Canal south of Bridge 57 (High Bridge). It is in cast iron and consists of a round-topped cylindrical post with three plates. The plates are inscribed with the distances in miles to Autherley Junction, Nantwich and Norbury Junction.	II
Summer house, Pell Wall; 52.89337°N 2.47997°W	—	c.1860 (probable)	The summer house is in wood with woven brushwood panels between posts, and it has a pyramidal tile roof and an octagonal plan. There is one storey, a continuous verandah and continuous bench seating. It contains Gothic windows on the east and west sides and a circular window to the south.	II
Pell Wall Stables; 52.89182°N 2.48069°W	—	1902	A stable block and coach house, the building is in orange brick with grey sandstone dressings and some applied timber, and it has hipped slate roofs. The building has a square courtyard plan. The entrance range has one storey, the side ranges have one storey and an attic, and the coach house at the rear has two storeys. At the entrance is a round archway with impost bands and a keystone, a parapeted gable, and a datestone. On the roof is an octagonal wooden cupola with round arches, a balustrade, a dentilled and moulded cornice, and a copper dome with a wrought iron weathervane. On the coach house is a square wooden dovecote.	II
