= John Holmes (British Army officer) =

British Army Officer

Major General John Holmes DSO OBE MC
- Born: 22 June 1949 (age 77)
- Military career
- Allegiance: United Kingdom
- Branch: British Army
- Service years: 1970–2002
- Rank: Major General
- Unit: Special Air Service
- Commands: 4th Division; Director Special Forces; 5th Airborne Brigade; 22 Special Air Service Regiment
- Conflicts: Sierra Leone civil war: Operation Banner; Operation Barras
- Awards: Distinguished Service Order; Officer of the Order of the British Empire; Military Cross

Major General John Taylor Holmes, DSO, OBE, MC (born 22 July 1949) is a retired British Army officer who served as Director Special Forces from 1999 to 2001, which included command of Operation Barras in September 2000.

== Military career ==
Holmes was commissioned into the Scots Guards in 1970. In 1972 he was awarded the Military Cross for service in Northern Ireland. He transferred to 22 Special Air Service in 1974 and was commanding officer of the regiment from 1989 to 1992. He then commanded the Airborne Brigade for three years. He worked for the Supreme Allied Commander Europe before being appointed Director Special Forces in 1999. He was promoted to major general in 2001 and became General Officer Commanding 4th Division, before retiring in 2002.

== Post-military career ==
In 2002, Holmes joined Inkerman, a security and risk management company. He is a Director of Erinys International, and the founder of Titon International. Holmes joined the British Syrian Society in January 2018. The BSS was set up, and is run, by Fawaz Akhras, the British-based father-in-law of President Bashar al-Assad. "It doesn’t mean I support the actions of President Assad and the Syrian government", Holmes told The Sunday Times. "I believe in dialogue ... Perhaps it [the BSS] is not the ideal vehicle for that, but at the moment it’s the only vehicle".

Military offices
Preceded by John Sutherell	Director Special Forces; 1999–2001	Succeeded by Graeme Lamb
Preceded by Timothy Sulivan	General Officer Commanding 4th Division; 2001–2002	Succeeded by Andrew Ritchie
