= Buntingsdale Hall =

Country house in Shropshire, England

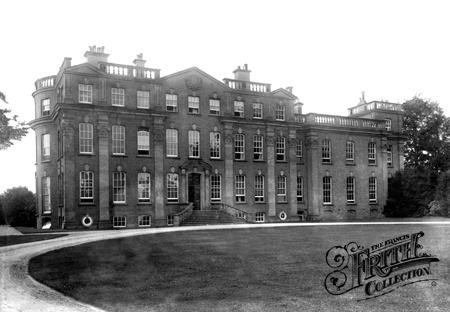

- Location within Shropshire

General information
- Location: Tayleur Drive, Sutton upon Tern, Market Drayton, Shropshire, England
- Coordinates: 52.8892°N 2.5146°W
- Completed: 1721

Design and construction
- Architects: John Prince and Francis Smith of Warwick

Buntingsdale Hall is a historic country house in the parish of Sutton upon Tern, to the southwest of Market Drayton in Shropshire, England. It became a Grade II* listed building on 14 February 1979.

== History ==
Buntingsdale Hall was first built for Bulkeley Mackworth and the Mackworth family between 1719 and 1721. The plans for the building were drawn up by the London architect and surveyor John Prince, although it was completed by Francis Smith of Warwick. Documents have revealed that Mackworth may have encountered a dispute with Prince and dismissed him and hired Francis Smith to complete the building. The estate formerly included the remains of Fordhall castle, a monument scheduled under the Ancient Monuments and Archaeological Areas Act 1979 ("Ringwork and bailey castle 390m west of Buntingsdale Hall, List entry Number 1019659")

Herbert Mackworth later sold the hall to his cousin William Tayleur, who subsequently owned the property for many years. He gives his name to Tayleur Drive, the road that leads to the hall.

Buntingsdale Hall was for many years (possibly since the group's formation in August 1943) the location of Royal Air Force HQ 22 Group. Although by 1969 there was a modern kitchen serving the original dining room in the north wing, there were few other facilities, and staff officers who "lived in" had sleeping accommodations in nearby huts. The HQ disbanded on 31 January 1972, and in a simple ceremony on that day, the RAF ensign at Buntingsdale was lowered for the last time.

In 1986, during the time that a survey was conducted of the property, it was reported that several furnishings had been stolen from the hall. By 2000 the hall was in disrepair and was placed on the Historic Buildings at Risk register. Subsequently, it was renovated and was finally removed from this register in 2004.

Over the years the hall has been owned by many different families but the current owners are Mackworths, direct descendants of Bulkeley Mackworth.

== Structure ==
The house is dated "1721" on the lead downpipe straps. It was extended and altered by Samuel Pountney Smith of Shrewsbury in 1857. It is a three-storey red brick building with red sandstone ashlar dressings, featuring some fluted pilasters and a Corinthian stone doorcase consisting of pilasters, each supporting a section of an entablature. The rainwater heads are emblazoned with the Mackworth arms and crest, and an acanthus ornament at the junction of pipes and cornice, and straps have the initials "BM" and the date "1721".

The north wing is dated to 1857, with identical east and west fronts, when the staircase was moved and the full-height entrance hall was created. The entrance hallway has black and white stone flooring and bolection-moulded panelling up to first floor level with a cornice. The first-floor gallery above with turned balusters is raised to the centre, and the central first-floor doorway is made up of fluted pilasters and an open triangular pediment. It features a stone fireplace with cable-fluted Ionic columns. The dining room features a rich cornice with vine trail and egg and dart enrichment that was added in 1857 when the fireplace was removed. The ballroom also features the same style as the dining room, with rich plaster panelling.

A garden was initially laid out with the house, covering an area of 16 hectares. The River Tern passes to the north of Buntingsdale Hall, with the main garden retaining wall west of the house, and an apsidal bow overlooking the pond. The grounds were altered several times during the 18th and 19th centuries and walled gardens, a kitchen garden (to the north), grassland (east), large fishpond and boathouse (west), and woodland (to the south) were added. By the end of the 19th century, a new entrance from the north and a lodge had been added.

== See also ==
- Grade II* listed buildings in Shropshire Council (A–G)
- Listed buildings in Sutton upon Tern
