= Ternhill =

Village in Shropshire, England

Coordinates: 52.885°N 2.542°W

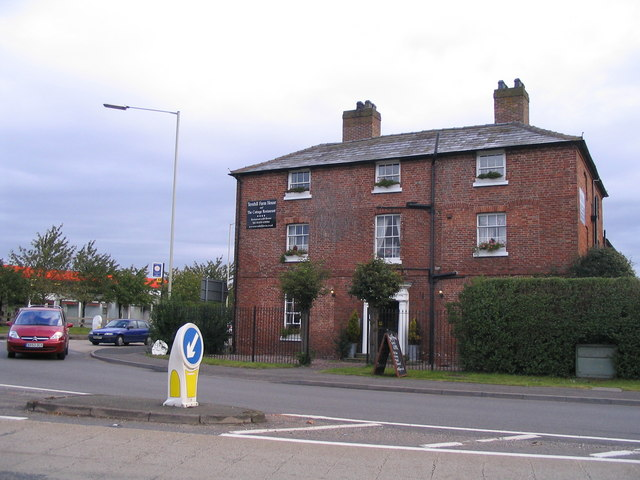
- Ternhill Farm

- Location within Shropshire
- OS grid reference: SJ635321
- Civil parish: Sutton upon Tern
- Unitary authority: Shropshire
- Ceremonial county: Shropshire
- Region: West Midlands
- Country: England
- Sovereign state: United Kingdom
- Post town: MARKET DRAYTON
- Postcode district: TF9
- Dialling code: 01630
- Police: West Mercia
- Fire: Shropshire
- Ambulance: West Midlands
- UK Parliament: North Shropshire

Tern Hill, also known as Ternhill, is a village in Shropshire, England, notable as the location of the former RAF Tern Hill station, which is now operated by the British Army as Clive Barracks. The settlement is named after the River Tern which begins just south of the settlement. The population for the village as taken in the 2011 census can be found under Moreton Say.

== History ==
In the 1620s and 1630s, the politician Sir Andrew Corbet owned land in Ternhill. In 1631, he leased a Ternhill property on the terms that the lessee provide a man to serve in war, reflecting the political tensions that eventually led to the English Civil War.

== Transport ==
=== Road ===
The A41 and A53 cross over at the village and there is now a roundabout. It has direct links with major towns and cities such as Shrewsbury, Wolverhampton, Stoke-on-Trent and Chester.

=== Bus Service ===
Tern Hill is served by the 64 bus, operated by Arriva Midlands North, which runs between Shrewsbury and Market Drayton via Shawbury.

Bus services in Astley, Shropshire
Bus operator	Route	Destination(s)	Notes
Arriva Midlands North	64	Shrewsbury → Shawbury → Hodnet → Tern Hill → Market Drayton	Some services continue to Hanley via Newcastle-under-Lyme.

Shropshire's second commercial vineyard in modern times is nearby.
