= Colin Weir =

British military officer

Major General Colin Weir CB DSO MBE
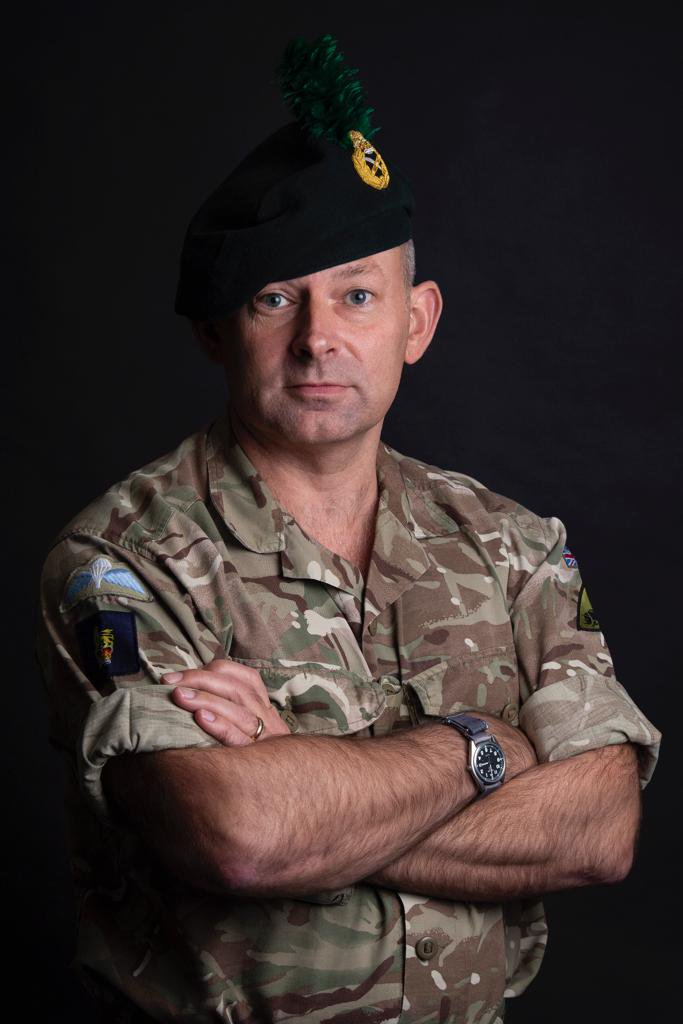
- Major General Colin Weir
- Born: 2 March 1971 (age 55); Portadown, Northern Ireland
- Military career
- Allegiance: United Kingdom
- Branch: British Army
- Service years: 1991–2024
- Rank: Major General
- Unit: Royal Irish Regiment
- Commands: 1st (United Kingdom) Division; 16 Air Assault Brigade; 1st Battalion, Royal Irish Regiment
- Conflicts: Iraq War; War in Afghanistan
- Awards: Companion of the Order of the Bath; Distinguished Service Order; Member of the Order of the British Empire

Major General Colin Richard James Weir, CB, DSO, MBE (born 2 March 1971) is a retired senior British Army officer.

== Early life and education ==
Weir was born on 2 March 1971 in Portadown, Northern Ireland. He was educated at Portadown College, and graduated from Queen's University Belfast with a Bachelor of Arts degree in History.

== Military career ==
Weir was commissioned into the Royal Irish Rangers on 26 May 1991. He was appointed commanding officer of the 1st Battalion of the Royal Irish Regiment in March 2010 and was deployed in that role to Afghanistan. He went on to be chief of staff for 1st (United Kingdom) Division in December 2012, commander of 16 Air Assault Brigade in July 2015, and Assistant Chief of Staff (Operations) at Permanent Joint Headquarters in May 2017 before becoming General Officer Commanding 1st (United Kingdom) Division in November 2018. Weir was appointed chief of staff to the Field Army in 2020, and stepped down in July 2023.

Weir was appointed Member of the Order of the British Empire (MBE) in the 2010 New Year Honours, awarded the Distinguished Service Order (DSO) on 30 September 2011 for service in Afghanistan, and appointed Companion of the Order of the Bath (CB) in the 2023 Birthday Honours.

Military offices
Preceded by Ralph Wooddisse	General Officer Commanding 1st (United Kingdom) Division; 2018–2020	Succeeded by Charles Collins
