= Clive Barracks =

British Army installation in Shropshire, England

- Ternhill
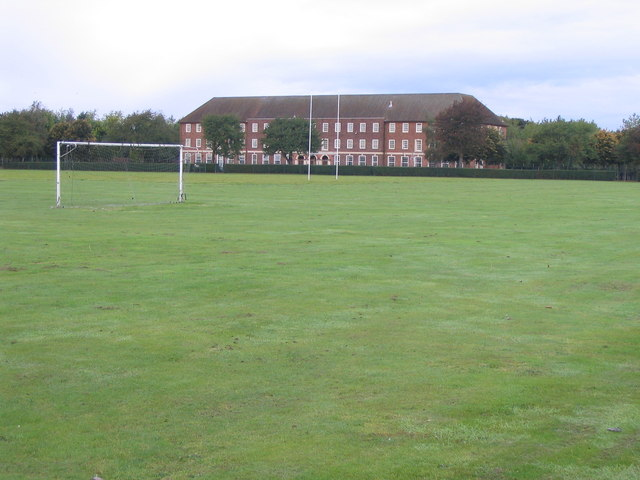
- Clive Barracks

Site information
- Type: Barracks
- Owner: Ministry of Defence
- Operator: British Army

Location
- Location within Shropshire
- Coordinates: 52°52′16″N 02°32′01″W

Site history
- Built: 1976
- In use: 1976–present

Garrison information
- Occupants: 1 Royal Irish Regiment

Clive Barracks is a British Army installation at Ternhill, Shropshire, England.

== History ==
The barracks were established on the site of the former RAF Tern Hill airfield in 1976; they were initially named Borneo Barracks, before being renamed Clive Barracks after Major-General Lord Clive, who had been born in Shropshire. Some of the early units to use the site were the Queen's Lancashire Regiment, who moved there in 1980, and the Royal Welch Fusiliers, who moved there in 1984.

=== IRA bombing ===
On 20 February 1989, two IRA bombers activated two bombs within the accommodation barracks at Tern Hill. At that time the 2nd Battalion, Parachute Regiment (who had arrived in 1987) and the 1st Battalion, The Duke of Wellington's Regiment (who had arrived in 1989) were located at the station. A sentry spotted two men behaving suspiciously and raised the alarm, the barracks were evacuated shortly before the bombs exploded therefore preventing certain loss of life. One of the accommodation blocks was destroyed in the blast (which was reported to have been heard 20 mi (32 km) away in Shrewsbury). The bombers escaped by hijacking a car from a house down the road from the barracks.

== Current units ==
Since 2007, the barracks has been home to the 1st Battalion Royal Irish Regiment, which operates in the light infantry role primarily equipped with the Foxhound armoured vehicle. As of 1 November 2018, there were 628 troops assigned to the battalion.

== Future ==
In late March 2016, the Ministry of Defence announced that the site to be sold in order to reduce the size of the Defence estate. The airfield will be retained as a Relief Landing Ground (RLG) and practice area for No 1 Flying Training School based out of nearby RAF Shawbury. Later, in November 2016, it was announced that the site would close in 2022. This was later extended to 2030.
