= Operation Toral =

British presence within Afghanistan post 2014 as part of NATO's Resolute Support Mission

- Part of the Resolute Support Mission in the War in Afghanistan (2001–2021)
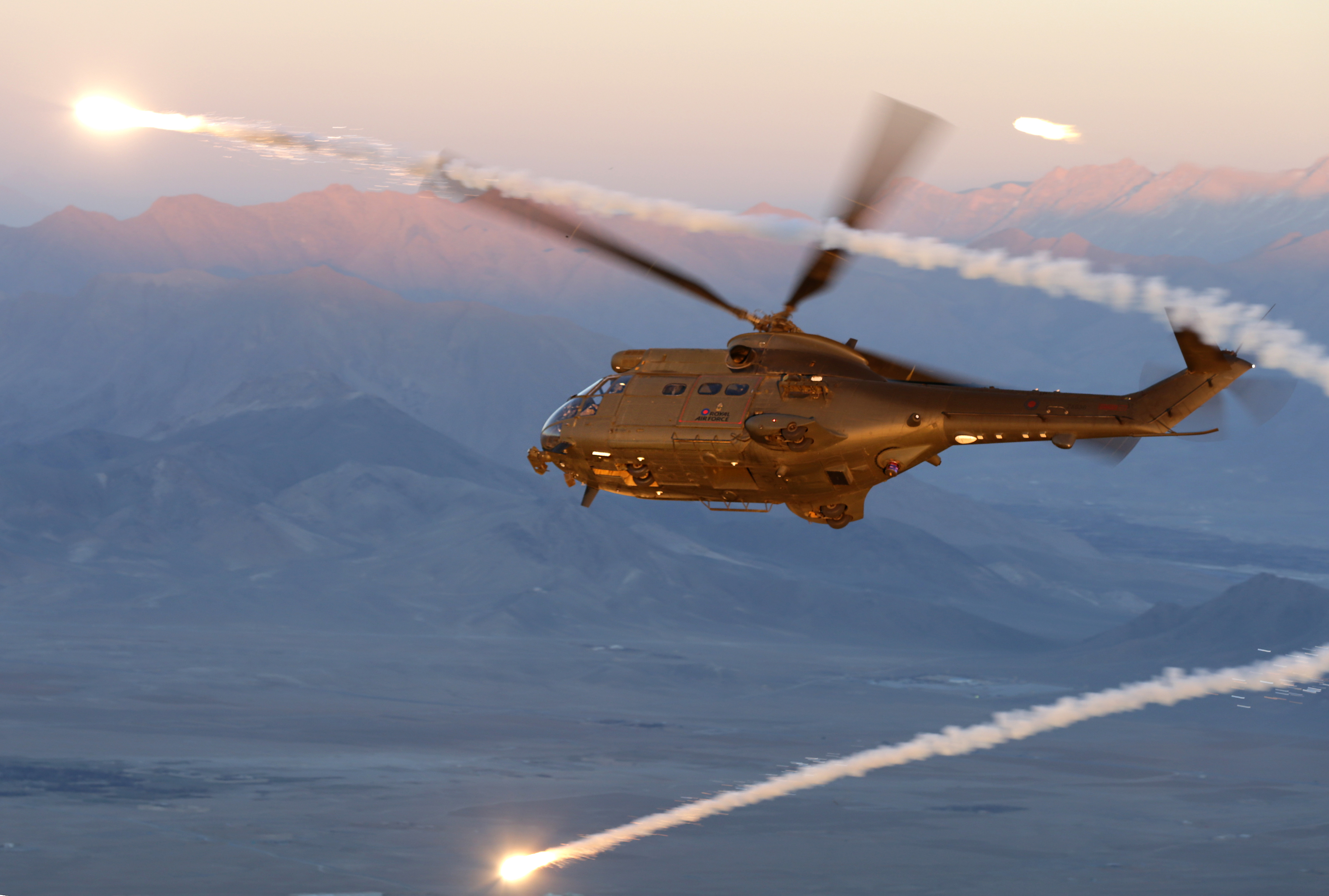
- RAF Puma helicopter of 33 Squadron deploying flares whilst on Operation Toral in Afghanistan, 14 December 2015.
Date	1 January 2015 – 8 July 2021
Location	Afghanistan
Result	Taliban victory: British operational failure; Fall of the Islamic Republic of Afghanistan

Belligerents
United Kingdom	Taliban

Casualties and losses
3 dead (non-combat)	Unknown

Operation Toral was the codename for the British presence within Afghanistan post-2014 as part of NATO's Resolute Support Mission. UK forces had two major tasks: training and mentoring Afghan Forces, and providing force protection for NATO advisors via the Kabul Security Force/Kabul Protection Unit.

The operation drew to a close on 8 July 2021 with the withdrawal of U.S. and NATO forces from the country. However, British troops were subsequently redeployed under Operation Pitting in August 2021 to evacuate British nationals and staff following the 2021 Taliban offensive.

== Background ==
Operation Herrick was the codename under which all British operations in the War in Afghanistan were conducted from 2002 to the end of combat operations in 2014. It consisted of the British contribution to the NATO-led International Security Assistance Force (ISAF), and support to the American-led Operation Enduring Freedom (OEF).

In December 2012 Prime Minister David Cameron announced that 3,800 troops—almost half of the force serving in Helmand Province—would be withdrawn during 2013 with numbers to fall to approximately 5,200. The UK ceased all combat operations in Afghanistan and withdrew the last of its combat troops on 27 October 2014. Between 2001 and 24 July 2015 a total of 454 British military personnel have died on operations in Afghanistan.

== History ==
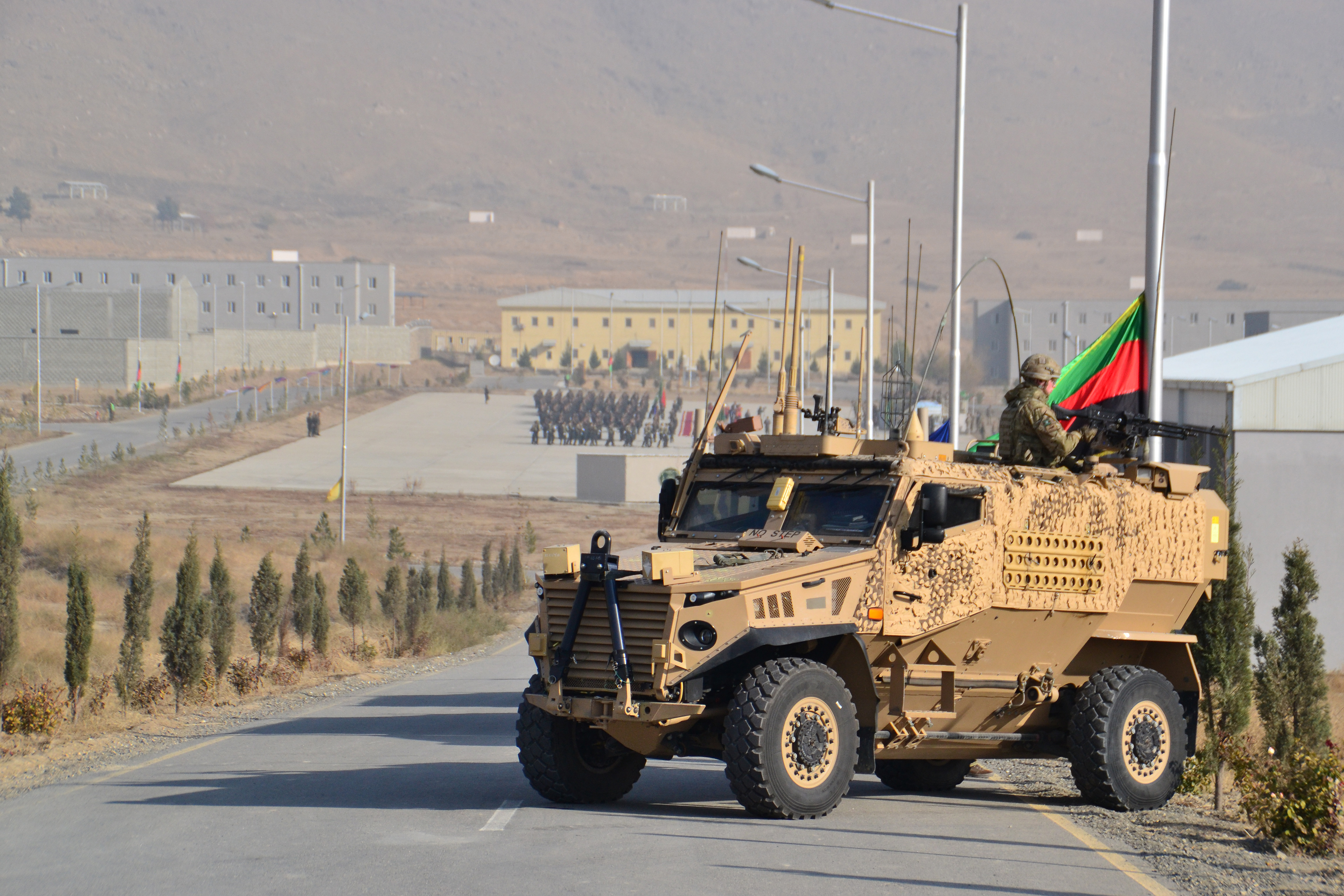
Soldiers from 2nd Battalion, the Yorkshire Regiment in a Foxhound, providing over watch security for the Afghan National Army Officer Academy (ANAOA) 10-year graduation ceremony. 23 November 2017.

Air Force Times reported that On 11 October 2015, An RAF Puma MK2 helicopter, carrying 9 crew and passengers, crashed as it was landing at NATO's Resolute Support Mission HQ in Kabul, after colliding with a .58 inch tether line of a Persistent Threat Detection System intelligence, surveillance and reconnaissance blimp on the southwest edge of the compound. Forces.net reported that 5 were killed (Flight lieutenant Alan Scott of 33 Squadron, and Flight lieutenant Geraint Roberts of 230 Squadron RAF and 3 US Servicemen) and 5 more were injured.

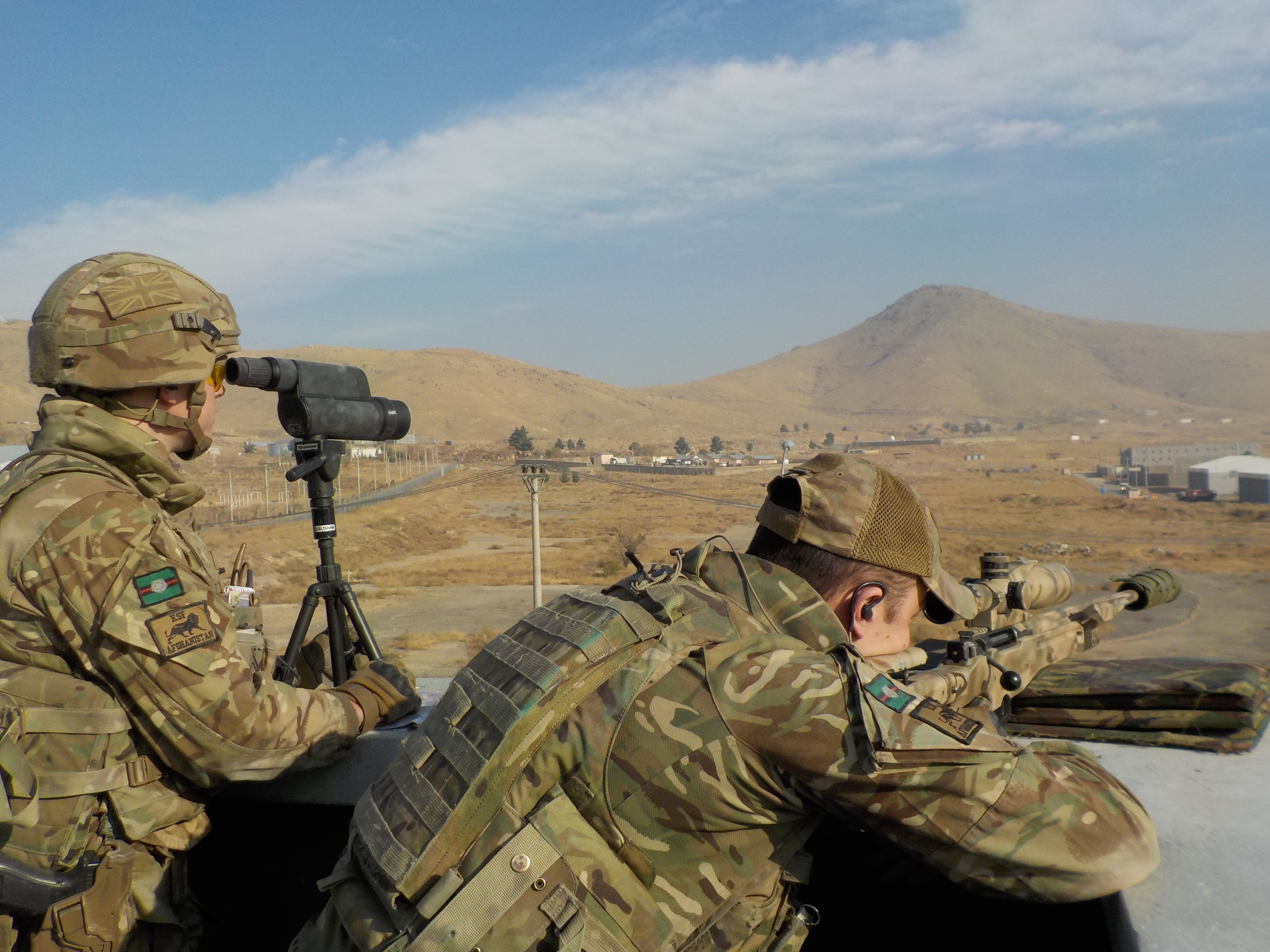
A sniper team from 2nd Battalion The Yorkshire Regiment providing overwatch security for the Afghan National Army Officer Academy (ANAOA) 10 year graduation ceremony, which was held at their Kabul facility. 23 November 2017.

The BBC reported that on 11 October 2015, a convoy of British military vehicles in Kabul was hit by a Taliban IED, at least 2 civilians (a woman and a child) were injured, there were no British casualties. The Taliban claimed the attack was in retaliation for airstrikes in Kunduz that had killed civilians and doctors (marking the first time British troops had been targeted in Kabul since British combat forces withdrew from Afghanistan in 2014), officials in Kabul said it was a suicide bombing.

Forces.net reported that during the Taliban attack on the Inter-Continental Hotel in Kabul on 20 January 2018, members of 2nd Battalion the Yorkshire Regiment, assisted by members of the Australian Army and the Oklahoma National Guard, evacuated 43 international civilians from the hotel.

In July 2018, the Independent reported that following a request for reinforcements by President Donald Trump, the British government would deploy an additional 440 British troops to Afghanistan in a non-combat role of training and assisting Afghan forces, bringing total up to 1,100; the deployment began in August.

The BBC reported that a paratrooper from 2nd Battalion, The Parachute Regiment died in Kabul on 22 February 2020 due to a "non-battle injury".

On 15 April 2021, Sky News reported that British troops in Afghanistan would begin their withdrawal in the following month, alongside other NATO allies.

Operation Toral ended on 8 July 2021, however a small number of personnel remained in the country for diplomatic support. Alongside NATO partners, the UK had trained 5,000 Afghan cadets, including 330 women, at the Afghan National Army Officer Academy (ANAOA). The withdrawal was carried out logistically across the armed forces, with the RAF alone making 50 flights, some of which involved the transportation of Puma helicopters. The Puma helicopters had airlifted 126,000 passengers and moved 660,000 kg of freight during their deployment.

In August 2021, following the withdrawal of U.S. and NATO forces from Afghanistan and an ensuing Taliban offensive, the UK redeployed troops to the country to facilitate the evacuation of British nationals and staff under Operation Pitting.

== Roulements ==
The below list doesn't include support elements or individual augmenters from the three Services, such as personnel who have been assigned to specific Staff Officer roles in HQ Resolute Support Mission.

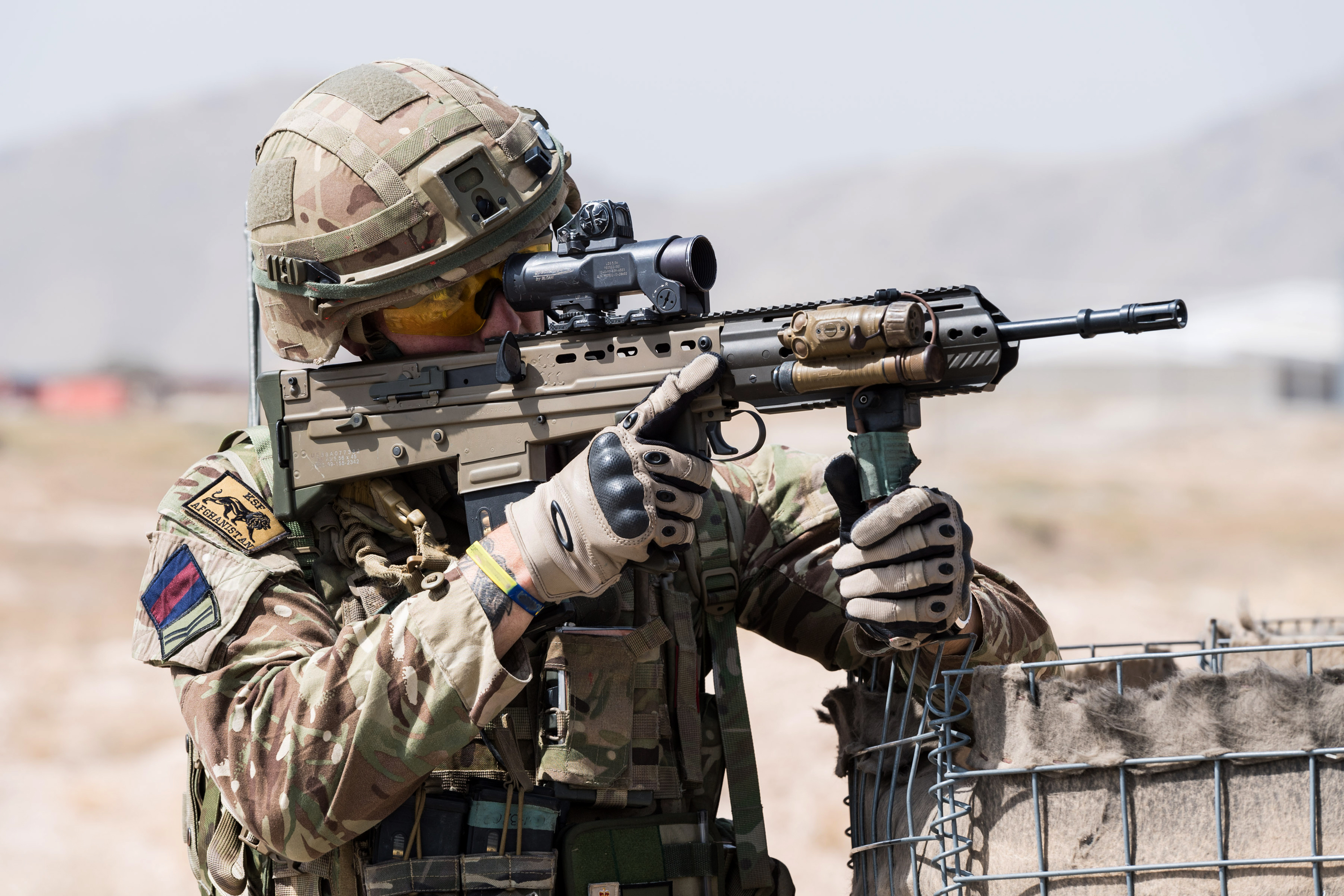
Soldier from the Household Cavalry aiming his rifle whilst deployed on Operation Toral, 24 September 2018.

British Army

- OP TORAL I; 16 February 2015 – 18 August 2015; 1st Battalion, Royal Anglian Regiment (1 R ANGLIAN)
- OP TORAL II; 18 August 2015 – 17 April 2016; Royal Highland Fusiliers, 2nd Battalion the Royal Regiment of Scotland (2 SCOTS)
- OP TORAL III; 17 April 2016 – 10 December 2016; 2nd Battalion, Royal Gurkha Rifles (2 RGR)
- OP TORAL IV; 10 December 2016 – 12 August 2017; 1st Battalion, Royal Irish Regiment (1 R IRISH)
- OP TORAL V; 12 August 2017 – 11 April 2018; 2nd Battalion, The Yorkshire Regiment (2 YORKS)
- OP TORAL VI; 11 April 2018 – 14 November 2018; 1st Battalion, Welsh Guards (1 WG)
- OP TORAL VII; 14 November 2018 – 23 March 2019; 1st Battalion, Royal Anglian Regiment (1 R ANGLIAN) and 1st Battalion, Royal Gurkha Rifles (1 RGR)
- OP TORAL VIII; 29 March 2019 – 8 November 2019; 1st Battalion, Royal Irish Regiment (1 R IRISH) 1st Battalion, The Rifles (1 RIFLES)
- OP TORAL IX; 8 November 2019 – 9 May 2020; 2nd Battalion, The Parachute Regiment (2 PARA) and 2nd Battalion, The Yorkshire Regiment (2 YORKS)
- OP TORAL X; 9 May 2020 – 31 October 2020; The Highlanders, 4th Battalion the Royal Regiment of Scotland (4 SCOTS) and 2nd Battalion, The Rifles (2 RIFLES)
- OP TORAL XI; 31 October 2020–after February 2021; Royal Highland Fusiliers, 2nd Battalion the Royal Regiment of Scotland (2 SCOTS) and 1st Battalion, Royal Anglian Regiment (1 R ANGLIAN)
- OP TORAL XII; after February 2021–8 July 2021; The Black Watch, 3rd Battalion the Royal Regiment of Scotland (3 SCOTS)

Royal Air Force

- January 2015–March 2015; 3 × Boeing Chinook HC2 of No. 1310 Flight RAF with 51 personnel.
- April 2015–June 2021; 3 × Westland Puma HC2.
