= Personal Track Safety =

Safety protocols for UK railway workers

Personal Track Safety (PTS) is a system of safer working practices employed within the United Kingdom designed to ensure the safety of railway workers who have to work on or near the line.

The principal hazards include collisions between a rail vehicle and a track worker, electrocution from traction power sources (third rail, fourth rail, OHLE) and trips and falls. The last could compound the other two (e.g. a worker could fall onto an electrified third rail). PTS ensures that rail workers are aware of their surroundings so that they do not enter situations where the aforementioned accidents are likely to occur, are able to move around the lineside safely and are able to react appropriately to circumstances (e.g. the approach of a train).

Compared to road vehicles, trains have a much greater stopping distance at the same speed, but often travel much faster than road vehicles. Unlike road vehicles, they cannot swerve out of the way of obstructions. Trains cannot be relied upon to stop for rail workers. Hence it is the duty of the track worker to remain in or retire to a safe location on the approach of a train. It is important that a lookout is kept (often working as a team). In order that trains can indicate their presence to workers, orange high visibility clothing must be worn. Clothing that is yellow, green or red is disallowed because those colours are the colours of signal flags.

== Sentinel Card ==
A Sentinel Card is required before anybody is allowed to work within the boundary of Network Rail tracks in the UK (on or near the line). It is also a requirement in the Republic of Ireland. Any potential employee must undergo a medical and a drug and alcohol test before attending a "personal track safety" course.

The Sentinel Card is a smartcard which links to an online database, giving details of the holder's competencies and other details – this may include:

- Medical certificate (expiry dependent on age)
- PTS (AC or DCCR) (expiry 2–5 years)
- PICOP, COSS, IWA or others.

Deregulation in the national railway service in the UK has meant that increasing numbers of subcontractors are being employed within the track environment. Contractors are often used for specific limited projects and are often from companies that have not previously been considered as having "railway pedigrees or culture".

To work on or near the track involves certification for the individual employee of which there are several levels of competence and responsibility which are assessed.

The basic level for track access for Network Rail is the Personal Track Safety certificate (PTS) as defined by the railway safety standards NR/L2/CTM/021. These levels of certification only assess the individual’s ability to work safely in the track environment. This means that the individual is able to respond and correctly react to circumstances which may arise in this potentially dangerous environment. Persons therefore should not have any condition or be taking any medication that may lead to sudden incapacity, loss of consciousness, dizziness, impairment of awareness, concentration, balance, coordination, or any significant limitation of mobility or impairment of hearing and vision. Persons with minor medical conditions (e.g. colour blind) may still be issued a PTS – though the card will have an indicator, a blue circle, to inform the controller of site safety (COSS) to that person's ailment. Similarly, those who have only recently got their PTS certificate will have a green square on their online record to indicate their 'new' status, as well as a blue hard hat instead of the usual white hard hat.

The medical assessment undertaken for PTS certification does not address the medical specificity for tasks that an individual may be expected to undertake in their normal duties when actually working on the track. i.e. operating machinery or responsibility for other staff requires a higher level of assessment for the job specification and procedures.

The medical assessment for these certificates must be undertaken by an accredited medical provider. In the case of PTS this is authorised by RISQS under the authority of Network Rail.

Providers of this service are registered appropriately and regular audit is undertaken to ensure that they meet the quality control levels for the specific standards of performance and training needed to reliably undertake the medical assessments.

Since 2006 the standards for a PTS have been regulated by the Office of Rail and Road

== Basic medical assessment ==
Basic medical assessment for national rail PTS involves the following medical modalities and components.

1. A medical questionnaire. This is a general medical questionnaire to focus on any aspects of an individual’s medical history that may have any specific bearing on their ability to operate safely in the track environment. In particular questions that relate to the possibility of medication or medical conditions that may be responsible for sudden impairment, a lack of concentration or awareness or compromised mobility.
2. Audiometry (hearing test). This must be undertaken using equipment that conforms to the appropriate standards and guidelines specified with regular recorded calibration and maintenance. The subject should meet specific standards.
3. Vision testing. This is undertaken under controlled conditions to meet specified visual standards.
4. A clinical examination includes the following:

a) Blood pressure estimation
b) Physical examination, where appropriate,
c) Urine testing, screening for some specific medical disorders.

Where an individual fails to meet the specific medical standards it is, sometimes possible with the written agreement and co-operation of management and occupational health to implement a system of formal "safe working practices". This is so as not to discriminate unnecessarily against individuals with certain medical problems.

The object of the medical assessment is to ensure that employers meet their duty of care so that individuals working in this potentially dangerous environment are not subject to increased risk of harm to themselves or their colleagues, or in some cases members of the public, due to any foreseeable underlying medical condition..

The work environment is in continual flux, and changes in acceptable risk are therefore variable. For this reason a provider of these services must be up to date with the policies and procedures within the industry and flexible to meet the changing demands required with transparency.

== Preserved railways ==
Preserved railways often have their own volunteer PTS courses. Network Rail will not accept these PTS cards, and often vice versa.
