= Green Zone (disambiguation) =

Green Zone may refer to:

- Green Zone, Baghdad, Iraq; a fortified high-security district in central Baghdad
  - Various other areas with heightened security, in reference to the famous Baghdad area
- Green Zone (film), a 2010 war film by director Paul Greengrass starring Matt Damon about Baghdad in the U.S.-Iraq War
- The Green Zone: The Environmental Costs of US Militarism, a 2009 book by Barry Sanders (professor)
- Green Zone, a sports radio show originally called The Drew Remenda Sports Show with Drew Remenda
- Green Zone, a change in coloration on third and fourth downs on NBC Sunday Night Football starting in 2018
- Green Zone, a site security methodology employed by Network Rail's controller of site safety

== See also ==
- Safe zone
- Midori-ku
- Green (disambiguation)
- Zone (disambiguation)
