= 2nd Battalion, Parachute Regiment =

2nd Battalion, the Parachute Regiment
- Cap badge of the Parachute Regiment
- Active: 1941—1947; 1948—present
- Country: United Kingdom
- Branch: British Army
- Type: Airborne Forces
- Role: Air Assault; Light Infantry
- Size: Battalion
- Part of: Parachute Regiment; 16 Air Assault Brigade
- Garrison/HQ: Colchester Garrison
- Nickname: Immaculate Second
- Mottos: Utrinque Paratus (Latin for "Ready for Anything")
- Engagements: World War II; Bruneval Raid; Tunisian Campaign; Invasion of Sicily; Invasion of Italy; Battle of Arnhem; Suez Crisis; Operation Sheepskin; Falklands War; Battle of Goose Green; Battle of Wireless Ridge; The Troubles; Warrenpoint Ambush; Iraq War; Afghanistan War; Operation Herrick VIII; Operation Herrick XIII

Commanders
- Commanding Officer: Lt Col Christopher Hitchins
- Notable commanders: Maj Gen John Frost DSO*, MC; Lt. Col Herbert 'H' Jones VC

Insignia
- Drop zone flash

The Second Battalion, Parachute Regiment (2 PARA), is a battalion of the Parachute Regiment within the British Army and forms part of 16th Air Assault Brigade.

An airborne light infantry battalion, 2 PARA is trained and equipped to deploy at short notice across a broad spectrum of operations. Its roles include air assault and parachute insertion, rapid reaction tasks, and expeditionary warfare in diverse environments. The battalion is capable of conducting high-readiness missions ranging from conventional combat operations to peace support, humanitarian assistance, and security tasks, often operating as part of the British Army’s global response forces. It is based at Merville Barracks in Colchester Garrison, England.

== History ==
The 2nd Battalion, Parachute Regiment was formed on 30 September 1941 at Hardwick Hall, Derbyshire, as the 2nd Parachute Battalion, from volunteers drawn from units across the British Army (retaining a notably strong Scottish character throughout the war). Its first commanding officer was Lieutenant Colonel E. W. C. Flavell. The battalion initially formed part of the Army Air Corps.

=== Second World War ===
Its first active operation was the night of 27-28 February 1942, when C Company, commanded by Major John Frost, spearheaded Operation Biting (the Bruneval Raid) against a German Würzburg radar station near Le Havre, France. The company captured vital radar components and a German technician; the force was successfully evacuated by Royal Navy landing craft. The raid yielded critical technical intelligence and was a major propaganda success. In honour of the achievement, C Company received the permanent nickname "C (Bruneval) Company", and Bruneval became the first battle honour of the Parachute Regiment. On 1 August 1942 the battalion was redesignated the 2nd Battalion, the Parachute Regiment.

Assigned to the 1st Parachute Brigade of the 1st Airborne Division, the battalion next saw action in North Africa. On 29 November 1942 it dropped by daylight at Depienne airfield, Tunisia, with the objective of seizing Oudna airfield nine miles from Tunis and linking with the advancing First Army. Isolated 56 miles behind enemy lines and facing strong German armour, artillery, Stuka dive-bombers and fighters, the battalion, now commanded by Lieutenant Colonel John Frost after Lieutenant Colonel G. P. Gofton-Salmond fell ill, conducted a fighting withdrawal to Medjez el Bab. The action cost 16 officers and 250 other ranks; Oudna was nevertheless awarded as a battle honour. The survivors then fought as conventional infantry through the Tunisian campaign until April 1943.

In July 1943 the battalion participated in Operation Fustian (Sicily), dropping with the brigade in an attempt to seize the Primosole Bridge over the Simeto River. This was followed in September 1943 by Operation Slapstick, a seaborne landing at Taranto on the Italian mainland.

The battalion's most celebrated action was during the Battle of Arnhem in September 1944 as part of Operation Market Garden. Dropped on 17 September under Lieutenant Colonel John Frost, the 2nd Battalion, accompanied by reconnaissance troops, airborne engineers and a handful of men from the 3rd Battalion, was the only British unit to reach the Arnhem road bridge. It captured and held the northern end against repeated attacks by elements of the 9th SS Panzer Division Hohenstaufen. Cut off and vastly outnumbered, the force defended the position for three days and four nights. Frost was wounded on 20 September; Lieutenant John Grayburn of A Company was posthumously awarded the Victoria Cross. By dusk on 20 September the survivors were ordered to break out or surrender; only about 16 men initially reached Allied lines (others later evaded capture and rejoined). The defence of Arnhem Bridge remains one of the most famous feats of British airborne troops in the Second World War.

=== Post-war reorganisation ===
After the war the battalion was reformed and served with the 6th Airborne Division in Palestine from late 1945. Sent initially as the Imperial Strategic Reserve, the division (and 2 Para as part of the 2nd Parachute Brigade, based in the Gaza area) rapidly assumed internal security duties amid escalating violence between Jewish and Arab communities and attacks by Zionist insurgent groups such as Irgun and Lehi. The battalion conducted cordon and search operations, road blocks, convoy protection and guarding of key installations throughout the Mandate period. The 6th Airborne Division as a whole suffered 58 killed and 236 wounded during its time in Palestine. On 13 December 1947 the battalion was amalgamated with the 3rd Parachute Battalion to form the 2nd/3rd Parachute Battalion, which was disbanded shortly afterwards. A new 2nd Battalion was created later the same year by redesignating the 5th (Scottish) Parachute Battalion.

=== Suez Crisis and Middle East ===
In the early postwar years the battalion conducted internal security duties with the 16th Parachute Brigade. It deployed to the Canal Zone in Egypt from 1951 to 1954 to safeguard the Suez Canal amid regional unrest, undertaking guard duties, mobile patrols and training drops into neighbouring Jordan. In July 1956 it moved to Cyprus to conduct anti-terrorist operations against the EOKA insurgency in the Kyrenia Mountains and around Nicosia. Later that year it took part in Operation Musketeer during the Suez Crisis as part of 16 Independent Parachute Brigade Group, conducting sea-borne landings at Port Said and occupying El Cap. In July 1958 the battalion flew into Amman, Jordan, as part of the brigade intervention force to stabilise the kingdom.

=== 1960s deployments ===
In June 1961, as part of Operation Vantage, 2 Para formed part of an 8,000-strong battle group deployed to the newly independent state of Kuwait to deter a threatened invasion by Iraq. The battalion occupied the Matla Ridge astride the main Iraqi tank route to Kuwait City. Further deployments to Bahrain followed in 1963 and 1966, while in 1964 D Company Group was held in Aden in anticipation of a possible move to Zanzibar (later cancelled). In early 1965 the battalion was rushed to Singapore for intensive jungle training before moving to Borneo during the Indonesian Confrontation. C Company operated as a special patrols company on SAS lines, while on 27 April 1965 approximately 35 men of B Company (lightly held due to a patrol changeover) repulsed a ferocious night assault by a full Indonesian Javanese battalion at the fortified base of Plaman Mapu in Sarawak. After nearly two hours of close-quarter fighting the Indonesians were beaten off with around 50 casualties; the British suffered two killed (Private Henry Smith and Lance Corporal Ian McKellar, who died later in hospital) and eight wounded. Gallantry awards included a Distinguished Conduct Medal and several Military Medals and Mentions in Despatches. The action was the largest single battle of the confrontation and marked a turning point that deterred further large-scale Indonesian incursions.

In 1968 the battalion completed a six-month tour in Hong Kong after further jungle training in Malaya to counter illegal immigration from the People's Republic of China. In March 1969 it conducted Operation Sheepskin on the Caribbean island of Anguilla to restore British administration amid political unrest over federation proposals. 2 Para, together with members of the London Scottish, landed by boat from three Royal Navy frigates alongside 120 Metropolitan Police officers. The intervention was bloodless and widely regarded as a successful hearts-and-minds operation; the battalion was later awarded the Wilkinson Sword of Peace for acts of humanity and kindness overseas.

=== Northern Ireland ===
During the 1970s the battalion began operations in Northern Ireland as part of Operation Banner. It completed 16 tours between 1970 and 2002, spending a total of 114 months in the province, longer than any other parachute battalion. The first tour began in February 1970 in the Shankill Road district of Belfast. Subsequent residential tours included Ballykinler (1979-1981) and multiple shorter emergency deployments. The battalion also served two-year postings in Berlin (1977-1979) and conducted deterrent tours in Belize in 1983 and 1987-1988 to forestall Guatemalan threats.

Its greatest single loss came on 27 August 1979 during a 20-month tour when a double Provisional IRA ambush at Narrow Water Castle near Warrenpoint killed 18 British soldiers (16 of them from 2 Para, including a company commander). The first 700-pound bomb, hidden in a parked trailer, destroyed part of a convoy; a second device detonated as rescuers arrived. This was the deadliest single attack on the British Army during the Troubles.

=== Falklands War ===
In 1982, during the Falklands War (Operation Corporate), 2 Para served with 3 Commando Brigade. The battalion embarked aboard the civilian North Sea car ferry MV Norland on 26 April 1982. After LCU landing-craft training at Ascension Island, it became the first major unit from the main assault force to land on East Falkland. Disembarking by landing craft at San Carlos Water (codename Blue Beach) on 21 May, it secured the southern part of the brigade bridgehead on Sussex Mountain by 22 May.

The battalion's first major engagement was the Battle of Darwin and Goose Green (28-29 May). Ordered south on 26 May to neutralise the Argentine strategic reserve and airfield, 2 Para moved forward to Camilla Creek House on 27 May for final orders. The assault began in the early hours of 28 May (approximately 03:35) with limited naval gunfire support. Advancing across open isthmus ground, the battalion encountered entrenched Argentine positions and became pinned down at dawn. Lieutenant Colonel H. Jones led a solo charge against a machine-gun post on Darwin Hill; he was killed in the action and was posthumously awarded the Victoria Cross. Command passed to Major Chris Keeble. After fierce trench-to-trench fighting, A Company cleared Darwin Ridge by midday, B Company captured Boca Hill with MILAN anti-tank missiles, and D Company pushed on to the settlement. By last light on 28 May all positions except Goose Green itself had been taken. Negotiations overnight led to an unconditional Argentine surrender on the morning of 29 May. The battalion took approximately 961-1,250 prisoners and inflicted around 45-55 Argentine killed, at the cost of 15 men killed (including the commanding officer) and 33 paratroopers wounded. Several gallantry awards were made for the battle, including the Distinguished Service Order to Major Chris Keeble, Military Crosses to Majors John Crosland and Charles Farrar-Hockley, Distinguished Conduct Medals to Corporal David Abols and others, and numerous Military Medals.

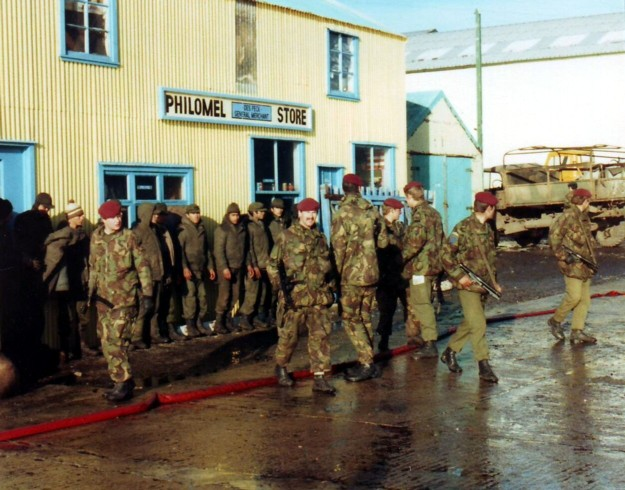
Soldiers from 2 PARA guarding Argentine POWs at Port Stanley in 1982.

After Goose Green the battalion captured Bluff Cove and Fitzroy before moving forward for its second major action. The Battle of Wireless Ridge took place on the night of 13-14 June under the new commanding officer, Lieutenant Colonel David Chaundler. Supported by 6,000 rounds of artillery, naval gunfire from HMS Ambuscade, and two troops of Scorpion/Scimitar light tanks, 2 Para attacked in phases: D Company seized the initial objective ("Rough Diamond"), followed by A and B Companies on "Apple Pie", and a final push by D Company. Argentine resistance from the 7th Infantry Regiment crumbled under the combined-arms assault. The ridge was secured by dawn on 14 June at the cost of three men killed and 11 wounded. The action opened the way for the advance into Port Stanley; 2 Para was among the first British troops to enter the capital on 14 June as the Argentine forces surrendered. The battalion subsequently guarded Argentine prisoners of war (including at sheep sheds in Fitzroy) before repatriation and performed deterrent duties on the islands.

=== Balkans, Sierra Leone and early Afghanistan ===
The battalion contributed to Operation Palliser in Sierra Leone in 2000, providing D Company Group as part of the 1 Para Battle Group. Deployed via Senegal on 7 May, the elements helped secure Lungi International Airport as a forward operating base and the Aberdeen Peninsula near Freetown, conducting patrols and supporting the non-combatant evacuation of over 500 civilians amid the civil war. The force also engaged rebel Revolutionary United Front (RUF) elements in limited contacts (including mortar-supported actions where RUF withdrew with casualties), before handing over security responsibilities to 42 Commando Royal Marines on 26 May. No casualties were suffered by the 2 Para detachment during the initial phase.

In August 2001 the battalion deployed to Macedonia as the main British contribution (approximately 1,000 personnel) to NATO's Operation Essential Harvest (UK codename Operation Bessemer). The paratroopers' role was to collect and destroy weapons voluntarily surrendered by ethnic Albanian insurgents of the National Liberation Army under the Ohrid Framework Agreement. Operating from a headquarters in a former fruit-processing plant at Dracevo near Skopje, 2 Para conducted three major collection operations between 27 August and 26 September. NATO forces overall collected more than 3,875 weapons and large quantities of ammunition, which were destroyed. The mission successfully de-escalated the conflict without significant combat and the battalion returned to the United Kingdom on 12 October 2001.

This was followed in 2002 by Operation Fingal, the initial British contribution to the International Security Assistance Force in Kabul, Afghanistan. The battalion also took part in numerous training exercises worldwide.

=== Iraq War ===
The battalion conducted two six-month tours in Iraq under Operation Telic as part of the British contribution to the stabilisation and counter-insurgency phase following the 2003 invasion. For Telic 3 in 2003 the battalion deployed by air into theatre shortly after the fall of Baghdad and operated in the south of the country, primarily in the Al Muthanna province and along the Saudi border. Its role focused on long-range patrols, sniper overwatch positions, vehicle checkpoints and support to reconstruction efforts amid growing insurgent activity. The paratroopers faced sporadic attacks from militia groups using small arms, rocket-propelled grenades and improvised explosive devices but were not involved in any large-scale conventional battles. The tour emphasised hearts-and-minds operations alongside coalition partners to secure key supply routes and deter cross-border infiltration.

Telic 7 in 2005 saw the battalion return to similar duties in the same region, conducting mounted and dismounted patrols, sniper operations to dominate the desert border areas and training local Iraqi security forces. Again the emphasis was on stabilisation rather than offensive combat; the battalion operated from forward bases in Al Muthanna, maintaining security in a vast desert province while supporting the transition to Iraqi control. No set-piece battalion-level engagements occurred, but the tours exposed 2 Para to the evolving asymmetric threats of the insurgency. The battalion returned to the United Kingdom having completed both deployments without the headline casualties or gallantry citations that marked its other post-war operations.

=== Afghanistan War ===
Further deployments to Afghanistan under Operation Herrick followed. The most intense was during Herrick VIII in spring 2008, when 2 Para formed the nucleus of a 1,150-strong all-arms Battle Group North within 16 Air Assault Brigade. After deployment training the battalion flew into Camp Bastion and established five forward operating bases (FOBs) in the Upper Sangin Valley of Helmand Province, one of the most contested Taliban strongholds. C Company, manning FOB Gibraltar, came under sustained attack: the position was assaulted or targeted 36 times over four months, with the company involved in 29 separate firefights and 22 IED incidents or bombings. Patrols into the dense Green Zone along the Helmand River drew constant Taliban ambushes using small arms, RPGs and mortars. The fighting was attritional and close-quarters; the average age of the paratroopers was 23. Over the tour 2 Para suffered five men killed in action, 14 seriously injured and 30 wounded, the highest death rate of any British unit in Afghanistan up to that point. It is estimated the battle group inflicted around 150 Taliban casualties. The intensity of contacts was compared to some of the heaviest fighting of the Second World War.

The battalion returned for Herrick 13 in late 2010, again flying into Camp Bastion after pre-deployment training. Under the command of Lieutenant Colonel Andrew Harrison MBE, 2 Para led operations into the settlement of Tor Ghai in the Nahr-e Saraj district on 12 December 2010, supported by elements of 3 Para and 5 Scots. The advance began at first light after a sandstorm cleared, with the battalion pushing into Taliban-held compounds in a deliberate clearance operation. The tour involved further patrolling and mentoring Afghan forces in a still-dangerous environment but saw a lower tempo of contacts than 2008. The battalion completed the six-month deployment as part of the ongoing drawdown and transition to Afghan-led security.

=== Recent operations ===
Following the Manchester Arena bombing in May 2017 and the activation of Operation Temperer, elements of 2 Para were deployed to London to guard key strategic locations, including the Palace of Westminster.

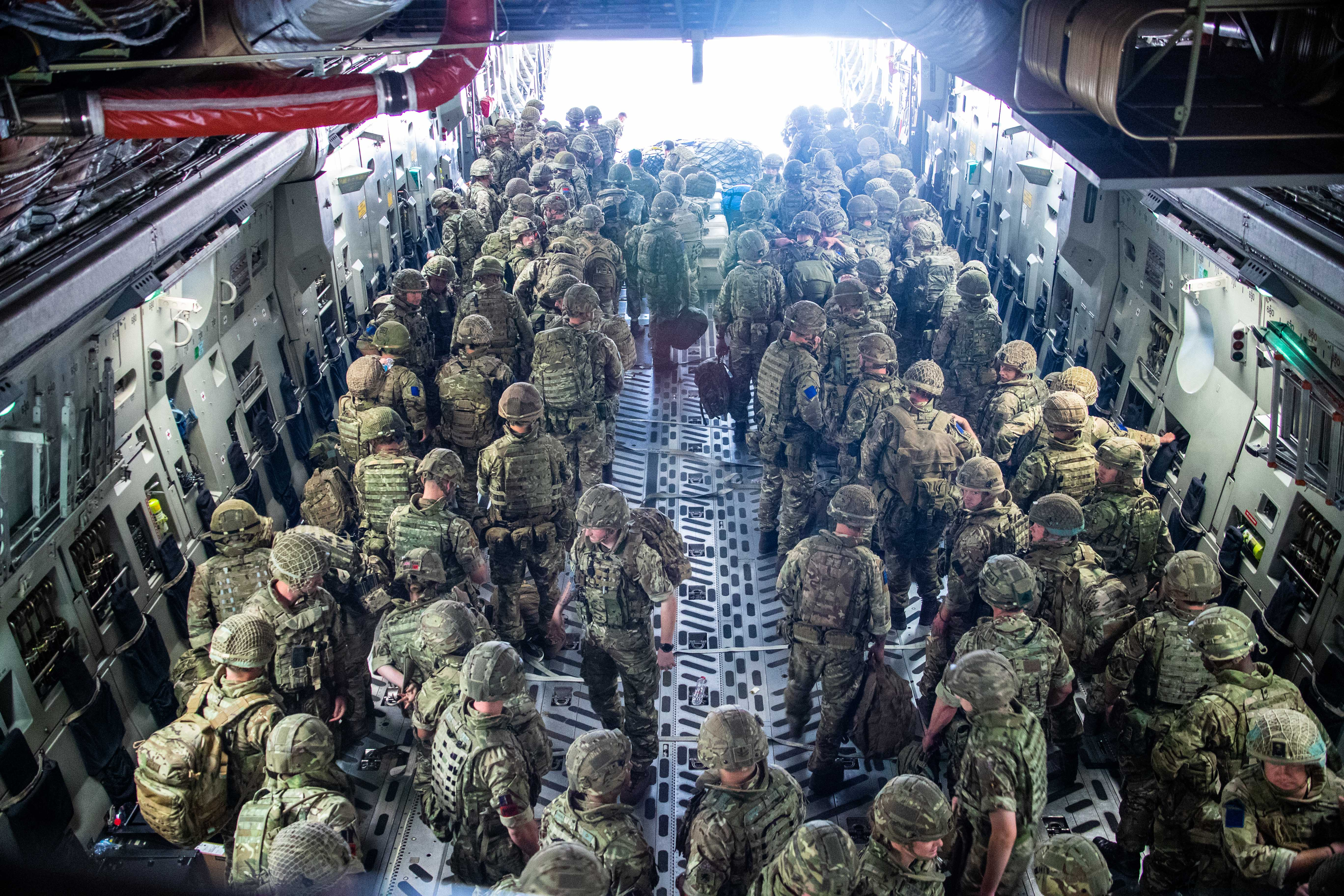
Soldiers from 2 PARA arriving in Kabul to evacuate British nationals and eligible Afghans as part of Operation Pitting.

In August 2021, as the Taliban rapidly advanced, elements of the battalion deployed to Kabul International Airport as part of 16 Air Assault Brigade's airlift protection force during Operation Pitting. Amid chaotic scenes with thousands of desperate civilians surging at the perimeter and Taliban forces nearby, 2 Para provided security, crowd control and protection for the evacuation of British nationals, embassy staff and eligible Afghans. The operation, running from 13 to 28 August, successfully evacuated over 15,000 people in what was the largest humanitarian airlift since the Berlin Airlift.

=== Phantom Platoon ===
In 2026 the battalion formed Phantom Platoon, a Cyber and Electromagnetic Activities (CEMA) platoon assigned to provide tactical electronic‑warfare and spectrum‑management support to 16 Air Assault Brigade. The platoon deployed with 2 PARA to Exercise Orion in France, a multinational airborne exercise led by 11e Brigade Parachutiste and involving about 2,000 personnel from 16 Air Assault Brigade and French units. Organised into elements for signals collection, electronic attack and spectrum management, Phantom Platoon was reported to operate "Kraken" (a software‑defined radio signal tracker), "Unagi" (a reconfigurable transmitter for jamming and deception) and "Plankton" (a Wi‑Fi extender used against unmanned systems), and to use mission software for signal analysis and geolocation. The platoon’s activities on Orion were described as trials to assess battalion‑level SIGINT reporting, coordination of electronic‑attack effects with manoeuvre, and brigade spectrum deconfliction in an electronically contested training environment.

== Structure ==
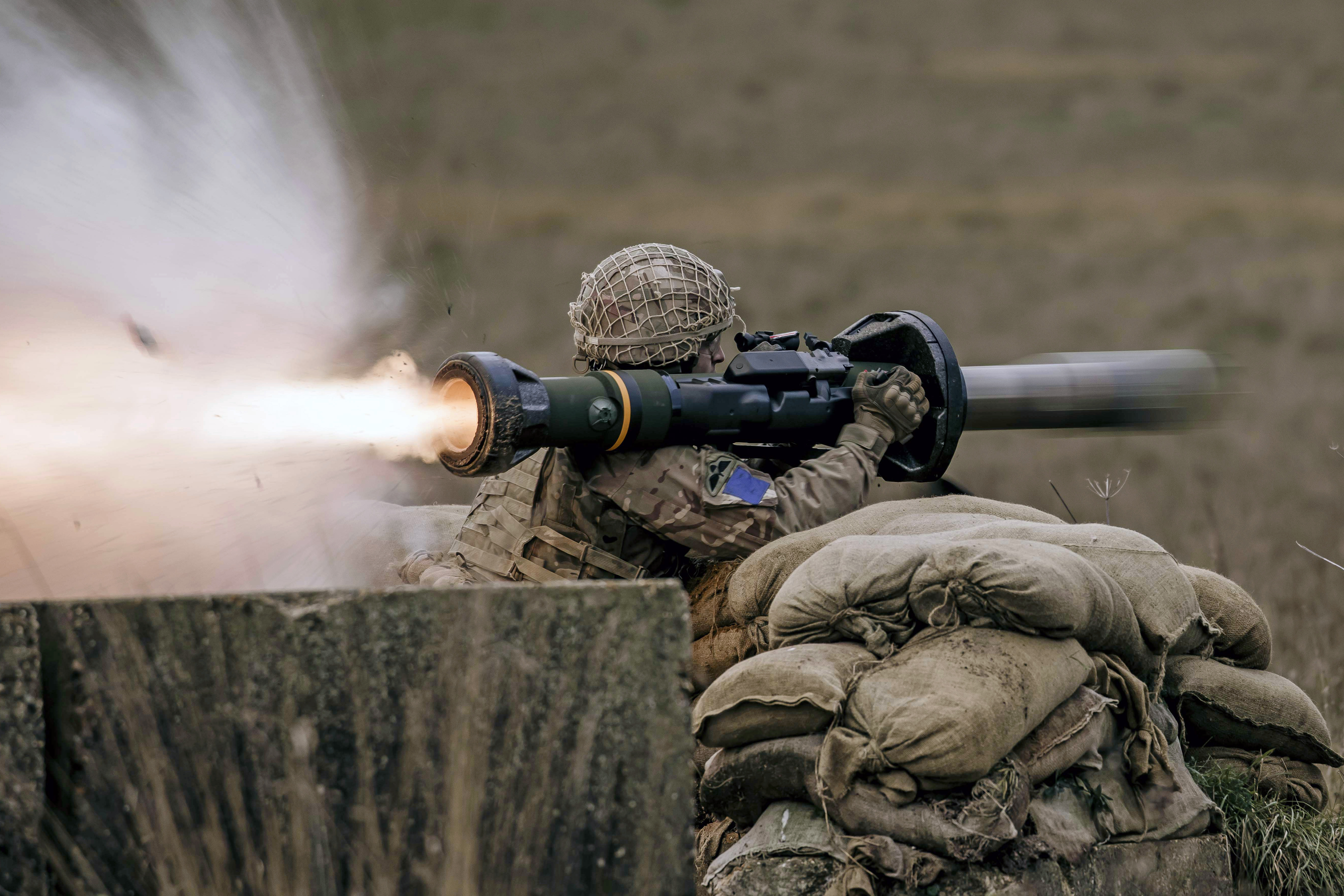
A soldier from 2 PARA fires a NLAW.

The Second Battalion, Parachute Regiment (2 PARA) comprises several rifle companies, which form the battalion’s main manoeuvre elements, supported by specialist sub-units providing key combat and operational capabilities. These include a Mortar Platoon for indirect fire, an Anti-Tank Platoon equipped with NLAW and Javelin missiles, a Machine Gun Platoon for direct fire support, and a Patrols Platoon responsible for reconnaissance and surveillance. The battalion also maintains a Sniper Platoon for precision engagement, a Phantom Platoon delivering cyber and electromagnetic activities (CEMA), an Intelligence Section, and a Signals Platoon, while Headquarters Company provides command, administrative, and enabling support to the battalion headquarters.

== See also ==
- 1st Battalion, Parachute Regiment
- 3rd Battalion, Parachute Regiment
- 4th Battalion, Parachute Regiment
- Red Devils (Parachute Regiment)
- List of battalions of the Parachute Regiment
- Parachute Regiment and Airborne Forces Museum
- List of Second World War British airborne battalions
