= Barrow upon Soar rail crash =

2008 rail crash in Leicestershire, England

Coordinates: 52.75159°N 1.15174°W

Barrow Upon Soar rail crash
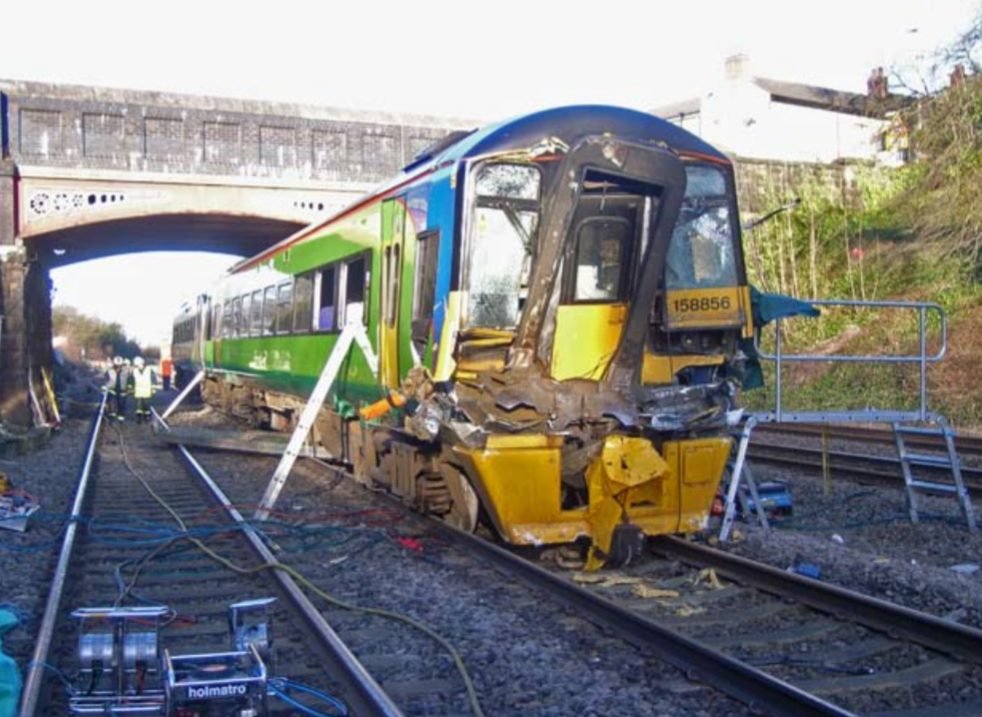
- Damage to the train following the accident

Details
- Date: 1 February 2008; 06:32 UTC
- Location: Barrow upon Soar, Leicestershire
- Country: England
- Line: Midland Main Line
- Operator: East Midlands Trains
- Owner: Angel Trains
- Cause: Collapsed Bridge

Statistics
- Trains: 1
- Vehicles: 1
- Passengers: 6
- Crew: 2
- Deaths: 0
- Injured: 7 (1 serious)

The Barrow upon Soar rail crash occurred on 1 February 2008, some 450 metres (490 yd) north of Barrow-upon-Soar railway station, in Barrow upon Soar, Leicestershire. A train collided with debris from a collapsed footbridge which had been hit by a lorry causing the train to derail and injure six passengers and the driver.

== Background ==
In October 2007, the track asset manager (TAM) identified the need to remove wet beds and clean drains on the down slow line between 109 miles 230 and 300 yards. (Note: Measured from St Pancras International Station) These works were scheduled for 2 February 2008, with ballast being delivered between 06:00 and 08:00 UTC by road on 30 and 31 January and 1 February 2008. The first two deliveries on January 30 and 31 were completed successfully without incident. Prior to this accident, unit 158856 had already been involved in an accident; a fatal collision with two teenage girls at Elsenham railway station in 2005.

== Accident ==
=== Events immediately preceding the accident ===
At approximately 06:30 UTC on 1 February 2008, a tipper lorry delivering quarry stone (ballast for track formation) had delivered its load adjacent to the tracks along a railway access road but had not lowered its rear tipping body. This came into contact with the wrought iron pedestrian bridge which crosses the railway, knocking it off its pillars and onto the tracks, by the High Street in Barrow upon Soar village centre. This blocked all four lines. The Network Rail employee who had been supervising the delivery first went back to check on the lorry driver, then made an emergency call to the signaller at Leicester power signal box and asked for all train movements to be stopped in the area.

=== Collision ===
The service involved was the 06:13 Nottingham to Norwich (service 1L03) and was running a British Rail Class 158 Sprinter (unit 158856). The train was owned by Angel Trains and operated by East Midlands Trains. During the call, he saw the train approaching and shook his head-torch vigorously to alert the driver and the driver sounded his horn in response, treating it as an emergency signal and applying the emergency brake. 1L03 had received the emergency call as did all of the other trains. However, it was too late; travelling at 65 miles per hour (105 km/h), the train could not stop in time and collided with rubble from the footbridge at 06:32 UTC. The train derailed and took 170 metres (190 yd) to stop, coming to rest partially under a road bridge.

=== Immediate aftermath ===
After the train came to a stop, the guard walked to the front of the train whilst checking passengers. In the cab he found the driver. He called the signaller with the signal phone at signal LR494 on the up fast line, having lost his mobile phone in the accident. He was advised to wait with the driver as all lines were blocked and no extra protection was required. The Controller of Site Safety (COSS) requested the signaller call emergency services and then proceeded to call the emergency services themselves. Following instructions of the emergency service operator, the COSS went to the train to check on the passengers and crew before returning to check on the lorry driver. All other trains avoided the incident, stopping upon receiving the call.

== Aftermath ==
=== Disruptions ===
Following the accident, services were halted for the day on the line. A spokesperson from East Midlands Trains said services would return the next day but disruptions were expected to continue for a longer period.

=== Damages ===
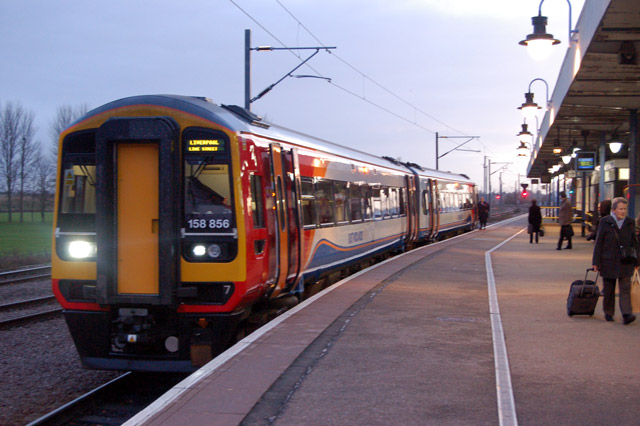
Unit 158856 pictured at Ely railway station in November 2009.

Unit 158856 was repaired and returned to passenger service by November 2009. It went on to have a third accident in February 2024, hitting fallen trees between Thetford and Harling Road and injuring one passenger. It has since returned to service.

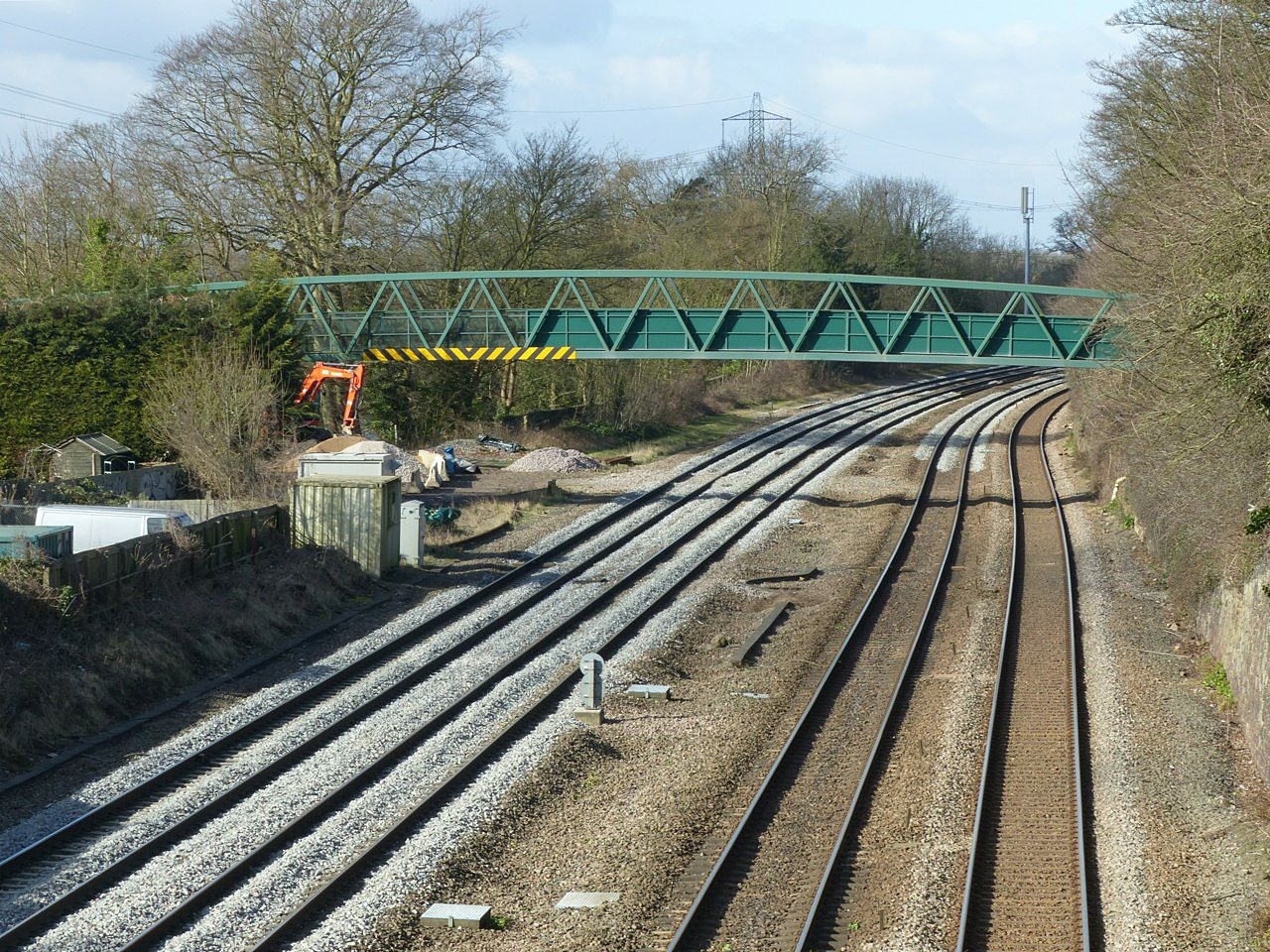
The new footbridge.

The footbridge, having been destroyed in the crash, was replaced in September the same year. The rail fastenings, sleepers, an AWS magnet for the aforementioned signal LR494 and a hot axle box detector (HABD) were damaged. A lineside HABD box was also destroyed.

== Casualties ==
Six passengers suffered minor injuries. The train driver, having been trapped for two and a half hours and needing to be cut out when the front of the cab caved in, suffered severe leg injuries. The COSS onboard the lorry was taken to hospital for shock and released later that day. The guard of the train and one passenger were taken to hospital for minor injuries, they were also released later that day. The driver was released early the next morning.

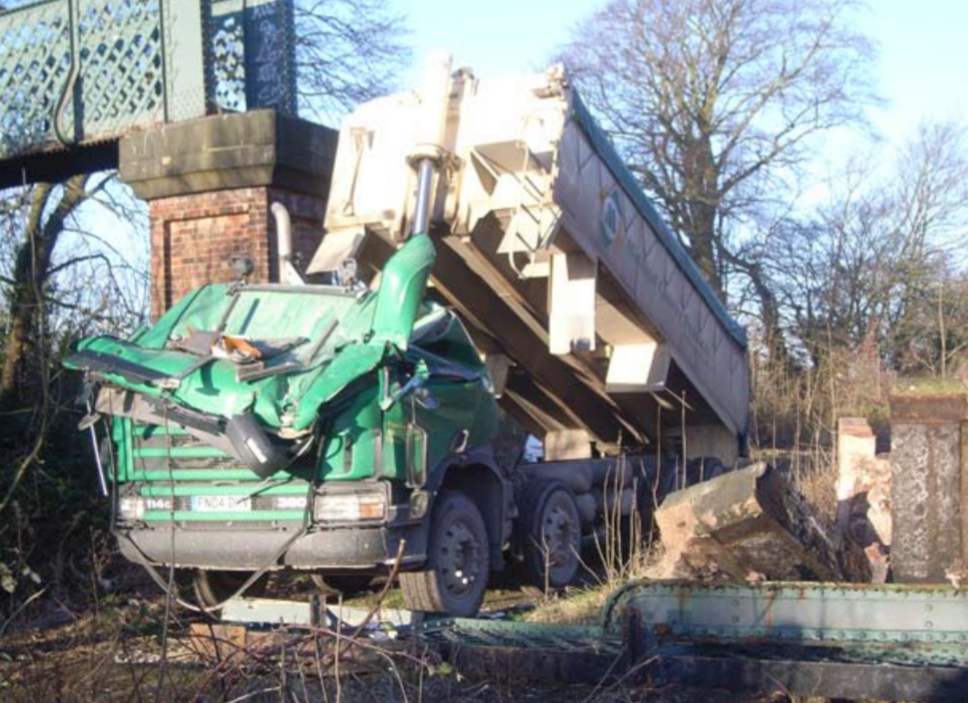
Damage to the cab of the lorry after the crash

Despite major damage to the cab, the lorry driver escaped without injury.

== Investigation ==
Following the collision, the RAIB launched an investigation into the accident. Their findings were published on 25 September 2008. They determined that the weather, which was mild, dry and dark at the time, played no role in the accident. They found the immediate cause to be the train's inability to stop before hitting the debris of the fallen footbridge. Other causes included the driver of the lorry forgetting to fully lower the body, potentially due to his distraction from normal duties when he opened the passenger door to allow the COSS inside; and the design of the visual alarm in the cab of the lorry which was such that it could be easily overlooked. The RAIB recommended the review of alarm systems on tipper lorries, the assessment of the risks on how road vehicles are controlled near live tracks on Network Rail property and ensure staff understand the difference between T2 track protection (used for protecting engineering work on a line not under possession) and T12 track protection (used for works which do not affect the line safety) and that the Rail Safety and Standards Board (RSSB) consider the practicality of design elements to limit bogie deviation during a derailment.

== Prosecution ==
On the 3 October 2011, the Office of Rail and Road (ORR), announced Network Rail was to be prosecuted on Health and Safety at Work etc. Act 1974 section 2(1) and 3(1) and regulation 5(1) of the Management of Health and Safety at Work Regulations 1999. They were fined £80000 and were ordered to pay £32000.
