= Operation Pitting =

2021 evacuation of Britons and eligible Afghans from Afghanistan

- Part of the 2021 Kabul airlift, the 2021 Taliban offensive and the War in Afghanistan
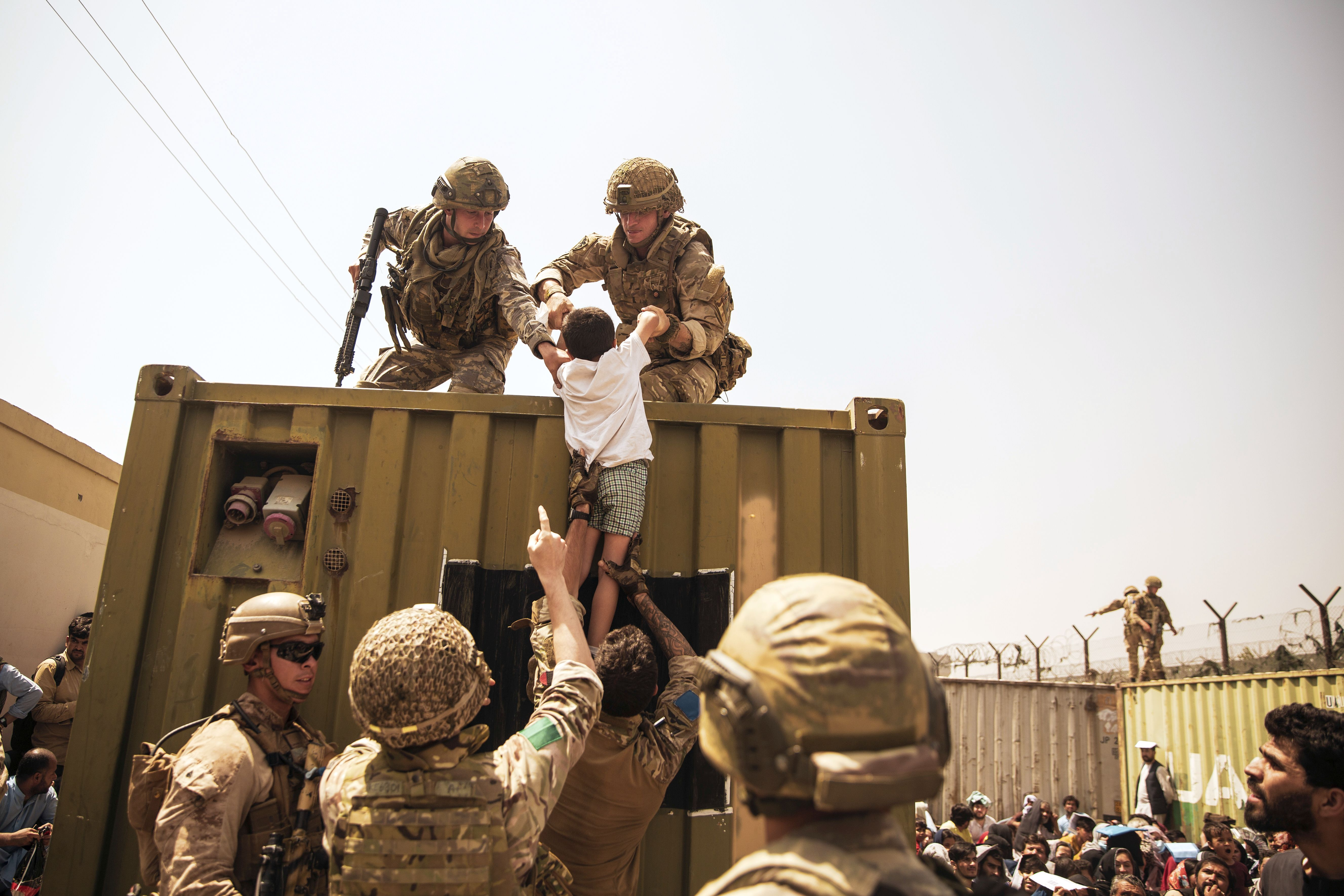
- British, American, and Turkish soldiers assist an Afghan child outside the Hamid Karzai International Airport in Kabul
- Type: Non-combatant evacuation operation (NEO)
- Location: Kabul, Afghanistan
- Objective: Evacuation of British nationals, embassy staff and eligible Afghans
- Date: 13 August 2021 – 28 August 2021
- Executed by: United Kingdom
- Outcome: Over 15,000 eligible Afghans and British nationals successfully evacuated

Operation Pitting was a British military operation to evacuate British nationals and eligible Afghans from Afghanistan following the 2021 Taliban offensive. The operation consisted of more than 1,000 military personnel, including soldiers from 16 Air Assault Brigade. It ran concurrently with the evacuation efforts of numerous other countries.

Over 15,000 people were airlifted to safety on more than 100 flights in the largest British evacuation since the Second World War and the largest airlift since the Berlin Blockade of 1948–9. Of those evacuated, 5,000 were British nationals and 8,000 were Afghans who were vulnerable to persecution by the Taliban due to their role in assisting British forces during Operation Herrick (2002–2014). Around 2,200 evacuees were children, with the youngest just one day old.

The evacuation implemented commitments made by the British government under the Afghan Relocations and Assistance Policy (ARAP), which began in April 2021. In total, 10,000 eligible Afghans were evacuated under ARAP through to the end of Operation Pitting. The operation marked the end of the UK's 20-year involvement in the war in Afghanistan.

== Background ==
=== War in Afghanistan ===
In 2001, the United Kingdom joined the United States and its allies in invading Afghanistan to depose the Taliban which was providing a safe haven to Al-Qaeda and its leader, Osama bin Laden, both responsible for the September 11 attacks in the United States. The British contribution to this invasion was code-named Operation Veritas, which was replaced by Operation Herrick in 2002. During the operation, the UK worked as part of the International Security Assistance Force (ISAF), alongside the US and allies, to train and reinforce the Afghan National Security Forces (ANSF) and counter a Taliban insurgency. At its peak, the UK had 9,500 military personnel deployed to Afghanistan. These numbers were gradually reduced, in coordination with allies, beginning in 2013. By 2014, all combat operations had ceased, whilst training continued under a new operation, code-named Operation Toral, part of the wider NATO Resolute Support Mission.

=== Doha Agreement and Taliban offensive ===
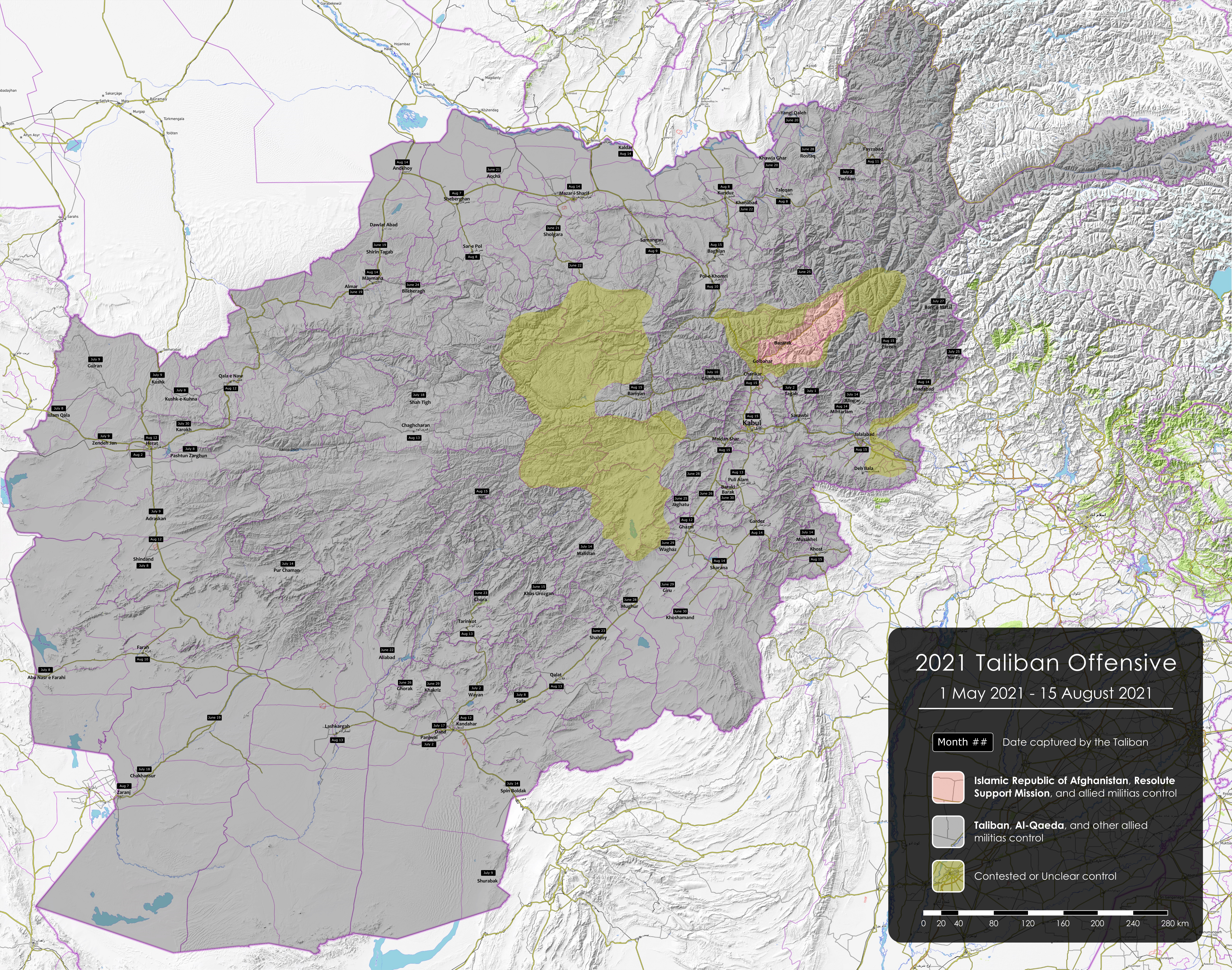
A map of Afghanistan showing the Taliban offensive as of August 15, 2021

In February 2020, the United States and the Taliban signed the Doha Agreement which permitted the release of 5,000 Taliban prisoners, including 400 who were accused and convicted of major crimes, such as murder, in exchange for US and NATO withdrawal from Afghanistan, the prevention of Al-Qaeda operating in areas under Taliban control and dialogue between the Taliban and Afghan government. However, within 45 days of the agreement, between 1 March and 15 April 2020, there had been a significant upsurge in Taliban attacks against Afghan security forces. On 22 June 2020, 291 ANSF were killed in the previous week and 550 wounded in 422 attacks carried out by the Taliban. At least 42 civilians, including women and children, were also killed with 105 wounded, in 18 provinces. Despite this, the Trump administration in the United States agreed to an initial reduction of its force level from 13,000 to 8,600 by July 2020, followed by a full withdrawal by 1 May 2021. The newly-incumbent Biden administration subsequently extended the withdrawal deadline to 11 September 2021. This was further shifted to 31 August. The Taliban stepped up its offensives in response to the US and NATO withdrawals, making significant advancements in the countryside and increasing the number of its controlled districts from 73 to 223 in the first three months. From 6 August 2021, the Taliban had captured twenty of Afghanistan's 34 provincial capitals, including Kandahar and Herat, and by 10 August, it controlled 65% of the country's area. British Secretary of State for Defence Ben Wallace was highly critical of the deal between the US and the Taliban, describing it as "rotten" and a "mistake". In an interview with the press, Wallace also stated he was so "aghast" at the US decision to withdraw that he canvassed other NATO allies to see if there was support for a new alliance without the United States.

=== Afghan Relocations and Assistance Policy ===
In the UK, calls were made by veterans, politicians and campaigners for the government to grant asylum to Afghans who assisted British forces during the war, such as interpreters, due to fears of Taliban reprisals. In December 2020, the UK government launched the Afghan Relocations and Assistance Policy (ARAP) scheme to offer relocation of eligible Afghans to the UK. An Afghan Threat and Risk Evaluation Unit (ATREU) was established at the British Embassy in Kabul to assess candidates. The scheme began to offer relocation or other assistance in April 2021.

On 6 August, the Foreign, Commonwealth and Development Office (FCDO) advised all British nationals to leave Afghanistan immediately due to the worsening security situation; however, it warned people not to rely on the FCDO for support due to the limited capacity of the British Embassy in Kabul. The FCDO believed more than 4,000 British nationals were in Afghanistan at the time.

In July 2025 it was revealed that the details of up to 100000 Afghans potentially covered by AARP had been accidentally disclosed and the Afghan Response Route was launched.

== Operational history ==
=== Authorisation ===
The operation was first announced on 13 August 2021 after it was authorised by Prime Minister Boris Johnson. Its stated aim, according to the Ministry of Defence, was to evacuate British nationals, embassy staff and Afghans eligible for relocation under the Afghan Relocation and Assistance Policy (ARAP). The operation began with approximately 600 military personnel, some of which were drawn from the British Army's high-readiness 16 Air Assault Brigade, tasked with logistical support and force protection. They were joined by a small team from the Home Office to assist the FCDO in Kabul with processing visas and other travel documents. Command and control for the operation was conducted by forward deployed and UK based elements of the Joint Force Headquarters based at Permanent Joint Headquarters in Northwood, London and it was led by Commander of Joint Operations Sir Ben Key. The United States carried out a concurrent military operation with the same aim, code-named Operation Allies Refuge, and there were similar operations being carried out by other countries. The UK established an airbridge between the UK and Afghanistan with stop-overs taking place in the United Arab Emirates. The operation had been planned months before; however, the Taliban offensive progressed far quicker than expected.

=== Arrival of British forces ===
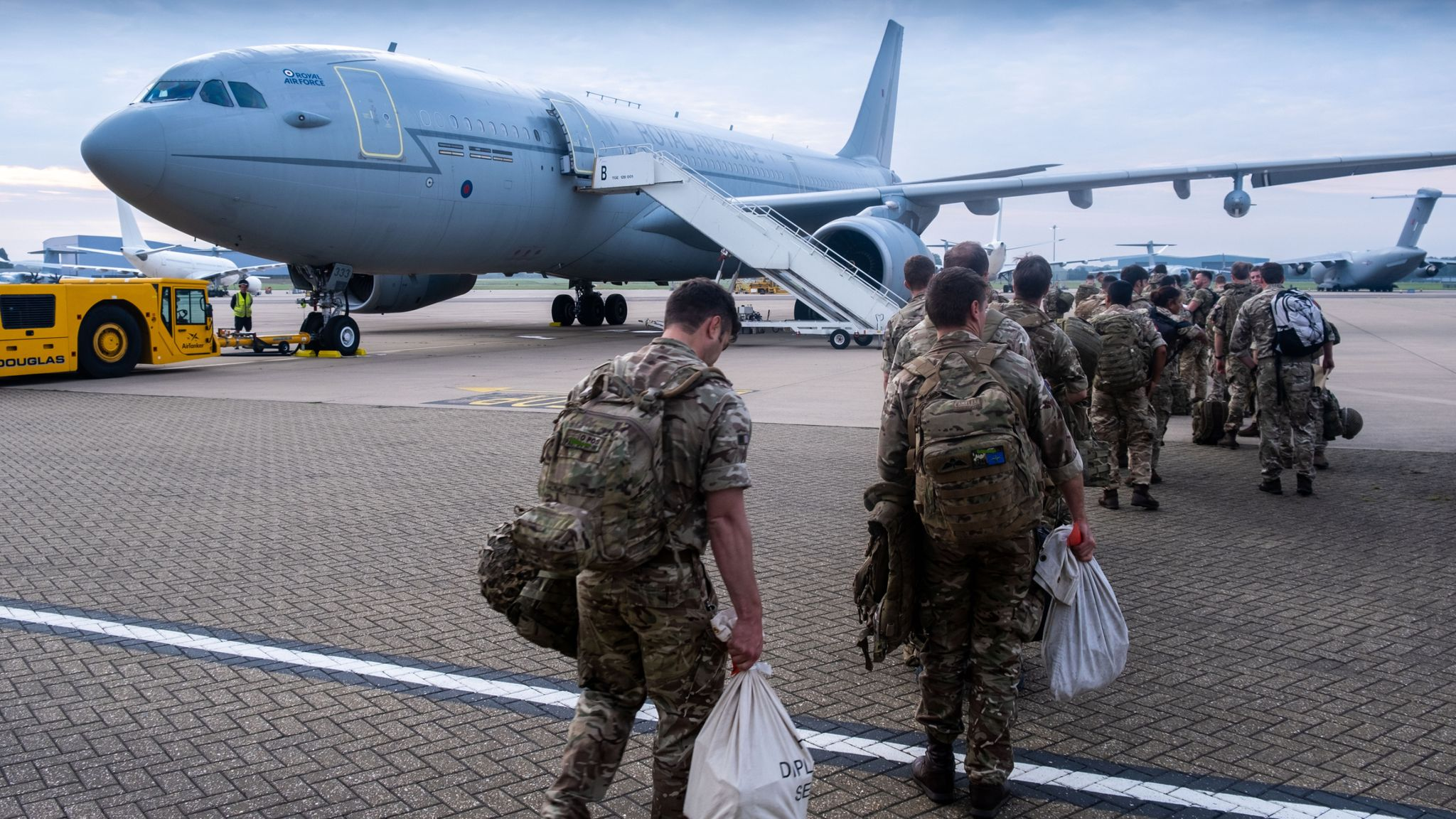
UK military personnel deploying from RAF Brize Norton (13 August 2021)

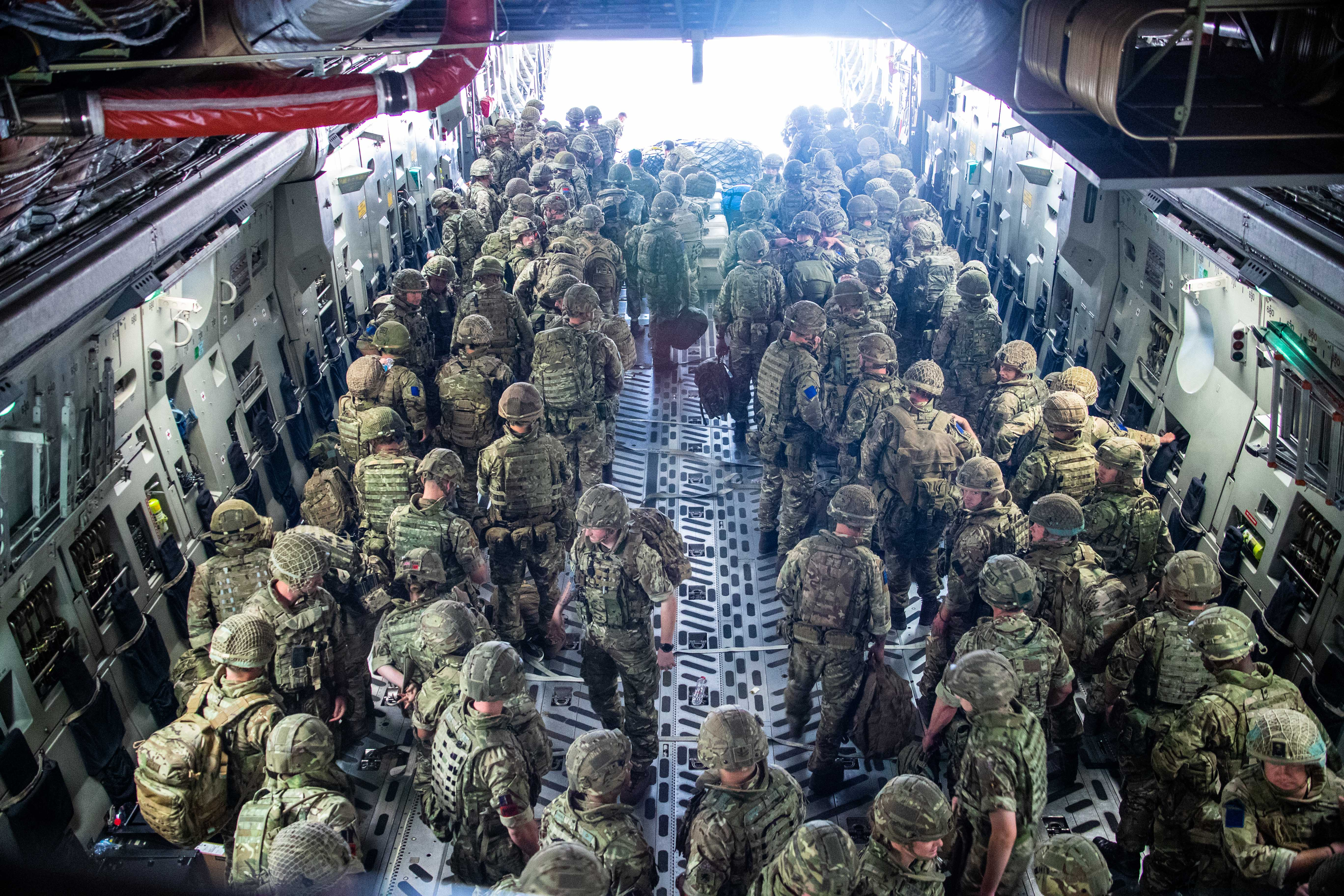
Personnel from 16 Air Assault Brigade arriving in Kabul (15 August 2021)

British military personnel began arriving at Kabul's Hamid Karzai International Airport on 15 August aboard a Royal Air Force Boeing C-17 Globemaster III. HQ staff worked to establish a command and control centre beyond the airport wire to coordinate evacuation efforts, whilst other troops helped vacate diplomatic staff at the British Embassy and also establish a processing centre at Baron Hotel. Elsewhere, troops began cooperating with US forces to secure the airport. During the same day, Kabul, the capital and largest city of Afghanistan, fell to the Taliban shortly after Afghan President Ashraf Ghani fled the country, leading to the collapse of the Afghan government. The Taliban subsequently requested a peaceful transfer of power. During the Fall of Kabul, the airport was targeted by gunfire and mortar rounds. Some of these rounds landed around an RAF A400M Atlas C1 aircraft which had landed with military personnel on board.

On 16 August, the first flight of 370 evacuees arrived at RAF Brize Norton in Oxfordshire, England via an RAF Airbus A330 Voyager aircraft. A total of eleven RAF aircraft, consisting of four Voyagers, four C-17s, two Atlas C1s and one Lockheed C-130J Hercules were involved in operations during the same day. Following the suspension of most commercial flights from Kabul, crowds of stranded Afghans took to the runways out of desperation and attempted to board aircraft. There were at least five confirmed deaths, with some falling to their deaths after latching onto the sides of aircraft that were taking off. This occurred in the commercial part of the airport, whilst British forces operated in the separate military side; Defence Secretary Ben Wallace was given assurances from the Taliban, via a third party, that the military side would be kept functional. During an interview with LBC, an emotional Wallace also admitted that some people would be left behind, particularly those not in Kabul, but insisted that the operation was open-ended and without a time limit. According to Wallace, the operation aimed to evacuate a further 1,500 people over the next 24–36 hours. A further 200 military personnel were deployed to Kabul, bringing the total to 900, with further troops able to rapidly deploy from elsewhere in the region, as well as from the UK, if necessary.

The RAF began diverting aircraft from other operations to assist. The UK Border Force also became involved with the operation to help process evacuees. 2nd Battalion, The Parachute Regiment deployed as part of the airlift protection force.

=== Mass airlifts ===
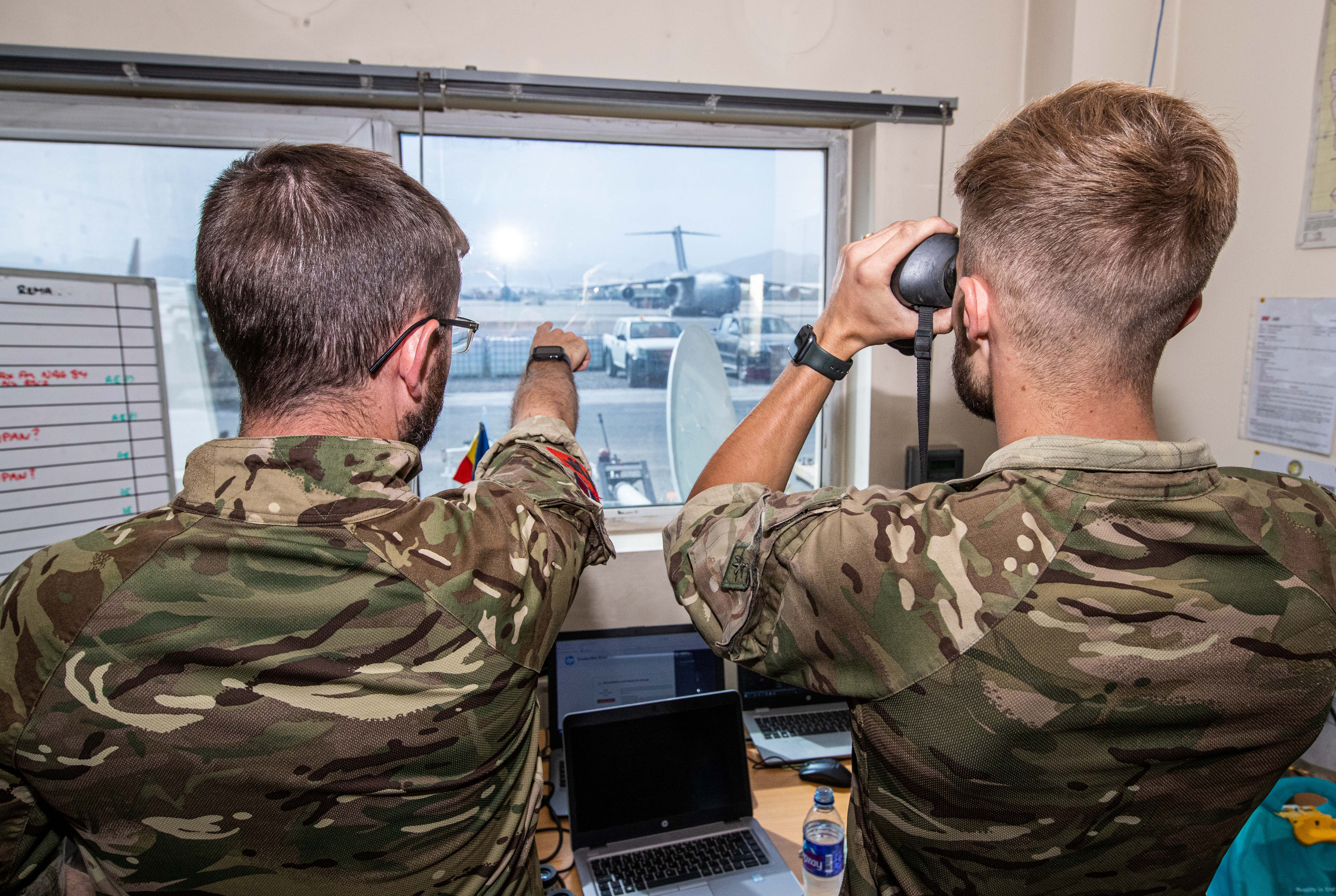
UK military personnel at Kabul International Airport (19 August 2021)

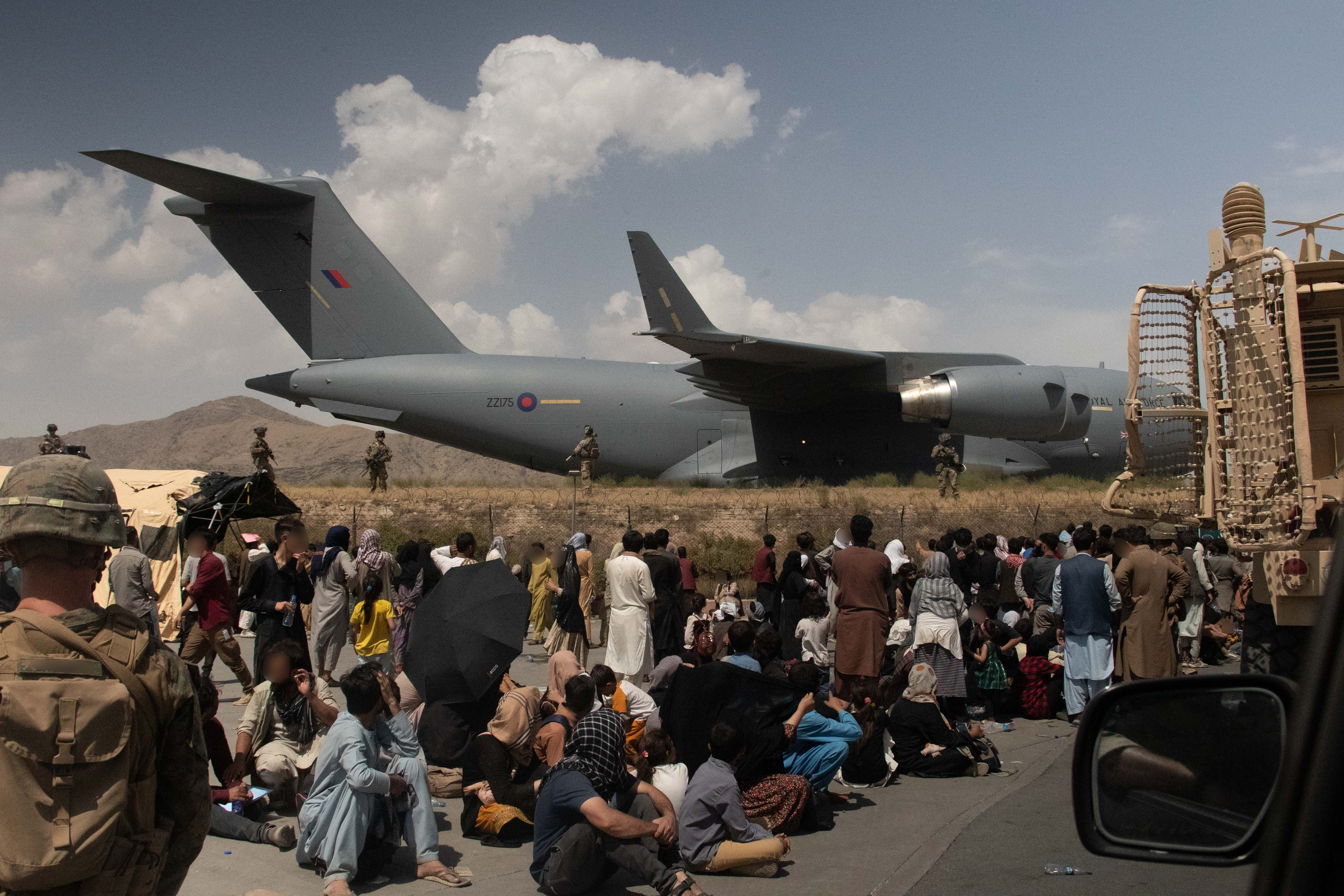
An RAF C-17 at Kabul International Airport to assist with evacuations (20 August 2021)

By 17 August, US forces, with the support of British and allied forces, had successfully taken control of the airport. The airport subsequently became more stable, allowing the RAF to begin mass airlifts. The access points to the airport, as well as the city at large, remained under Taliban control, however the Taliban were cooperative with local commanders. Chief of Joint Operations Vice Admiral Sir Ben Key warned that if the Taliban became uncooperative, British forces may have to abandon rescue operations.

On 18 August, reports began to emerge that Taliban checkpoints outside the airport were refusing entry to some Afghans and beating women and children. This was followed by a report published by the RHIPTO Norwegian Center for Global Analyses that the Taliban were conducting door-to-door searches for Afghans who had previously assisted coalition forces. During the same day, two RAF evacuation flights took place, carrying a potential maximum of 250 passengers each, which also included 76 Australians.

On 19 August, Defence Secretary Ben Wallace announced that no unattended children would be permitted to fly after footage was released of desperate Afghan families handing over their children to British and US forces.

On 20 August, a report from The Times claimed UK Special Forces were active in Kabul and seeking out those unable to access the airport due to the Taliban. In the previous 24 hours, the RAF had evacuated 963 people.

On 21 August, soaring temperatures and cramped conditions lead to increased disorder from growing queues of Afghans. This resulted in casualties, which were tended to by British medics, as well as a number of deaths. To try and maintain order, shots were fired into the air. During the same day, an on-scene report by Sky News Chief Correspondent Stuart Ramsay provided an insight into the procedures undertaken by British forces. According to his report, a compound was being used to process evacuees which had a row of shipping containers at its entrance. Soldiers were stood atop them and called eligible people forward. Beyond the containers, a chaotic crowd of "possibly tens of thousands" awaited processing, held back by a line of paratroopers with riot shields. Taliban militants were also present in the crowd, beating people with canes. They also checked documents and ushered people to the front of the queue if they had basic travel documentation, such as a passport. They were then let through the line of paratroopers and shipping containers for further processing. According to another report by the same author, the Taliban cooperated closely with the paratroopers, sometimes standing atop their shipping containers. Once through the compound, a bus shuttled the evacuees to a passenger handling facility where the RAF Police performed safety checks and RAF movers processed check-ins. The Royal Logistics Corps was responsible for all logistics.

=== Growing security threat and US withdrawal ===
On 22 August, the US made changes to its evacuation procedures due to the threat posed by ISIL-KP, a branch of the Islamist terrorist organisation Islamic State of Iraq and the Levant which is known to be active in Afghanistan. The UK also acknowledged this threat. Whilst both radical Jihadist groups, ISIL-KP follows Wahhabi-Salafist traditions which are a lot more extreme than the Deobandi traditions practised by the Taliban. This has brought both groups into conflict with one another. Elements of 2nd battalion The Royal Yorkshire regiment deployed from Cyprus

On 23 August, Defence Secretary Ben Wallace announced that the UK had "hours not weeks" to complete its evacuations after the US announced its intention to withdraw on 31 August. The UK government said it would request an extension of the US deadline to allow more flights to take place, however, the Taliban said it would not support a deadline extension. On the same day, it was announced that a total of 6,631 people had been evacuated by the UK since operations began. This included one person who was shortly afterwards thought to be on a "no-fly" watchlist, used to protect against those deemed to be a security threat, such as terrorists, but later confirmed not to be. Around 200 members of the Black Watch, 3rd Battalion, Royal Regiment of Scotland prepared to deploy. In total, over 1,000 military personnel were now involved with operations.

On 24 August, the UK hosted an emergency meeting for G7 leaders which Prime Minister Boris Johnson used to request an extension of the US deadline, backed by the leaders of France, Germany, Italy, Canada and Japan. In response, the Taliban reiterated its position, describing a deadline extension as a "violation" which it would respond to. Following the G7 leaders meeting, the US announced that the deadline would remain in place. In the UK, questions were raised on the prospects of the UK military taking over Kabul airport after the departure of the US, however, according to retired British Army General Sir Richard Barrons, the UK would find it difficult to replace the vast resources the US has deployed and the Taliban, opposed to foreign forces remaining beyond the US withdrawal, had the potential to pose too great a threat. Former Defence Minister Johnny Mercer denied claims the UK was unable to carry out its operations without the US and argued it was an issue of political will.

On 26 August, Prime Minister Boris Johnson stated the "overwhelming majority" of eligible people had been evacuated by the UK, amounting to a total of around 15,000 people, however around 2,000 remained. Defence Minister James Heappey admitted that some people would not be evacuated by the 31 August deadline. Heappey also warned of the risk posed by Islamic State and claimed there was "now very, very credible reporting of an imminent attack". During the same day, a suicide bombing occurred on the outskirts of the airport which resulted in the deaths of at least 182 people, including 13 US military personnel, and injuries to over 150. Two British nationals and the child of a British national were also killed. There were initial reports of a second bombing occurring at Baron Hotel, which was being used as a processing centre for British forces, however subsequent investigations found a second attack had not taken place. Following the attack, British forces provided medical assistance to the wounded and secured the perimeter, allowing US forces to extract their dead or wounded. British forces also assisted with bomb disposal.

Wallace announced that British forces would withdraw ahead of the US but insisted that the attacks, blamed on ISIL-KP, had not hastened this departure.Hours after the attack, an RAF C-17 loaded with evacuees also had a near miss with three vehicles, including a bus, which had mistakenly steered onto the runway. Both pilots believed aborting take-off would result in a collision, however the aircraft was able to reach the required speed to get airborne, narrowly missing the vehicles by 10–15 ft (3.0–4.6 m). Further complicating the situation, the aircraft had to take-off without the aid of runway lights as the airport had suffered a power failure.

On 31 August, emails revealed to BBC Newsnight showed that the British Embassy had instructed evacuees to reach Abbey Gate hours before the attack, despite the UK and US previously announcing an attack was imminent. On 30 August, Politico also claimed that US commanders wanted to close Abbey Gate due to the risk of an attack but kept it open at the UK's request to allow British evacuations to take place. These claims, however, were denied by the UK government.

=== Final stage ===
On 27 August, the UK government announced the Kabul evacuation had entered its final stage, following the Fall of Kabul. As part of the drawdown, the processing centre at Baron Hotel was closed and the focus shifted to evacuating those already processed. Defence Secretary Ben Wallace described his "deep regret" that not everyone would be able to evacuate but praised the efforts of those involved in evacuating over 13,000 people in 14 days. Wallace also disclosed that timetables had been "squeezed" and military equipment was under consideration to be left behind or destroyed to free up capacity for more Afghans and British nationals.

On 28 August, Chief of the Defence Staff Sir Nick Carter confirmed that evacuation operations were ending that same day, stating that it was "heartbreaking" that they had failed to evacuate everyone who wanted to get out. During one of the final evacuation flights, flying via Dubai to Birmingham, an Afghan refugee gave birth to a baby girl. The final evacuation flight for civilians left later on that same day, followed by the very final evacuation flight, carrying military personnel, marking the end of the operation. Between 800–1,100 eligible Afghans and 100–150 British nationals were estimated to have been left behind, along with some military equipment. The UK government subsequently entered into talks with the Taliban on the safe passage out of Afghanistan of those left behind.

By the end of the operation, the RAF had carried out over 100 evacuation flights, amounting to a total of 261,000 miles (420,000 km). Thirty-one flights from Kabul were undertaken by the A400M, forty-six by the C-17 and twenty-four by the C-130J. One flight undertaken by a C-17 carried a total of 436 people, triple the aircraft's designed capacity and the highest capacity flight in RAF history. A total of over 15,000 people were evacuated, consisting of 5,000 British nationals and 8,000 Afghans—2,200 of which were also children.

== Deployed forces ==
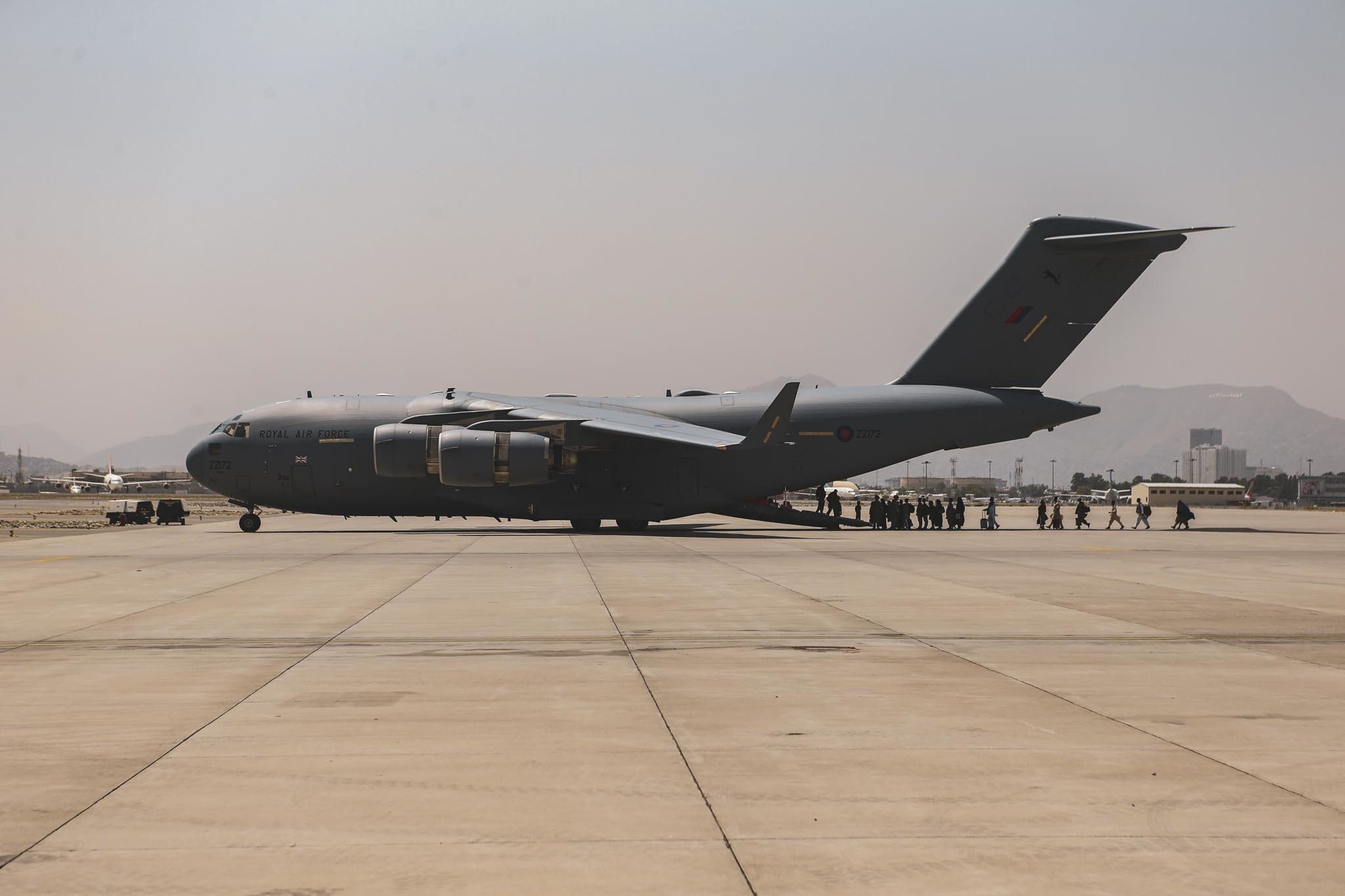
One of five RAF Boeing C-17 Globemaster III aircraft at Kabul International Airport (20 August 2021)

=== Locations ===
- Permanent Joint Headquarters at Northwood Headquarters, London
- Hamid Karzai International Airport in Kabul, Afghanistan is where the evacuation flights were staged
- Al Minhad Air Base and Al Maktoum International Airport in Dubai, United Arab Emirates and RAF Akrotiri in the Island of Cyprus constituted stop-overs as part of the airbridge; C-130, C-17 and A400M aircraft brought passengers from Afghanistan to be loaded onto Voyager aircraft bound for the UK
- RAF Brize Norton in Oxfordshire, England is where the evacuation flights landed in the UK

=== British Armed Forces ===
A peak of over 1,000 military personnel were involved with the operation.

==== British Army ====
The British Army was involved with a variety of tasks, including force protection, logistics, humanitarian assistance and the processing of evacuees.

- Elements of 16 Air Assault Brigade, including:
  - 2nd Battalion, The Parachute Regiment (2 PARA)
  - 3rd Battalion, The Parachute Regiment (3 PARA)
  - 16 Medical Regiment
  - 7th Parachute Regiment Royal Horse Artillery
  - 23 Parachute Engineer Regiment
  - 216 Parachute Signal Squadron
  - Pathfinder Platoon
  - 13 Air Assault Support Regiment RLC
- Elements of the Black Watch, 3rd Battalion, Royal Regiment of Scotland (3 SCOTS)
- Elements of the 2nd Battalion, The Yorkshire Regiment (2 YORKS)
- Elements of 33 Royal Engineers (Explosive Ordnance Disposal & Search)
- Elements of the 1st Battalion, The Royal Anglian Regiment
- Elements of the 1st Military Working Dog Regiment

==== Royal Air Force ====
Around 15 transport aircraft were used to support the operation, including:

- 5 x Boeing C-17 Globemaster III from No. 99 Squadron RAF
- 2 x Airbus A400M C1 from No. LXX Squadron RAF
- 2 x Lockheed Martin C-130J Hercules
- 3 x Airbus A330 Voyager

Additionally, RAF personnel performed passenger check-ins, flight safety checks, force protection and moved passengers and freight to and from aircraft. Units involved included:

- No. 906 Expeditionary Air Wing
  - No. 1 Air Mobility Wing (augmenting the Joint Movements Squadron)
  - UK Mobile Air Movements Squadron (UKMAMS)
- RAF Police
  - No 1 (Tactical) Police Squadron
  - No 7 RAF Police Squadron
- No. 8 Force Protection Wing
- No. II Squadron RAF Regiment
- No. 15 Squadron RAF Regiment
- Aeromedical Evacuation Squadron, TMW

==== Other ====
- UK Special Forces
- Joint force Headquarters

=== Non-military ===
- Foreign, Commonwealth and Development Office (FCDO)
- Home Office
- Border Force

== Legacy ==
Operation Pitting marked the end of the UK's 20-year military involvement in Afghanistan.

The total number of Afghans brought to the UK under the Afghan Relocations and Assistance Policy (ARAP) since it began in April reached around 10,000 people – double the number that was anticipated for 2021. Two Afghans were confirmed to have been killed after being refused access to RAF flights out of the country.

The British Embassy and Ambassador to Afghanistan Sir Laurie Bristow temporarily relocated to Qatar, but with the intention to reopen an embassy in Kabul as soon as possible.

The UK government said the ARAP scheme is not time-limited, and other Afghans deemed vulnerable, such as women and girls, can apply for the Afghan citizens' resettlement scheme, which will take up to 20,000 refugees in coming years. Those who were called forward for evacuation during Operation Pitting, but who did not make a flight out of Kabul, would be guaranteed a place under the scheme.

The UK government is considering incorporating Afghan special forces evacuated from Kabul into the British Army. The arrangement could be similar to the Brigade of Ghurkas that have served in the British Army for 200 years. Seven Afghan officer cadets are already enrolled at the Royal Military Academy Sandhurst.

On 31 August, it was reported that senior military figures and politicians had called for a medallic award for those who participated in the operation. This, however, received opposition from some Whitehall officials as the current medal criteria stipulates that medals can only be awarded for a minimum of 30 days continuous service; Operation Pitting in its entirety had a duration of just over two weeks. On January 19, 2022, it was announced that those who served on the operation and who met the eligibility criteria would be awarded the Afghanistan OSM with Operation Pitting clasp. It was also reported that some members of 2 PARA were receiving psychological therapy after their participation in the operation.

Sir Ben Key, Chief of Joint Operations in charge of Operation Pitting, was promoted to First Sea Lord, the professional head of the Royal Navy on 15 October 2021. Speaking on his promotion, Defence Secretary Ben Wallace praised his "key" role in the success of Operation Pitting.

In a Cabinet reshuffle in September 2021, Prime Minister Boris Johnson demoted Foreign Secretary Dominic Raab. Raab had received strong criticism for refusing to return home early from a holiday whilst Afghanistan fell to the Taliban.

On 19 January 2022, the Ministry of Defence announced that qualifying personnel from the Royal Navy, Royal Air Force and British Army would be awarded the Operational Service Medal for Afghanistan with a unique Operation Pitting clasp.

=== Continued military operations ===
On 31 August 2021, following the end of the evacuation operation, Air Chief Marshal Sir Michael Wigston stated that the UK was ready to launch strikes against ISIL-KP, the group responsible for the terrorist attack which killed two British nationals and a child of a third, as well as 13 US service personnel and dozens of Afghans during Operation Pitting. Foreign Secretary Dominic Raab acknowledged this statement and did not reject the prospect. In May 2021, Royal Navy First Sea Lord Tony Radakin stated that the UK Carrier Strike Group centred around HMS Queen Elizabeth was prepared to carry out strike operations against the Taliban if required.

Following Operation Pitting, NATO launched Operation Allied Sollace to relocate eligible Afghans via third countries. On 13 September 2021, around 140 troops from 1st Battalion, Royal Gurkha Rifles deployed to Kosovo as part of this operation to provide force protection and assistance with processing refugees prior to their onward transfer to the UK.

During October 2021, the RAF restarted periodic evacuation flights out of Afghanistan. The first airlifted up to 40 refugees to RAF Brize Norton in England via an undisclosed route. Further refugees were airlifted via third countries.

In December 2023 it emerged that some 200 British-trained Afghan special forces personnel and 32 former senior Afghan officials had had their applications for resettlement via the ARAP scheme refused, and potentially faced repatriation.

== See also ==
- 2021 Kabul airport attack
- Operation Devi Shakti
- Operation Allies Refuge
