= Midori-ku =

Midori-ku (緑区), is a common ward name in a number of Japanese cities.

- Midori-ku, Chiba, in Chiba Prefecture
- Midori-ku, Nagoya, in Aichi Prefecture
- Midori-ku, Sagamihara, in Kanagawa Prefecture
- Midori-ku, Saitama, in Saitama Prefecture
- Midori-ku, Yokohama, in Kanagawa Prefecture
