= Sussex Mountains =

Coordinates: 51.631°S 58.999°W

The Sussex Mountains are in the west of East Falkland. They are at the south east edge of San Carlos Water, and north shore of Grantham Sound.

Across the valley to the north are the Rodeo Mountains. They are effectively an extension of the Wickham Heights.

British forces had to cross these in order to get to Goose Green during the Falklands War.
