= Controller of site safety =

A Controller of Site Safety or COSS is a person qualified by the British civil engineering company Network Rail to ensure safe practice for work occurring on or near railway tracks and infrastructure. Their primary role is to set up a 'safe system of work' (SSOW) to protect staff working on or near tracks from trains.

== History ==
The PICOW is responsible for taking charge of the arrangements to ensure that you and anyone else in the group, is NOT put in a position of danger from approaching trains or movements.

— Rule Book No. 2 (1998)

The British Rail Rule Book assigned responsibility for appointment of lookouts for warning railway staff of approaching trains to the 'man-in-charge' through the 1980s. In February 1985, four railway workers that were part of a six-man crew clearing snow from points were struck and killed by a passing train. The group had no defined leader and no appointed lookouts despite poor visibility due to falling snow. In 1989, the role was renamed "Person In Charge of Work" (PICOW), but otherwise remained similar to the previous role.

In 1990, eleven railway staff were killed by trains while on or about the tracks, combined with further fatalities in 1991, British Rail revised the rules surrounding staff on or about the tracks, implementing significant changes in response to deficiencies in the rule book at the time.

From April 1992, a PICOW was required to be appointed anytime workers were on or near the line, in response to these incidents, tasked with ensuring workers are kept safe from trains by appointing lookouts, arranging closure of tracks and other methods. Additionally, the PICOW role now required a formal certification to perform, with a formal training course to teach key concepts, such as setting up safe system of work and usage of railway documents to plan work. The course was a 2-day course, implemented on the job experience requirements before someone could become eligible to train as a PICOW.

On 7 August 1999, this job role was officially renamed to Controller of Site Safety (COSS).

== Job role ==
The COSS has responsibility for the safety of themselves and the group under their direction and could be subject to prosecution should someone be killed or injured by their negligence.

The rules around performing the role of a COSS are stated in the Rule Book, a set of documents issued to track staff detailing their duties. Since 2010, this has been Rule Book Handbook 7, General duties of a controller of site safety (COSS).

To become a COSS, someone should have served a suitable period of time on the railways and undertake a five-day course. This is then followed by a period of mentoring by an experienced COSS and then independent regular assessments to ensure that the subject is competent to undertake their role safely and effectively.

A COSS is required to distinguish themselves on site by wearing a blue armlet/badge on the left arm or upper body on which the word "COSS" is printed in white text. They are prohibited from wearing this armlet/badge when not acting as a COSS.

=== Planning ===
Depending on the work, a COSS may be provided with a preplanned safe system of work. However, in situations where work was not planned, such as unexpected signal or track faults, the COSS will need to decide on and implement a safe system of work themselves. Further, a COSS may need to adapt a previously planned safe system of work if conditions change, such as weather, time of day or the location of the work.

Prior to approaching the railway line to start work, the COSS must be confident that the safe system of work will be adequate to protect the entire group from approaching trains. This includes factoring in variable conditions such as time of day, weather conditions, track and landscape geography and the nature of the work itself. They are also required to document that they've considered these factors and the decisions made regarding the safe system of work and if there were changes from previously planned arrangements.

The COSS also has the power to arrange for a railway track to be 'blocked' or closed to train traffic to enable work to be performed. The COSS has to coordinate this with the signaller, place detonators and possession limit board. (Note: A portable double-sided stop sign that has a red light, which denotes the limit of a track blockage for engineering work.)

=== Briefing ===
Prior to starting work near or on the tracks, the COSS must give the group they are in charge of a safety briefing that explains the following:

- Work being carried out
- Location work is being carried out
- The status of tracks: which are open to trains and which are closed to trains
- The safe system of work
- The location of the position of safety
- If using site wardens, who they are and limits of the safe working area
- If using lookouts, who they are and how they will give warning
- Any other hazards or information the group should know about, such as the presence overhead line equipment/conductor rail, limited clearances or poor walking conditions
- Means of communication in an emergency

Prior to accessing the tracks, the COSS must also verify that all members of the group have valid Sentinel competency card. (Note: A photo ID card that lists railway related qualifications, and proves an individual is trained and permitted to be on or near the tracks.) All members of the group are also required to sign the safe-work briefing form to confirm they understood the information in the briefing. The COSS is required to have direct supervision of the group, and must remain with them while on or near the tracks.

The preferred safe systems of working where the staff are protected from line open to train movements, either by blocking some or all lines to traffic or controlling the distance the group is from the track (called Safeguarded/Fenced/Separated areas in order of consideration). This method was formerly called a Green Zone. This is the safest way of working due to the higher risks with trains moving at speed, although many incidents still happen within blocks.

Open Line working (formerly known as Red Zone) means the lines are open to train movements; this is seen as more risky than Safeguarded/Fenced/Separated areas, and is avoided in the rail industry where practicable.

== Safe System of Work ==
A Safe System of Work (SSOW) is the method that railway employees use to protect themselves from being struck by moving trains while working on or near train tracks.

Hierarchy (Note: Discontinued after 2010)	Name	Type (Note: Discontinued after 2010)	Description	Other notes
1	Safeguarded	Green zone	All tracks are closed to trains, including parallel tracks where work isn't occurring	Engineering trains and equipment moving at approximately 5 miles per hour (8.0 km/h) are permitted
2	Fenced	Green zone	A rigid barrier, plastic construction fencing or barricade tape prevents workers from exiting the area where tracks are closed and entering an open track	
3	Separated	Green zone	A gap of 2 metres (6.6 ft) between the edge of the safe working area and an open line is maintained with a site warden (Note: A worker tasked with observing the boundary between the safe working area and the open tracks, and warning any worker who attempts to leave the safe working area to return to it.) appointed	
4	ATWS	Red zone	Warning to workers is given by lights and alarm tone of an Automatic Track Warning System (ATWS)	ATWS systems can be temporary or permanently installed and operates automatically when turned on.
5	TOWS	Red zone	Warning given by alarm tone of Train Operated Warning System (TOWS)	A British Rail designed, permanently installed, warning system that gives off an audible alarm tone with 25 seconds of warning, based on track circuits.
—N/a (Note: SATWS was introduced after the discontinuation of the Hierarchy.)	SATWS	—N/a (Note: SATWS was introduced after the discontinuation of Red/Green working terms.)	Warning given by sound and lights of a Semi-automatic track warning system (SATWS) that is automatically activated by a train, but must be manually cancelled by a staff member after the train passes	Unlike ATWS or TOWS, a human must deactivate the warning after the train has passed. Unlike LOWS, the system automatically detects a train.
6	LOWS	Red zone	Warning given by sound and/or lights of a portable Lookout Operated Warning System (LOWS) device at work site operated by a human positioned to watch for trains away from the work site	Unlike ATWS, a human must initiate the warning of a train approaching.
7	Lookout	Red zone	Warning is given by a human lookout at the work site, typically by sound of a horn or whistle	Also referred to as 'unassisted lookout' in newer documentation

Prior to 2010, these systems were referred to and grouped as 'green zone' and 'red zone'. Green zone referred to systems where the work site was protected from trains by closing the track (Note: Except to slow moving engineering trains and equipment) and red zone referred to systems where the tracks were still open to trains and workers would be required to move to a position of safety when trains approached. In an effort to reduce confusion and simplify the rule book, the terms were phased out in 2010. The hierarchy was also removed at this time, as it was largely rendered moot by instructions that required that the SSOW selected be most suitable to the task, circumstances and location of work.

Network Rail has aimed to eliminate the usage of human lookouts, with a significant push occurring after an incident at Margam, where two track workers were struck and killed by a train. At Margam, the six person crew had split into two groups, and the appointed lookout had remained with the other group. A 2021 fatality near Surbiton station prompted Network Rail to accelerate these efforts. In the June 2022 Network Rail Board meeting, it was acknowledged that lookout usage was already low as practical, with the majority of routes not using human lookouts. Total elimination was not realistic.

In 2025, the Rail Safety and Standards Board introduced updates to the Rule Book to further restrict the usage of lookouts. From December 2025, lookouts are only allowed when no other safe system of work is suitable, can not be used at night, during poor visibility or in/near tunnels. Further train speeds must be under 25 mph (40 km/h), and there are no junctions that would allow the train to unexpectedly change tracks. The usage of intermediate and distant lookouts (Note: In situations where visibility is limited, such as near curves, distant and intermediate lookouts could be positioned to signal the lookout at the worksite of an approaching train.) was also banned.
